= Reconquest (Chile) =

1814–1817 period of Chilean history

Captaincy General of Chile Capitanía General de Chile Reconquest Reconquista
- 1814–1817
- Flag

- Capital: Santiago de Chile
- Common languages: Spanish; Indigenous languages (Quechuan languages, Aymara, Mapudungun, Kawésqar, Yaghan)
- Government: Monarchy
- King
  - 1814-1817: Ferdinand VII
- Royal Governor
  - 1814-1815: Mariano Osorio
  - 1815-1817: Francisco Marcó del Pont
- History
  - Battle of Rancagua: October 2 1814
  - Battle of Chacabuco: February 12 1817
Preceded by	Succeeded by
Old Fatherland	New Fatherland

Spanish Reconquest or just Reconquest (Spanish: Reconquista) is the name of a period of Chilean history that started in 1814 with the royalist victory at the Battle of Rancagua and ended in 1817 with the patriot victory at the Battle of Chacabuco. During this period, the defenders of the Spanish Empire reestablished their dominion in Chile after said country had separated itself from the Spanish Crown, installed its First National Government Board in 1810—the first institution of self-government in Chile, created its First National Congress in 1811 and subsequently elected its first supreme director, Francisco de la Lastra, in 1814.

Authors such as the Chileans Julio Heise and Jaime Eyzaguirre prefer to call the period Absolutist Restoration, considering it merely the return to power of the royalists.

== After the battle of Rancagua ==
Upon learning the outcome of the Battle of Rancagua (qualified as a "Disaster" in Chilean historiography), many patriots decided to gather those belongings they could carry and began their exile in Mendoza. The soldiers who left Rancagua alive guarded the caravan of women and children as they ascended the Andes. However, the quarrels between Bernardo O'Higgins and José Miguel Carrera did not end with the battle of Rancagua; Upon arriving in Cuyo, they were received by the mayor-intendant at the time, José de San Martín, a friend of O'Higgins and member of the Lautaro Lodge, who decided to prosecute the Carrera brothers and their followers in Buenos Aires, for the death of Juan Mackenna. killed in a duel at the hands of Luis Carrera, one of O'Higgins' most prominent collaborators.

== Restoration of Spanish institutions ==
As of October 9, 1814, with the government of Mariano Osorio, colonial institutions were reestablished. Osorio received orders from the viceroy to be commiserated, but the person in charge of the kingdom's security, the captain of the Talavera de la Reina Regiment, Vicente San Bruno, did not tolerate it. The Vindication Courts were created, which all patriots and all those suspected of having collaborated with them had to attend. If they were found guilty, they had to pay a fine, and, if the charge was greater, they were arrested and then exiled to Juan Fernández. In November 1814, a ship sailed from Valparaíso carrying more than 200 exiles, who had to take shelter in caves and endure many hardships until they were rescued in 1817. Those patriots who went into exile in Mendoza had their property confiscated.

In February 1815, San Bruno pretended to open the prison so that the patriots could escape, but outside a platoon of riflemen was waiting for them and ended the patriots' lives. This act filled even the most realistic with indignation. Given this, Osorio reopened the Royal Court and later the Royal University of San Felipe repealed the decrees promulgated during the Patria Vieja (1810-1814) and eliminated the General José Miguel Carrera National Institute and the National Library, institutions created in that period. Due to conflicts with Viceroy José Fernando de Abascal (1806-1816), Osorio was removed from his position as governor (1815) and Casimiro Marcó del Pont was appointed.

Marcó del Pont made good friends with San Bruno, whom he placed in the position of president of the Surveillance and Public Security Court, establishing an espionage network that imposed terror in Santiago. The new governor went so far as to prohibit movement within the country without his authorization. He closed the chinganas, places where the people ate, drank and danced. Frightened by the secrets about a liberation expedition by O'Higgins and the guerrilla activities of Manuel Rodríguez, he put a price on the latter's head. One day, when Marcó del Pont was getting out of his carriage, a humble man approached him with feigned reverence to open the door for him. Marcó del Pont threw him a silver coin, without realizing that the one who opened the door of his carriage was Rodríguez.

The Spanish rulers were unable to extinguish the patriotic sentiment provoked by the formation of the Army of the Andes, led by Captain General San Martín with the help of Brigadiers O'Higgins, Miguel Estanislao Soler and Juan Gregorio de Las Heras.

== End of the Reconquest ==
On February 12, 1817, victory occurred in Chacabuco, under the command of General José de San Martín, supported by the Chilean Bernardo O'Higgins and the Argentine Soler, beginning the Patria Nueva (1817-1823).

== See also ==
- Chilean War of Independence § Reconquista
- Treaty of Lircay
- Vicente San Bruno
- Army of the Andes
- Crossing of the Andes
