= Flag of Chile =

Republic of Chile
- La Estrella Solitaria
- Use: National flag and ensign
- Proportion: 2:3
- Adopted: 18 October 1817; 209 years ago
- Design: A horizontal bicolor of white and red with the blue square ended on the upper hoist-side corner of the white band bearing the white five-pointed star in its center.
- Designed by: Ignacio Zenteno or Gregorio de Andía y Varela.

The flag of Chile consists of two equal-height horizontal bands of white and red, with a blue square the same height as the white band in the canton, which bears a white five-pointed star in its center. It was adopted on 18 October 1817. The Chilean flag is also known in Spanish as La Estrella Solitaria (The Lone Star).

It has a 3:2 ratio between length and width, it is divided horizontally into two bands of equal height (the lower being red). The upper area is divided once: into a square (blue), with a single centered white star; and into a rectangle (white), whose lengths are in proportion 1:2. It is in the stars and stripes flag family.

The star represents Venus, significant to the country's indigenous Mapuches, symbolizing a guide to progress and honor while other interpretations say it refers to an independent state; blue symbolizes the sky and the Pacific Ocean, white is for the snow-covered Andes, and red stands for the blood spilled to achieve independence.

According to the epic poem La Araucana, the colors were derived from those from the flag flown by the Mapuche during the Arauco War. "Flag Day" is held each year on the ninth of July to commemorate the 77 soldiers who died in the 1882 Battle of La Concepción.

== Design ==
=== Construction ===
The construction of the flag of Chile, at present, is officially defined in Supreme Decree No. 1,534 of the Ministry of the Interior, published in 1967, on the use of national emblems, which systematized and consolidated various laws and regulations on the subject. (Other laws include Law No. 2,597 of 11 January 1912, concerning the colors and proportions of the national flag, the presidential sash and rosette or cockade, and Supreme Decree No. 5805 of the Ministry of the Interior, published 26 August 1927, sets the size of the national flag for use in buildings and public offices.) According to the decree, the ratio between length and width of the flag is 3:2, being divided horizontally into two bands of equal size. While the lower section corresponds to the color red, the upper area is divided once in a blue square and a white rectangle whose lengths are in proportion 1:2, respectively. The star is located in the center of the blue canton and is constructed on a circle whose diameter is half the side of the canton.

==== Construction sheet ====
Flag construction sheet

=== Color scheme ===
The exact color shades are not defined by law, but they are listed as "turqui blue", "white" and "red". Approximations below:

Chile	Blue	Red	White
RGB	0-57-166	213-43-30	255-255-255
Hexadecimal	#0039a6	#d52b1e	#FFFFFF
CMYK	100, 66, 0, 35	0, 80, 86, 16	0, 0, 0, 0

== Display ==
Displaying the Chilean flag horizontally or vertically.

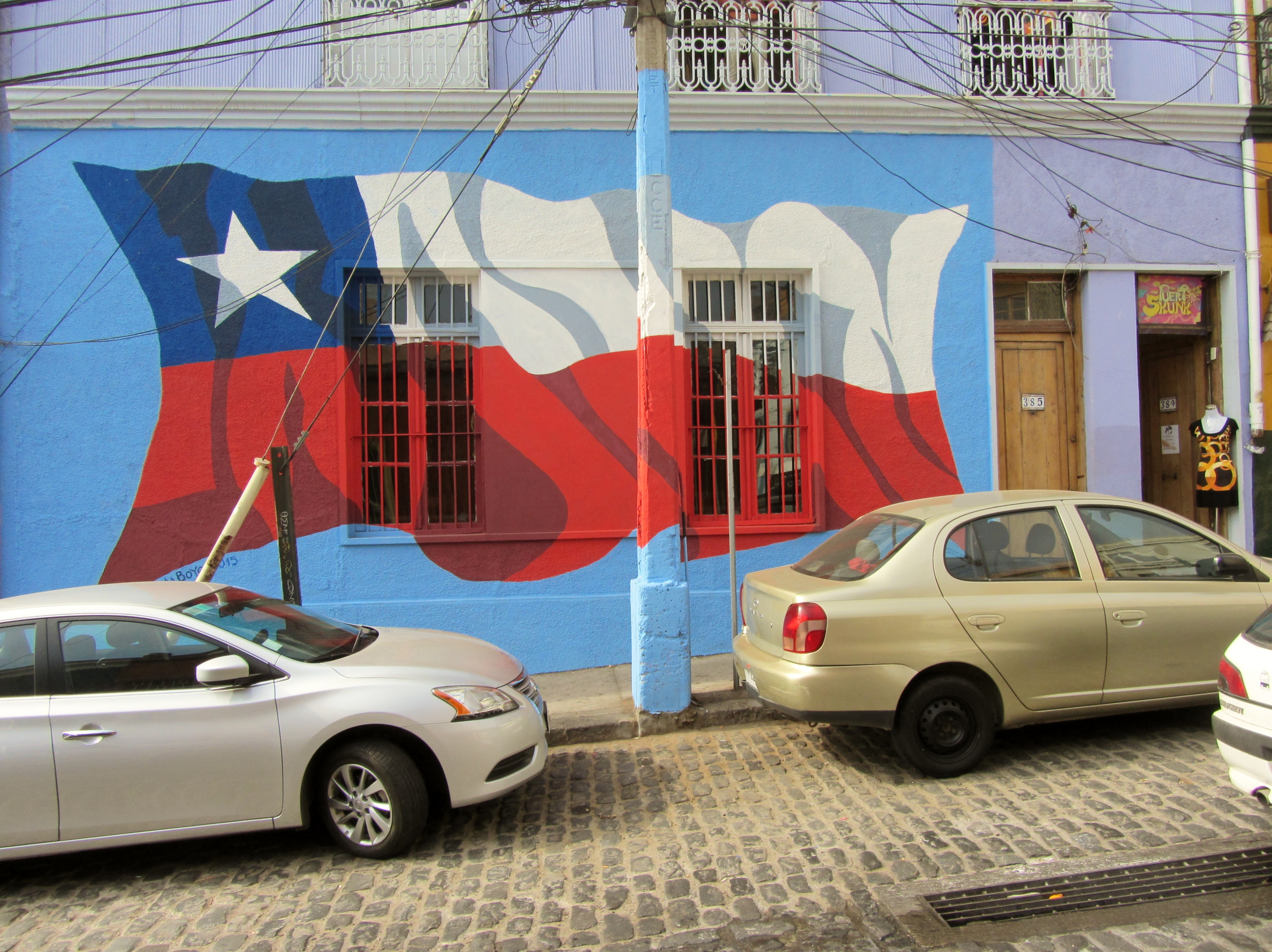
Chilean flag painted on a wall in Valparaíso.

According to Chilean law, public use of the flag is allowed without prior authorization. Before October 2011 its use was prohibited, without the approval of the provincial governor. (An exception was made in 2010 during the bicentennial celebrations, where display of the flag was permitted during the whole month of September.) This rule, however, was rarely enforced, as the flag was widely used on street celebrations, stadiums or rallies, without penal consequences.

Public buildings and private residences are required to display the flag on Navy Day (21 May), National Day (18 September) and Army Day (19 September). If the flag is displayed incorrectly or not displayed at all during these days, the person responsible may be fined.

Article 22 of the 1980 Constitution of Chile states that all inhabitants of the Republic owe respect to Chile and to its national emblems. The national emblems of Chile are the national flag, the coat of arms of the Republic and the national anthem. Pursuant to article 6 of the State Security Act of Chile (Decreto No. 890 de 1975), it is a felony against the public order to publicly mistreat the flag, the coat of arms, the name of the motherland or the national anthem.

=== On a pole ===
According to the protocol concerned, the flag should be hoisted from the tip of a white mast, and if done in company with other flags different, they must be of equal or lesser size. The Chilean flag must be set to the left if the sum of the flags is an even number or the center if the sum is an odd number. The flag must also be the first to be lifted and lowered the last.

=== Freely hanging ===
The Chilean flag can be displayed hanging either vertically or horizontally from a building or wall. In both cases, the blue square should be to the viewer's upper left.

== History ==
=== Pre-Independence flags ===
Guñelve flag

During colonial times, Chile did not use its own special flag and the symbols of the Spanish monarchy were used throughout the empire. One of the most frequently used symbols was the Cross of Burgundy, associated with the Habsburg dynasty, which was a serrated, red saltire crossed on a white cloth. In 1785, Carlos III established a uniform flag for all ships of the Spanish Armada, similar to the current flag of Spain. The use of this red-and-yellow flag would be extended in 1793 to "maritime towns, castles and coastal defenses." Despite the establishment of this new flag, the cross of Burgundy would still often used by colonial entities.

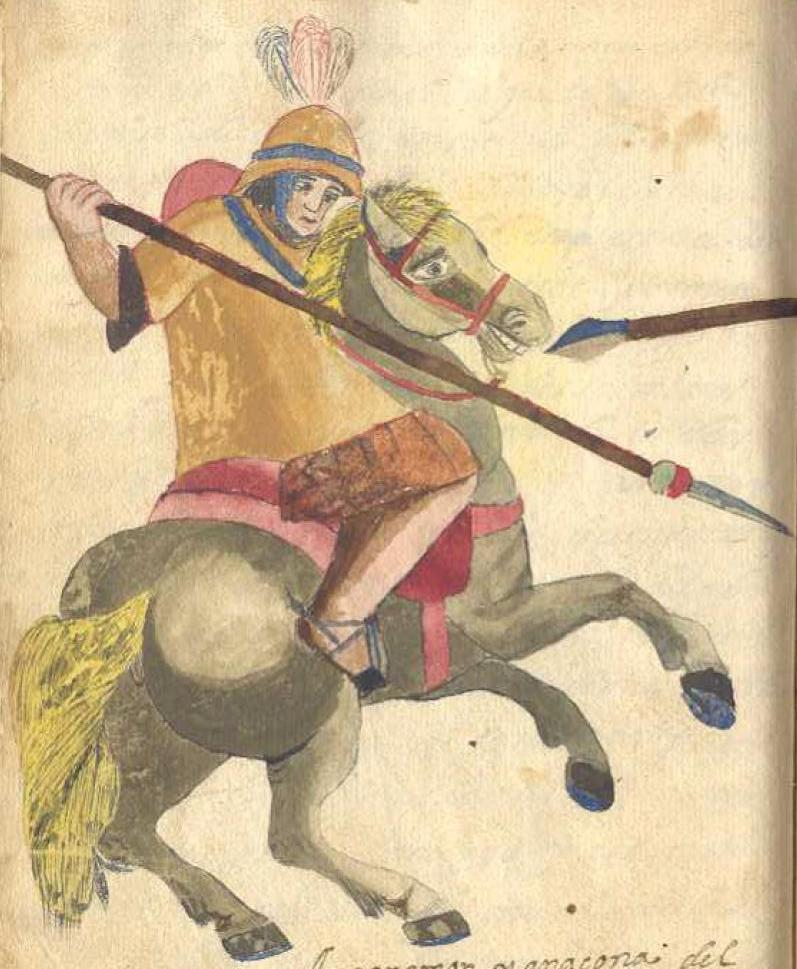
A portrait of the Mapuche chieftain Anganamón, painted at the turn of the 16th and 17th centuries by Jesuit Diego de Ocaña. His head features red, blue, and white feathers.

The Mapuche are the indigenous people of central-southern Chile who have maintained their independence from the Spanish. It is not certain when the Mapuche began using flags as a symbol, and it is unlikely that any flags existed before Spanish contact. The known early mention of the colours of blue, white and red used by Mapuche warriors comes from Canto XXI of the epic poem La Araucana, written by Alonso de Ercilla in 1569. The first flag consisted of a white star on a blue background and was first mentioned in 1839, but already then it was referred to as an old symbol. This star was a symbol for the planet Venus, known as Guñelve. One theory is that the Guñelve flag may have also influenced the Chilean flag. The white star currently placed in the canton of the Chilean flag was introduced by Bernardo O'Higgins, a member of the Lautaro Lodge.

=== Flag of the Patria Vieja (1812–1814) ===
Flag of the Patria Vieja (1812–1814)

Flag of the Patria Vieja with an added Cross of Santiago and the first coat of arms (1812–1814)

At the onset of the Chilean War of Independence, the First Government Junta was proclaimed on 18 September 1810, marking Chile's first step toward independence. It would be during the government of Jose Miguel Carrera in which the desire for emancipation would gain more strength. Nevertheless, the junta was established (at least nominally) as a way of controlling the government during the absence of King Fernando VII, so that the symbols of government remained Hispanic. Therefore, one of the first acts of his government would be the implementation of national symbols, such as an insignia, a coat of arms and a distinctive flag to identify the patriots. The first flag, according to tradition, would have been embroidered by the sister of the ruler, Javiera Carrera, and would be presented and raised for the first time on 4 July 1812 at a dinner with the United States consul Joel Roberts Poinsett to celebrate the anniversary of U.S. independence, an event having a great influence on the locals' struggle for independence.

Named the flag of the Patria Vieja ("Old Fatherland"), the flag had three horizontal stripes of blue, white and yellow. For some, the bands represent the three branches of government: majesty popular, law and force, respectively; to others, the stripes represent features of nature: the sky, the snowy Andes and fields of golden wheat, respectively. The following 30 September, during a celebration in the capital to commemorate the first government junta, the Chilean coat of arms, also called Patria Vieja, was solemnly adopted and included in the center of the flag.

Although the blue-white-yellow flag of the Patria Vieja was the most recognized, other versions utilized a different arrangement of the colors, such as white-blue-yellow, for example. On other occasions, the red Cross of Santiago was included in the upper left corner together with the coat of arms in the center. The cross originates from the victory of the patriot troops in the Battle of El Roble, where within the possessions of the captured war booty was a distinctive insignia of the Order of St. James, an important symbol of Spanish pride.

In 1813 after the royalist invasion and the outbreak of the War of Independence, the Spanish symbols were abolished and the tricolor flag was formally adopted by the patriotic forces in a ceremony at the Plaza Mayor of Santiago. Months later in 1814, Carrera left political and military power, and Francisco de la Lastra was chosen as Supreme director. The war of independence began at great losses for the patriot side, and so signed the Treaty of Lircay on 3 May 1814. This agreement reaffirmed the Spanish sovereignty over the territory of Chile, among other things, and as one of its direct consequences, the Spanish flag was readopted at the expense of the tricolor.

The flag of the Patria Vieja would wave again after Carrera's return to power 23 July 1814 until the Battle of Rancagua (1–2 October) where the royalist victory ended the patriot government and began the Reconquista (or Reconquest) from 1814 to 1817, restoring the imperial standard. The tricolor flag was last flown for the last time in the Battle of Los Papeles (Batalla de los Papeles), but it would appear again raised in the ships that José Miguel Carrera brought in 1817 and during his campaigns in Argentina (1820–1821). The Reconquista ended with the victory of Liberation Army of the Andes (Ejército Liberatador de los Andes) in the Battle of Chacabuco on 12 February 1817. In this battle, the patriot troops fought with the army colonel and the flag of the Army of the Andes, inspired by the flag of Argentina, without readopting the blue-white-yellow standard.

Today, the flag of the Patria Vieja is used during memorial services for moose Chilean historical period, conducted by the National Institute (Instituto Nacional General José Miguel Carrera), which Carrera's government founded (10 August 1813). The emblem, adopted as a symbol at the beginning of carrerismo, was subsequently adopted by Chilean nationalism movement. For example, the flag with a red lightning bolt emblem superimposed was the insignia of the National Socialist Movement of Chile between 1932 and 1938.

=== Flag of the Transition (1817–1818) ===
Flag possibly used for a few days in 1817.

Flag of the Transition (1817–1818)

The victory at the Battle of Chacabuco on 26 May 1817 gave way to a new period known as the Patria Nueva (New Fatherland). A new flag was adopted that day, known today as the Flag of the Transition (Bandera de la Transición), and it is recognized as the first national flag and the last flag used until the one used currently. It was widely publicized at the time that the design was attributed to Juan Gregorio de Las Heras. This flag had three equal stripes: blue, white, and red. The bottom red strip replaced the yellow from the flag of 1812. The origin of the flag's colors would be based on the description given by Alonso de Ercilla as those of the insignia of the Mapuche troops. The significances of these colors were equivalent to those of the Patria Vieja, except that the yellow replaced the red to represent the blood that had been shed during the many conflicts.

Despite initial enthusiasm, the flag did not obtain official legalization and disappeared five months later. One reason for its suppression was that it was easily confused with both the flag of the Netherlands and the tricolor of revolutionary France, from which it was inspired.

According to the General History of Chile by Diego Barros Arana, the last time the Flag of the Transition was unfurled was at the ceremony to commemorate the Battle of Rancagua, two weeks before the adoption of the current national flag. However, there is information about a possible third flag between the Transitional and final, which would have exchanged the order of white and blue stripes and incorporated the five-pointed white star on the central strip, but that is no certainty, and it is not accepted by the majority of Chilean historians.

=== Third and current flag ===
Original design (1818)

Flag of Chile (1818–1912)

Flag of the Liberating Expedition of Peru (1820)

Civil flag (1826–1854)

The design of the current Chilean flag is commonly attributed to Bernardo O'Higgins's Minister of War, José Ignacio Zenteno, having been designed by the Spanish soldier Antonio Arcos, although historians argue that it was Gregorio de Andía y Varela who drew it.

The flag was made official on 18 October 1817 by a decree, of which only indirect references to the absence of a copy thereof, which was officially presented during the Pledge of Independence ceremony on 12 February 1818, a ceremony in which the bearer was Tomás Guido.

The original flag was designed according to the Golden Ratio, which is reflected in the relation between the widths of the white and blue parts of the flag, as well as several elements in blue canton. The star does not appear upright in the center of the rectangular canton, instead the upper point appears slightly inclined toward the pole in such a way that the projection of its sides divide the length of the canton golden proportion. Additionally, in the center is printed the National Coat of Arms, known from the previous Flag of the Transition and adopted in 1817.

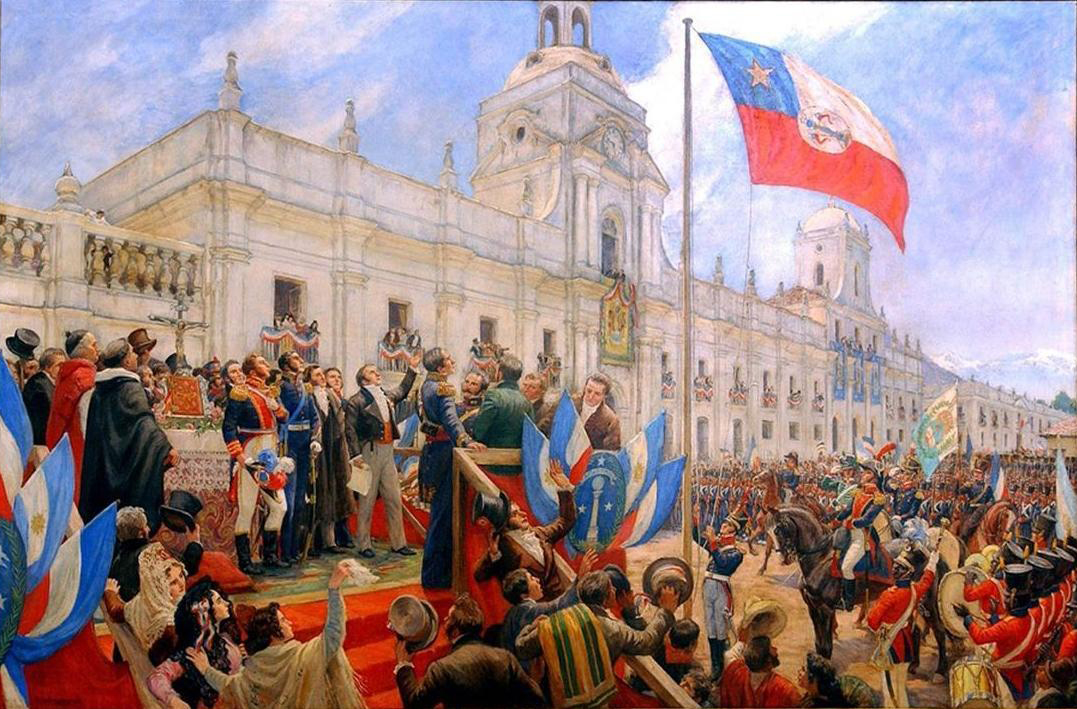
During the Declaration of Independence, today's flag was raised for the first time.

The adoption of the star configuration goes back to the star used by the Mapuches. According to O'Higgins, the star of the flag was the Star of Arauco. In Mapuche iconography, the morning star or Venus, (Mapudungun: Wünelfe or the Hispanicized Guñelve) was represented through the figure of an octagram star or a foliated cross. Although, the star which was finally adopted bore a star having five points with the design of the guñelve remaining reflected in an asterisk inserted in the center of the star, representing the combination of European and indigenous traditions.

These designs soon fell into oblivion due to the difficulty in the flag's construction. So, the embroidered seal and the eight-pointed asterisk disappeared while the star was kept completely upright. In 1854 the proportion was determined in keeping with the colors of the flag, leaving the canton as a square and the ratio of hoist to fly set to 2:3. Finally, in 1912, the diameter of the star was established, the precedence of the colors in the presidential flag and decorative cockade was determined, setting the order as blue, white and red from top to bottom or from left to right of the viewer.

All of these arrangements would later be recast into Supreme Decree No. 1534 of 1967 from the Ministry of the Interior during the government of Eduardo Frei Montalva. In this document, the national emblems, coat of arms, the rosette or cockade, and the presidential standard were established. Meanwhile, the Political Constitution of Chile of 1980 establishes in the first clause of article 222 that all inhabitants of the republic should respect Chile and its national emblems.

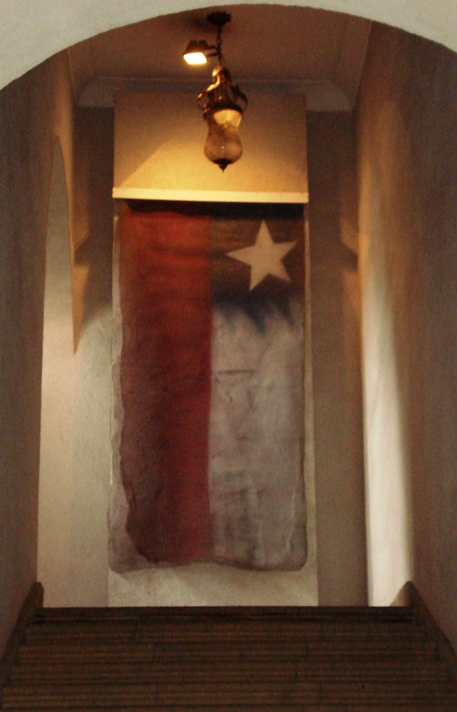
Time of Flags by the artist Ricardo Meza, located on the wall of the stairway access to the second floor of La Moneda Palace.

Few records remain of the original design, the most valuable being that of the flag used in the Declaration of Independence, which had a width of two meters and a length just over two feet. The flag was protected by various hereditary institutions until it was stolen in 1980 by members of the Revolutionary Left Movement as a protest against the military dictatorship. This group kept the specimen and returned it in late 2003 to the National Historical Museum, where it can be found today.

In 1822, during the Peruvian War of Independence, the troops of both the Liberating Expedition of Peru sent by the Chilean government and the United Liberating Army of Peru used a flag with three stars in the canton (mostly forming the Triangulum Australe constellation), representing the three nations united in the name of independence: the United Provinces, Chile and Peru.

There is a rather popular legend in Chile that claims this third Chilean flag won a "Most Beautiful National Flag in the World" contest. Its most common version states that this happened in 1907 in Blankenberge, Belgium, in the coast of the Baltic Sea [sic]. Other versions of this story say this happened in the 19th century, or that the Chilean flag was placed second after the French flag; there are even variations that talk about Chile's national anthem, placing it either in the first place or second, after La Marseillaise. The fact that the only documented version of this story gets basic details wrong (Belgium has a coast on the North Sea, not the Baltic Sea) does not reflect well on its historical accuracy.

== Pledge to the National Flag ==
In memory of the brave heroes of the Battle of La Concepcion in 1882, on 9 July each year, the very day the final Chilean soldiers in La Concepcion died in defense of the Chilean nation, this Pledge to the Flag (Juramento de la Bandera) is recited at all installations and military bases of the Chilean Army and the two Chilean Air Force educational schools, and on graduation parades of the Chilean Navy and Air Force across the nation in remembrance of this moment in Chilean history. If done for the Carabineros de Chile, it is on the service anniversary (27 April) and passing out parades of enlisted personnel. A similar pledge is done by servicemen of the Chilean Gendarmerie and the Investigations Police of Chile - in the latter the American hand over heart gesture has been executed to clearly diffenciate from its sister organizations.

English translation of the pledge - Armed Forces variant

I (name and rank) pledge, to God and this flag,
to serve my country with loyalty,
whether in sea, on land, (in the air,) or in anywhere else,
preparing thus, if needed, to sacrifice my life,
to fulfill my military duties and obligations,
in accordance with the laws and regulations in force,
to obey quickly and punctually the orders of my superior officers,
and thus invest my efforts in being a brave and honorable soldier (sailor, airman)
no matter what, for my country's sake!

English translation of the pledge - Carabineros variant

I pledge, as a constable/second lieutenant, to God and this very flag,
To serve loyally the duties of my profession,
To preserve the Constitution and laws of the republic,
And to serve and protect all citizens and the people who live in this land
Even if it needs for me to sacrifice my life
For the defense of order and the country!

English translation of the pledge - Gendarmerie variant

I (name and rank), pledge before the flag of my country,
to obey and comply with the laws and regulations concerning the Gendarmenie,
to serve loyally with the demands of this institution.

I pledge, towards my superiors, comrades and those of other organizations
to be a good example with punctually
as I serve the duties of this service even needed to do at the cost of my own life!

== Similarity to other flags ==
The flag of the U.S. state of Texas is similar to the Chilean flag. The flag of Texas was designed and adopted on 25 January 1839; whereas Chile adopted a flag similar to today's Chilean flag 22 years earlier on 18 October 1817, nearly two decades before the then-national flag was approved by the Texas Congress and President Mirabeau B. Lamar. Texas' current flag is not a copied version of the Chilean flag, contrary to popular belief. Due to the lack of a Texas flag emoji in Unicode, the Chilean flag is often used in its place in online forums. In 2017, a resolution was introduced in the Texas Legislature urging internet users to end the practice, with resolution author State Rep. Tom Oliverson seeking to "reject the notion that the Chilean flag, although it is a nice flag, can in any way compare to or be substituted for the official state flag of Texas".

On the other hand, the Chilean flag would have served as inspiration for the supporters of Cuban independence at the start the Ten Years' War in the so-called War Cry of Yara (Spanish: Grito de Yara) in 1868. The leader of this revolution, Carlos Manuel de Céspedes, would have been inspired to create the first Cuban flag named La Demajagua in honor of the place where the revolt began. Two main differences are that the red and blue colors are inverted and that the red canton extends to the middle of the fly instead of one-third as on the Chilean flag.

Céspedes would have been inspired by the Chilean flag as a way of honoring the efforts of Benjamín Vicuña Mackenna on behalf of Chile to achieve independence of Cuba after the Spanish defeat in the Chincha Islands War. According to Céspedes' son, his father "imagined a new flag that bore the same colors as that of the Carreras and O'Higgins and that would differentiate itself from the disposition of those colors." However, the flag would not have much success, and an earlier design would become the definitive Cuban flag.

Also, the Flag of Malacca, a state in Malaysia, is similar, having the same colors (except the yellow star and moon) and a similar canton design, although the proportions and color order are different.

Flag of Texas (1839)

Flag of Cuba used in the Ten Years' War (1868)

Flag of the Malaysian state of Malacca
