= Mercedes Fontecilla =

First Lady of Chile (1799–1853)

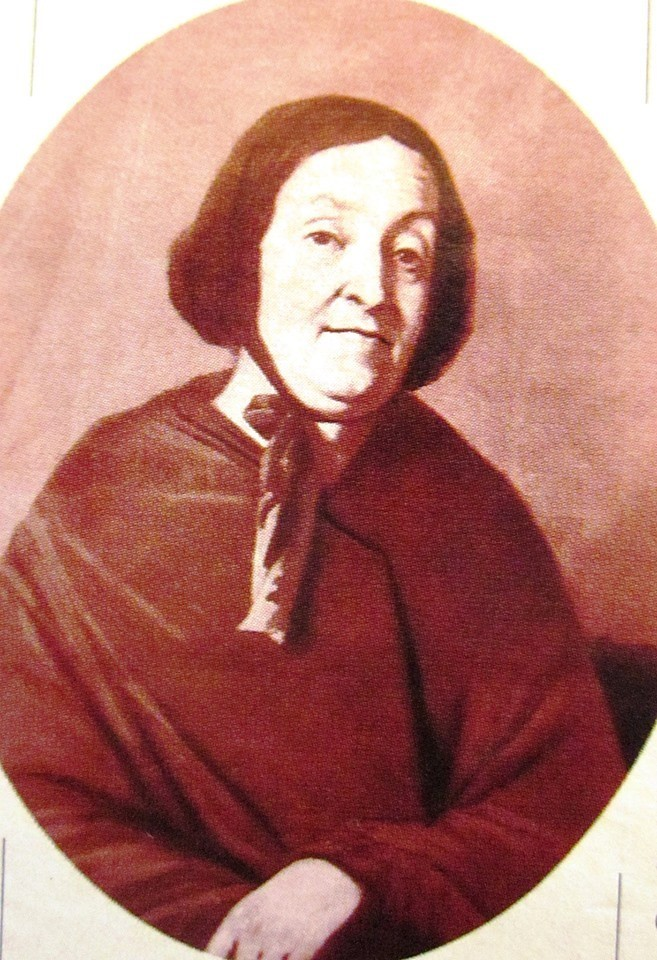

First Lady of Chile
- In role August 20, 1814 – October 2, 1814
- President: José Miguel Carrera
- Preceded by: Nicolasa Valdés
- Succeeded by: Isabel Riquelme

Personal details
- Born: María Mercedes Fontecilla y Fernández de Valdivieso; June 18, 1799 Santiago, Viceroyalty of Peru, Spanish Empire
- Died: May 5, 1853 (aged 53) Santiago, Chile
- Spouse(s): José Miguel Carrera (m. 1814; died 1821) Diego José Benavente (m. 1823)
- Children: 9

María Mercedes Fontecilla y Fernández de Valdivieso (June 18, 1799 – May 5, 1853) was a First Lady of Chile for less than two months in 1814 through her marriage to José Miguel Carrera.

== Biography ==
Fontecilla was born to Diego Antonio Fontecilla Palacios and Rosa Valdivieso Protusagasti in Santiago. On 20 August 1814, at 15, Fontecilla married 29 year old José Miguel Carrera, a political leader in Chile, at the Santiago Metropolitan Cathedral. Less than two months later, Carrera's forces were defeated in the Battle of Rancagua and the family, including Carrera's two brothers, fled to Mendoza, Argentina. While there, Fontecilla passed secret information between military personnel and sewed clothing for soldiers. Fontecilla supported and was affectionate towards her husband despite his long absences to Anapolis, Montevideo, and Buenos Aires as he sought allies to fight for Chilean independence.

In 1821, Carrera was handed over to Colonel José Albino Gutiérrez as prisoner by his own men. Within days, he was tried, sentenced, and executed. The morning of his death, he wrote Mercedes a letter, in which he told her of his imminent execution and expressed regret for leaving her to care for their five children. Following Carrera's death, Fontecilla and her children lived in extreme poverty in Rosario. Eventually, Bernardo O'Higgins, Chile's Supreme Director and one of Carrera's main enemies, allowed them to return to Chile, largely due to "good public relations... [so the public would think] '[O'Higgins] was as generous as he was courageous.'" She later married politician Diego José Benavente, with whom she had four children.

== Family ==
- Marriage: José Miguel Carrera (1814-1821, his death)
  - Francisca Javiera Carrera Fontecilla (1817-1850; wife of Francisco Javier Valdés Aldunate and mother of José Miguel Valdés)
  - Roberta Carrera Fontecilla
  - Rosa Carrera Fontecilla (1819-1862; wife of Ambrosio Aldunate Carvajal, mother of Luis Aldunate)
  - Josefa Carrera Fontecilla (1820-1898; wife of José Ramón Lira Calvo)
  - José Miguel Carrera Fontecilla (es) (1820-1860); husband of Emilia Pinto Benavente, father of Ignacio Carrera Pinto)
- Marriage: Diego José Benavente
  - José Benjamín Benavente Fontecilla (husband of Rosa Vargas González)
  - Mercedes Quiteria Benavente Fontecilla (wife of Miguel Calvo Valenzuela)
  - Mariana Benavente Fontecilla
  - Carolina Benavente Fontecilla

== Legacy ==
There is a school in the Quilicura area of Santiago, Chile named Escuela Mercedes Fontecilla de Carrera. Javiera Díaz de Valdés, a descendent of Fontecilla's sister-in-law Javiera Carrera, portrayed her in the Chilean miniseries Héroes.

== See also ==
- Carrera family
- First Lady of Chile

Honorary titles
Preceded by Nicolasa Valdés	First Lady of Chile	Succeeded by Isabel Riquelme
