= Clemente de Lantaño =

Chilean military officer (1774–1846)

Clemente de Lantaño Pino
- Born: July 31, 1774; Chillán Viejo, Ñuble, Chile
- Died: 10 May 1846 Chile
- Allegiance: Spanish Empire (until 1821); Chile (1821–1846)
- Branch: Royalist Army (Chile); Chilean Army
- Service years: 1814–1846
- Rank: Lieutenant Colonel
- Commands: Guerrilla forces (Royalist side); Patriot forces (after 1821)
- Conflicts: Chilean War of Independence
- Other work: Negotiator, Military Leader

Clemente de Lantaño Pino (31 July 1774 - 10 May 1846) was a royalist military officer during the Chilean War of Independence. Later, during the Spanish reconquest, he changed sides and fought for independence against the royalist forces.

== Biography ==
Before the beginning of the war, Lantaño was a well-connected large estate owner in the Ñuble Region. In 1814 Spanish Brigadier Gabino Gaínza put him in command of one of his main guerrilla columns, with the rank of lieutenant colonel.

He participated in the Battle of El Roble, the Battle of Membrillar and the Disaster of Rancagua, among other military actions. But the capture in 1814 of the Carrera brothers, José Miguel and Luis, was what made him famous within the army.

After the Battle of Maipú in 1818, he continued fighting with the royalists on the south shore of the Río Bío-Bío until he accompanied Colonel Juan Francisco Sánchez in the exhausting retreat to Valdivia in 1819. From there he went on to Peru by sea in order to continue serving the royalist cause.

In Peru he was welcomed by Viceroy Joaquín de la Pezuela. In 1821, before the arrival of the rebel forces of José de San Martín, the viceroy ordered him to prepare the defense of the Department of Ancash. Against the forces that he organized in Huaraz, the rebels sent troops from Supe under the command of Colonel Enrique Campino. The attackers surprised the city. Lantaño was taken prisoner and sent back to Chile.

Bernardo O'Higgins, who knew him before the revolution (because both were powerful neighbors in the same province), offered to recognize his rank if he joined the patriot army. Lantaño, apparently convinced of the hopelessness of the royalist cause, accepted the offer.

He was commissioned the same year to mediate with the royal governor of Chiloé, Antonio de Quintanilla. Lantaño proposed in the name of the government of Santiago the incorporation of the archipelago of the recently created Chilean Republic, trying to convince Quintanilla of the inevitable defeat of Spanish arms in Chile. The mission, however, was unsuccessful, because Quintanilla did not accept Lantaño's view of the situation.

Returning to the territory held by the rebels, he fought in the Guerra a muerte (War to the Death, or the final phase of the Chilean War of Independence), together with Captain Manuel Bulnes. In 1821 he negotiated the surrender of the royalist camp at Quilapalo. In 1823 he led a punitive expedition against the guerrillas of the Pincheira brothers in the mountains of Ñuble.

== Sources ==
- Biblioteca de Congreso Nacional de Chile
