= Antonio de Quintanilla =

Spanish brigadier and Governor of Chiloé

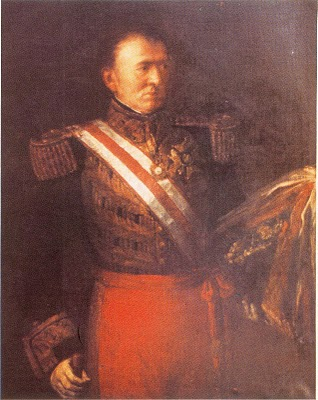

Royal Governor of Chiloé
- In office 1820–1826
- Monarch: Ferdinand VII
- Preceded by: Ignacio María Justiz y Urrutia

Personal details
- Born: 1787 Pámanes, Spain
- Died: 1863 (aged 75–76) Almería, Spain

Military service
- Allegiance: Spain
- Rank: Brigadier
- Battles/wars: Chilean War of Independence; Battle of Yerbas Buenas; Battle of San Carlos; Siege of Chillán; Battle of El Roble; Battle of Rancagua; Battle of Chacabuco; Battle of Agüi

Antonio Quintanilla (14 November 1787 - 1863) was a Spanish brigadier and Governor of Chiloé from 1820 to 1826. He was the last royalist to hold the position.

== Early life ==
Quintanilla was the son of Francisco de Quintanilla and Teresa Herrera y Santiago, who were members of distinguished families in the Spanish region of Pámanes. He was born November 14, 1787. He married Antonia Álvarez de Garay, the daughter of Captain Francisco alvarez and Bartola Garay. Quintanilla was the father of Antonio de Quintanilla Alvarez, a Spanish official given the Carlist title of Marquis de Quintanilla.

== Chilean War of Independence ==
Quintanilla moved to southern Chile, where he joined the cavalry and was uninvolved in politics until the outbreak of the Chilean War of Independence. When the war broke out he fought under José Antonio Pareja as a captain. Quintanilla defeated a force led by Luis de la Cruz on 1 July 1813. Along the Biobío River he launch numerous raids.

Quintanilla wrote in his memoirs that either side would have won during the early portion of the war of independence if they had two companies that could properly manoeuver and retain formation. No Spanish soldiers were fighting in the war at the time and the royalist forces were made up of locals.

The Abascal Carabineros cavalry squadron was formed by Quintanilla in August 1814, and he led it as a lieutenant colonel. Under his leadership he led this group victory at the Battle of Rancagua and captured Rancagua and Santiago.

In 1817, Quintanilla fought against José de San Martín in Chacabuco Province, but was unable to defeat him. All communication between the Chiloé Archipelago and the mainland was interrupted after the Battle of Chacabuco. At the end of the year Quintanilla arrived and took command of Chiloé. He organised a militia with 400 rifles. Contact with the mainland was not restarted until November 1821, and by that time the Spanish forces had been defeated.

== Governor of Chiloé ==
As a governor of Chiloé, Quintanilla ordered in 1824 the construction of Fuerte Real de San Carlos. He is also noted for defeating Ramón Freire's first attempt to liberate Chiloé in 1825 after he dissolved the Chilean congress by force.

A Chilean military expedition under the command of Ramón Freire was defeated by Quintanilla in 1824. On 19 January 1826, Quintanilla surrendered to Chilean forces, ending the war of independence. He was the last Spanish governor of Chile.

== Works cited ==
- Barros Arana, Diego (1856). Las Campañas De Chiloe (1820-1826). El Ferrocarril.
- Clissold, Stephen (1968). Bernardo O'Higgins and the Independence of Chile. Rupert Hart-Davis. ISBN 0246985593.
- Collier, Simon (1967). Ideas and Politics of Chilean Independence: 1808-1833. Cambridge University Press.

Government offices
Preceded by Ignacio María Justiz y Urrutia	Royal Governor of Chiloé; 1820-1826	Succeeded by None
