= Ignacio de la Carrera =

Chilean aristocrat (1747–1819)

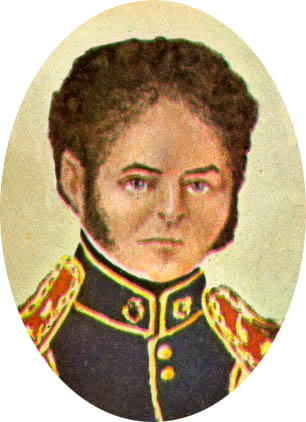
Ignacio de la Carrera

Ignacio de la Carrera y Cuevas (1747–1819) was a Chilean aristocrat, member of the First Government Junta of Chile, and father of the Carrera brothers, who were some of the most important leaders of the early Chilean struggles for independence during the period of the Patria Vieja ("Old Republic"). Ignacio de la Carrera was of Basque descent.

== Life ==
He was born in Santiago in 1747, the son of Ignacio de la Carrera y Ureta and Javiera de las Cuevas y Pérez de Valenzuela. He inherited a very considerable fortune from his parents, specially his father, who had been a mining entrepreneur.
He married Francisca de Paula Verdugo Fernández de Valdivieso y Herrera with whom he had four children:

- Javiera (1781–1862),
- Juan José (1782–1818),
- José Miguel (1785–1821),
- Luis (1791–1818),

who all went to become some of the most important early leaders of the Chilean struggle for independence.

He began his military career at the end of the 18th century by joining the militia, and later, in 1777, the Prince's Cavalry Regiment. Notwithstanding his military career, he continued taking care of the family business, and was considered one of the wealthiest men in Chile. His family was a member of the highest Aristocracy of the colony, and because of that, he was elected on 18 September 1810 as a member of the First Government Junta of Chile, in spite of his personal sympathy for monarchism. This event propelled him into a very active political participation.

In 1811, he became a member of the Superior Court of Government, and in 1812, the Provisional Government Junta. In 1814, when the Spanish authorities resumed power in Chile, he was arrested and sent exiled to the Juan Fernández Islands. A lengthy judicial process was opened against him for his and his family's participation in the first attempt at independent government.

He only was allowed to return to Chile in 1817, together with the rest of all the prisoners of Juan Fernandez. Nonetheless, he had to face the hard reality that his family was scattered, persecuted and exiled in Argentina. His sons Juan José and Luis were executed in the city of Mendoza on 8 April 1818, while Javiera and José Miguel were still in exile, one in Uruguay and the other fighting in Argentina. The Chilean government forced him to pay the cost of the public execution of his sons in Argentina. This last event finally broke his spirit, and he died in Santiago less than a year later.

== See also ==
- History of Chile
- Carrera family
