= Treaty of Lircay =

1814 truce during the Chilean War of Independence

Treaty of Lircay (May 3, 1814) was a truce treaty agreed between the Royalist and the Patriot forces during the Chilean War of Independence.

== Background ==
Due to the exhaustion of both armies in conflict after the long 1813 campaign and the battles of El Membrillar and Quechereguas, the arrival of the English captain of HMS Phoebe, James Hillyar with instructions from the Viceroy of Peru José Fernando de Abascal to negotiate with the rebels was considered opportune.

The treaty was signed on the banks of the Lircay River, about 7 kilometres (4.3 mi) outside the city of Talca by the commander of the Royal Armies in the province of Concepción, brigadier Gabino Gaínza, and the representatives of the Chilean Supreme Director Francisco de la Lastra, brigadiers Bernardo O'Higgins and Juan Mackenna.

It was during these negotiations that O'Higgins met José Antonio Rodríguez Aldea, who was the secretary of the Royalist Commander, and who later went on to become O'Higgins' minister of finance and one of the main causes of his unpopularity and eventual downfall.

== The agreement ==
The treaty was composed of 16 articles, plus a preamble. In the preamble, the treaty laid all blame for the destruction of the Kingdom on the Carrera family (without directly naming them). In the document proper the patriots reaffirmed their loyalty to King Ferdinand VII, defined Chile as an integral part of the Spanish monarchy, and promised to financially help the Spanish treasury within the economic possibilities of the country, to send deputies to the Cortes of Cádiz, to abandon the use of their own flag and re-adopt the royal standard and to pull back all patriot troops north of the Lontué River.

The royalists on the other hand accepted the existence of a Chilean provisional government, and committing to vacate the city of Talca, withdraw most of their forces south of the Maule River and leave the Province of Concepción. The treaty also included other general dispositions such as the end of all acts of war between both armies, the exchange of prisoners of war, the restitution of all properties confiscated by the Chileans to the Royalist supporters and the payment of the debts incurred by the Royal Army in their Chilean campaign.

== Results ==
Everything indicated that the treaty was nothing else except a way in which both sides could obtain a truce. Gaínza did not abandon his positions by the agreed date, nor did the rebels live up to the agreement. The only practical results of the treaty were that it caused a cease-fire and created a de facto frontier on the Maule River.

After the signature of the treaty, the patriots did not move north of the Lontué River and remained garrisoned in Talca. On the other hand, Brigadier Gaínza retreated to Chillán but did not leave the area by the time agreed, deciding instead to remain in the city waiting for reinforcements. When his officers remonstrated him for his former concessions, he calmed them down by telling them that he had no intention of complying with those parts of the agreement. In addition, the treaty specified that war prisoners would be released but this measure didn’t apply to the Carrera brothers who had been captured on March 4 by one of his militia units, commanded by Clemente Lantaño. The patriots had inserted a secret clause that established that these men would be handed over to the government and deported later on, due to the political instability that their freedom implied. Nevertheless, Gaínza freed José Miguel Carrera and Luis Carrera.

Upon their arrival to Santiago, José Miguel Carrera refused to accept the agreements of Lircay and started his second (third for some authorities) dictatorship by deposing Supreme Director Lastra via a coup of State on July 23. In the meantime, Viceroy Abascal was infuriated when he read the text of the Treaty and removed Gaínza from command, replacing him with Brigadier Mariano Osorio and sending the latter to Chile at the head of a new expedition of 5,000 men. Not content with that, he had Gaínza court martialed in Lima, accused of exceeding his orders.

Carrera's seizure of power was not accepted by O’Higgins, who along with his troops marched towards Santiago, being defeated in the Battle of Tres Acequias (August 26) by soldiers commanded by Luis Carrera. Immediately after the battle, the news of the arrival of the Osorio expedition filtered and this obligated the supporters of O’Higginis and of Carrera to stop their infights to unite themselves in the defense of the revolution. However, the patriot forces succumbed before the royalists in the disaster of Rancagua (October 2), which forced most of the patriots to emigrate to Mendoza.
