= Juan Mackenna =

Chilean military officer (1771–1814)

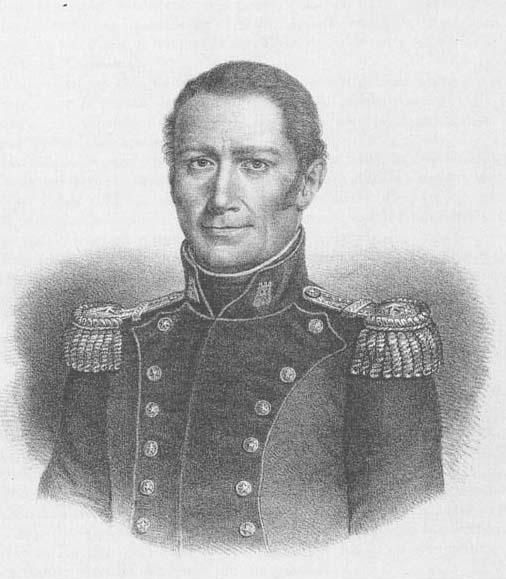
- Born: John MacKenna; 26 October 1771; Clogher, County Tyrone, Ireland
- Died: 21 November 1814 (aged 43); Buenos Aires, United Provinces of the Río de la Plata
- Spouse: Josefina Vicuña y Larraín
- Relatives: Alejandro O'Reilly (uncle); Benjamín Vicuña Mackenna (grandson); Carmela Mackenna (great-granddaughter)
- Military career
- Allegiance: Spain; Chile
- Conflicts: Siege of Ceuta; War of the Pyrenees; Battle of Peyrestortes; Battle of Truillas; Siege of Roses; Chilean War of Independence; Battle of Yerbas Buenas; Battle of San Carlos; Siege of Chillán; Battle of El Roble; Battle of Membrillar

Brigadier Juan Mackenna O'Reilly (né John MacKenna; 26 October 1771 – 21 November 1814) was an Irish-born, Chilean military officer and hero of the Chilean War of Independence. He is considered to have been the creator of the Corps of Military Engineers of the Chilean Army.

== Early life ==
Mackenna was born John MacKenna (Irish: Seán Mac Cionnaith) on 26 October 1771 in Clogher, County Tyrone to William MacKenna of Willville House, near Monaghan, and Eleanor MacKenna (née O'Reilly).

Raised in a Catholic family, Mackenna was the maternal nephew of the Spanish Army general Alejandro O'Reilly. In 1784, O'Reilly arranged for Mackenna to enroll in the Royal Military Academy of Mathematics in Barcelona. Mackenna also trained at the Royal Military Academy as a Military Engineer between 1785 and 1791.

=== Military career ===
Appointed as a cadet in the Spanish Army Engineers Corps in 1787, Mackenna served during 1787 and 1788 in Ceuta under Lieutenant Colonel Luis Urbina, and was promoted to Second Lieutenant. In 1791 Mackenna resumed his studies in Barcelona and acted as liaison with mercenaries recruited in Europe. The following year he was promoted to Lieutenant in the Royal Regiment of Engineers. In the War of the Pyrenees against the French, Juan Mackenna fought in Rosselló under General Ricardos and there met the future liberator of Argentina, José de San Martín. For his exploits in defence of the Plaza de Rozas, he was promoted to captain in 1795. By 1796 was frustrated at the lack of further advancement and obtained permission to leave for Peru.

== Career in Chile ==
For the purpose of a new assignment, in October 1796, Juan Mackenna left Spain for South America. He arrived in Buenos Aires and then travelled to Mendoza and to Chile across the Andes and then to Peru. Once in Lima, he contacted Ambrosio O'Higgins, another Irishman, at that time Viceroy of Perú, who named him Governor of Osorno and put him in charge of the reconstruction works for this southern Chilean town.

In this capacity, Juan Mackenna convinced the families of Castro, on the island of Chiloé, to move to Osorno to found a colony there. He built the storehouse and two mills, as well as the road between Osorno and present-day Puerto Montt. His successful administration provoked jealousy from Chile's captain-general Gabriel de Avilés, who feared that Juan Mackenna and Ambrosio O'Higgins would create an Irish colony in Osorno. Both Irishmen were loyal to the Spanish crown, though Juan Mackenna had good relations with O'Higgins' son Bernardo, the future emancipator of Chile, and was also connected with the Venezuelan Francisco de Miranda and his group of supporters of South American independence. When Ambrosio O'Higgins died in 1801, Avilés was appointed viceroy of Peru. It took him eight years to remove O'Higgins's protégé Juan Mackenna from Osorno.

=== Revolutionary wars ===
In 1809 Juan Mackenna married Josefina Vicuña y Larraín, an eighteen-year-old Chilean woman from a family with revolutionary connections, with whom he had three children: María del Carmen Dolores, Juan Francisco María del Tránsito, and Félix. After the Declaration of Chilean Independence in 1810, he adhered to the Patriot side and was commissioned by the first Chilean government to prepare a plan for the defense of the country and oversaw the equipment of the new Chilean Army. At this juncture he trained the first military engineers for the new army.

The following year he was called to the defence committee of the new Republic of Chile, and in 1811 was appointed governor of Valparaíso. Owing to political feuds with José Miguel Carrera and his brothers, Juan Mackenna was dismissed from the post and taken prisoner. He was a firm ally of Bernardo O'Higgins, who appointed him as one of the key officers to fight the Spanish army of General Antonio Pareja. Mackenna's major military honour was attained in 1814 at the Battle of Membrillar, in which the general assured a temporary collapse of the royal forces.

As a reward for his victory, he was appointed commandant-general by Bernardo O'Higgins, but after a coup d'état led by Luis Carrera he was exiled to Argentina in 1814, when Carrera took over power. Juan Mackenna died in Buenos Aires late in 1814, after a duel with Luis Carrera.

== Public commemoration in Monaghan ==
A bust of General MacKenna was publicly presented to Monaghan County Museum on 5 August 2004 by his direct descendant es:Luis Valentín Ferrada. At the presentation ceremony General MacKenna, the man "unreservedly regarded as the greatest of County Monaghan's exiles" was commemorated in speeches by Most Rev. Dr Joseph Duffy, Bishop of Clogher and by his descendant Senor Ferrada who declared, "In this city of Monaghan, very near to Willville House, the tombs of my ancestors are in the old cemetery. There, my own blood is interred in the sacred earth."

== Family ==
Mackenna was the great-grandfather of Chilean composer Carmela Mackenna.

== See also ==
- Treaty of Lircay
- Chilean War of Independence
- History of Chile
- Benjamín Vicuña Mackenna

== Sources ==
- Barros Arana, Diego (1855). Historia Jeneral de la Independencia de Chile (in Spanish). Vol. I–IV. Santiago, Chile: Imprenta del Ferrocarril.
- Gay, Claudio (1856). Historia de la Independencia Chilena (in Spanish). Vol. I & II. Paris, France: Imprenta de E. Thunot y Cia.
- Tellez Yañez, Raúl (1952). El General Juan Mackenna: Héroe del Membrillar (Ensayo histórico) (in Spanish). Santiago, Chile: Editorial Alonso de Ovalle.
- Vicuña Mackenna, Benjamín (1857). El Ostracismo de los Carreras (in Spanish). Santiago, Chile: Imprenta del Ferrocarril. pp. 553.
- Zapiola, José (1872–1876). Recuerdos de treinta años (1810-1840) (in Spanish). Vol. I & II. Santiago, Chile: Imprenta de El Independiente. p. 310.
- Murray, Edmundo. "Juan Mackenna". Dictionary of Irish Latin American Biography.
