= Javiera Carrera =

Chilean independence activist

- Born: March 1, 1781; Santiago, Chile
- Died: August 20, 1862 (aged 81); Santiago, Chile

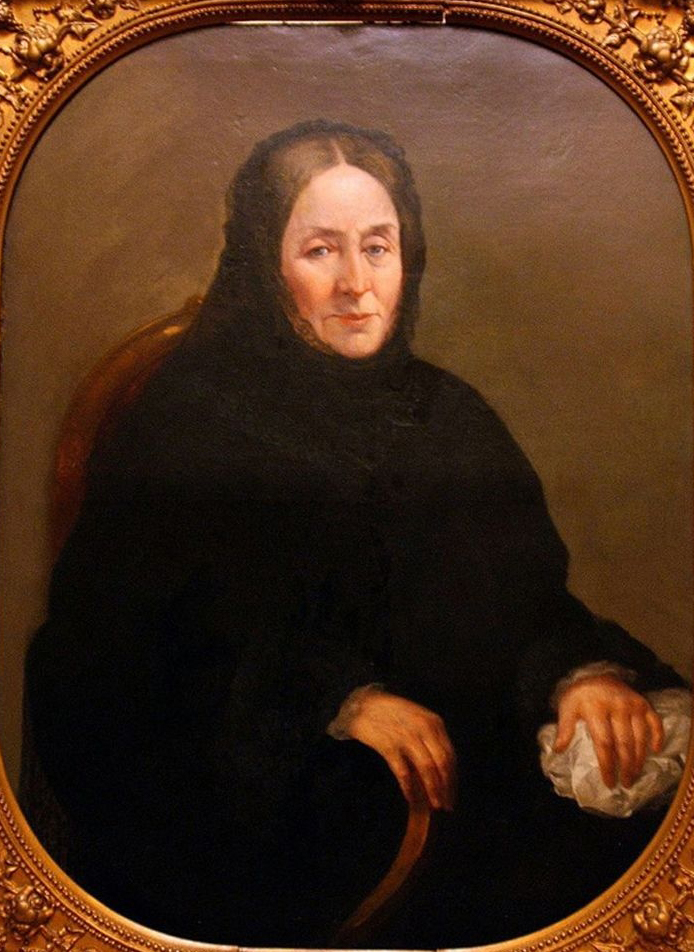
Javiera Carrera in her old age. Anonymous painter, 19th century.

Francisca Xaviera Eudoxia Rudecinda Carmen de los Dolores de la Carrera y Verdugo (March 1, 1781 – August 20, 1862), better known as Javiera Carrera, was a Chilean independence activist. Together with her brothers José Miguel, Juan José and Luis, she was one of the leading figures of the early Chilean struggle for independence during the period known as the Patria Vieja ("Old Republic"). She is credited with having sewn the first national flag of Chile and is considered to be the "Mother of Chile".

She was a member of one of the most aristocratic Chilean families, the Carrera family of Basque origin. who actively participated in the Chilean War of Independence.

== Life ==
She was born in Santiago, the oldest child of Ignacio de la Carrera y Cuevas and of Francisca de Paula Verdugo Fernández de Valdivieso y Herrera. From her youth, she was well known because of her beauty and strong character. She married young, on May 2, 1796, to Manuel de la Lastra y de la Sotta, with whom she had two children: Manuel and Dolores. He died in 1798. She remarried in 1800 to the Spanish aristocrat, Pedro Díaz de Valdés. They had five children: Pedro, Domitila, Pío, Santos and Ignacio.

During the time of the Patria Vieja ("Old Republic"), she became the firmest supporter of her family in their struggle to achieve an independent Chile. This struggle for independence affected many Chilean families, leading to politics being introduced into family dynamics. The Carreras were no exception, and she took many actions to support her family's goals. Women often acted as couriers, petitioners, activists, spies, and other roles that supported the movement for Chilean independence. She organized and supported all the social organizations that lent their support to the nascent government. At that time she sewed the first Chilean flag (1812). Due to all of her activities, she became the visible face and heroine of those early struggles.

After the Spanish Reconquista of 1814, she went into exile, together with her brothers, to Argentina. She lived first in the city of Mendoza, was jailed in Luján, later was imprisoned in a convent in Buenos Aires by pro-San Martin forces, who were allied with O'Higgins and were enemies of the brothers Carrera. She escaped and took refuge in a Brazilian ship, bound for the city of Montevideo, in Uruguay. There she received the news of the executions of her brothers Juan José and Luis in 1818, and of José Miguel in 1821. She didn't return to Chile until three years later, in 1824, one year after the resignation and exile of Bernardo O'Higgins, whom she considered responsible for their deaths.

Once in Chile, she dedicated all her energies to having her brothers' bodies, who had been buried in the Claustro de la Caridad in Mendoza, repatriated. President Francisco Antonio Pinto did so in 1828. She lived the rest of her life very quietly in her hacienda of El Monte, where she died in August 1862.

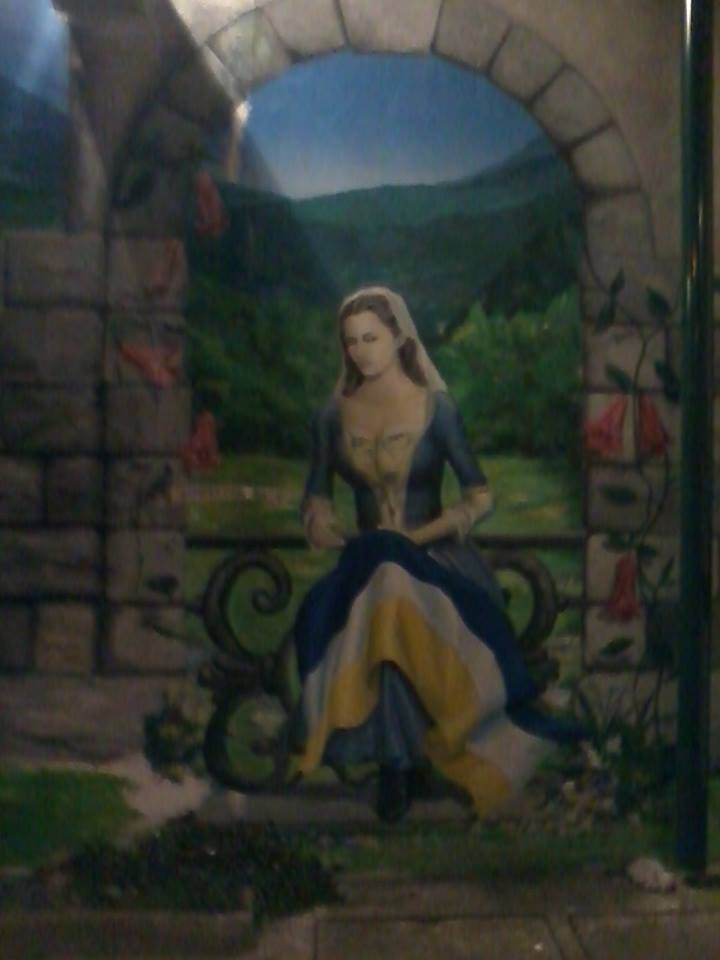
Javiera Carrera makes the first national flag. Bicentennial Mural of the Roggendorf Pastry Shop, Concepción

== Exile ==
In 1814, when Spain reconquered Chile, Javiera abandoned her husband and children to go into self-exile and to follow the footsteps of her three brothers. Together with them, she traveled to the United Provinces of Río de la Plata, lived in Mendoza and later moved to Buenos Aires where she was received by the priest Bartolomé Tollo, an old friend of the family. Javiera often wrote letters to her husband during her exile, she stated in the letters that her leave of her family was to protect them due to her family connection. She also stated that the leave she took of her family deeply hurt her and that she had taken her son Perico as consolation for her troubles.

She had difficult times in Buenos Aires: due to health problems and a financial disaster. At that time she began a romantic relationship with the Argentine nationalized American captain David Jewett.

She directed the so-called "conspiracy of 1817" against O'Higgins, which ultimately meant the execution of her brothers Luis and Juan José in 1818, in Mendoza.

== Final years ==
She remained in retirement until her last days on herd estate in El Monte, concentrating on domestic life and charitable works. She accomplished the repatriation of the bodies of her brothers in 1828 under the presidency of Francisco Antonio Pinto.

She died at her hacienda in Santiago on August 20, 1862. Since 1952, her body has been lying with her brothers in the Santiago Metropolitan Cathedral.

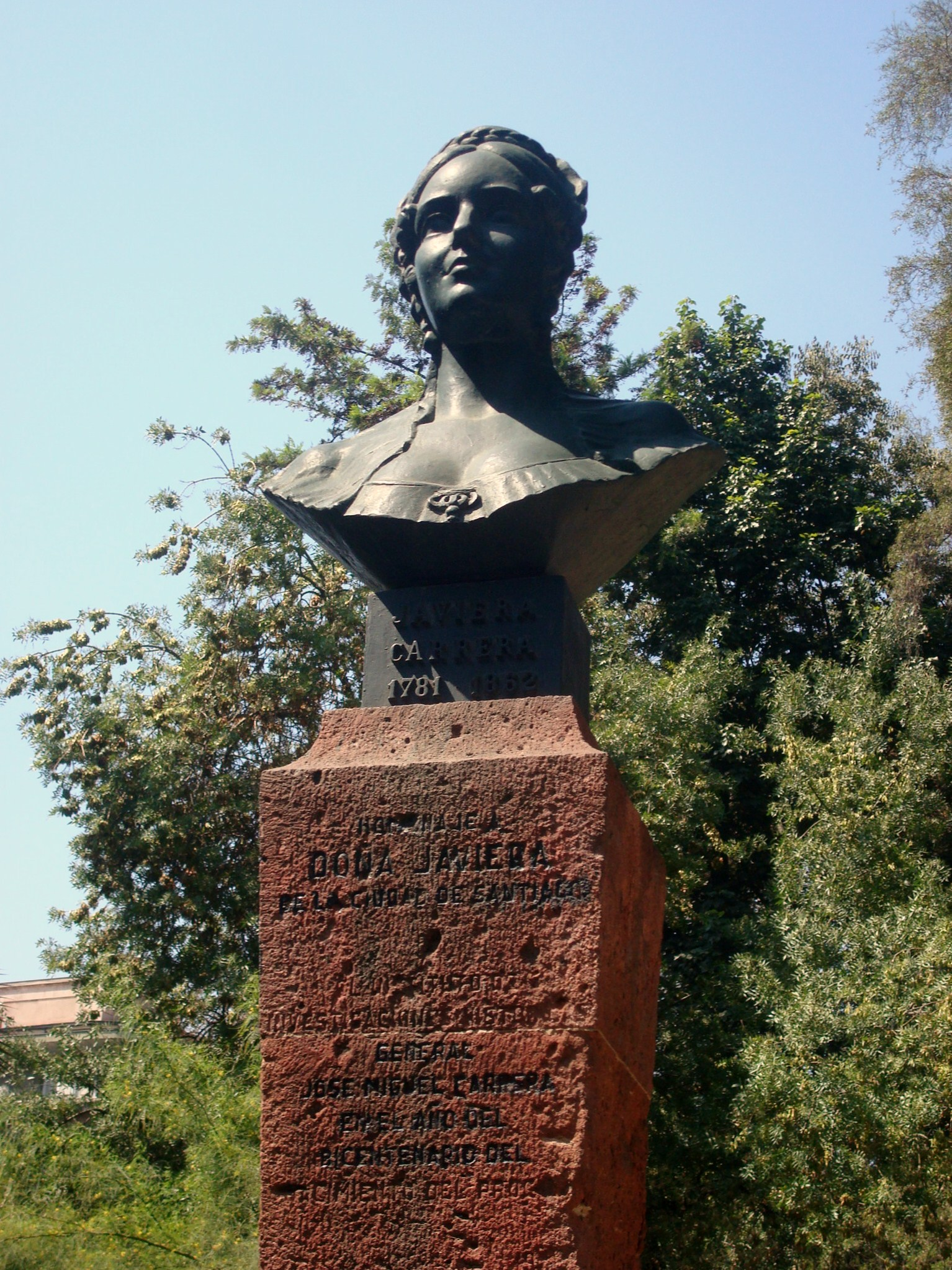
Bust of Javiera Carrera in Cerro Santa Lucía, Santiago.

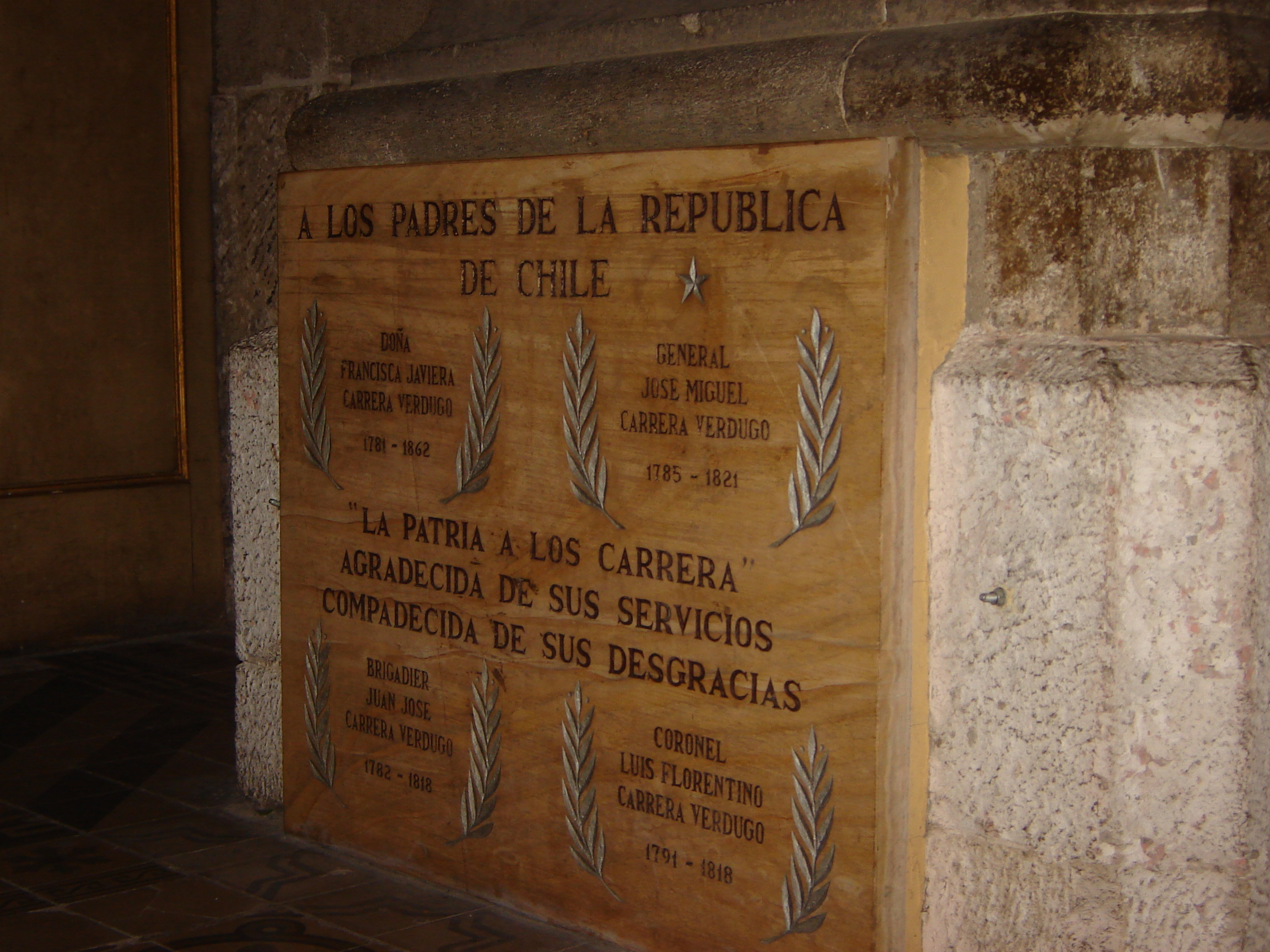
Tomb of the Carrera brothers in the Metropolitan Cathedral of Santiago.

== Legacy ==
Carrera is seen as a symbol of a Chilean woman standing up to authority like Paula Jaraquemada and Inés Suárez. She is still mentioned as a role model to contemporary protesters against mistreatment.

One of the most prestigious girls-only public schools in Santiago, Chile is named after her, the Liceo A-1 Javiera Carrera (Public High School A-1 Javiera Carrera). One of its most famous students is the former Chilean president, Michelle Bachelet.

Javiera Carrera was the object of admiration during the 19th century. Maria Graham, Miguel Luis Amunátegui, Vicente Grez and Benjamín Vicuña Mackenna wrote works that highlighted her patriotism and the defense of her brothers, portraying her as a strong, determined and educated woman.

== See also ==
- History of Chile
- Carrera family
