= Battle of Las Tres Acequias =

1814 battle of the Chilean War of Independence

Coordinates: 33°38′44″S 70°44′07″W

- Part of the Chilean War of Independence
Date	August 26, 1814
Location	Near the Maipo river, San Bernardo
Result	Victory for Carrera

Belligerents
Carreristas	O'Higginistas

Commanders and leaders
Luis Carrera	Bernardo O'Higgins

Strength
estimated 600 infantry, 200 cavalry, 800 mounted militia, no numbers for artillery	400 infantry, 200 cavalry, 4 guns

Casualties and losses
Few losses	26 dead, 2 guns captured, 37 hurt

The Battle of Les Tres Acequias, fought during the Chilean War of Independence, occurred near San Bernardo on 26 August 1814. The confrontation occurred between the two factions of Carrera and Bernardo O'Higgins, resulting in a defeat for O'Higgins that would in turn lead on to the defeat of the nationalists by the royalist forces at the battle of Rancagua a month later.

== Background ==
On 23 July, after two months of arguing with the Supreme Director Francisco de la Lastra, and unable to retreat to Argentina, José Miguel Carrera seized power in Chile once again, dismissing the Director and installing a new junta. Carrera had refused to accept the Treaty of Lircay, signed by Francisco's government. The treaty would have overturned many acts of the governments in the last few years, including removing the Chilean flag created during the administration of Carrera, and introducing acts of devotion to King Fernando VII and a promise of absolutist restoration. On a more personal level, the negotiations over the treaty had not included provision for the exchange of prisoners; Carrera was a prisoner of the royalists in Chillán at the time of the signature of the treaty, before then escaping from royal custody to join other patriots in exile in Mendoza, Argentina.

O'Higgins, meanwhile, was still the commander in chief of Francisco's government, and had acquiesced to the signature of the treaty. O'Higgins marched from Talca towards Santiago with a division of troops to remove Carrera. O'Higgins regarded Carrera and his political faction as being responsible for the military failures of the earlier campaign, as well as the previous overthrow of O'Higgins' political mentor, Juan Martínez de Rozas. In the eve of the battle O'Higgins encamped in the Mardones property, to the south of Maipo River, waiting for Carrera's forces, overnighting at the small hamlet of Pérez farm.

== The battle ==
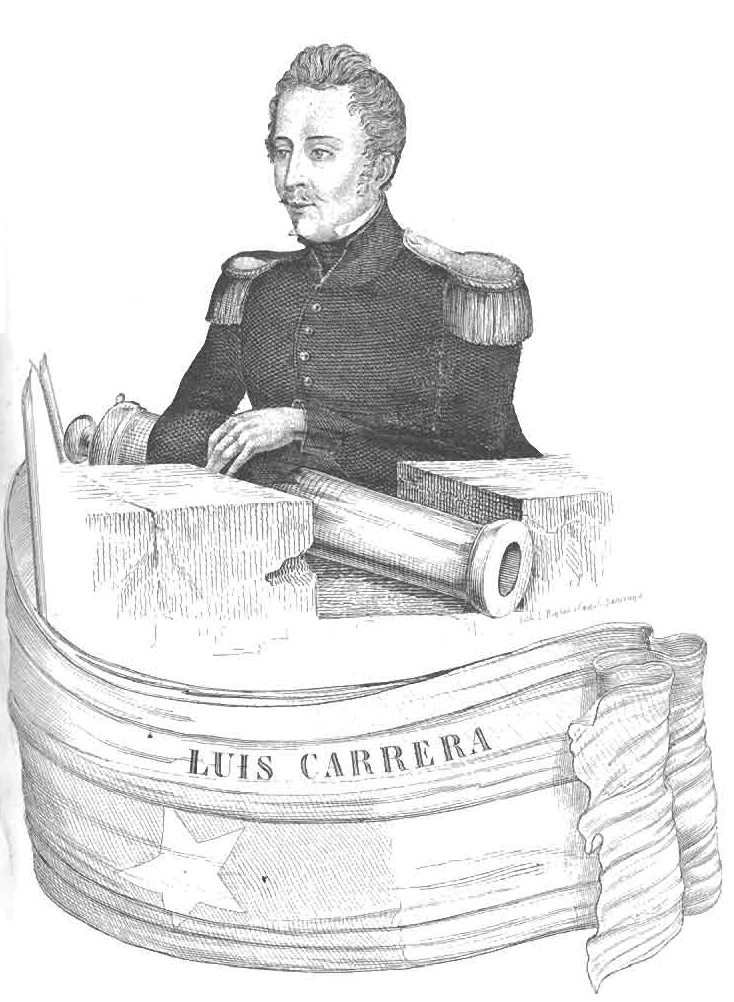
Luis Carrera, younger brother and commander of José Miguel Carrera's army at Las Tres Acequias

On the morning of 26 August, the then brigadier O'Higgins crossed the Maipo River and on to the level ground on the other side. His intention was to advance rapidly on Santiago and thereby to defeat Carrera; because of this, he did not initially realise the size and disposition of Carrera's forces. At 13:00 hours, O' Higgins' advance parties, under the command of Ramon Freire, joined combat with the forward echelons of Carrera's forces, under the command of José's youngest brother, Colonel Luis Carrera, protected by a low bank. Luis Carrera had deployed his forces with the infantry to his right, the artillery to the centre, his cavalry to his left and behind these, a line of eight hundred cavalry militia from Aconcagua under the command of the colonel José Maria Portus. These militia were badly equipped, of poor quality, and were only deployed during the final phases of the battle.

Eschewing further reconnaissance, O'Higgins ordered his men forward in a determined attack against the larger enemy force, apparently optimistic following the early preliminary victory delivered by Freire along the bank. After an unfruitful cannonade, O' Higgins attacked in force at 16:00, placing his infantry in the centre of his line, supported by four guns, and dividing his cavalry between both flanks. After one hour of fruitless attack, and having received numerous losses without causing much damage to the defenders, O'Higgins' forces began to retreat in relative disorder. This moment was seized by the cavalry of Luis Carrera, who ordered Diego Jose Benavente to encircle the enemy's right flank and begin to further disrupt his line. This was followed by the mounted militia of Aconcagua charging the middle of O'Higgins' line, breaking through it and taking numerous prisoners, amongst them four senior officers.

O'Higgins' men fled, mainly to the south, attempting to cross the Maipo river and seeking safety in the buildings around Chena. O'Higgins' own mount had collapsed wounded, and he retreated from the field on a borrowed horse, leading a unit of 100 men to safety. Meanwhile, the bulk of the 3rd division of Carrera's force, under the command of José Miguel Carrera himself, had been positioned on the suburbs of Santiago at the beginning the battle. Despite a force march, it did not arrive in time to take part in the main action. When the cavalry from the 3rd division arrived, it joined the units chasing O'Higgins' men from the battlefield – but as the sun set around 18:30, Carrera's men gave up the pursuit.

== Consequences of the battle ==
Luis Carrera did not pursue his enemies any further that night, keeping to his position. He placed some forces as a diversion towards the Hacienda de Tango, accompanied by the guns he had seized from O'Higgins. Whilst these guns provided a desultory bombardment, Carrera's main body left Perez's farm and retreated two kilometers to the north, to the hamlet of Ochagavia.

On the next day, O'Higgins finally regrouped to the south of the Maipo and reunited his men, with the intention of joining them with his rear units and undertaking a fresh attack. In the midst of this, news came from Talcahuano of the arrival of the royalist expedition of General Mariano Osorio, advancing quickly towards them. This intervention encouraged both sides to settle their differences and to jointly defend their country.

O'Higgins sent a representative to José Miguel Carrera to convey the news of the situation and his intentions. After some further negotiations, the two leaders settled their differences at the Hacienda de Tango, jointly signing a declaration in Santiago on 4 September. On the following day O'Higgins left the capital to assume the leadership of the 1st division, consisting of his old forces, under the overall command of José Miguel Carrera. These forces would conduct the defence of Chile, leading up to the disaster of the battle of Rancagua.
