= Paula Jaraquemada =

Chilean patriot

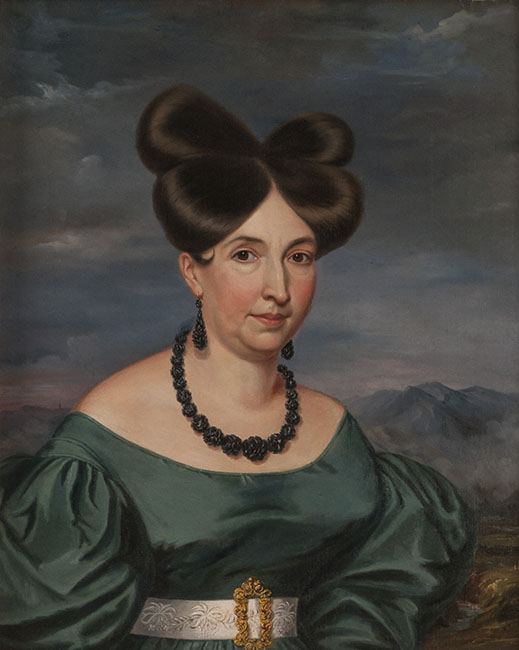
Paula Jaraquemada

Paula Jaraquemada Alquizar (1768–1851) was one of Chile's most outstanding patriots in the struggle for independence from Spain.

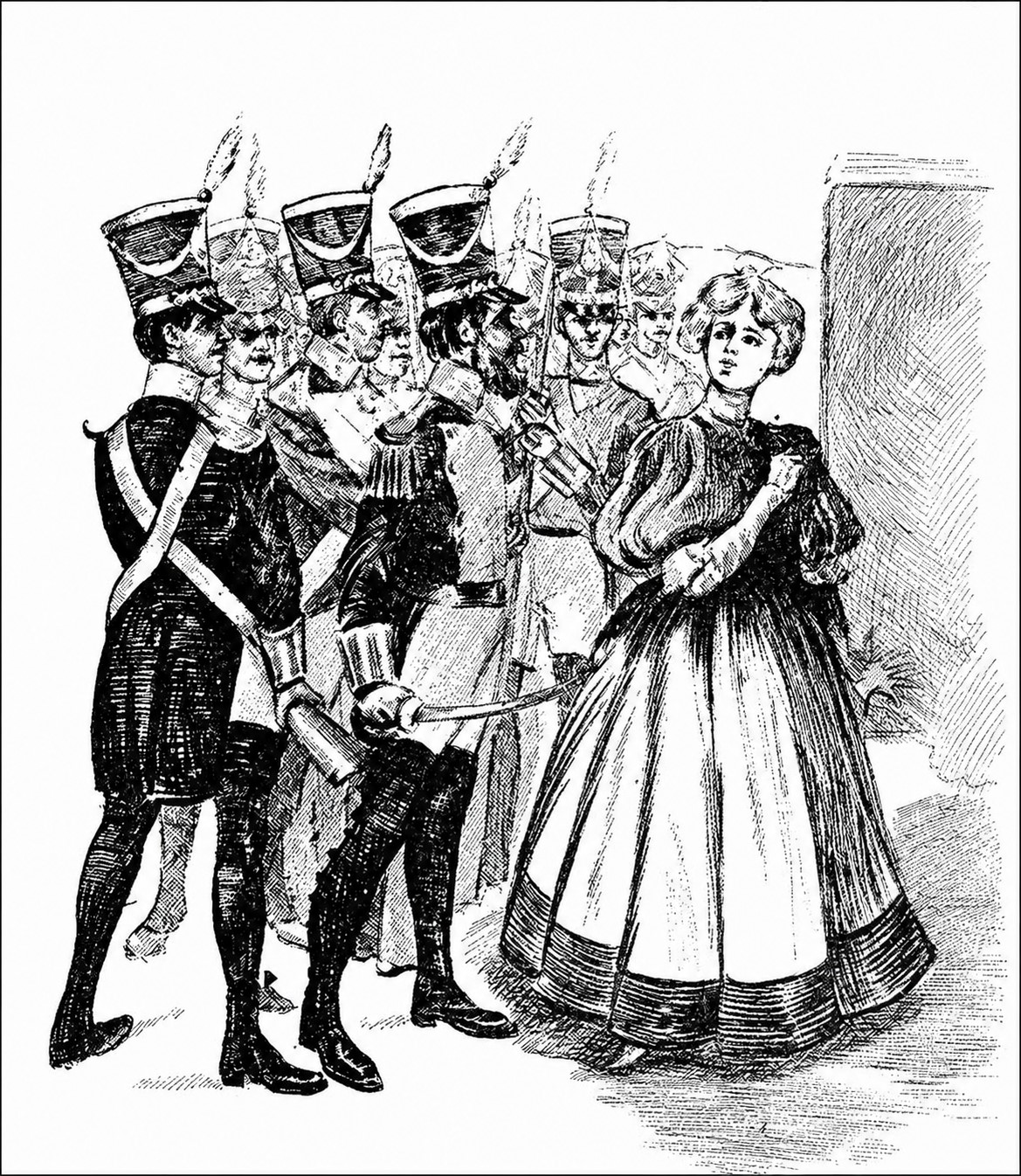
Illustration showing Jaraquemada facing royalist soldiers.

== Biography ==
Born in Santiago on 18 June 1768, Jaraquemada was the daughter of Domingo de Jaraquemada and Cecilia de Alguizar. She was a relative to the Carrera Family.

At the end of the Independence of Chile, Paula who was 50 years old received the Patriot Army in her hacienda in Paine (Maipo). She gave refuge to them after the defeat in the Battle of Cancha Rayada, on 19 March 1818 physically protecting them from the Spaniards.

She provided the accoutrements and to revitalize the troops, she facilitated horses and ordered her servants to be part of this army. Her greatest achievement was to deal with a Spanish captain, who arrived to her hacienda to stock on supplies for his troops. The captain demanded the keys to her storehouse, but she denied stating "I will never give you the keys. Nobody, except me, gives the commands in this house". The officer ignored her reply and once again gave the order for the keys. Paula did not give up in the argument and risking her life she took one of the bayonet from a soldier and put it in her chest. She stated, that she preferred to die instead of accepting the order.

Jaraquemada is seen as a symbol of a Chilean woman standing up to authority like Inés Suárez and Javiera Carrera. She is still mentioned as a role model to contemporary protestors against mistreatment.

== Life after Independence ==
In the last years of her life, Paula Jaraquemada dedicated herself to charitable works, visiting orphans and the homeless. In the women's correctional house in Santiago, she achieved important improvements for the detainees.

== Homage ==
- In El Bosque a kindergarten and a street were named after her.
- In Santiago, there is a hospital called "Hospital San Borja Arriarán" which was initially called "Hospital Paula Jaraquemada".
- Many schools are named after her, some of them are located in Quilicura, Paine, Recoleta, Iquique and Peñalolen.
