= Guñelve =

Mapuche symbol

The Guñelve

The Guñelve (Mapudungun: Wünelfe / Wüṉyelfe, lit. 'bringer of dawn'), sometimes known as the Star of Arauco, is a symbol from Mapuche iconography which can be described as an octagram (or a star with eight points) in saltire.

It represents the planet Venus, but has also erroneously been thought to represent the canelo tree, which is considered sacred among the Mapuches.

The guñelve was the inspiration of Bernardo O'Higgins to create the current flag of Chile.

Flag possibly used by Mapuche troops in the 18th century, used by some Mapuche groups today

Reproduction of the original design of the flag used in the proclamation of independence

Reproduction of the original flag design, without the coat of arms, used as the government flag from 1826 to 1910

Current design of the Chilean flag

In recent times the guñelve has been used by some designers in Chile, such as during the 2015 Copa América in Chile, when it was used as the symbol of the cup.

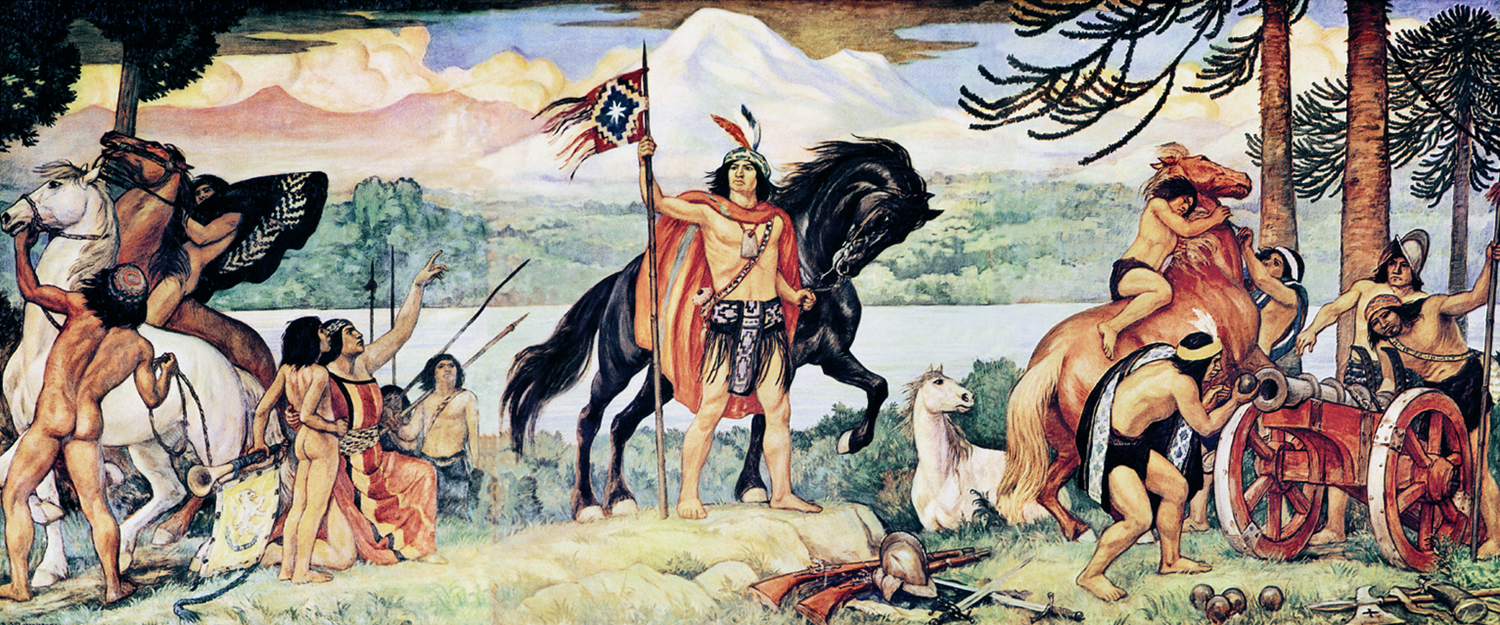
The Painting El joven Lautaro with Guñelve flag.

== See also ==
- Flag of Chile
- Flag of the Mapuches
