= Federico Santa María =

Chilean businessman and philanthropist

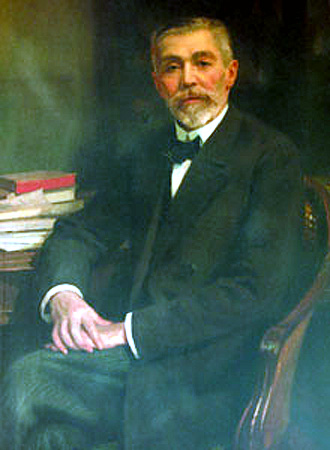
- Born: Federico Santa María Carrera; 15 August 1845; Valparaíso, Chile
- Died: 20 December 1925 (aged 80); Paris, France
- Occupations: Businessperson; philanthropist
- Known for: Founding Federico Santa María Technical University
- Partner: Anna Guillaud
- Parents: Juan Antonio Santa María Artigas (father); Magdalena Carrera Aguirre (mother)
- Relatives: Juan Antonio Santa María Carrera (brother); Juan José Pedro Carrera (great–grandfather); Ana María Cotapos (great–grandmother)
- Family: Santa María family Carrera family

Federico Santa María Carrera (1845–1925) was a Chilean businessperson and philanthropist who founded the Federico Santa María Technical University. He was a member of the Santa María and Carrera family.

== Early life ==
Federico Santa María Carrera was born on 15 August 1845 in Valparaíso to Juan Antonio Santa María Artigas and Magdalena Carrera Aguirre. Through his mother, Santa María was of Basque descent and was the great-grandson of Juan José Pedro Carrera, a soldier in the Chilean War of Independence, and independence campaigner Ana María Cotapos.

== Career ==
Santa María accumulated wealth in the sugar markets of Paris, where he moved at a young age. During World War I, he suspended his business operations, stating that he did not wish to profit from the conflict. During this period, he supported the French Army by donating supplies for a regiment.

In 1922, Santa María resumed sugar trading. Following a predicted deficit in sugar production, his investments resulted in significant financial gains. These activities were investigated by the French National Assembly, which determined that he had acted within legal bounds.

== Personal life ==
Santa María did not marry but lived for several decades with Anna Guillaud. He was a distant relative of the Chilean pianist Claudio Arrau.

Having no descendants, Santa María bequeathed his fortune to his hometown of Valparaíso for the establishment of a technical and engineering school, which became the Federico Santa María Technical University.
