= Juan José Pedro Carrera =

Chilean politician (1782–1818)

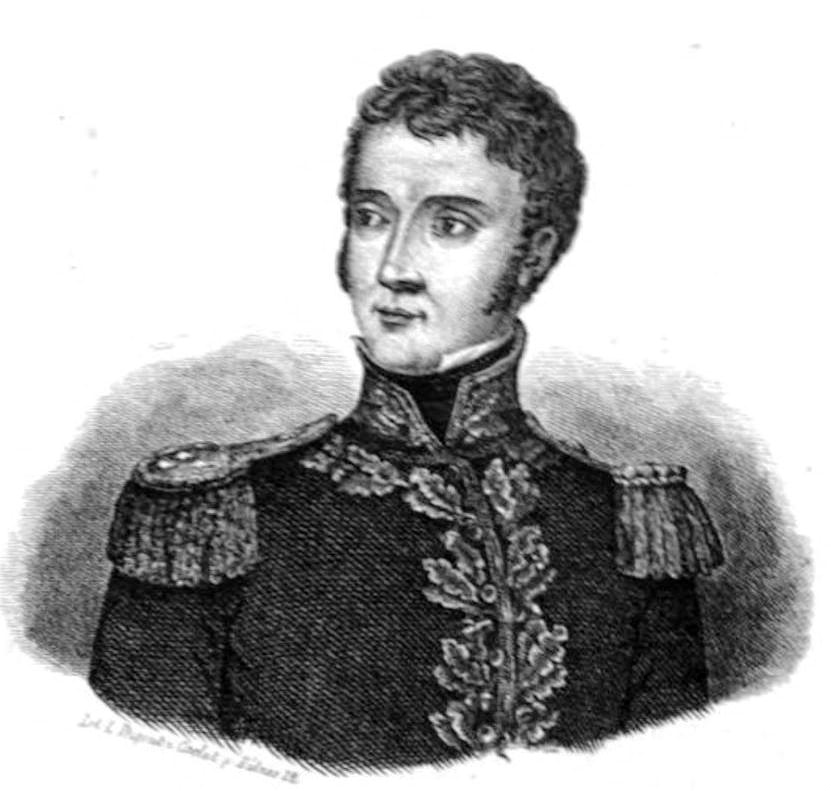
Juan José Carrera, according to lithography of 1857.

Juan José Pedro de la Carrera y Verdugo or Juan José Pedro Carrera (Santiago, Captaincy General of Chile, 26 June 1782—Mendoza, United Provinces of the Río de la Plata, 8 April 1818) was a Chilean soldier and patriot who actively participated in the first phase of the Chilean War of Independence, a stage known as the Patria Vieja (Old Homeland). In support for his brother José Miguel Carrera, and together with his younger brother Luis and other Republican officers, he formed one of the main factions within the supporters of Independence: the Carrerino group. He was shot to death in Mendoza together with his brother Luis, at the hands of the city authorities.

== Public life ==
In March 1813, during José Miguel's absence, he was appointed member of the Board of Governors.

In 1813, with the rank of brigadier, he participated in some of the first military actions of the Independence; such as the Siege of Chillán and the Battle of San Carlos.

In the fall of 1814 he remained exiled in Mendoza, by order of the Supreme Director Francisco de la Lastra. During said exile he earned the dislike of the local governor, José de San Martín.

Back in Chile, he participated in a new coup, on 23 July, which overthrew De la Lastra and briefly reinstated José Miguel in supreme command. At the end of September of the same year, 1814, he assumed command of the Second Division of the patriot army, which was ready to block the passage over the Cachapoal River to the forces of the royalist Mariano Osorio, which was heading to take the capital. Faced with this desperate situation, and on the eve of assuming such an uncertain commission, he married Ana María Cotapos.

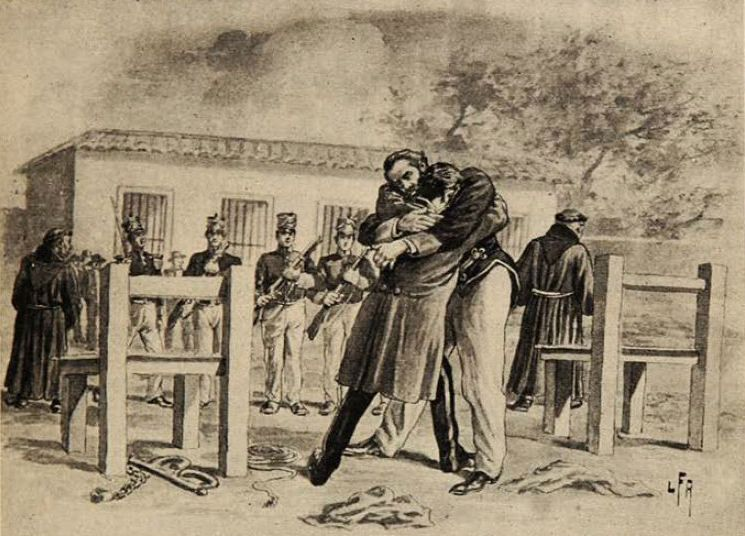
the brothers Carrea, before being executed

A few days later, the Patriots were decively defeated in the Battle of Rancagua (2 October 1814). After the battle, the Spanish captured Santiago within a few days, which marked the beginning of the Reconquista of Chile. Like many Patriots, the Carrera brothers fled to Argentina to escape the violence the Spanish had unleashed upon the rebels.

They lived in exile in Mendoza, Argentina, and there, he and his brother Luis participated in the so-called "conspiracy of 1817" against O'Higgins, directed by his sister Javiera Carrera. The conspiracy was discovered in August 1817, and the brothers were imprisoned. Ultimately, they were both executed on 8 April 1818.
