= Battle of El Roble =

1813 battle of the Chilean War of Independence

Coordinates: 36.7563°S 72.4134°W

- Part of the Chilean War of Independence
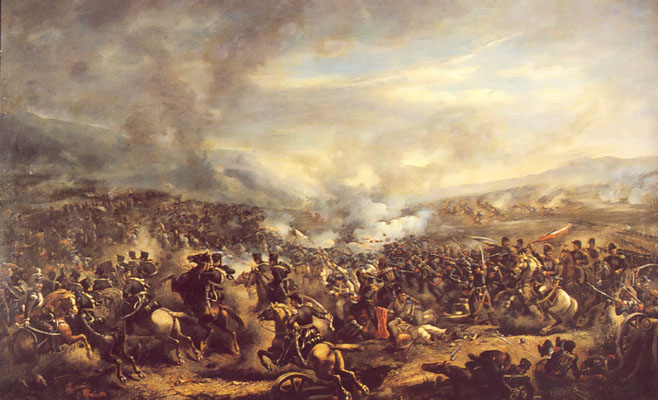
- The Battle of El Roble by Manuel Tapia
Date	October 17, 1813
Location	El Roble, on the Itala river
Result	Patriot victory

Belligerents
Chilean patriots	(Spain) Royalists

Commanders and leaders
José Miguel Carrera; Bernardo O'Higgins (WIA)	(Spain) Clemente Lantaño (Spain) Luis Urrejola

Strength
800 men 5 guns	1,200 men

Casualties and losses
30 killed	80 killed

The Battle of El Roble was fought on the Itata river, 17 October 1813, between the Chilean patriot general José Miguel Carrera and Spanish royalist forces under the command of Clemente Lantaño and Luis Urrejola. The surprise patriot victory at El Roble as a result of Bernardo O'Higgins' actions at the end of the day was to result in a change of patriot commander, and a severe split within the patriot movement.

== Background ==
General José Miguel Carrera planned to seize the city of Chillán from royalist hands, and had divided his army into two parts. One part, under the command of his brother Juan Jose was sent two kilometres beyond the confluence of the Itata and Ñuble rivers. The other part, under Carrera's own command, went three leagues further east to cross at the paso el Roble.

Having discovered Carrera's plans, Juan Francisco Sanchez, the royalist commander in Chillán, decided to destroy the patriot army in a surprise attack. He ordered his officers to send a force across the Itata river at night, moving it into position on the south bank of the river, to the east of the patriot forces. To the north, the royalist placed a force of 400 men under the control of Juan Antonio Olate, with the task of preventing the patriots from crossing the river.

== The battle ==
At dawn on the 17 October, the royalist forces launched their surprise attack on Carrera's forces, creating panic in their ranks. Carrera, believing his army defeated, drove his horse into the Itata river and retreated from the battle to avoid capture. Meanwhile, then Colonel Bernardo O'Higgins had kept his composure from the start of the shooting and, gathering about two hundred men around him, ran to protect the artillery and organise the resistance. He was joined by captains Joaquín Prieto and Diego José Benavente forming a respectable little force. After about an hour or more of fighting, O'Higgins became impatient. Taking a gun from a fallen soldier and brandishing it, he shouted:

"Lads! To me! Live with honour, or die with glory! The one who is brave is the one who follows me!"

The troops, encouraged by the example of O'Higgins, charged forward with him and drove the enemy into rapid retreat. Although injured in the leg, O'Higgins continued to lead the pursuit of the enemy on foot, until the royalists had crossed back over the river in total confusion.

== The aftermath ==
The royalists left more than 80 dead in the battlefield, whilst the patriots had suffered thirty casualties. The greatest impact, however, was off the battle field. For the patriot army, this was their first victory against the royalist forces, which would be well remembered. For José Miguel Carrera, his retreat from the battlefield would cause him to lose support from Santiago, and result in his replacement by Bernardo O'Higgins, leading in turn to the battle of Las Tres Acequias the following year.
