= Old Fatherland =

Period of Chilean history (1810–1814)

Kingdom of Chile Reino de Chile Patria Vieja
- 1810–1814
- Flag Emblem
- Motto: Post tenebras lux (Latin) "Light After Darkness"
- Territories of the Captaincy General of Chile
- Capital: Santiago de Chile
- Government: Provisional government
- King
  - 1810–1814: Ferdinand VII (de jure)
- President
  - 1810–1811: Mateo de Toro y Zambrano
  - 1811–1813: José Miguel Carrera
  - 1813–1814: José Miguel Infante
- Legislature: National Congress
- Historical era: Decolonization of the Americas
  - Established: 18 September 1810
  - First National Congress: 4 July 1811
  - Coup d'état: 4 September 1811
  - Provisional Constitution: 3 May 1814
  - Disestablished: 2 October 1814

Population
  - Estimate: 823,685 (1813 Census)
Preceded by	Succeeded by
Captaincy General of Chile	Reconquest (Chile)
- Today part of: Chile

Old Fatherland (Spanish: [ˈpatɾja ˈβjexa], lit. 'Patria Vieja') refers to a time period in the history of Chile occurring between the First Junta of the Government (September 18, 1810) and the Disaster of Rancagua (October 1, 1814). In this period, Chilean measures were taken for the imprisonment of Fernando VII of Spain by Napoleon and this started the governmental organization of the Kingdom of Chile, which swore fidelity to Ferdinand VII.

This period was characterized by the transformation from a movement of temporary autonomy to one of total independence. Two things that stood out during this period were the political prominence of the Carrera brothers, especially José Miguel Carrera and the military campaigns led by Bernardo O'Higgins as General. (Battle of Membrillar, Battle of Yerbas Buenas, and Battle of El Roble).

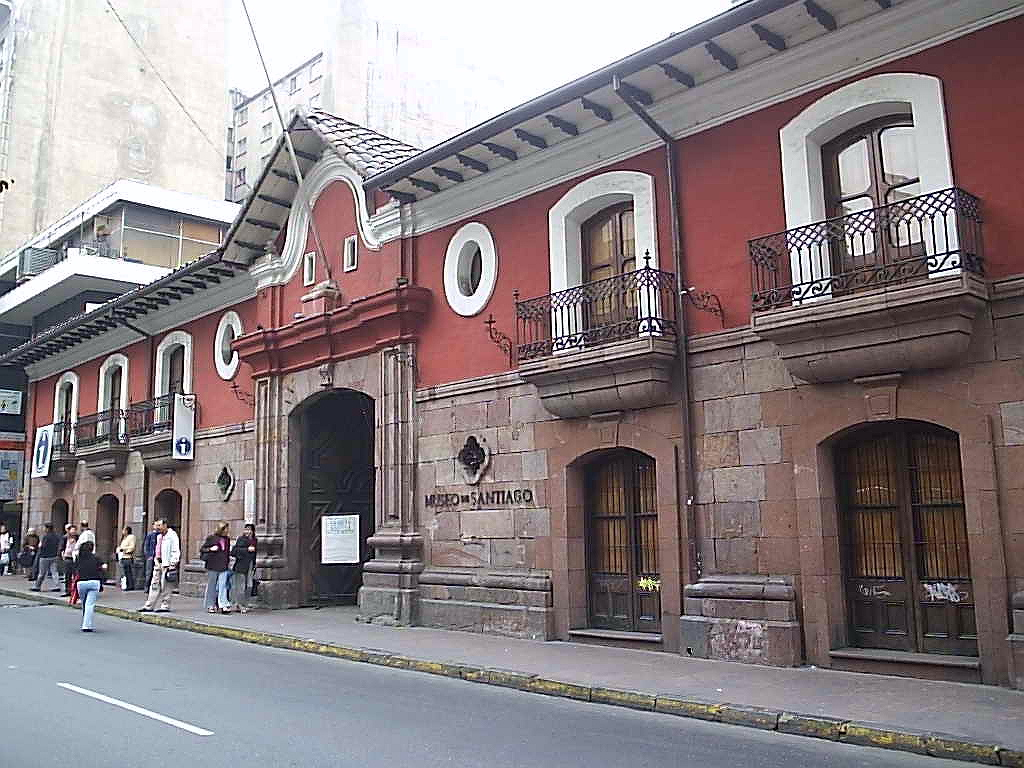
La Casa Colorada, residence of Governor Mateo de Toro y Zambrano (Currently the Museo de Santiago)

A map of Chile, in the colors of its original flag, with borders claimed at the time it declared independence

== Government ==
During this time a Government Junta of Chile as well as a National Congress were organized to administer the country during the imprisonment of the king. The Congress passed a law decreeing Liberty of the Womb, which stated that all children of slaves born on Chilean soil from that point onwards would be free. In 1812, the first constitutional decree was passed, which agreed to recognize the king if he accepted certain constitutional regulations.

== Legacy ==
Artefacts relating to the military campaigns of the Patria Vieja can be seen at the Chilean Historical and Military Museum.
