= Luis Carrera =

Chilean military officer (1791–1818)

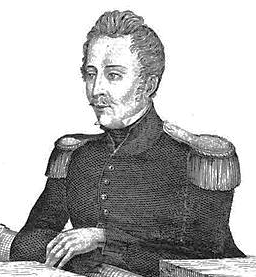

Personal details
- Born: b. 1791 Santiago, Viceroyalty of Peru
- Died: April 8, 1818 Mendoza, Argentina

Military service
- Battles/wars: Chilean War of Independence; Battle of Yerbas Buenas; Siege of Chillán; Battle of Las Tres Acequias; Battle of Rancagua

Colonel Luis Florentino Juan Manuel Silvestre de los Dolores de la Carrera y Verdugo (1791 – April 8, 1818) was a Chilean military officer who fought in the Chilean War of Independence. Together with his brothers José Miguel and Juan José, they were some of most important leaders of Chilean struggle for independence during the period of the Patria Vieja ("Old Republic"). The Carrera family is of Basque origin.

== Life ==
Luis Carrera was born in Santiago, the youngest son of Ignacio de la Carrera y Cuevas and of Francisca de Paula Verdugo Fernández de Valdivieso y Herrera. Carrera completed his first studies at the Convictorio Carolino, the best school in the country at the time. In 1813 – at the beginning of the Chilean War of Independence – he participated in the first encounter between the Patriot and Royalist troops at the Battle of Yerbas Buenas, as a commander of an artillery platoon. That same year he also participated in the disastrous Siege of Chillán, one of the most negative early experiences for the nascent Chilean Army, where after a long siege of the Spanish troops that were barricaded inside the city, the army had to withdraw in the midst of winter that same year. He also fought in the defense of Talca.

After the Spanish reconquista, the Carrera brothers were exiled to Argentina but continued campaigning from exile. On November 21, 1814 he killed Brigadier Juan Mackenna, one of the strongest supporters of General Bernardo O'Higgins, in a duel in the city of Buenos Aires. He was arrested and tried but later freed. Eventually, Luis was taken prisoner and executed in the city of Mendoza together with his brother Juan José by the military of the United Provinces of the Río de la Plata in 1818. the Carreras opted for a project to integrate Chile as part of a "Southern Federation," a project possibly influenced by the Carreras' relationship with U.S. federalism. His and his brother supporters were known under the name of "Carreristas".

== See also ==
- History of Chile
- Carrera family
- Juan Mackenna

== Bibliography ==
- Barros Arana, Diego (1855). Historia Jeneral de la Independencia de Chile (in Spanish). Vol. I–IV. Santiago, Chile: Imprenta del Ferrocarril.
- Gay, Claudio (1856). Historia de la Independencia Chilena (in Spanish). Vol. I & II. Paris, France: Imprenta de E. Thunot y Cia.
- Vicuña Mackenna, Benjamín (1857). El Ostracismo de los Carreras (in Spanish). Santiago, Chile: Imprenta del Ferrocarril. p. 553.
- Zapiola, José (1872–1876). Recuerdos de treinta años (1810–1840) (in Spanish). Vol. I & II. Santiago, Chile: Imprenta de El Independiente. p. 310.
- "Genealogical chart of Carrera family" (in Spanish). Archived from the original on March 6, 2005.
