= Nicolasa Valdés =

First Lady of Chile (1733–1810)

First Lady of Chile
- In role July 16, 1810 – September 18, 1810
- President: Mateo de Toro Zambrano
- Succeeded by: Mercedes Fontecilla

Personal details
- Born: María Nicolasa de Valdés y de la Carrera; January 7, 1733
- Died: December 18, 1810 (aged 77) Santiago, Captaincy General of Chile
- Spouse: Mateo de Toro Zambrano
- Children: 10
- Parent(s): Domingo de Valdés y González de Soberal; Ana Francisca de Borja de la Carrera y Ureta

María Nicolasa de Valdés y de la Carrera, Countess of La Conquista (January 7, 1733 – December 18, 1810) was the inaugural First Lady of Chile from September 18, 1810, when her husband assumed the presidency in Chile's First Government Junta, until her death four months later.

Nicolasa Valdés was of Basque descent, born in Santiago, the second daughter of Domingo de Valdés y González de Soberal and of Ana Francisca de Borja de la Carrera y Ureta. She married Mateo de Toro Zambrano, 1st Count of la Conquista on May 3, 1751, and together they had ten children. She died in Santiago, shortly before her husband, at the age of 77.

== Notes ==
- Medina, José Toribio (1906). Diccionario Biográfico Colonial de Chile (PDF) (in Spanish). Santiago, Chile: Imprenta Elziviriana. pp. 869–870.
- Pilleux Cepeda, Mauricio. "Recopilación de Genealogia Chilena" (in Spanish).

Honorary titles
Preceded by Position Established	First Lady of Chile; 1810	Succeeded by Mercedes Fontecilla
