= Battle of San Carlos (May 1813) =

Coordinates: 36°26′59″S 71°59′37″W

The battle of San Carlos
- Part of the Chilean War of Independence
Date	15 May 1813
Location	San Carlos near Chillán, Chile
Result	Patriot victory

Belligerents
Chilean patriots	(Spain) Royalists

Commanders and leaders
José Miguel Carrera	(Spain) Juan Francisco Sánchez

Strength
4,036	6,000

Casualties and losses
100 killed	70 killed

The battle of San Carlos occurred on 15 May 1813, during the War of Chilean Independence.

== Background ==
In May 1813, the Royalist forces, under the command of Juan Francisco Sánchez were retreating to their stronghold of Chillán. The Royalist army's situation during the retreat was desperate; their baggage train had advanced significantly ahead of the main force to avoid being attacked, and the rearguard were almost without supplies. In these circumstances, the patriot commander, Jose Miguel Carrera could potentially have just avoided battle by instead advancing along the left bank of the Ñuble river and have occupied Chillán without a fight. Instead he chose to intercept the Royalist army directly on the outskirts of San Carlos, Chile.

== The battle ==
Carrera placed his infantry in the centre of his force, using his cavalry to flank the enemy positions, avoiding the Royalist artillery. Unfortunately, the patriot infantry appear to have been ordered to mount a sudden bayonet charge; they received a full volley from the Royalist guns, broke formation and fled from the field. Unsupported, the cavalry attacks also dispersed. Juan Mackenna brought up a fresh division later in the day, but could not make much impact on the Royalist infantry. By nightfall, the patriots had dispersed completely, and on the following morning neither Carrera nor Mackenna had any units left to continue the attack.

== Aftermath ==
Carrera's failure to achieve a decisive victory at San Carlos, Chile resulted in the Siege of Chillan later that year; the siege, held in mid-winter, was a disaster both for the patriots and for Carrera personally, ultimately leading to his dismissal from office.
