= Carrera family =

Influential family in Chilean history and politics

Carrera family Familia Carrera
- Aristocratic and political family
- Arms of the Carrera family
- Country: Chile, Peru
- Origin: Alegia, Basque Country
- Founded: 1620
- Founder: Juan Ignacio de la Carrera Yturgoyen

The Carrera family is a Chilean aristocratic and political family of Basque descent. Becoming politically influential during the colonial period, the Carrera family played a significant role in the Chilean independence and remained politically important throughout the 19th century.

== Main branch ==
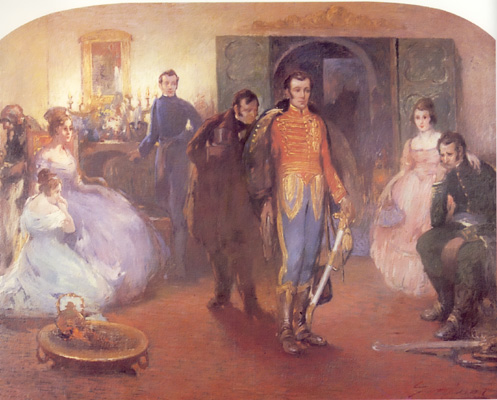
'Familia de los Carrera' by Arturo Gordon Vargas

- Juan Ignacio de la Carrera Yturgoyen (1620–1682) soldier, politician, governor and founder of the Carrera family in Chile; married Catalina de Elguea y Cáceres, the great-great-granddaughter of Diego García de Cáceres
  - Francisco Juan de la Carrera y Elguea (1656–) soldier and politician; married Isabel de los Reyes Cassaus
  - José Miguel de la Carrera y Elguea (1674–1720) soldier and politician; married Francisca Josefa Ureta Prado
    - Ignacio de la Carrera y Ureta (1703–1760) soldier and politician; married Francisca Javiera de las Cuevas y Valenzuela
      - Ignacio de la Carrera y de las Cuevas (1747–1819) soldier, politician and member of the First Government Junta of Chile; married Francisca de Paula Verdugo
        - Javiera Carrera (1781–1862) Chilean independence activist known for sewing the first national flag of Chile; first marriage to Manuel José de la Lastra; second marriage to Pedro Díaz de Valdés (1761–1826)
          - Santos Díaz de Valdés Carrera (1803–1869) politician; married María Dolores Valdivieso Cruzat
          - Ignacio Díaz de Valdés y Carrera (1808–1864) soldier; married Rosario Videla Ledesma
        - Juan José Pedro Carrera (1782–1818) soldier and hero of the Chilean Independence; married Ana María Cotapos (1797–1833), Chilean Independence campaigner.
        - José Miguel Carrera (1785–1821) soldier, politician and hero of the Chilean independence; married Mercedes Fontecilla
          - Rosa Carrera Fontecilla (1818–1862); married Ambrosio Aldunate Carvajal (1794–1844) politician
            - Luis Aldunate Carrera (1842–1908) lawyer and politician
          - José Miguel Carrera Fontecilla (1821–1860) politician and soldier; married Emilia Pinto Benavente (1824–1895)
            - Ignacio Carrera Pinto (1848– 1882) soldier and hero of the War of the Pacific, depicted on the thousand peso banknote
            - Manuel Carrera Pinto (1853–1895) politician and Freemason
        - Francisca Javiera Carrera Fontecilla (1816–1886); married Francisco Javier Valdés Aldunate (1790–1881)
          - José Miguel Valdés Carrera (1837–1898) Liberal Party politician and farmer; married Emilia La Jara Alliendeallier
        - Luis Carrera (1791–1818) soldier and hero of the Chilean independence
      - Juan José Carrera Cuevas (1756–1785) soldier
    - Ana Francisca de Borja de la Carrera Ureta (1712–1767): married Domingo Valdés González de Soberal (1695–1767)
      - María Nicolasa de Valdés y de la Carrera (1733–1810) inaugural First Lady of Chile; married Mateo de Toro Zambrano y Ureta, 1st Count of La Conquista (1727–1811), Royal Governor of Chile and inaugural President of the Government Junta
        - Gregorio José de Toro, 2nd Count of La Conquista (1758–1816) soldier and Royalist during the Chilean War of Independence
          - Manuel María de Toro, 3rd Count of La Conquista (1798–1818) soldier and Royalist during the Chilean War of Independence
    - Damiana de la Carrera Cuevas (1748–1834); married Francisco de Borja de Aráoz
      - Dolores Aráoz Carrera (1780–); married Manuel Antonio Figueroa Polo (1774–1817) soldier, politician, civil servant and son of Tomás de Figueroa y Caravaca
        - Francisco de Paula Figueroa Araos (1828– 1882) farmer and politician; married Rosalía Larraín Echeverría
          - Javier Ángel Figueroa (1862–1945) lawyer and politician; married Inés Arrieta Cañas
          - Emiliano Figueroa Larraín (1866–1931) lawyer, politician and President of Chile; married Leonor Sánchez Vicuña
          - Joaquín Figueroa Larraín (1863–1929) lawyer and politician; married Elena Amunátegui Valdés
      - Manuel Antonio Araoz Carrera (1789–1857) politician; married Mercedes Baeza de la Cuadra

== Other notable members ==
- Juan Antonio Santa María Carrera (1848–1925), lawyer and Radical Party politician; married Adela Martínez Díaz; great-grandson of Juan José Carrera Cuevas (1756–1785).
- Federico Santa María Carrera (1845–1925) businessperson, philanthropist and founder of Federico Santa María Technical University; partner of Anna Guillaud; great-grandson of Juan José Carrera Cuevas (1756–1785)
- Benjamin Gonzalez Carrera (1921–2012) director of the Corporation for the Defense of Sovereignty and the José Miguel Carrera Historical Research Institute; great-great-grandson of José Miguel Carrera (1785–1821)
- María Elena Carrera Villavicencio (1929–2026), Pediatrician, doctor and Socialist Party politician; great-great-granddaughter of José Miguel Carrera (1785–1821)

== See also ==
- History of Chile
