= Diego José Benavente =

Chilean politician

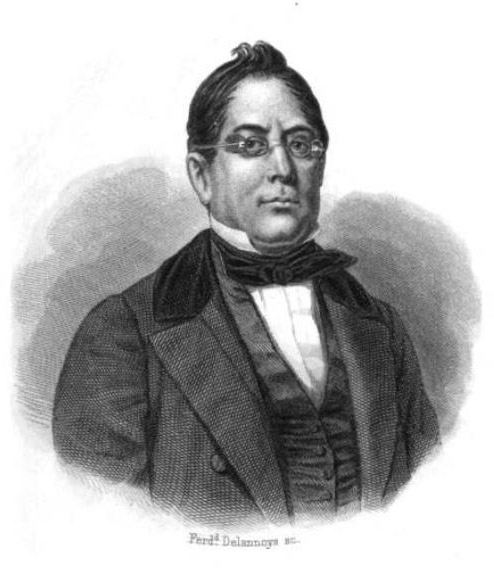

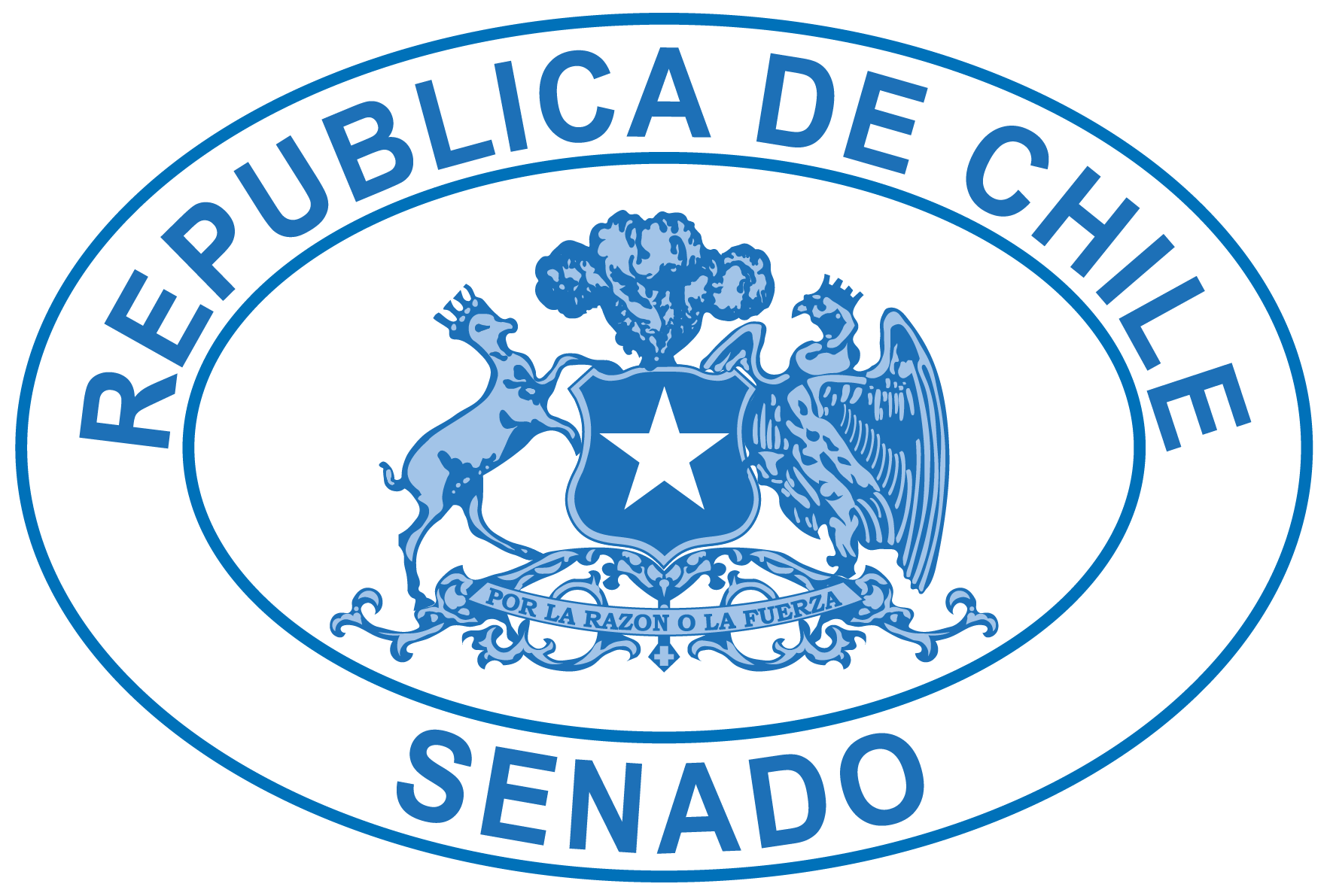
President of the Senate of the Republic of Chile
- In office 5 June 1834 – 8 October 1834
- Succeeded by: Diego Elizondo Prado
- In office 4 September 1844 – 4 June 1847
- In office 3 June 1861 – 9 July 1862
- In office 6 August 1849 – 9 July 1858

Personal details
- Born: 1 January 1790 Santiago, Viceroyalty of Peru
- Died: 21 June 1867 (aged 77) Santiago, Chile
- Party: Conservative Party
- Occupation: Politician

Diego José Benavente Bustamante (born 1790–21 June 1867) was a Chilean politician who served as President of the Senate of Chile.
