= José Miguel Carrera =

Chilean military officer; independence leader (1785–1821)

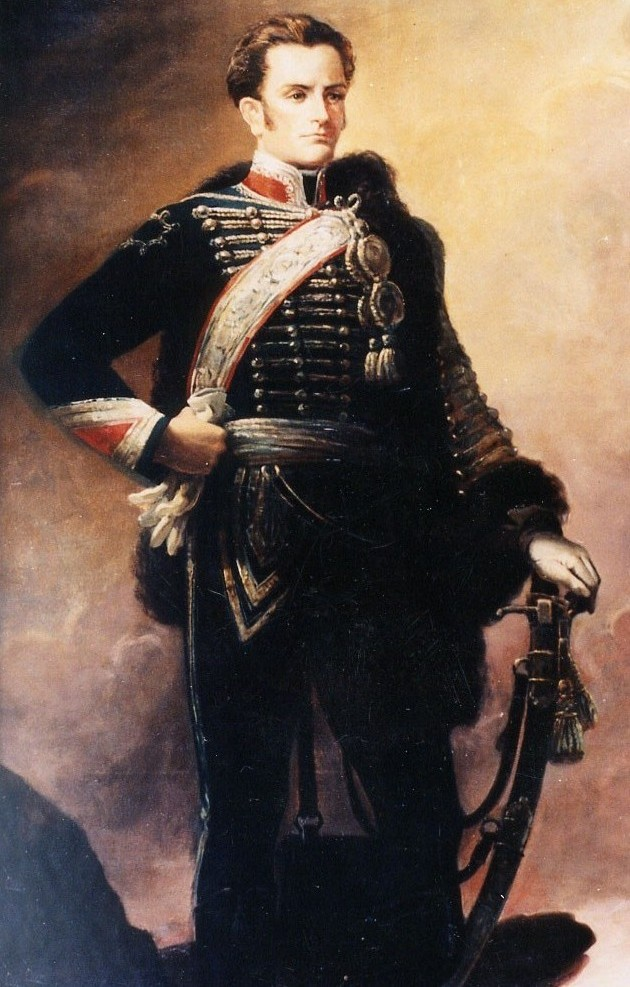

President of the First Chilean Governing Council
- In office November 16, 1811 – October 2, 1814

Personal details
- Born: October 15, 1785 Santiago, Chile
- Died: September 4, 1821 (aged 35) Mendoza, Argentina
- Party: Independent (Affiliated with the Federalist Party)
- Spouse: Mercedes Fontecilla

Military service
- Battles/wars: Peninsular War; Battle of Los Yébenes; Battle of Talavera; Battle of Ocaña; Chilean War of Independence; Battle of Yerbas Buenas; Battle of San Carlos; Siege of Chillán; Battle of El Roble; Argentine Civil Wars; Battle of Cepeda; Battle of Cañada de la Cruz; Battle of Chajan; Battle of Las Pulgas; Battle of Río Cuarto

José Miguel Carrera Verdugo (Latin American Spanish: [xoˈse miˈɣel kaˈreɾa]; October 15, 1785 – September 4, 1821) was a Chilean general, formerly Spanish military, member of the prominent Carrera family, and considered one of the founders of independent Chile. Carrera was the most important leader of the Chilean War of Independence during the period of the Patria Vieja ("Old Republic"). After the Spanish "Reconquista de Chile" ("Reconquest"), he continued campaigning from exile after defeat. His opposition to the leaders of independent Argentina and Chile, San Martín and O'Higgins respectively, made him live in exile in Montevideo. From Montevideo Carrera traveled to Argentina where he joined the struggle against the unitarians. Carreras' small army was eventually left isolated in the Province of Buenos Aires from the other federalist forces. In this difficult situation Carrera decided to cross to native-controlled lands all the way to Chile to once and for all overthrow Chilean Supreme Director O'Higgins. His passage to Chile, which was his ultimate goal, was opposed by Argentine politicians and he engaged together with indigenous tribes, among them the Ranquel, in a campaign against the southern provinces of Argentina. After the downfall of Carrera's ally, the Republic of Entre Ríos, and several victories against the United Provinces of the Río de la Plata, Carrera's men were finally defeated by numerically superior forces near Mendoza. Carrera was then betrayed by one of his Argentine helpers, leading to his capture and execution in that city.

== Early years ==
José Miguel Carrera was of Basque descent. He was born in Santiago, the second son (third child, after his sister Javiera and his brother Juan José) of Ignacio de la Carrera y Cuevas and Francisca de Paula Verdugo Fernández de Valdivieso y Herrera. Carrera carried out his first studies in the Convictorio Carolino, the best school in the country at the time. During these years, he became friends with Manuel Rodríguez, a classmate and neighbour, future guerrilla leader of the Chilean independence movement.

After school he was sent to Spain by his parents. There he joined the Spanish Army in 1808. He fought against the Napoleonic forces, obtaining the rank of Sergeant Major and receiving the command of the Húsares de Galicia regiment.

In Spain he also made contact with the United States independence movement and joined the Cádiz Order.

== La Patria Vieja ("Old Republic") (1810–1814) ==
When he learned about the Junta de Gobierno that had been established in Chile to rule during the absence of the Spanish monarch, he went back to Chile and got involved in politics. As the Carreras were one of the three major political forces, he became part of the government. On 15 November 1811 the Carreras made a coup d'état and José Miguel became the sole ruler of Chile (his brothers were military commanders). Because of his more personal and Chilean-national point of view about Chilean independence, Carrera came into conflict with the Lautaro Lodge, whose more Latin-Americanist centered objective was to unite all Latin America in the same way as the United States of America.

During his government, he helped create several Chilean national symbols and institutions: Carrera created the first Chilean Constitution, made the first Chilean flag and coat of arms, and promoted the press by bringing the first printing press to Chile, which directly led to the appearance of the first newspaper in Chile: La Aurora de Chile. Carrera also established September 18 as the national day of Independence (which is still celebrated in Chile), even though the real independence date is on February 12 of 1818. He also abolished slavery, rescinded the clergy's right to legal immunity, and founded the first state-sponsored school in Chile, the Instituto Nacional.

As the Spanish Army and Navy invaded the South of Chile, he became Commander in Chief of the patriotic forces and left the government. He had a successful campaign, expelling the Spaniards from the city of Concepción.

After the Surprise of El Roble, in which Carrera was surrounded and had to jump into a river to save himself (not without first shooting straight at the enemy's head of commander), the government relieved him of his duties and appointed Brigadier Bernardo O'Higgins, who had managed to repel the enemy incursion. Carrera was taken prisoner by the Spaniards but managed to escape, he finally exchanged prisoner after the Gainza treaty, and went on to overthrow the government for the third time.

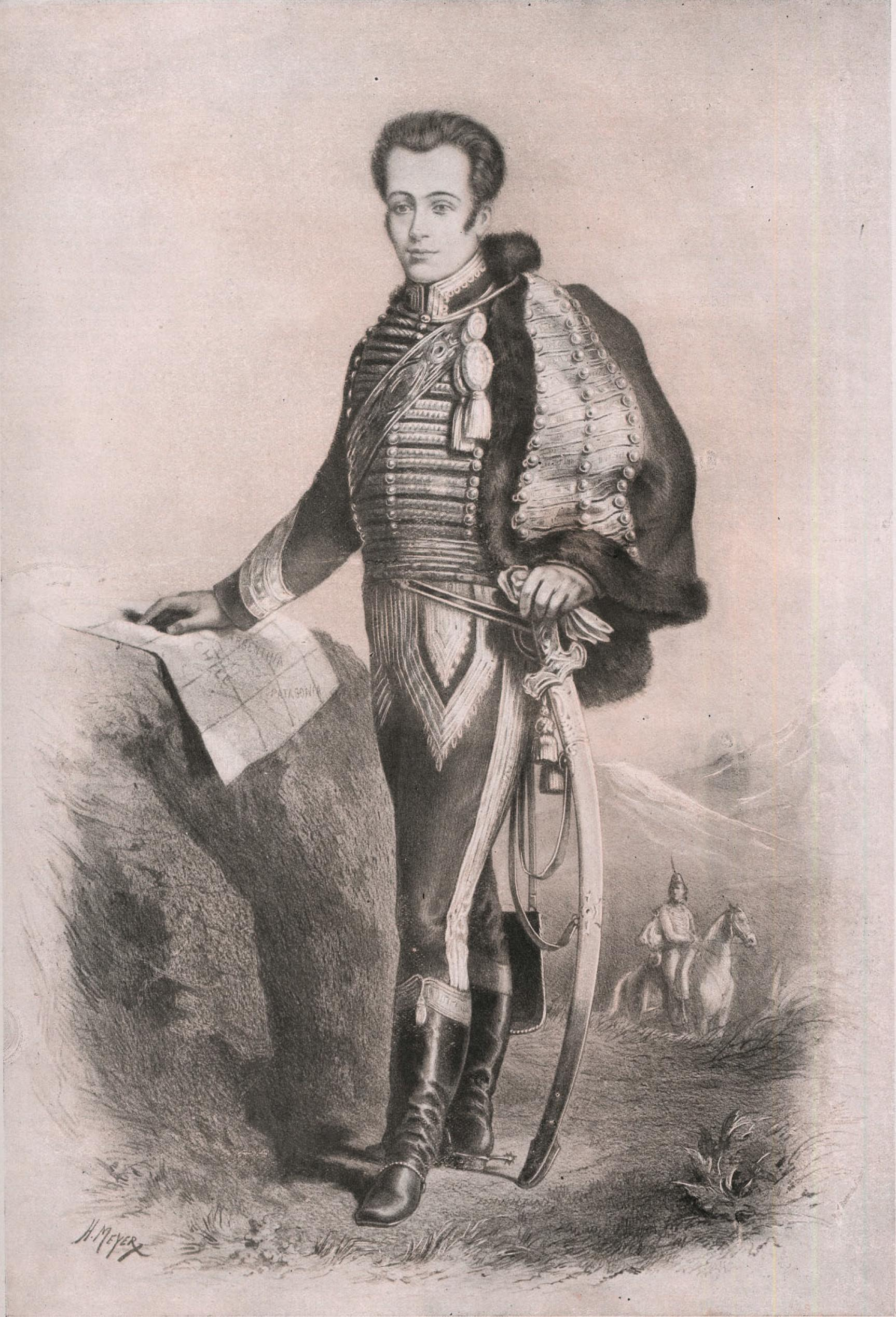
General José Miguel Carrera

Bernardo O'Higgins did not acknowledge Carrera and fought against the Carrera's army at the Battle of Tres Acequias (Carrera's youngest brother, Luis Carrera, defeated O'Higgins using a cunning defensive strategy). During this chaos, the Spanish army retook Concepción and advanced towards Santiago. Carrera and O'Higgins decided to re-unite the army; Carrera's plan was to draw the Spaniards to the Angostura del Paine, while O'Higgins wanted to make his stand at the town of Rancagua. It was settled to make it at the Angostura de Paine, a gorge that formed an easily defended bottleneck, which seemed to be the most logical plan considering that the local forces were outnumbered. However, at the last hour and against direct orders, O'Higgins garrisoned the Chilean forces at the main square of Rancagua. He and his forces were promptly surrounded, and after an entire day of fighting, the Spanish commander Mariano Osorio was victorious in the Disaster of Rancagua, (1–2 October 1814).

== Argentina and the United States ==
With the defeat of the Chilean forces, many patriots escaped to Mendoza, which was governed at the time by José de San Martín. As San Martín was a member of the Lautaro Lodge, he welcomed O'Higgins and his allies. After committing acts of vandalism José Miguel and his brothers were arrested and sent to Buenos Aires, where Carlos María de Alvear, a friend of Carrera since the war against Napoleon in Spain, had just been proclaimed national hero. Alvear would shortly go on to take power in Argentina.

While Alvear was in government, Carrera was in a good position in Buenos Aires. But after Alvear was overthrown, power was taken by members of the Lautaro Lodge, forcing Carrera to leave Buenos Aires for the United States. With the help of Commodore David Porter, and by sheer force of personality, José Miguel Carrera managed to obtain—on credit—four ships with American crews for the Chilean independence enterprise.

However, as he arrived in Buenos Aires with this fleet, the pro-San Martin Argentine government confiscated the ships and put Carrera in prison. During his imprisonment, San Martín organized an army in Mendoza. This group crossed the Andes and defeated the Spaniards in the Battle of Chacabuco, on 12 February 1817.

Carrera received help from the United States' envoy who came with him, Joel Roberts Poinsett, and was able to escape from San Martin's forces, taking refuge in Montevideo under the protection of Brazilian General Carlos Frederico Lecor. While in Montevideo, his brothers Juan José and Luís plotted against O'Higgins, because of his having betrayed the Carreras to San Martin and the Lautaro Lodge. They were arrested in Mendoza and executed by the command of Bernardo de Monteagudo, after the Royalists defeated San Martin and O'Higgins at the Second Battle of Cancha Rayada. The Lautaro Lodge had already made plans that, in case of defeat, all political enemies—including the Carrera brothers—would be executed. After José Miguel was informed of this, he openly and vociferously began opposing both San Martin and O'Higgins.

Subsequently, Jose Miguel Carrera was one of the main promoters of the Argentine federalist war and fought against the Unitarian government. Carrera and the federalist forces defeated the Directorship government and entered Buenos Aires. On 23 February 1820, they signed the Treaty of Pilar, the document that first established the Argentine federal system. However, because of national rivalries, Carrera is not often recognised in Argentine Historiography.

As a result of this treaty, Carrera received money and troops, with which he marched towards Chile. One of Carrera's main ally before his death was the Boroanos tribe that had recently migrated from Araucanía to the Pampas. However, he was intercepted in Mendoza and taken prisoner.

== Trial and execution ==
After being judged by his enemies on a show trial,, Carrera was executed by a firing squad on 4 September 1821.

== Warrior ==
Carrera entered the military career, in Chile, as a mere boy at the age of six. At the age of 22 (1808) he entered the Napoleonic Wars participating in the campaigns of 1808, 1809, and 1810. In Europe Carrera became an elite cavalry officer and a captain in the hussar regiment Húsares de Farnesio. He also became commander of the Húsares de Galicia. He distinguished himself in the Battle of Talavera and was awarded the Cruz of Talavera. He was wounded in the Battle of Ocana. In total he participated in some 20 armed engagements and battles on European soil.

On his return to Chile he led his men in some 10 battles and/or armed engagements against the Spanish Army. Later, following his trip to the US, and in his attempt to return to Chile, from Argentina, he and his men fought the Argentine in a series or armed confrontations and battles some of which were particularly cruel and bloody. Notable in his Argentine campaign was the Battle of Rio Cuarto. In all, Carrera participated in combat in some 40 separate occasions.

== Legacy ==
Carrera is today considered one of the Chileans Padres de la Patria (Fathers of the Nation). The conflict between followers of O'Higgins and Carrera continues to some extent to this day, when many declare themselves Carreristas or O'Higginistas. Carreristas claim that his figure is not given enough recognition, in comparison with O'Higgins, whom they openly despise.

Apart from ending slavery in Chile, Carrera abolished the titled nobility and ended their legal prerogatives and privileges. He also founded the first free newspaper in the nation, La Aurora de Chile; instituted the first national flag and national seal; and founded the first free secular school, which eventually became known as the Instituto Nacional, its full name being Instituto Nacional General José Miguel Carrera; several Chilean presidents and dozens of senators and parliamentarians have graduated from its halls.

In the Patagonian region in the south of Chile, there is the General Carrera Lake.

All five of Carrera's legitimate offspring married prominently in Chilean society, and their descendants, who number in the few hundred, make up the bulk of the Chilean upper classes.

His prominent descendants include:

- Ignacio Carrera Pinto, his grandson, a hero who died during the Battle of La Concepción, in the War of the Pacific.
- Federico Santa María, industrialist and millionaire, who gave his money to build Federico Santa María Technical University, one of the best technical and engineering schools in Chile.

== In popular culture ==
The life of José Miguel Carrera is shown through the television project Heroes. The series include 6 related movies about Chilean Founding Fathers and Heroes, and in it, José Miguel Carrera was portrayed by Diego Casanueva.

== See also ==
- Anti-Chilean sentiment
- History of Chile
- Government Junta of Chile (November 1811)
- Aurora de Chile
- Carrera family
- Manuel Rodríguez
- September 1811 Chilean coup d'etat

Political offices
Preceded by None	Member of Government Junta; 1811	Succeeded by None
Preceded by Juan Martínez de Rozas	President of Government Junta; 1811	Succeeded by José Santiago Portales
Preceded by José Santiago Portales	President of Government Junta; 1812	Succeeded by Pedro José Prado
Preceded by Pedro José Prado	President of Government Junta; 1812–1813	Succeeded by Francisco Antonio Pérez
Preceded by Francisco de la Lastra	President of Government Junta; 1814	Succeeded by Bernardo O'Higgins
Military offices
Preceded by Title created	Army Commander-in-chief; 1813	Succeeded by Bernardo O'Higgins
Preceded by Bernardo O'Higgins	Army Commander-in-chief; 1814	Succeeded by José de San Martín
