= Battle of Yerbas Buenas =

1813 battle of the Chilean War of Independence

- Part of Chilean War of Independence
Date	April 27, 1813
Location	Yerbas Buenas
Result	Royalist victory

Belligerents
Chilean patriots	(Spain) Royalists

Commanders and leaders
Juan de Dios Puga	(Spain) Antonio Pareja

The Battle of Yerbas Buenas took place during the Chilean War of Independence in April 1813. The first action in that war that was more than a skirmish, it resulted in a victory for the Royalists. It is also known as the Surprise of Yerbas Buenas.

In the battle, the Chilean forces, under the command of Colonel Juan de Dios Puga, and the Spanish forces, under the command of Brigadier Antonio Pareja, confronted each other.

The battle began when, in the middle of the night, the Chileans let loose on the Spanish soldiers that were camping in the village of Yerbas Buenas, near Linares. In the beginning, the dark favored the Chileans, who created confusion among the Spanish troops and almost won the battle but just at the light of day, the Spanish realized that they were greater in number than the Chileans, and launched an attack. A third of the Chilean patriots were killed; among these were Lieutenant Enrique Ross and Colonel Juan de Dios Puga.

With great difficulty, the survivors, directed by Captain Santiago Bueras, managed to escape the Spanish attack and reach the base in Talca to inform General Carrera that the Spanish forces were nearing them.
