= Battle of Rancagua =

1814 battle of the Chilean War of Independence

- Part of the Chilean War of Independence
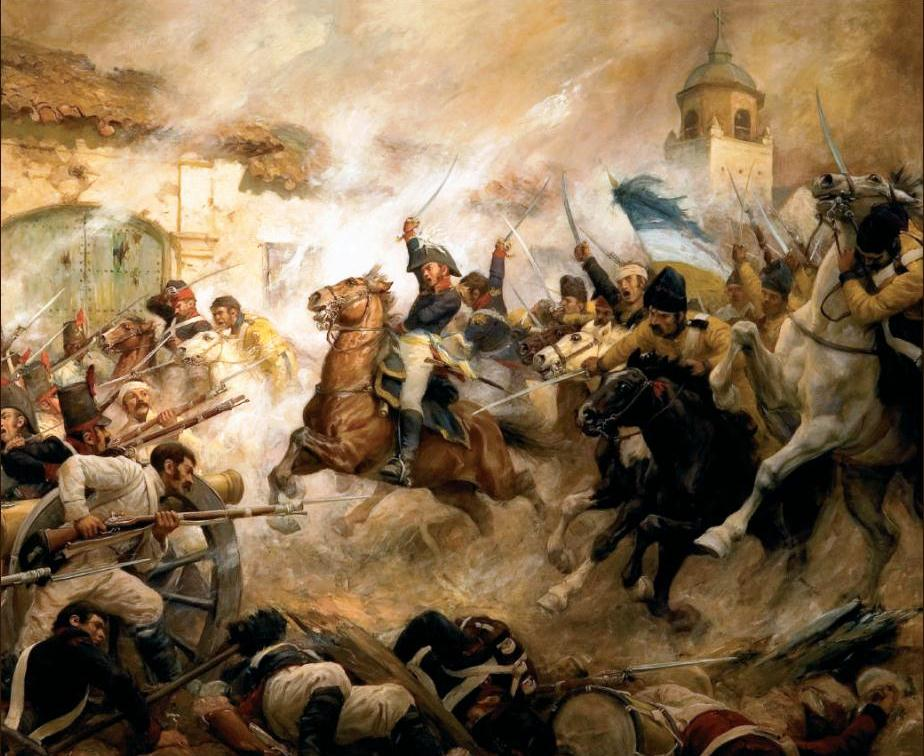
- O'Higgins' Charge at the Battle of Rancagua; Pedro Subercaseaux, 1938
Date	October 1–2, 1814
Location	Rancagua, Chile
Result	Royalist victory

Belligerents
Royalists	Chilean patriots

Commanders and leaders
Mariano Osorio	Bernardo O'Higgins

Strength
5,000	4,000

Casualties and losses
111 killed 127 wounded	402 killed 292 wounded 600 captured

The Battle of Rancagua, also known in Chile as the Disaster of Rancagua, occurred on October 1, 1814, to October 2, 1814, when the Spanish Army under the command of Mariano Osorio defeated the Chilean forces led by Bernardo O’Higgins. This put an end to the Chilean Patria Vieja and it was the decisive step of the Spanish military Reconquest of Chile.

== Background ==
After the signing of the British-brokered Treaty of Lircay, which established a comprehensive truce between the patriot government of Chile and the Cortes de Cádiz through the royalist Viceroyalty of Perú, some factions within the pro-independence movement perceived this diplomatic approach to Spain as treason. On 25 July 1814, the radicals overthrew Supreme Director Francisco de la Lastra and appointed Jose Miguel Carrera as the head of a provisional junta. When the Viceroy of Peru, José Fernando de Abascal, heard about the revolt in Chile, he sent an expedition of Spanish soldiers and royalists to defeat the rebellion. O'Higgins, whose position towards the revolt was unclear, heard about the besieged troops in Rancagua and went with his army of 1,000 patriots, to reinforce Juan Carrera's forces at Rancagua. Outnumbered and with barely enough supplies, O'Higgins did not retreat and sealed the fate of his army.

== Battle ==
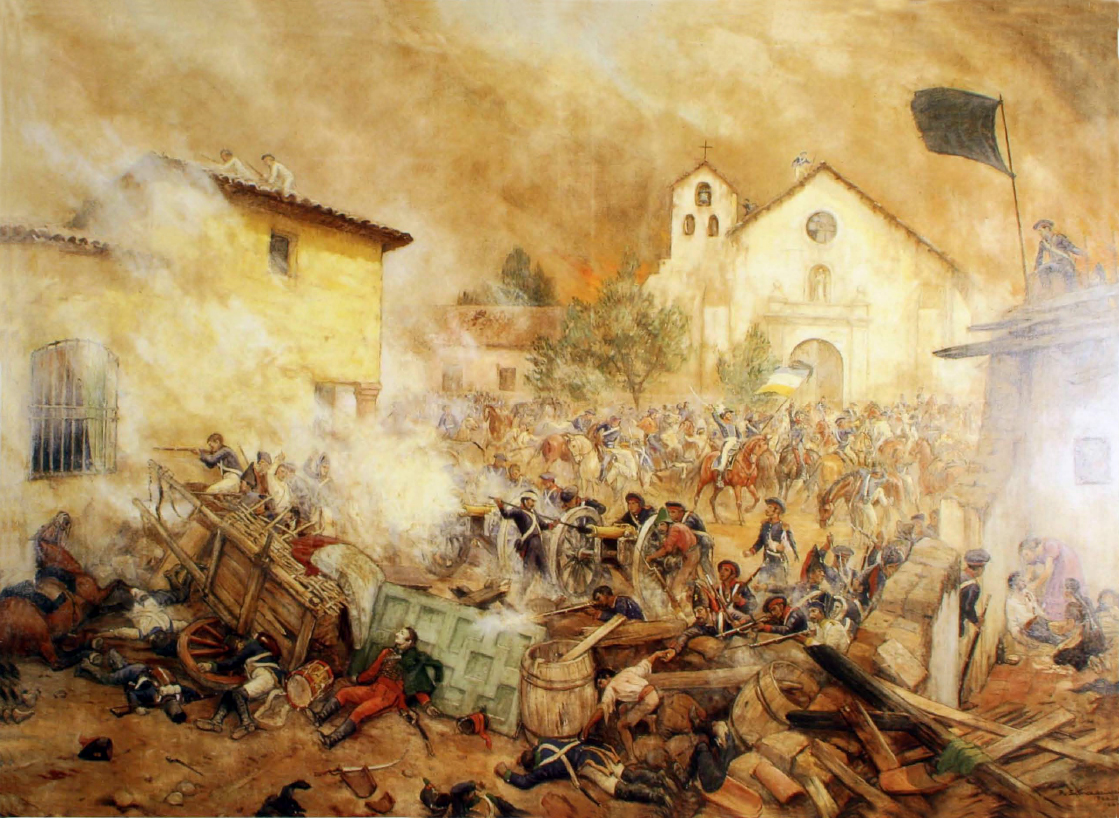
Final moments in Rancagua (Pedro Subercaseaux, 1944)

The battle occurred on the morning of October 1, 1814, outside the town of Rancagua. The Chilean forces had occupied the town prior to this confrontation and ultimately were surrounded by Osorio’s forces who advanced towards the town. The reason for occupying the town was its strategic importance in the defense of the Chilean capital, Santiago. The battle was fierce and the Spanish had an elite force of soldiers known as “Talaveras” who were veterans from the Napoleonic Wars in Europe. As the fighting continued onward to the evening, the Spanish forces decided to set fire to the town. With casualties growing, the Chilean forces requested reinforcements from the capital city of Santiago, which was 87 kilometers north of Rancagua. Ultimately the request failed, which forced the Chilean army to disperse and flee to the countryside and wilderness. After this victory, the Spanish army continued on to Santiago, crushed the Chilean Government and instituted their brutal Reconquista of Chile.

== Aftermath ==
After the Battle of Rancagua, the Spanish captured Santiago within a few days, which marked the beginning of the Reconquista of South America. This battle became a stain on Chile's national memory as it was a time when the nation was lost and the people feared that their struggle for independence was in vain. The people fled elsewhere in South America as refugees to escape the violence the Spanish would have meted out to the rebels.

== See also ==
- Chilean War of Independence
