= Ó hUiginn =

Irish surname

Ó hUiginn is the surname of a Gaelic-Irish family of soldiers, poets, and historians located in Connacht. Originally part of the southern Uí Néill based in the Irish midlands, they moved west into Connacht. They were especially associated with what is now County Sligo, settling at Dooghorne, Achonry and Ballynary, as well as other locations in County Mayo, County Roscommon and County Galway. More than half of those bearing the surname in Ireland today still live in Connacht. The name is commonly anglicised as Higgins or O'Higgins.

People bearing the name include:

- Tadc Ó hUiginn (died 1315), a general master of all arts connected with poetry
- Gilla na Neamh Ó hUiginn (died 1346), poet

Fercert Ó hUiginn (died 1418), head of the family descended from Gilla na Neamh Ó h-Uiginn

Lochlainn, son of Fercert Ó hUiginn (died 1464)

- Doighre Ó hUiginn, scribe of The Book of Magauran
- Donnchad Ó hUiginn, a learned historian (died 1364)
- Maol Sheachluinn na n-Uirsgéal Ó hUiginn (fl. c. 1400), Irish poet
- Niall mac Aed Ó hUiginn (fl. 1414)
- Sean mac Fergail Óicc Ó hUiccinn (died 1490), Irish poet
- Tadg Óg Ó hUiginn (died 1448), chief teacher [of the poets] of Ireland and Scotland
- Elec Ní hUicinn (murdered 1471)
- Brian Ó hUiginn (died 1476), head of his own tribe, superintendent of the schools of Ireland, and preceptor in poetry
- Bishop Ó hUiginn, Bishop of Mayo (died 1478)
- Gilla-Patrick Ó hUiginn (died 1485), son of Brian and grandson of Melaghlin, a man who had kept a general house of hospitality for the mighty and the indigent
- Philip Bocht Ó hUiginn, Irish poet (died 1487)
- Maelmuire son of Tadc Oc O hUiginn (died 1488), a master of poetry
- Sean mac Fergail Óicc Ó hUiccinn (died 1490), Irish poet
- Tadhg Mór Ó hUiginn, poet
- Tadg Óg Ó hUiginn (died 1448), Irish poet
- Tadhg Dall Ó hUiginn (c. 1550-c.1591), Irish poet
- Tadhg Mór Ó hUiginn, Irish poet
- Cairbre mac Brian Ó hUiginn (died 1505)
- Brian Óge Ó hUiginn (died 1505)
- Eogan, son of Brian Óge Ó hUiginn, Chief Preceptor of all Ireland, died 1510
- Gilla-Coluim Ó hUiginn, Irish poet. The son of Maelmuire and Brian Og Ó hUiginn; first cousin of the father of Tadhg Dall Ó hUiginn; died three nights before Lammas (in 1587)
- Conchobhar, son of Enna O'hUiginn, died: a most eminent poet was this Conchobhar; interred at Caisel-na-heilidhi, Machaire-na-nailech (in 1587)
- Tadhg Dall Ó hUiginn, (c. 1550–c. 1591), poet
- Ambrosio O'Higgins, 1st Marquis of Osorno (1720–1801) (Irish: Ambrós Bearnárd Ó hUiginn), Viceroy of Peru for Spain
- Higgins of Tyrawley, 18th century harper
- Bernardo O'Higgins (1788-1842), first head of state of Chile
- Brian O'Higgins (1882–1963), Irish writer and poet
- Kevin O'Higgins (1892–1927), Irish Free State minister, 1922–1927
- Thomas Francis O'Higgins (1916–2003), Irish politician, barrister, a judge
- Michael D. Higgins (born 1941), 9th President of Ireland
- Michéal Ó hUiginn (born 1942), three-time Mayor of Galway

== See also ==
- O'Higgins (disambiguation)
- O'Higgins (surname)
- O'Higgins clan
