= O'Higgins family =

Irish noble family

O'Higgins Ó hUiginn
- Parent house: Southern Uí Néill
- Country: Kingdom of Connacht
- Etymology: Irish
- Titles: Kingdom of Connacht: Lord of Monteige; Lord of Ballynary; Kingdom of Spain: Marqués of Osorno; Barón de Vallenar; Councillor of Castile; Jacobite Peerage: Baronet of Montoge

O'Higgins (Irish: Ó hUiginn) is an Irish noble family. Its Ballynary line is descended from Shean Duff O'Higgins (fl. 1600 C.E.), Gaelic Baron of Ballynary, who was married to a daughter of the royal family of O'Conor at Ballintuber Castle in Connacht. Shean Duff O'Higgins himself claimed descent from King Niall of Tara (died 450 C.E.). Historically, many of their ancestors were poets and scholars who enjoyed the patronage of several chiefly families including O'Conor Don, MacDermott, O'Doherty, O'Gara, and MacDonagh.

O'Higgins are counted among the Gaelic nobility as a sept of the royal house of O'Neill. Members of this family were further ennobled in 1724 by James Francis Edward Stuart (Jacobite pretender to the throne of England and Ireland) during his exile in France. A branch that emigrated to Spanish America was ennobled in the Spanish nobility in 1795 and 1796 by Charles IV of Spain; later members of this branch became prominent in the liberation and politics of republican Chile.

== Family name ==
Earlier scholars traced the origin of the name from the word "knowledge" in Irish, possible linked to the family's early prominence as bards to the Gaelic Kings. However, more recent scholars have identified that "uigin" refers to a Norse seafarer or Viking. During Gaelic times, the prefix "Uí" was employed before a name to indicate lineage from a grandson. This particular family is believed to trace their ancestry back to the grandson of Uiginn, who resided in the 11th century, or potentially to an earlier Uiginn, who was a grandson of King Niall of Tara. In contemporary society, the surname has frequently been anglicized to "Higgins" when translated from Irish to English. However, individuals from the higher-ranking branches of the family still maintain the usage of "O'Higgins."

=== Background ===
The O'Higgins family originated in the Kingdom of Meath and Brega which equate to the modern Irish counties of Meath and Westmeath. As a sept of the Southern Uí Néill their roots in these areas can be traced at least to the 5th century and possibly even earlier. By the 12th century the senior branch of the family had migrated into the Kingdom of Connacht where they settled and were granted large estates by the O'Conors in Sligo at Dooghorne and Monteige in the Barony of Luighne under the protection of the O'Hara Chiefs and at Ballynary in the Barony of Tir-Errill under the protection of the MacDonagh Chiefs.

From the Council of Drom Ceat in 574 AD up to the end of the Gaelic era in the 17th century various members of the O'Higgins clan were hereditary poets (filés in Irish) in the courts of Irish Princes and Chiefs. As hereditary poets they were accorded a status of nobility second in rank only to the King and were entitled to wear the same number of colours in their robes. Members of this family came under the patronage of other Irish noble houses particularly Ó Conor, Ó Neill, MacDonagh, Ó Rourke, Maguire, Ó Doherty, Mac Dermot and Ó Gara. From the 14th to the 17th centuries the O'Higgins were among the most prolific poets in the courts of the Irish Princes.:

=== Loss of status and migration ===
By 1654, the O'Higgins family had all their Irish estates confiscated by Oliver Cromwell due to their refusal to submit to the Parliamentarians. While some members of the family remained in Sligo as tenants on their former lands, others migrated to Spain where they achieved high offices in service to the Spanish Crown. The O'Higgins of Ballynary migrated to Summerhill, County Meath where they lived at Clondoogan and Agher and worked for the Langford family of Summerhill House.

In 1751, one of their number Ambrose O'Higgins left Summerhill for Cádiz, Spain from where he went to Peru and Chile; he eventually Hispanicized his name to Ambrosio. In 1788 he became Royal Governor of Chile. He was ennobled by King Charles IV of Spain initially in 1795 as Barón de Ballinar and again in 1796 when he was raised to Marquess of Osorno. His son, Bernardo O'Higgins was a leader of the Chilean Patriots in the Chilean War of Independence and a leading military officer in the Army of the Andes; Bernardo became the second Supreme Director of Chile in 1817. His son Pedro Demetrio O'Higgins Puga (1818–1868) was an entrepreneur who also served as a politician. Ambrose O'Higgins' brother, William (who Hispanicized his name to Guillermo) served as a captain in the Spanish Army and colonial administrator in Paraguay.

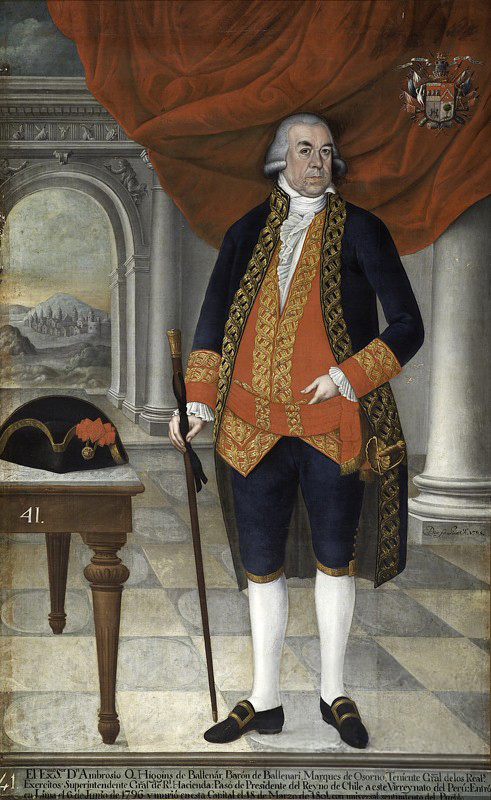
Ambrosio O'Higgins, 1st Marquess of Osorno.

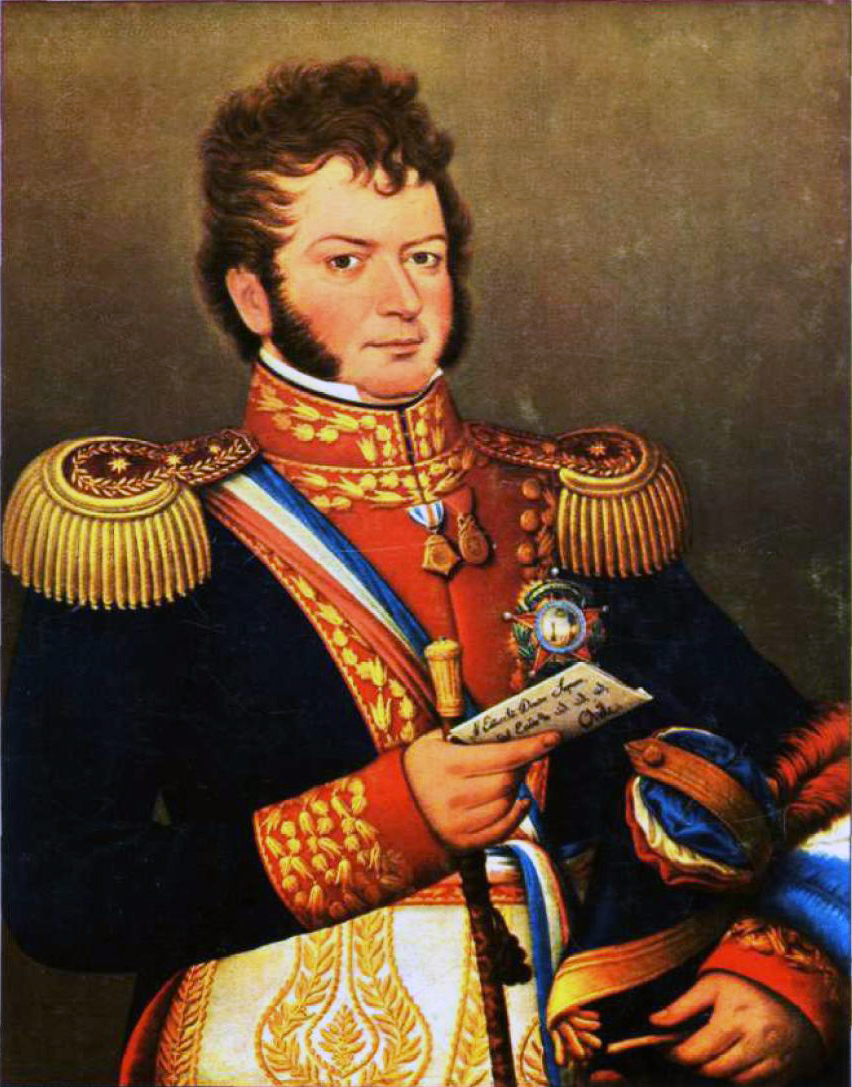
Bernardo O'Higgins (1778-1842), 1st Head of State of Chile.

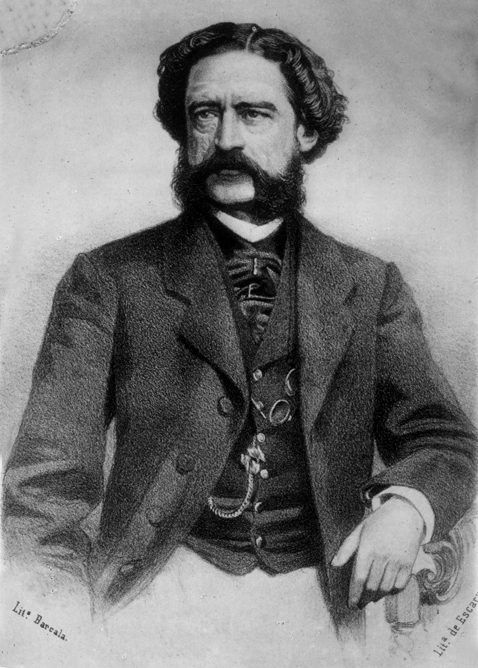
Pedro Demetrio O'Higgins Puga (1818-1868), Chilean Politician and Entrepreneur.

The Ballynary line of the O'Higgins family continued at Summerhill in County Meath until 1947.

Sir John Higgins Bt of Monteige, kinsman to the O'Higgins of Ballynary, was knighted and ennobled by James Francis Edward Stuart in 1724 in return for his services to France. He was senior physician to the King of Spain. His cousin Don Esteban de Iguiño (Stephen Higgins) was a General in the Spanish Colonial Army in the Philippines.

== Notable members of the family ==
- Tadhg Mór Ó hUiginn (died 1315)
- Fercert Ó hUiginn, Irish poet (died 1419).
- Tadhg Óg mac Taidhg mheic Giolla Choluim Ó hUiginn (died 1448)
- Brian Ó hUiginn, Irish poet (died 1476).
- Bernard O'Higgins, Bishop of Elphin, (died 1564)
- Tadhg Dall Ó hUiginn (1550–1591)
- Pól Ó hUiginn (fl. 17th century), also known as Paul Higgins, Roman Catholic deacon and then Vicar-General of Killala diocese before converting to the Established Church.
- Shean Duff O'Higgins (fl. 1600), Baron of Ballynary.
- Sir John Higgins of Montoge (died 1729), Knight, Baronet and Councillor of Castile
- Don Ambrosio O'Higgins (d. 1801), Knight, 1st Barón de Ballinar, 1st Marquess de Osorno.
- Don Bernardo O'Higgins (died 1842), second Supreme Director of Chile
- Petronila Riquelme (1808–1870), daughter of Bernardo O'Higgins, posthumously known as Petronila O'Higgins
- Teachta Brian Ó hUigínn (1882-1963), also known as Brian O’Higgins and Brian na Banban, a founding member of the Irish Volunteers and Sinn Féin, Republican politician and activist, journalist, poet and author.
- Dr. James O'Higgins Norman (born 1968), Irish academic and author at Dublin City University

== Other notable members ==
- Rosa Rodríguez y Riquelme (1781–1850), also known as Rosa O'Higgins, half-sister of Bernardo O'Higgins and executor of his estate.

== Arms ==
The O'Higgins family are armigerous in the Kingdom of Ireland, the Kingdom of Great Britain and Ireland (Jacobite) and in the Kingdom of Spain.

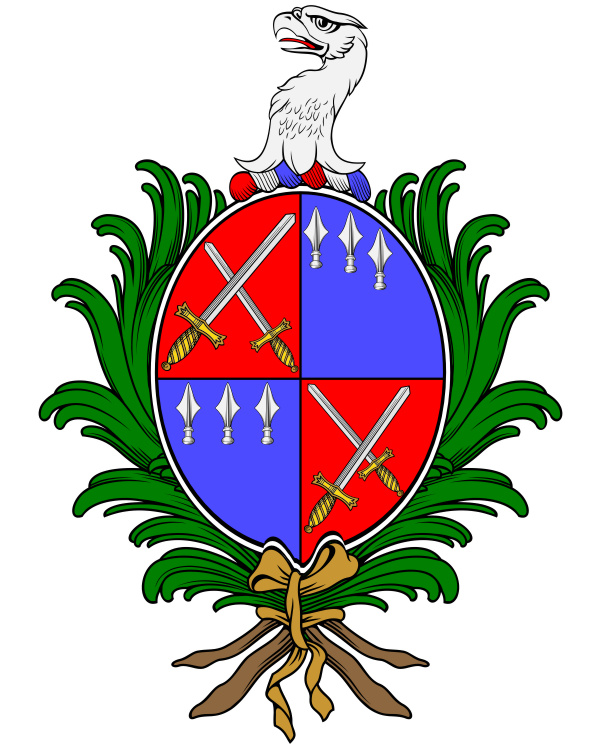
Arms of Sir John Higgins of Montoge Bt,(Athlone Pursuivant of Arms, 1724).

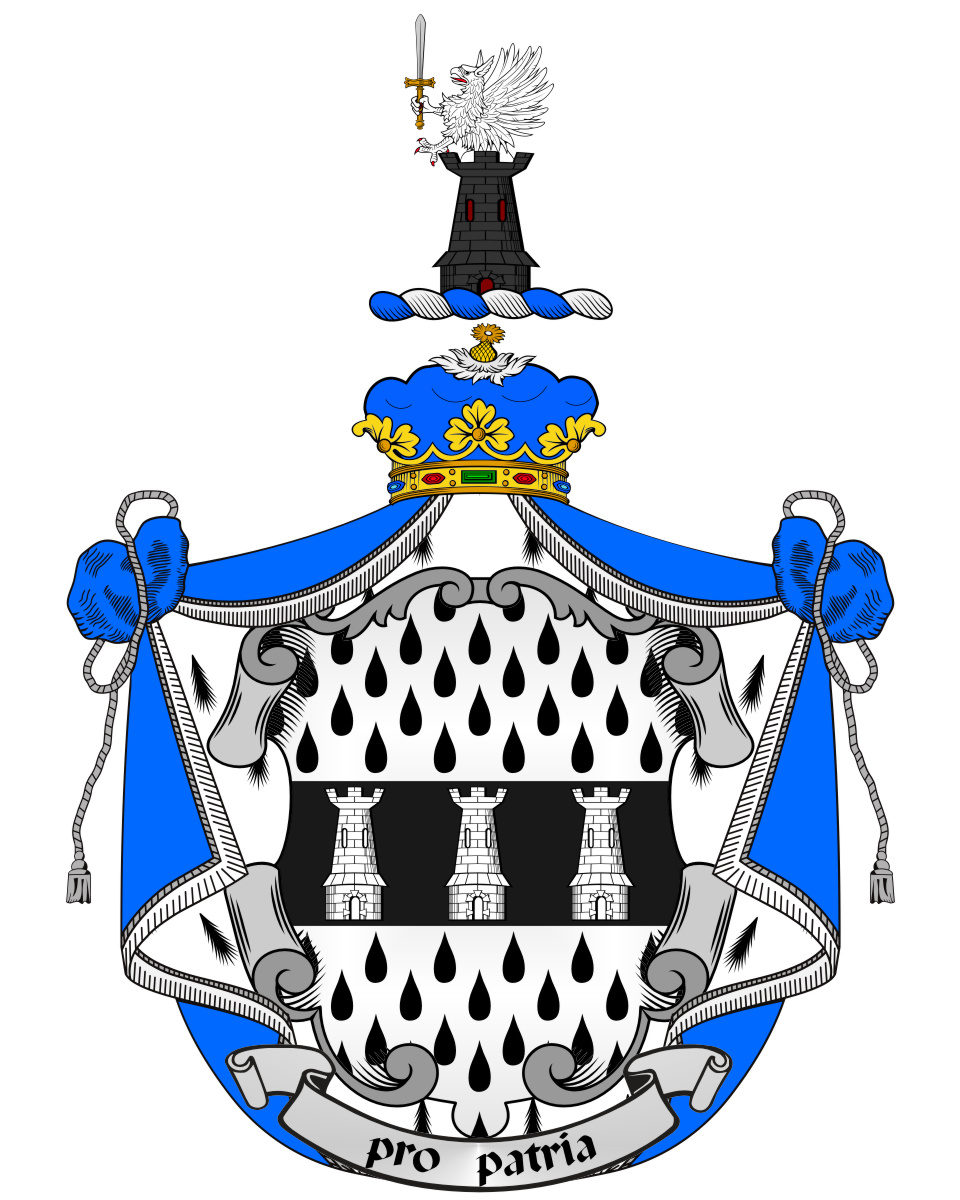
Arms of the O'Higgins of Ballynary (by Ulster King of Arms, 1788; Cronista Rey de Armas, 1795; Cronista de Armas de Castilla y León, 2011)

Arms of Ambrose O'Higgins, 1st Marquis of Osorno (Cronista Rey de Armas de Castilla y León. 1796

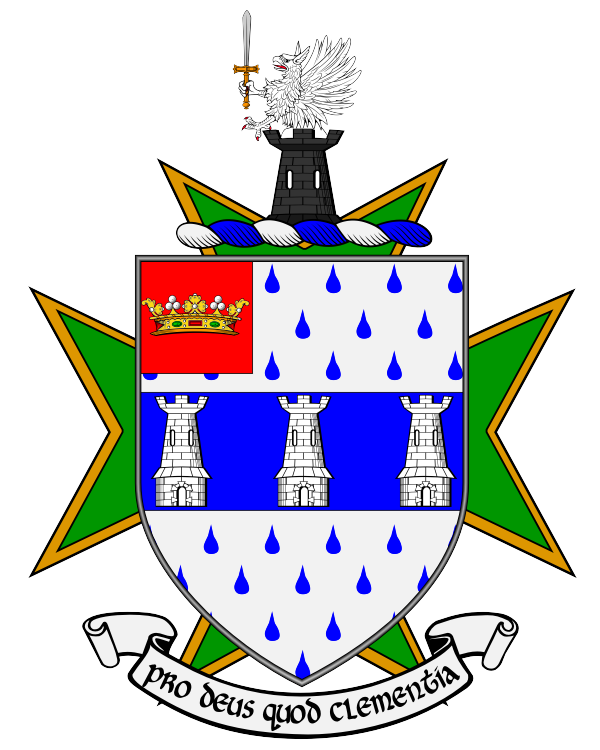
Coat of Arms Dr. James O'Higgins Norman (Cronista Rey de Armas de Castilla y León 2011).

The earliest known coat of arms was recorded in 1724 by Sir John Higgins of Montoge with Sir James Terry, Athlone Herald in the Court of the exiled James II at St. Germain. Sir John Higgins's branch of the family moved to Limerick after they lost their lands at Monteige in Sligo and eventually relocated in France and later in Spain where John Higgins was knighted and became personal physician to the King of Spain.

The descent of the Arms of Shean Duff O'Higgins, Baron of Ballynary were recorded in the Office of Ulster King of Arms in 1788 having existed for at least the previous 200 years. and were later recorded in 2011 with the Cronista Rey de Armas in Madrid eventually descending to Thomas O'Higgins of Cheshire.

In 1788, Don Ambrose O'Higgins obtained a certificate of descent and the right to use the Ballynary Arms with due difference from Ulster King of Arms (Kingdom of Ireland) and subsequently received a grant from the Cronista Rey de Armas (Kingdom of Spain). His Coat of Arms was then adopted in 1796 as the official emblem of the city of Osorno, Chile after which he had been ennobled as Marquis of Osorno.

Dr. James O'Higgins Norman recorded Arms in 2011 with the Cronista Rey de Armas de Castilla y León before being admitted as a Caballero in La Casa Troncal de los Doce Linajes de Soria.

== Fictional references ==
In the episode "The Case of the Guilty Clients" of Perry Mason, the suspect is a South American from Argentina named "O'Higgins," implying that she is a descendant of Don Bernardo O'Higgins—although Bernardo O'Higgins was a resident of Chile.
