= John O'Higgin =

Irish poet

John O'Higgin (Sean Ua h-Uiccinn; modern Irish: Seán mac Fergal Óge Ó hUiginn, died 1490) was an Irish poet.

== Biography ==
A member of the O'Higgin family of historians, scribes, and poets, his obituary in the Annals of the Four Masters describes him as the "Chief Port of Ireland" when he died in 1490.

A son of Farrell Oge, he had known siblings Elec Ní hUicinn (murdered 1471) and Niall mac Fergal Óge Ó hUicinn (died 1461). A manuscript held in Trinity College Library, Dublin (1346 4to, min. chart., a.d. i 726–1750. h. 4. 4.) has a poem by him on page 141, commencing Cia cenncup ...

== Obit ==
- Ua h-Uiccinn Sean mac Fergail Óicc priomh-shaoí Ereann lé dán d'écc.
- O'Higgin, i.e. John, the son of Farrell Oge, Chief Poet of Ireland, died.
