= Agher =

Townland and crossroads in County Meath, Ireland

Agher Achair or Achradh
- Townland/Crossroads
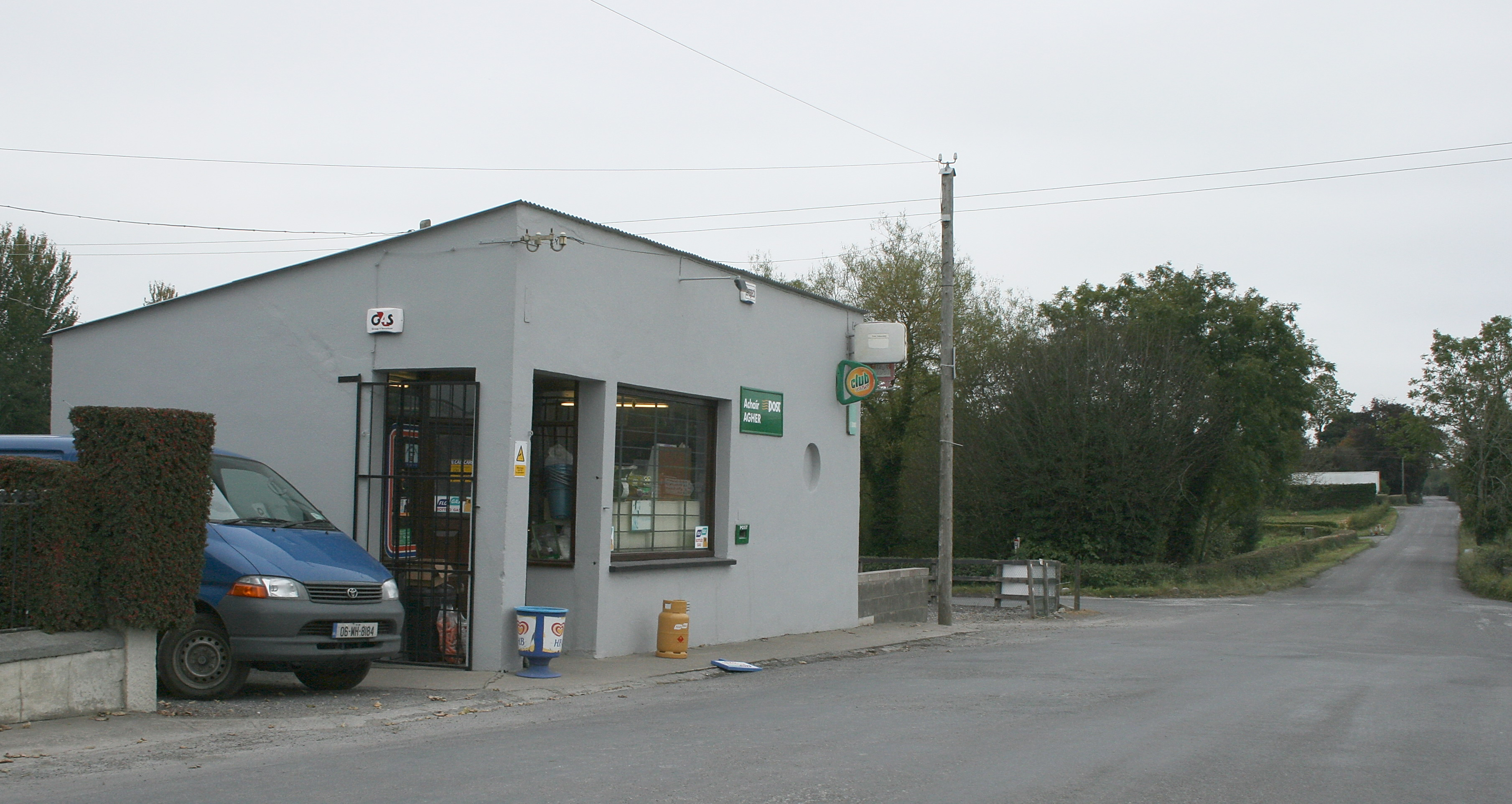
- Agher Post Office

- Location in Ireland
- Coordinates: 53°27′35″N 6°46′07″W
- Country: Ireland
- Province: Leinster
- County: Meath
- Dáil Éireann: Meath West
- Time zone: UTC+0 (WET)
  - Summer (DST): UTC-1 (IST (WEST))

Agher (Irish: Achair) is a crossroads and townland in County Meath, Ireland. It is located 3 km (1.9 mi) southwest of Summerhill. Agher is in a civil parish of the same name and in the barony of Deece Upper.

== Agher Demesne ==
Turn left at the crossroads; continue a kilometre down the road and on the left is the entrance to Agher Demesne or also called Agher Pallis. This was the seat of the Winter family, and had a number of out-houses, gardens, and orchards. The residence was situated in a demesne of about 350 acres (1.4 km^{2}). It is said that the cottages on his estate were excellent, showing Winter's regard for comfort of his tenants and employees.

=== Agher House ===
Agher House faced east with the wing to the south side. The gardens included trees and shrubs, with a pond to the west of the house.

The Winters had many servants including a butler, cook, housekeeper and maids as well as a coachman, a carpenter and a gardener. In the early 1930s Colonel Winter sold the estate to the Irish Land Commission. The Land Commission divided the land among some local people and people from the west and south of Ireland. The Commission tried to sell the house but could get no offers and in 1947 a decision was taken to demolish the house by controlled explosion. The rubble was pushed into the basement of the former mansion and a modern house was built beside it. The site retains some original features like the entrance, gate lodges, out-offices and the farmyard.

== Agher Church ==
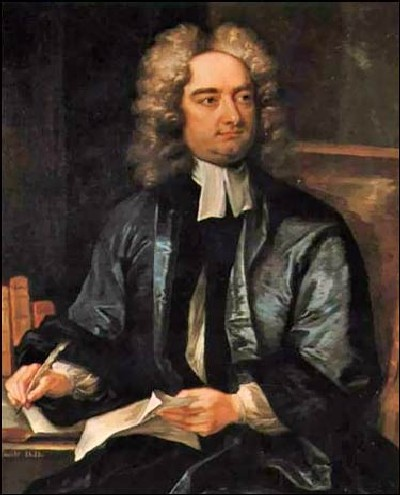
Jonathan Swift

Agher Church is the local Anglican church. The church holds a very important stained-glass window made by Thomas Jervais. It is the second-earliest known Irish-made stained-glass window. The unusual subject is St Paul preaching to the Athenians on top of Mars Hill outside the Court of Areopagus. The window was originally erected in the private chapel of the nearby Dangan Castle, the former stately home and seat of the Wellesley family (the childhood home of Arthur Wellesley, 1st Duke of Wellington), which burnt down in 1809. The window was presented to Agher by the O'Connor family, who were then occupying Dangan. Soon after the new Agher Church was constructed, Samuel Winter erected a family burial vault in the churchyard. Agher church was re-built in 1902. The church's history goes back to 1407, when The Reverend W. Edwards and Reverend N. Vale was a part of the clergy.

The poet, political writer, and clergyman Jonathan Swift (1667–1745) was rector of the Church of Ireland Church at Agher.

The adjoining cemetery contains the graves of the Winter family, who provided the land on which the church was built in 1802. Members of the O'Higgins Family who were descended from the Barons of Ballynary in County Sligo and of whom Bernardo O'Higgins of Chile was a kinsman are also buried in Agher Cemetery.

Agher Church is in the Rathmolyon and Dunboyne Union of parishes. The rector of the union is Rev. Eugene Griffin.

== Sport ==
Summerhill Golf Club is a 9 hold golf course located on the Rathmolyon end of the area close to the Rahinstown Estate. It is owned by the Nangle family. As of 2013, the captain was Joe Crowe.

Agher's local Association football (soccer) club is Park Celtic Summerhill. Originally formed in the 1980s as Agher Park FC, with just one team playing in the Meath and District League, the club grew to 12 teams by 1995. Agher Park FC amalgamated in 2009 with another local club Summerhill Celtic to become Park Celtic Summerhill.

== See also ==
- List of towns and villages in Ireland
