= Sean mac Fergail Óicc Ó hUiginn =

Irish poet (??–1490)

- Died: 1490
- Other name: John O'Higgin
- Occupation: Poet
- Known for: Chief Ollam of Ireland
- Family: Ó hUiginn

Sean mac Fergail Óicc Ó hUiginn (Anglicised: John O'Higgin, died 1490) was an Irish poet.

The son of Farrell Óg Ó hUigginn, Ó hUiginn held the post of Chief Ollam of Ireland. His sister, Elec Ní hUicinn, was murdered in 1471. He had at least one other sibling, Niall mac Fergal Óge Ó hUicinn (died 1461)

== See also ==
- Tadg Óg Ó hÚigínn
- Tadhg Dall Ó hÚigínn
- Philip Bocht Ó hUiginn
- Tadhg Mór Ó hUiginn
- Maol Sheachluinn na n-Uirsgéal Ó hUiginn

Preceded by Cearbhall mac Lochlainn Ó Dálaigh	Chief Ollam of Ireland ?-1490	Succeeded by Domnall mac Brian Ó hÚigínn?
