= O'Higgins (surname) =

O' Higgins is an Irish surname and a sept of the O' Neill family. It may refer to:

- Bernard O' Higgins, Bishop of Elphin (1542–64)
- William T. O' Higgins (1829 – 1874), Irish-American, Catholic chaplain during the American Civil War
- the following Irish politicians (all related):
  - Kevin O' Higgins (1892 – 1927), Irish politician
  - Thomas F. O' Higgins (d. 1953), Irish politician
  - Tom O'Higgins (1916 – 2003), Irish politician, barrister, and judge
  - Michael O' Higgins (1917 – 2005), Irish politician
- the following Chilean politicians (all related):
  - Bernardo O' Higgins (1778 – 1842), Chilean independence leader
  - Ambrosio O'Higgins, 1st Marquess of Osorno (1720? – 1801), colonial governor of Spanish America; father of Bernardo

== See also ==
- Ó hUiginn, the Irish version of the name
- O'Higgins (disambiguation)
- Higgins (surname)
