= Manuel Riquelme =

Manuel Riquelme de la Barrera y Vargas (1772-1857) was a Chilean military officer. Born in Chillán, Chile, he was the brother of Isabel Riquelme, mother of Bernardo O'Higgins.

== Biography ==
Manuel Riquelme spent most of his life in Los Angeles, along with his brothers, Estanislao, Francis and Simon. He started his military career at an early age, participating in the war for independence where he rose to master sergeant. He had outstanding participation in the personal guard of honor of his nephew Bernardo O'Higgins, with whom he had a strong friendship, accompanying him from his arrival from Europe to Chile in Los Angeles, on the quarry estates in 1802.

Manuel Riquelme was appointed Military Governor and Commander of Arms of the Plaza de Los Angeles remaining in that position until 1852, when he was appointed Minister of the martial arm of the . That year he was promoted to colonel, after which he received the rank of Brigadier General.

He was interviewed by great historians such as Diego Barros Arana and Claude Gay about the life of Bernardo O'Higgins and the period of the Chilean War of Independence.

== Personal life ==
Manuel Riquelme married Dona Carmen del Rio y Mier. His daughter Clorinda Riquelme del Rio married José María de la Maza. His family, like the descendants of the other Riquelme brothers, still live in Los Angeles. He died there in 1857/8.
