= Lochlainn Ó hUiginn =

Lochlainn Ó hUiginn (died 1464) was a member of the Ó hUiginn brehon family.

The Annals of Connacht relate that in 1461: Lochlainn son of Fercert O hUicinn died.

His father, Fercert Ó hUiginn, died in 1419.
