= O'Higgins =

O’Higgins may refer to:

== People ==
- O'Higgins (surname), lists notable people with the surname
- O'Higgins family

== Places ==
- O'Higgins Region, Chile
- O'Higgins, Chile, commune in the Capitán Prat Province, Aysén Region, Chile
- Villa O'Higgins, the capital of the O'Higgins commune
- Base General Bernardo O'Higgins Riquelme, Antarctica
- O'Higgins Park, Santiago, Chile
- O'Higgins Glacier, a glacier in the Southern Patagonian Ice Field
- O'Higgins (Buenos Aires), a locality in Buenos Aires province, Argentina
- Capitán General Bernardo O'Higgins, a locality in the province of Córdoba, Argentina
- Departamento O'Higgins, Chaco province, Argentina
- Hotel O'Higgins, Viña del Mar, Chile

== Sports ==
- O'Higgins F.C., a football club from Rancagua, Chile
- O'Higgins Braden, a defunct football club from Rancagua, Chile, one of the founder members of O'Higgins F.C.

== Ships ==
- Chilean ship O'Higgins, several ships operated by the Chilean Navy:
  - Chilean frigate O'Higgins (1816), a Chilean frigate commanded by Thomas Cochrane, Lord Cochrane
  - Chilean corvette O'Higgins (1866)
  - Chilean cruiser O'Higgins (1897)
  - Chilean cruiser O'Higgins (CL-02), ex-USS Brooklyn (CL-40)
  - Chilean submarine O'Higgins (SS-23)

== Other uses ==
- Instituto O'Higgins de Rancagua, a private Catholic school located in the center of Rancagua, Chile
- Order of Bernardo O'Higgins, an award issued by Chile awarded to non-Chilean citizens
- O'Higgins disease, a name for Argentine hemorrhagic fever, from the Buenos Aires locality
- 2351 O'Higgins, a minor planet
