= Petronila Riquelme =

Chilean and Mapuche-Pehuenche daughter of Bernardo O'Higgins

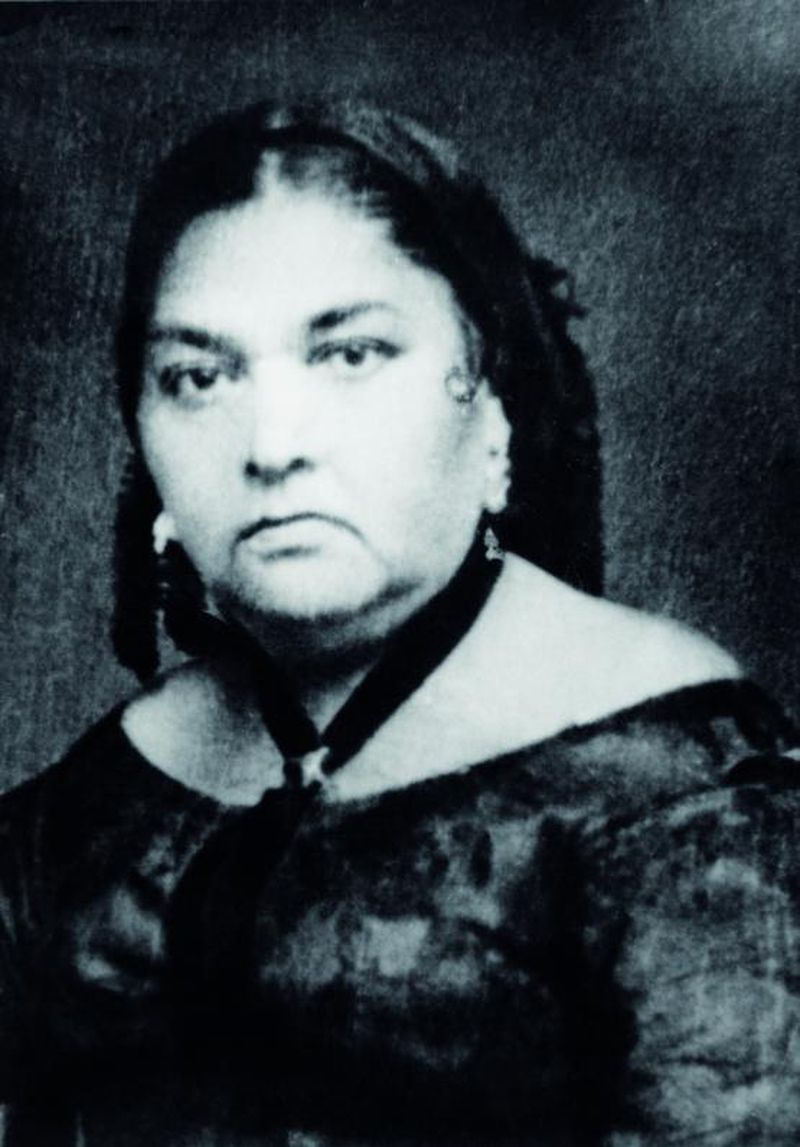
- Born: Petronila Riquelme Rodríguez c. 1808; Hacienda Las Canteras near Los Ángeles, Captaincy General of Chile, Spanish Empire
- Died: 29 March 1870 (aged 61–62); Chilean Sea near Valparaíso, Chile
- Resting place: Cementerio Nᵒ 1 de Valparaíso
- Other names: Petronila O'Higgins; Petronila Riquelme O'Higgins; Petronila Riquelme O'Higgins de Pequeño; Petronila Riquelme y Letelier
- Occupation: Servant
- Spouse: José Toribio Pequeño (m. 1837, separated)
- Children: 5
- Father: Bernardo O'Higgins
- Relatives: Rosa Rodríguez y Riquelme (aunt); Isabel Riquelme (grandmother); Ambrosio O'Higgins, 1st Marquess of Osorno (grandfather)
- Family: O'Higgins family

Petronila Riquelme Rodríguez (c. 1808 – 29 March 1870), known posthumously as Petronila O'Higgins, was a Chilean and Mapuche–Pehuenche servant and the unacknowledged daughter of Bernardo O'Higgins.

== Early life ==
Riquelme was born around 1808 at her father's estate Hacienda Las Canteras (Note: Also known as the La hacienda San José de Las Canteras.) near Los Ángeles to Bernardo O'Higgins and Patricia Rodríguez, a Mapuche–Pehuenche servant and nanny to the O'Higgins family. As O'Higgins' unacknowledged daughter, Riquelme was given her paternal grandmother's, Isabel Riquelme, surname as her second family name. Through her father's relationship with Rosario Puga, Riquelme was the elder half-sister of Pedro Demetrio O'Higgins.

Riquelme spent her early years at the Hacienda Las Canteras alongside both her parents. Though technically a servant, Riquelme held a special status in the household and received an education. On 19 July 1823, Riquelme joined her father, grandmother, half-brother and aunt Rosa Rodríguez y Riquelme in exile in Peru.

== Personal life ==
In 1837, Riquelme married José Toribio Pequeño, a Peruvian Criollo who later became the administrator of O'Higgins' estates. Riquelme's marriage certificate lists her name as Petronila Riquelme y Letelier, and her parents as Nicolás Riquelme and Juana Letelier. Riquelme's grandmother was listed as her godmother.

Riquelme and Pequeño had five children. Following the breakdown of her marriage in the late 1840s, Riquelme remained in Peru whilst her husband traveled to Chile with the couples five children. In 1870, Riquelme boarded a steamship from Callao to Valparaíso, but died of a On 29 March 1870 died of a heart attack 7 miles from port. Riquelme was buried at Cementerio Nᵒ 1 de Valparaíso.

Riquelme is the great-great-grandmother of the filmmaker Pamela Pequeño, and is the subject of Pequeño's 2001 documentary La hija de O'Higgins.
