= Bernardo O'Higgins Monument =

Equestrian monument in Santiago de Chile

Coordinates: 33.445358°S 70.653038°W

- Monumento a Bernardo O'Higgins
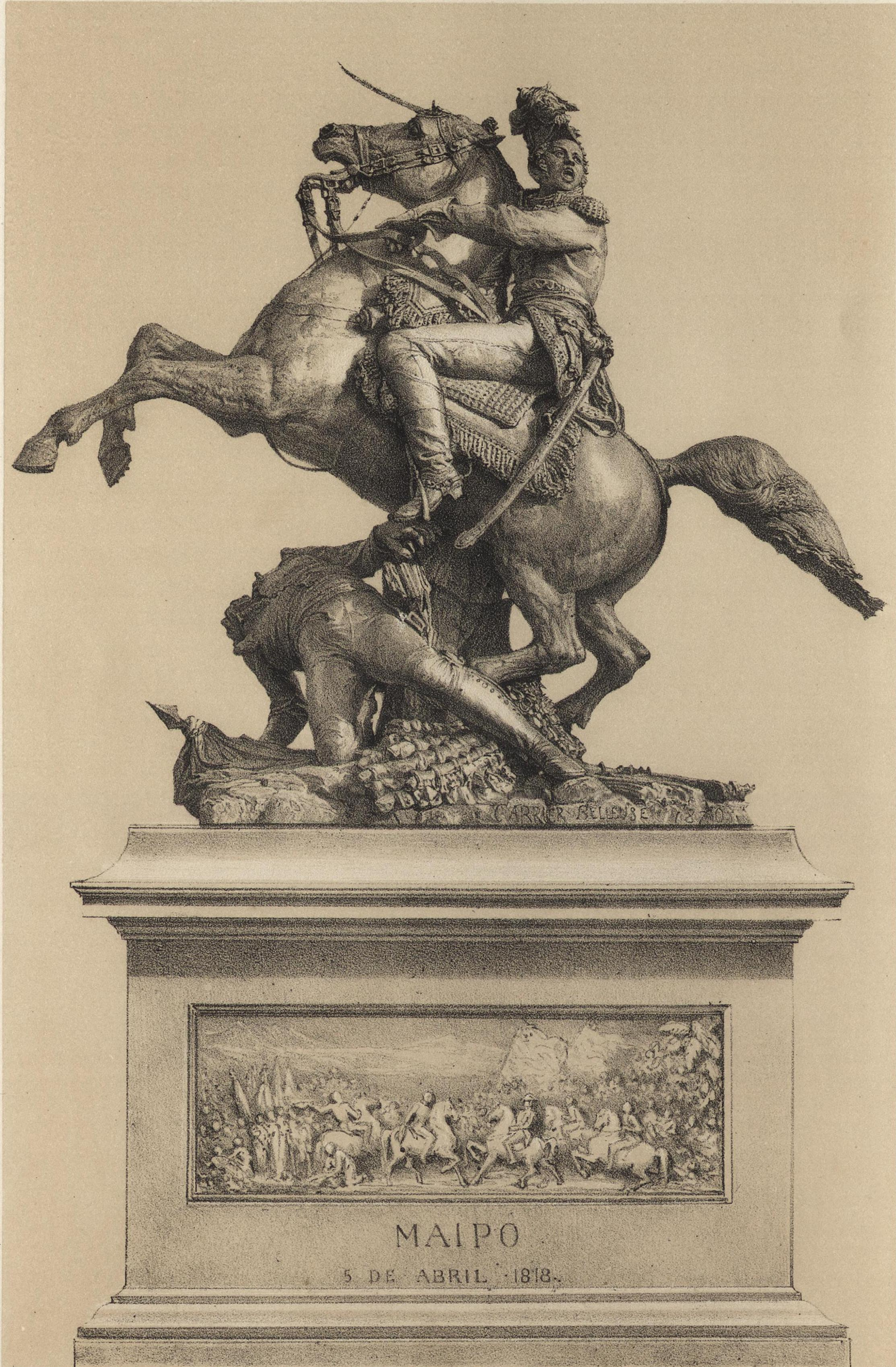
- Interactive map of Bernardo O'Higgins Monument
- Location: Santiago de Chile
- Builder: Albert-Ernest Carrier-Belleuse
- Type: Equestrian statue
- Material: Bronze
- Inauguration date: May 19th, 1872

The Bernardo O'Higgins monument is a bronze sculpture on a marble base that represents the moment in which Bernardo O'Higgins crossed over a defeated enemy of the royalist troops with his horse in the Battle of Rancagua in 1814. It is located in the Alameda in front of the Palacio de La Moneda, in the Plaza de la Ciudadanía in the city of Santiago, Chile.

Made by the French sculptor Albert-Ernest Carrier-Belleuse, it was inaugurated on May 19, 1872. Its pedestal presents four bas-reliefs that represent the life of the hero, two of them made by the Chilean sculptor Nicanor Plaza. It was inaugurated on May 19, 1872.

== History ==
=== Projects and realization ===
In 1844, President Manuel Bulnes sent a bill to the Senate proposing the repatriation of the remains of Bernardo O'Higgins, who died in exile in Peru, and the construction of a monument in his honor in the capital. This initiative did not come into fruition, but it was taken up by an article published in the newspaper El Ferrocarril in 1863, which received official support in 1868 when the exhumation ceremonies and the transfer of the remains from Lima took place.

Parallel to the transfer, a commission was formed for the creation of a monument, which called for a public competition in Paris through the Chilean Consul General in France, Francisco Fernández Rodella. Among the pre-established guidelines of the contest was the express participation of the Chilean sculptor Nicanor Plaza, for his collaboration with the reliefs of the statue. The winning project was the equestrian monument by the Frenchman Albert-Ernest Carrier-Belleuse, who had the sculpture cast in the workshops of Fourment, Houille & Cía. Once finished, it was dispatched by Consul Rodella from France in July 1871.

=== Inauguration ===
The inauguration of the monument took place on May 19, 1872, in the midst of several ceremonies. The streets and avenues of Santiago dawned with banners, and the military bands played the National Anthem in front of the barracks. President Federico Errázuriz Zañartu made his entrance around 2:00 p.m., accompanied by his ministers and escorted by the “Cazadores” Regiment, followed by columns of elementary and high school students with flags.

The unveiling of the monument, which was covered by a tricolor cloth, gave way to the singing of the National Anthem and the presentation of arms of the various garrisons. This was followed by speeches by the authorities present and a parade of the armed forces held at 5:30 p.m. Fireworks were set off at the monument at dusk.

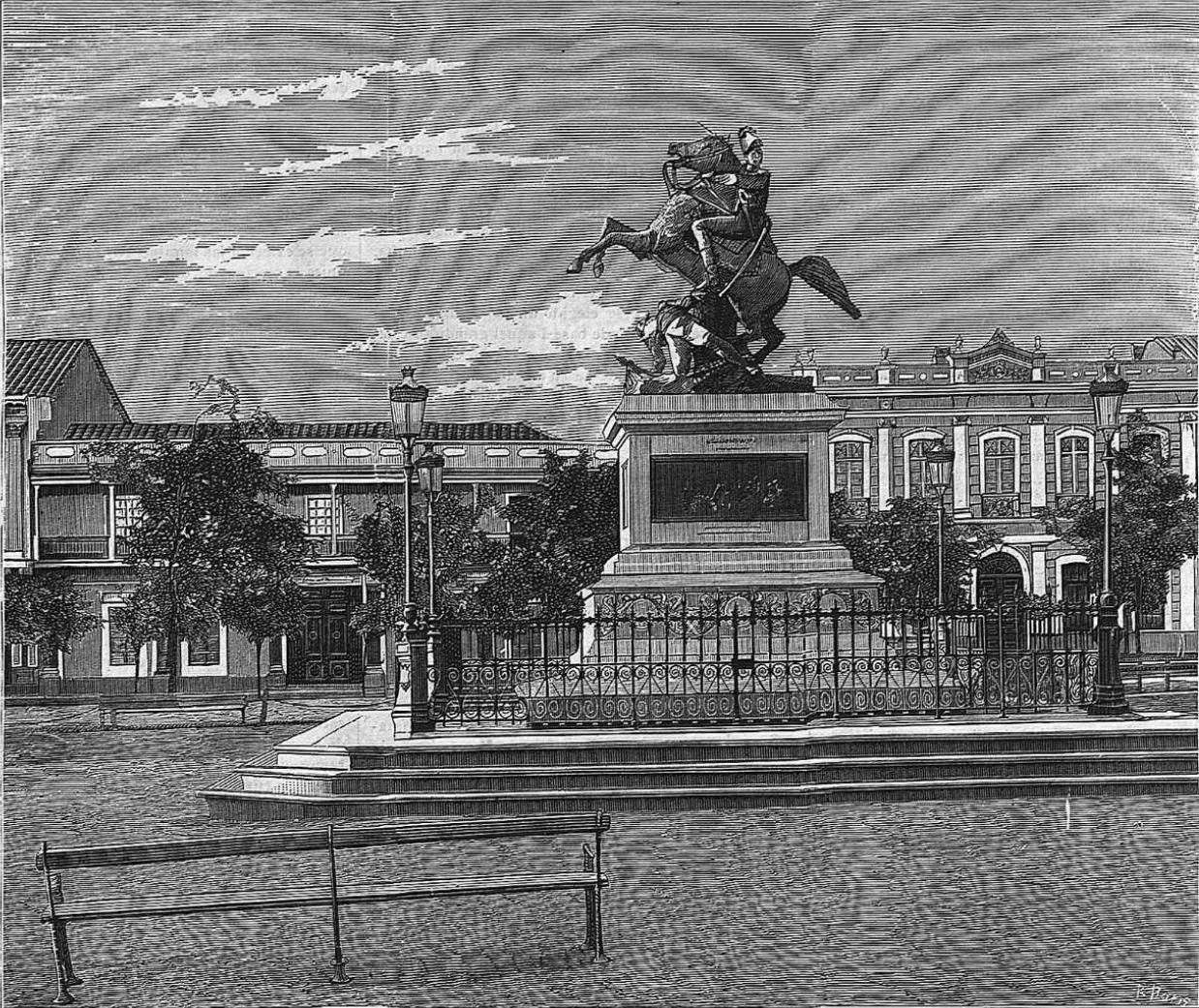
The monument in 1879.

=== Location ===
When it was inaugurated, the monument was placed in the central oval of the Alameda in front of the La Moneda Palace, a space that O'Higgins himself designed when he transformed La Cañada into a public promenade. It remained in this place until 1978 when it became part of the architectural complex of the Altar de la Patria, in the southern sector of the Barrio Cívico. The altar, built to house the remains of O'Higgins in a subway crypt, was built on the esplanade at the entrance of Paseo Bulnes, and with its transformation, was renamed Plaza Libertador B. O'Higgins. The complex had the equestrian monument in its highest part, protruding from the street level, located behind the copper amphora containing the Llama de la Libertad.

The monument remained at the Altar de la Patria until the final eradication of the architectural complex due to the construction of the Plaza de la Ciudadanía, as part of the works to commemorate the Bicentennial of Chile, which began in 2004. The square was inaugurated in 2006 by President Ricardo Lagos, and transformed the place where the altar was located into a clean esplanade. The equestrian statue took its position in the Plaza de la Ciudadanía, on the south side of the Alameda, in the eastern sector of the square.

The monument to José Miguel Carrera, which was located on Alameda and Calle Dieciocho, was moved to the western sector of the square in 2010, where a fountain had been located since the creation of the Plaza de la Ciudadanía, as a way of symbolically reuniting both heroes of Chile's independence in view of the nation's Bicentennial.

== Description ==
The bronze monument, which stands on a marble pedestal, represents the moment when Bernardo O'Higgins crosses with his horse over a defeated enemy of the royalist troops in the Battle of Rancagua, in 1814. The rider wears a brigadier general's uniform and a pointed hat. He holds his sword up in his right hand and the bridle of the horse in his left hand, which is supported on its hind legs.

On the sides of the pedestal, there are four bas-reliefs, which bear phrases pronounced by O'Higgins and represent milestones in the life of the hero. The Battle of El Roble and The Abdication of O'Higgins were made by Nicanor Plaza, while The Departure of the Liberating Squadron and The Meeting of O'Higgins and San Martin in Maipú are works by Carrier-Belleuse.

The bas-relief of the Battle de El Roble shows O'Higgins wounded in one leg. An oil painting by the French painter Raymond Monvoisin was taken as reference in the bas-relief that shows his abdication. The Departure of the Liberating Squadron shows O'Higgins and Minister José Ignacio Zenteno on horseback on the road to Santiago, with O'Higgins pointing to the sails that are moving away in the background. The Meeting of O'Higgins and San Martín shows a greeting of both heroes on the battlefield of Maipú.

== See also ==
- Equestrian monument to General Manuel Belgrano
- Plaza de la Ciudadanía
- Llama de la Libertad
