= Brian Óge Ó hUiginn =

Irish poet (??–1505)

- Died: 1505
- Writing career
- Genre: Poetry

Brian Óge Ó hUiginn, Irish poet, died 1505.

Brian Óge was a member of a branch of the Ó hUiginn brehon family.

The Annals of the Four Masters recorded his death, sub anno 1505, as follows:

- Brian Oge, the son of Brian, son of Donnell Cam O'Higgin, died. Mentioned in the same obituary was his kinsman, Cairbre mac Brian Ó hUiginn.
