= Foraire Uladh ar Aodh =

15th century Irish poem

Foraire Uladh ar Aodh is an Irish poem by Maol Sheachluinn na n-Uirsgéal Ó hUiginn.

Composed in the early fifteenth century, it is an address to Aodh mac Art Mag Aonghusa, Chief of Uí Echach Cobo. It "... apparently became accepted as a masterpiece in the bardic schools, since it was the model for Eochaidh Ó hÉoghusa's more tongue-in-cheek treatment, Bíodh aire ag Ultaibh ar Aodh.

Mag Aonghusa controlled the Newry Pass, which played an important part in preventing the forces of the Dublin government entering Ulster to contest the rebels of the province; this made him:

"literally the procective sentinel of the province. ...There was some factural basis for the imagery of the tireless watchman, since the Annals give evidence suggesting that during times of open hostility the frontiers of Ireland's small lordships were guarded by horse-patrols to give the inhabitants early warning of approaching cattle-raid. .. the image of the patron as a vigilant sentilel could be used to evoke a more radical symbolism of the king as cowherd or shepherd (buachaill or aoghaire) of his subjects, standing between them and all perils, natural and supernatural."
