= Tadg Óg Ó hUiginn =

Irish poet (c.1370–1448)

Tadg Óg Ó hUiginn (born c.1370, died 1448) was an Irish poet.

== Life and background ==
Ó hUiginn was a member of a well-known Irish family of bards, based in Connacht. His father, Tadhg Mór Ó hUiginn, died in 1391, while all that is known of his mother is her first name, Áine. He had an elder brother, Fearghal Ruadh Ó hUiginn, who succeeded his father as head of the family and died c.1400. The historian of Medieval Gaelic Ireland, Marc Caball, believes him to have been a great-grandson of Tadhg Ó hUiginn, a celebrated poet who died in 1315.

Further personal details are few, but he did marry and have issue. His descendants included Maol Muire Ó hÚigínn who became an Archbishop of Tuam in 1586, and the poet Tadhg Dall Ó hUiginn (died c.1591). The Irish annals state that he kept a school for training in Irish bardic poetry with lodgings for scholars and pilgrims, and died at Kilconla (Middle Irish: Cill Chonnla; Irish: Cill Chluaine) (Note: Kilconla was still in use in at least some records into the 19th century. The locality is now known as Kilclooney or Kilcloney, and Cill Chluaine in Irish. Remains of the Ó hUiginn bardic school are still present at Kilclooney near Milltown, with advisory signs directing drivers to "Kilclooney Castle and O'Higgins Bardic School, 15th-16th century", in both Irish and English.) in the barony of Dunmore, County Galway, in 1448. He was buried in the priory of Strade, now in County Mayo.

His school at Kilconla was still functioning in 1574, overseen by his descendant, Domhnall Ó hUiginn.

== Poetic works ==
Ó hUiginn enjoyed a great professional reputation within his own lifetime, and was regarded as a master poet. His work enjoyed a wide range of appreciation, which apparent from the long list of prominent Gaelic-Irish and Anglo-Irish lords who were subjects of his work:

- O'Donnell of Tyrconnell
- O'Neill of Tyrone
- Butler of Ormond
- Burke of Clanricarde
- Mac William Bourke of Mayo
- O'Kelly of Ui Maine
- O'Carroll of Éile (Anglicised as Ely)
- MacDonnell of Islay
- MacDermot of Moylurg
- Maguire of Fermanagh
- O'Conor Sligo
- O'Conor Kerry

Upon the death of his brother in 1400, Tadg Óg composed a poem of lament for Fearghal Ruadh. Written in or around 1400, when Tadg Óg was in his early thirties, it is entitled Anocht sgaoilid na sgola (also known by the initial line of stanza 14, Me a dhearbhrathair 's a dhalta).

Marc Caball draws attention to Ó hUiginn's success in "composing works of affective power and elegance ... nothwithstanding the somewhat formulaic configuration of the bardic form."

Devotional Christian poetry by Ó hUiginn's formed part of the Yellow Book of Lecan. Extracts of his verse were cited as models of poetic excellence in bardic school and tutorial tracts.

== Selected works ==
- A-táid trí comhruig im chionn
- Cia do-ghéabhainn go Gráinne
- Dá bhrághaid uaim i nInis
- Foillsigh do mhíorbhuile, a Mhuire

== See also ==
- Sean mac Fergail Óicc Ó hUiccinn, died 1490
- Philip Bocht Ó hUiginn
- Maol Sheachluinn na n-Uirsgéal Ó hUiginn
- Filí, the hereditary elite bardic poets of Gaelic Ireland
- Irish bardic poetry
