= Domhnall Ó hUiginn =

Domhnall Ó hÚigínn (fl. 1574) was an Irish poet and teacher.

Domhnall was a member of the same clan as Tadhg Dall Ó hÚigínn (1550–1591) and the scribe of Leabhar Cloinne Aodha Buidhe (fl. 1680).

This branch of the Uí hÚigínn ran a school of poetry at Kilclooney, near Milltown, County Galway. They were a branch of the Uí hÚigínn Magheny, County Sligo. They had originally settled there at the request of Brian mac Domhnaill Ó Conchobhair Sligo (ruled 1403–1440).

The Book of the Burkes is a surviving manuscript, created by Tadhg Dall Ó hÚigínn, and Domhnall's son, Ruaidhrí Ó hÚigínn.

Domhnall himself is listed as in possession of Kilclooney castle in 1575, and there he conducted a well renowned bardic school ... possibly under the patronage of the local O'Connors ... One bardic poem of Tadhg Dall Ó hÚigínn ... informs us that Ulster students came to study at Kilclooney. Scottish students were also reputed to have attended there.
