= John Higgins of Montoge =

Sir John Higgins of Montoge (1678–1729) was an Irish physician and Jacobite.

== Biography ==
Higgins was a descendant of the O'Higgins of Montiagh, an Irish noble family who lost their lands in Sligo under the rule of Oliver Cromwell in Ireland about 1649. His parents were a Dr. Patrick Higgins of Limerick City and his wife Mary Loftus of Annacotty. He was a cousin of Don Esteban de Iguiño (Stephen Higgins) who was Spanish General of the Infantry in the Army of Philippine islands. Sir John Higgins was born in 1678, and after the Treaty of Limerick in 1691 left Ireland to live in exile with his family at the Court of James II at St. Germaine in France. In 1700, he graduated as a Doctor of Medicine from the University of Montpellier and then undertook further studies in Paris and Holland. In 1703, he went to Spain where he served in action as medical officer to the combined French and Spanish forces.

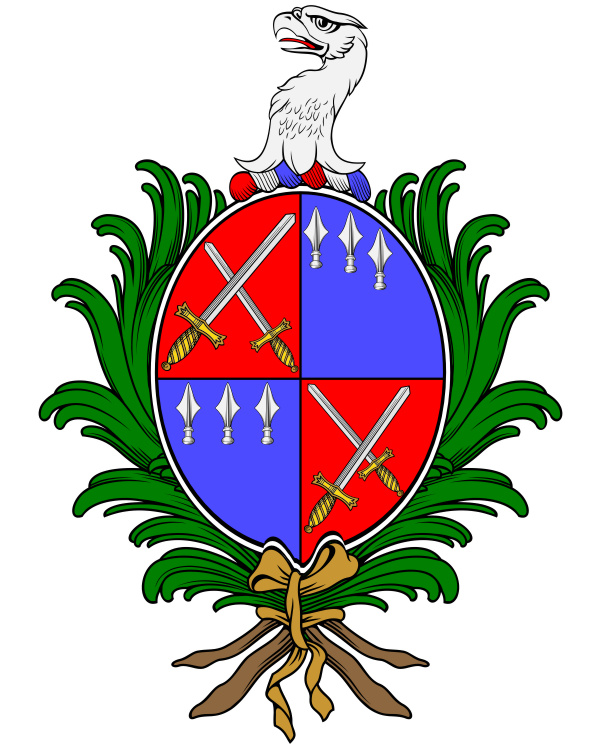
Arms of Sir John Higgins recorded by Athlone Herald, 1724.

In 1712, he married the daughter of John Baptiste de Courtiade, the town doctor of Bayonne. In 1714, Higgins worked unsparingly for the relief of the soldiers in the Siege of Barcelona. In 1717, he received the highest medical post in Spain, the office of Proto-médico de Camera. The following year he was elected President of the Royal Academy of Medicine and Surgery of Seville. He held the post of Chief Physician to King Philip V from 1713 until his death in 1729, receiving the substantial salary of 81.528 reales de vellón. Higgins remained a good friend to Ireland and the Irish in Spain and when war was declared on England in 1718, he was instrumental in preventing the confiscation of the goods and property of the Irish merchants.

In 1721, the Duc de Saint-Simon fell ill with smallpox while he was French Ambassador to Spain. The King sent Higgins to care for him and the Duc recovered. In 1722 Higgins received the title Councillor of Castille from Philip V of Spain, and in 1723 he corresponded Sir James Terry who was Athlone Herald to the exiled Stuarts in France and Italy regarding a confirmation of his family's Arms. In 1724 James III made him a Knight and Baronet for his services to France. John Higgins died in Seville at the age of 51 but his descendants continued in Spain. In his will, he made provisions for the welfare of his widowed mother back in Limerick, plus alms for the poor of that city to be distributed by the Catholic clergy.
