= Rosa Rodríguez y Riquelme =

Chilean executor of Bernardo O'Higgins (1781-1850)

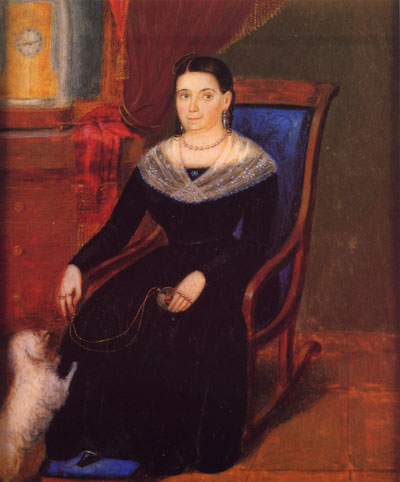
- Portrait of Rodríguez, 19th Century
- Born: 30 August 1781; Chillán Viejo, Captaincy General of Chile, Viceroyalty of Peru, Spanish Empire
- Died: 17 December 1850 (aged 69); Lima, Peru
- Other names: Rosa O'Higgins; Rosita O'Higgins
- Occupation: Executor
- Mother: Isabel Riquelme
- Relatives: Bernardo O'Higgins (half-brother); Petronila Riquelme (niece)
- Family: O'Higgins family

Rosa Rodríguez y Riquelme (30 August 1781 – 17 December 1850), also known as Rosa O'Higgins, was the Chilean half-sister of Bernardo O'Higgins and executor of his estate.

== Early life ==
Rodríguez was born on 30 August 1781 in Chillán Viejo, Captaincy General of Chile (present-day Chile) to Félix Rodríguez Rojas (died 1782) and Isabel Riquelme. Rodríguez was the younger maternal half-sister of Bernardo O'Higgins, and the older maternal half-sister of Maria de las Nieves Puga y Riquelme (1790-1868).

== Career ==
=== Chilean War of Independence ===
In 1813 Rodríguez, her mother and half-sister were taken as prisoners of war by Royalist troops during the Chilean War of Independence. Rodríguez and her family were released two months later during a prisoner exchange between Royalist and Patriot forces.

Following the Battle of Rancagua Rodríguez went into exile in Mendoza and later to Buenos Aires alongside her mother. In Buenos Aires Rodríguez and her mother sold and made cigars.

=== Return to Chile ===
In 1817, after the Battle of Chacabuco and Maipú, Rodríguez returned to Chile and lived with O'Higgins in the governor's palace in Santiago.

During O'Higgins's position as the Supreme Director of Chile Rodríguez became commercially involved with Antonio Arcos amd José Antonio Rodríguez Aldea. The legality of Rodríguez's business dealings were called into question.

=== Exile ===
In 1823, Rodríguez joined her brother, mother, niece Petronila Riquelme and nephew Pedro Demetrio O'Higgins in exile in Peru. Following her mother's death in 1839, Rodríguez took over the control of the running of O'Higgins' estate.

After her brothers death on 24 October 1842, Rodríguez became the executor and administrator of O'Higgins' estate.

== Personal life ==
On 17 December 1850 Rodríguez died in Lima, aged 69.

In 1947, Rodríguez's remains were repatriated in Santiago. In 1993, Rodríguez was buried at the Bernardo O'Higgins Monumental Park in Chillán conurbation.
