= Cairbre mac Brian Ó hUiginn =

Irish poet (??–1505)

Cairbre mac Brian Ó hUiginn, Irish poet, who died in 1505.

He was a member of a branch of the Ó hUiginn brehon family. The Annals of the Four Masters recorded his death, sub anno 1505, as follows:

- Carbry, the son of Brian O'Higgin, Professor of Poetry, died in Westmeath. Mentioned in the same obituary was his kinsman, Brian Óge Ó hUiginn.

His father was Brian Ó hUiginn, whose other sons included the poets Domnall mac Brian Ó hÚigínn and Aed mac Brian Ó hUiginn.
