= Isabel Riquelme =

First Lady of Chile (1758–1839)

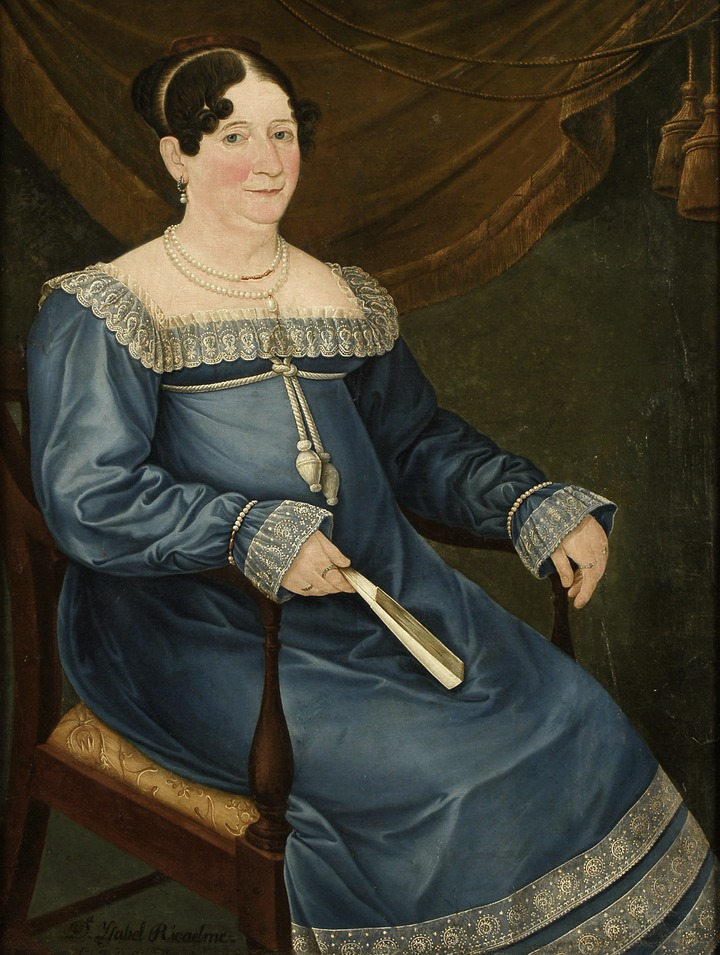
- Portrait by José Gil de Castro, early 1820s

First Lady of Chile
- In role 17 February 1817 – 28 January 1823
- President: Bernardo O'Higgins
- Preceded by: Mercedes Fontecilla
- Succeeded by: Manuela Caldera

Personal details
- Born: María Isabel Riquelme de la Barrera y Meza; 6 March 1758 Chillán, Captaincy General of Chile, Viceroyalty of Peru, Spanish Empire
- Died: 21 April 1839 (aged 81) Lima, Republic of North Peru, Peruvian Republic, Peru–Bolivian Confederation
- Resting place: Bernardo O'Higgins Monumental Park
- Spouse: Félix Rodríguez y Rojas (m. 1780; died 1782)
- Relations: Manuel Riquelme (half-brother); Petronila Riquelme (granddaughter)
- Children: 3 including, Bernardo O'Higgins; Rosa Rodríguez y Riquelme

María Isabel Riquelme de la Barrera y Meza (6 March 1758 – April 21, 1839), was the mother of Chilean independence leader Bernardo O'Higgins and First Lady of Chile.

== Early life and family ==
María Isabel Riquelme de la Barrera y Meza was born on 6 March 1758 in Chillán, Captaincy General of Chile (present-day Chile) to Simón Riquelme de la Barrera y Goycochea, a Mayor and landowner, and María Mercedes de Mesa y Ulloa (died 1758). Riquelme's mother died during childbirth. Riquelme was the older half sister of Manuel Riquelme de la Barrera y Vargas, a military officer.

In either 1776 or 1777, Riquelme met the 56-year old Ambrosio O'Higgins, 1st Marquess of Osorno, the future Royal Governor of Chile and Viceroy of Peru, at her father's house. Following a brief relationship, Riquelme became pregnant and gave birth to Bernardo O'Higgins in August 1778.

On 1 June 1780, Riquelme married Félix Rodríguez y Rojas (died 1782) with whom she had Rosa Rodríguez y Riquelme. Riquelme later began a relationship with Manuel de Puga y Figueroa in 1789, with whom she a daughter Maria de las Nieves de Puga y Riquelme (1790–1868).

== Chilean War of Independence ==
In 1813, Riquelme and her two daughters were taken as prisoners of war by Royalist troops during the Chilean War of Independence. Riquelme and her family were released two months later during a prisoner exchange between Royalist and Patriot forces.

Following the Battle of Rancagua Riquelme when into exile in Mendoza and later to Buenos Aires. In Buenos Aires Riquelme and her daughter Rosa sold and made cigars.

== Return to Chile and Exile ==
During Bernardo O'Higgins's position as the Supreme Director of Chile Riquelme was the First Lady of Chile.

In 1823, Riquelme joined her son, daughter Rosa, and grandchildren Petronila Riquelme and Pedro Demetrio O'Higgins in exile in Peru.

== Personal life ==
On 21 April 1839 Riquelme died in Lima, Republic of North Peru (present-day, Peru). Riquelme is buried at the Bernardo O'Higgins Monumental Park in Chillán conurbation.

Honorary titles
Preceded by Mercedes Fontecilla	First Lady of Chile; 1817–1823	Succeeded by Manuela Caldera
