= Hugh Higgins of Tyrawley =

Hugh Higgins of Tyrawley was a blind Irish harper, 1737-after 1791.

Higgins was a descendant of the Ó hUiginn family of poets, scribes, and historians. He was a native of Tirawley in north-east County Mayo and noted as having a more "respectable appearance and retinue than most travelling musicians." O'Neill remarks that "his parents being in comfortable circumstances. Blindness in early life led him to the study of the harp, and being gifted in a musical sense, he made rapid progress."

Higgins was a friend of the harper Owen Keenan, who was imprisoned in Omagh for attempting to break into the house of a Mr. Stuart of Killmoon, near Cookstown, County Tyrone. He was conducting an affair with Mr. Stuart's French governess.

Upon hearing of Keenan's plight (according to Captain Francis O'Neill), Higgins

"...readily procured his admission to see his friend. The jailer was not at home but his wife was. She loved music and cordials and being once a beauty was by no means insensible to flattery even from men who could not see. She fell an easy victim to their wiles, and the blind harpers contrived to steal the keys out of her pocket, oppressed as she was with love and music."

"They did not forget to make the turnkey drunk also, and while Higgins remained behind soothering his infatuated dupe, Keenan escaped with Higgins' boy on his back to guide him over a ford in the river Strule, by which he took his ,,, back to Kilmoon and repeated the offense for which he had been previously imprisoned."

He was the Hugh Higgins, blind Native of Mayo age 75 years, who performed at the Belfast Harp Festival in 1791. He had performed at Granard in 1791 "but won no premiums. In fact, he did not play at all at the second hall at Granard, having taken offense at something connected with the arrangements. Arthur O'Neill's avowed friendship for Higgins was a guarantee of his respectability."
