= Niall O'Higgin =

Irish poet

Niall O'Higgin (Irish: Niall mac Aed Ó hUiginn; fl. 1414) was an Irish poet.

Niall was a member of the Ó hUiginn family of Connacht, but resided in what is now County Westmeath. He participated in a famous incident recounted in the Annals of the Four Masters, sub anno 1414:

- John Stanley, the Deputy of the King of England, arrived in Ireland, a man who gave neither mercy nor protection to clergy, laity, or men of science, but subjected as many of them as he came upon to cold, hardship, and famine. It was he who plundered Niall, the son of Hugh O'Higgin, at Uisneach, in Meath. Henry Dalton, however, plundered James Tuite and the King's people, and gave the O'Higgins out of the preys then acquired a cow for each and every cow taken from them, and afterwards escorted them to Connaught. The O'Higgins, with Niall, then satirized John Stanley, who lived after this satire but five weeks, for he died of the virulence of the lampoons. This was the second poetical miracle performed by this Niall O'Higgin, the first being the discomfiture of the Clann-Conway the night they plundered Niall at Cladann; and the second, the death of John Stanley.
