= Niall mac Fergal Óge Ó hUicinn =

Irish poet

- Died: 1461
- Writing career
- Genre: Poetry

Niall mac Fergal Óge Ó hUicinn, Irish poet, died 1461.

The Annals of Connacht sub anno 1461 note the death of a number of Irish poets, including Niall:

- O Dalaig of Corcomroe, Niall Oc O hUicinn and Niall son of Fergal Oc O hUicinn died.

His sister, Elec Ní hUicinn, was murdered at her home in 1471, while his brother Sean mac Fergail Óicc Ó hÚigínn, died as Chief Ollamh of Ireland in poetry in 1490.
