= Elec Ní hUicinn =

Irish noblewoman (??–1471)

Elec Ní hUicinn, was an Irish noblewoman, murdered 1471.

The Annals of Connacht, sub anno 1471,

- An attack was made by Mac Gosdelb after his own kinsmen and they killed Elec daughter of Fergal Oc O hUiginn, wife of Conchobar son of Ruaidri Oc O hUiginn, in her own house at Machaire na nAilech, most unhappily.

She would appear to have been related to Brian Ó hUiginn, who died in 1476, as both of their fathers were called Fergal or Farrell. Her brother, Niall son of Fergal Oc O hUicinn, died in 1461. Another brother, Sean mac Fergail Óicc Ó hÚigínn, died as Chief Ollamh of Ireland in poetry in 1490.
