= Chilean ship O'Higgins =

Several ships of the Chilean Navy have been named O'Higgins after Bernardo O'Higgins Chilean independence leader

- Chilean frigate O'Higgins (1816)
- Chilean corvette O'Higgins
- Chilean cruiser O'Higgins (1897) was an armored cruiser that served from 1898 until 1933.
- Chilean cruiser O'Higgins (CL-02) was the former USS Brooklyn sold by the United States to Chile in 1951, and served until 1992.
- Chilean submarine O'Higgins
