= Ballynary =

Townland in County Sligo, Ireland

Coordinates: 54.082°N 8.323°W

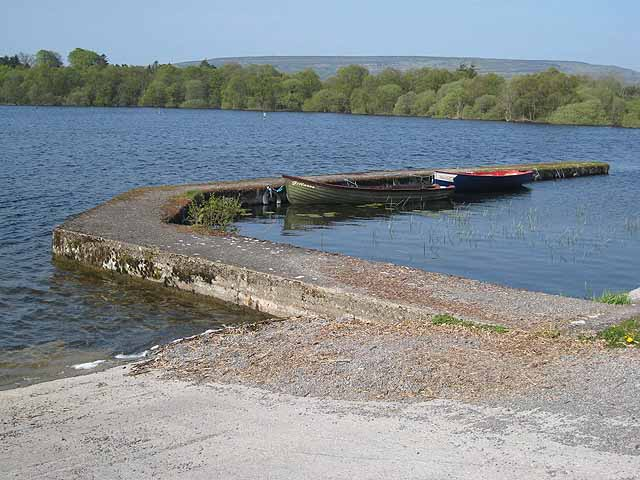
Jetty at Loughbrick Bay on Lough Arrow, between Ballynary and Annaghgowan townlands

Ballynary (Irish: Baile an Fharaidh, meaning 'townland of the fodder') is a townland on the eastern shore of Lough Arrow in south County Sligo, Ireland. Ballynary was the ancestral seat of the O'Higgins family (or Ó hUiginn in Irish) for 700 years, until they were forced off their lands in 1654 by Oliver Cromwell.

The townland of Ballynary is just over 210 acres (85 ha) in area, and is 2 km (1.2 mi) from Ballindoon where the ruins of a Dominican Abbey, founded by the MacDonagh Clan, are located. Ballynary also contains the O'Higgins Memorial Park which is dedicated to Ambrose O'Higgins, born in Ballynary in 1720 and who—emigrating to Spain to escape the discrimination against Irish Catholics in his time—eventually became the Viceroy of Peru, then part of the Spanish Empire. His son Bernardo O'Higgins became the first Supreme Director of Chile.

The Chilean city of Vallenar was founded by Ambrose O'Higgins and named for his birthplace, the variant spelling having developed through usage by Spanish-speaking inhabitants. The name of Vallenar Bay in Alaska is derived from the Chilean name and thus indirectly from the Irish one.
