= Philip Bocht Ó hUiginn =

Irish poet (died 1487)

Philip Bocht Ó hUiginn, Irish poet, died 1487.

== Background ==
Ó hUiginn was a member of a Connacht-based family of bards. His father was Conn Crosach, but nothing else is known of his place within the family, or where he lived. His obituary in the Annals of Ulster describes him as an observant Franciscan brother. His membership of this order led to his nickname bocht (poor), as the Franciscans observed vows of poverty.

== Poems ==
Ó hUiginn's poetry is exclusively religious. Clearly highly trained, he utilised the strict Dán Díreach form of Classical Modern Irish. Much of his verse used complex and very difficult metres with ease and to good effect. Frequently invoking Saint Francis and Saint Michael, they however show little of theology and are more of a type associated with lay bards. They give almost no glimpse of his personal life and times. His compositions however enjoyed a high level of popularity among fellow poets in his lifetime,

Twenty-eight poems are ascribed to him. Twenty-seven are in McKenna's 1931 edition, while poem 58 of Dioghluim Dána gives him as its author in one manuscript.

Ó hUiginn was further distinguished by being the first Irish poet to have his work published in Gaelic. Tuar feirge foighide Dé was published in Irish script in Dublin in 1571.

== Obituary ==
Ó hUiginn's death was noted in the Annals of Ulster, sub anno 1487. It accorded him the status of best and most prolific composer of religious verse "in recent times", again suggestive of his popularity in his lifetime. His place of death is unknown.

== See also ==
- Tadg Óg Ó hÚigínn
- Tadhg Dall Ó hÚigínn
- Tadhg Mór Ó hUiginn
- Maol Sheachluinn na n-Uirsgéal Ó hUiginn
