= Llama de la Libertad =

Defunct ceremonial flame commemorating 1973 Chilean coup

Coordinates: 33.4454°S 70.6533°W

The Llama de la Libertad or Llama Eterna de la Libertad (lit. "Flame of Liberty" or "Eternal Flame of Liberty") was a ceremonial flame located in Plaza Bulnes in Santiago, Chile. It was lit on September 11, 1975 by Augusto Pinochet to commemorate the 1973 Chilean coup d'etat against the presidency of Salvador Allende. The Llama de la Libertad was part of a larger monument called Altar de la Patria (lit. "Altar of the Fatherland") and was a symbol of the military dictatorship that ruled Chile from 1973 to 1990.

== Extinguishing ==
In 2003 the government announced through minister Francisco Vidal that the presidency would cease funding the flame due to budget cuts. In response to this the Mayor of Providencia, Cristián Labbé, said his commune would fund the flame, but this proposal was superseded days later when Minister Michelle Bachelet announced the Ministry of National Defense would fund the flame.

On October 18 of 2004 the flame was finally extinguished due to the works done on the new Barrio Cívico, itself a commemoration of the upcoming Bicentennial of Chile.

A similar flame in Punta Arenas, also lit by Pinochet, was extinguished in 2013.
