= Fercert Ó hUiginn =

Fercert Ó hUiginn (died 1419) was an Irish poet.

Fercert was a member of the Ó hUiginn brehon family of Connacht. His obit, sub anno 1419 in the Annals of the Four Masters, identifies him as the head of Ó hUiginn line descended from the poet Gilla na Neamh Ó h-Uiginn, who died in 1349:

- Ferceart, the son of Higgin, son of Gilla-na-naev O'Higgin, the Kennfinè of the race of Gilla-na-naev O'Higgin, died.
