= Tadhg Mór Ó hUiginn =

Irish poet (died 1315)

Tadhg Mór Ó hUiginn (d. 1315) was an Irish poet.

Ó hUiginn was a member of a highly regarded Connacht O'Higgins family of bards. His surviving poems include:

- Gach éan mar a adhbha
- Slán fat fholcadh

== See also ==
- O'Higgins family
- Tadg Óg Ó hUiginn
- Tadhg Dall Ó hUiginn
- Philip Bocht Ó hUiginn
- Maol Sheachluinn na n-Uirsgéal Ó hUiginn
