= Brian Ó hUiginn =

Irish poet (??–1476)

Brian Ó hUiginn, Irish poet, died Maundy Thursday, 1476.

== Biography ==
Brian was a member of a branch of the Ó hUiginn brehon family, based in what is now County Mayo.

The Annals of the Four Masters recorded his death, sub anno 1476, as follows:

- Brian, the son of Farrell Roe O'Higgin, head of his own tribe, superintendent of the schools of Ireland, and preceptor in poetry, died on Maunday-Thursday, and was interred at Ath-leathan.

Brian had at least one son, Aed mac Brian Ó hUiginn (died 1487). Others sons may have been Domnall mac Brian Ó hÚigínn and Cairbre mac Brian Ó hUiginn (died 1505).
