= Maol Sheachluinn na n-Uirsgéal Ó hUiginn =

Irish bardic poet active around 1400

Maol Sheachluinn na n-Uirsgéal Ó hÚigínn (fl. c. 1400) was an Irish bardic poet.

== Background ==
Ó hÚigínn was a member of a well-known Irish family of bards or poets, based in Connacht. His surviving works include:

- Foraire Uladh ar Aodh
- Do bhriseas bearnaidh ar Bhrian
- Each gan aradhain an fhearg

== See also ==
- Sean mac Fergail Óicc Ó hUiccinn, died 1490
- Philip Bocht Ó hUiginn
- Tadhg Mór Ó hUiginn
