= Tadhg Dall Ó hUiginn =

Irish poet (c. 1550 – c. 1591)

Tadhg Dall Ó hUiginn (c. 1550 – c.1591) was an Irish poet.

== Background ==
A well-known late-Gaelic era poet, Tadhg Dall Ó hUiginn was a member of a family of professional poets from north Connacht. His mother's name is unknown. His father was Mathghamhain mac Maolmhuire, a direct descendant of Tadg Óg Ó hUiginn (died 1448), prominent poet of his day. His brother, Maol Muire Ó hÚigínn, was a priest who became Archbishop of Tuam, yet also followed family tradition in composing poetry (little surviving). He died in 1590. Tadhg had lands at Doughrarane in Achonry, and Coolrecuil in Kilmactigue, among other parcels in County Sligo, where he served as a juror. The twentieth-century editor and translator of his works for the Irish Texts Society, Eleanor Knott, suggests that these were lands originally granted to his ancestors by the O'Conor Sligo family, who were the patrons of this bardic family.

That he was called by the soubriquet dall ('blind') suggests that Ó hUiginn's vision was poor or absent. However, the appellation was not necessarily literal, and may have alluded to some other perceived characteristic or event in his early life.

== Poetry ==
Ó hUiginn evidently enjoyed high status in his lifetime. This is reflected in the lords, powerful and influential leaders, to whom he addressed many of his poems. (Note: The lords and chiefs addressed in Ó hUiginn's poems include: Cú Chonnacht Mag Uidhir (died 1589); Patrick Plunkett, the 7th Baron Dunsany (died 1601); Aodh Mac Seáin Ó Broin (d. 1579); Aodh Mag Uidhir (died 1600); Cormac Ó hEadhra (died 1612); Brían na Múrtha Ó Ruairc (died 1591); Conn Ó Dónaill (died 1583); Aodh Ó Dónaill (died 1600); Turlough Luineach O'Neill (died 1595); Seaán mac Oliver Bourke, Lord of Mac William Íochtar (also called 'John Burke'; died 1580); Myler Burke (died 1586)) Further indication of his status among contemporaries and in the decades after, is the sizable number of his compositions that are found in important compilations of the time. The Book of O'Conor Don - compiled at Ostend in 1631 - has twenty-four poems ascribed to Ó hUigin; while the Ó Gadhra manuscript (RIA MS 23 F 16), collected in Brussels and Lille in 1655-1659, includes fifteen of his works.

A constant theme of his work is a very distinct sense of Irish nationalism, acutely aware of the political situation in late 16th-century Ireland. Irish sovereignty under threat from England features in several, along with restructuring invasion stories found in Lebor Gabala Erenn for the Norman-Irish, who were now heavily Gaelicised.

== Death ==
An inquest held at Ballymote in 1593 recorded that Tadhg Dall had died at Coolrecuil on the last day of March 1591. A chancery inquisition of 1617 provided further details, stating that members of the Ó hEadhra family of Cashel Carragh, Kilmacteige, were attainted in 1591 for "murdering one Teige Dall O Higgen [sic] his wife and childe in the year one thousand five hundred ninetee and one or thereabouts". Tadhg Dall apparently composed a satirical poem about six robbers, all members of the Ó hEadhra family. A later (1714) manuscript of the satire has a heading that suggests that members of the Ó hEadhra sept retaliated by cutting out his tongue before murdering him. Whatever the precise details of the attack were, Ó hUigin undoubtedly met a violent death.

== Descendants ==
Tadgh Dall had a daughter, Máire. His son, Tadg Óg Ó hÚigínn, who was nine years old when his father was killed by members of the Ó hEadhra sept, inherited his father's lands at Dooghorne in Achonry. Tadg Óg's grandson, Pól Ó hUiginn (c. 1628 - 1724) was a scholar who was ordained as a Catholic priest in 1668 in Rome. Returning to Ireland, he served as a parish priest, but by 1680 had converted to Protestantism. He was a preacher of Irish language sermons at the Trinity College Dublin Chapel, and later vicar for eight Church of Ireland parishes in County Tipperary until he died in 1724.

== Family tree ==
  Tadhg, d. 1315
  |
  |
  ?
  |
  |
  Tadhg, d. 1391 = Áine
                 |
  _______________|_________
  |                    |
  |                    |
  Fearghal Ruadh       Tadg Óg Ó hUiginn (died 1448)
                       |                   
                       |                    
                       |                     
              [some generations]        
                       |                
                       |
                       |                        
                    Brian Óge     
                       |                         
                       |                          
                   Maolhmuire                     
                       |
                       |___________________________
                       |                          |
                       |                          |
                  Mathghamhain                    Gilla Coluim, d. 1587.
                       |
 ______________________|_____________________________
 |                           |                      |
 |                           |                      | 
 Tadgh Dall, d. 1591   Maol Muire, d. 1590.  Tomultach Óg? 
 |
 |________________________________
 |                             |
 |                             |
 Tadg Óg Ó hUiginn, b. 1582.   Máire (d. 1591?)
 |
 |
 ?
 |
 |
 Pol, 1628? - 1724

== See also ==
- Tadhg Mór Ó hUiginn
- Maol Sheachluinn na n-Uirsgéal Ó hUiginn
