= Bernardo O'Higgins =

Chilean independence leader (1778–1842)

Bernardo O'Higgins LMCh
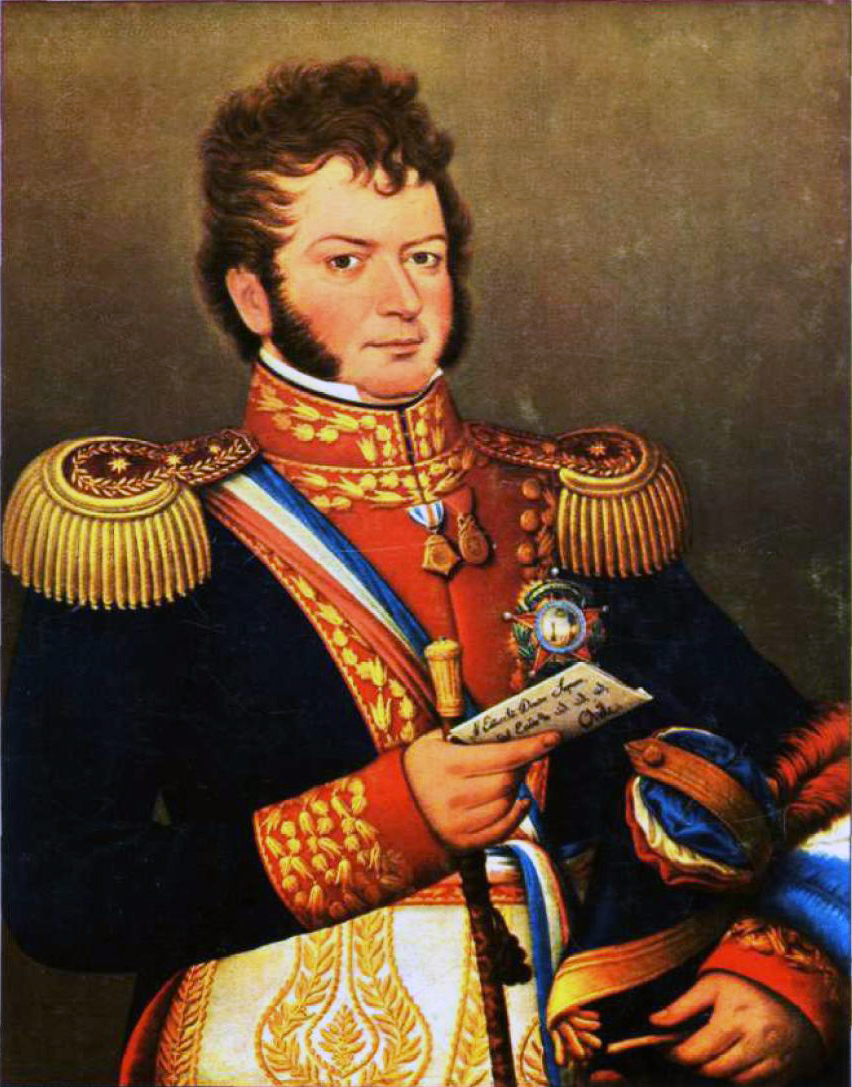
- Portrait by José Gil de Castro

Supreme Director of Chile
- In office 17 February 1817 – 27 January 1823
- Preceded by: José Miguel Carrera
- Succeeded by: Ramón Freire

Commander-in-Chief of the Chilean Army
- In office 27 April 1819 – 27 January 1823
- Preceded by: José de San Martín
- Succeeded by: Ramón Freire
- In office 27 November 1813 – 2 September 1814
- Preceded by: José Miguel Carrera
- Succeeded by: José Miguel Carrera

Personal details
- Born: 20 August 1778 Chillán, Kingdom of Chile
- Died: 24 October 1842 (aged 64) Lima, Peru
- Relations: Rosa Rodríguez y Riquelme (half-sister)
- Children: 2
- Parents: Ambrosio O'Higgins, 1st Marquess of Osorno (father); Isabel Riquelme (mother)
- Education: Royal College of San Carlos

Military service
- Allegiance: Chilean Army
- Rank: Captain General (Chilean Army); Brigadier (Río de la Plata); General officer (Gran Colombia); Grand marshal (Peru)
- Battles/wars: Chilean War of Independence; Patria Vieja campaign; Battle of San Carlos; Siege of Chillán; Battle of El Roble; Battle of El Quilo; Battle of Membrillar; Battle of Quechereguas; Battle of Las Tres Acequias; Battle of Rancagua; Patria Nueva; Battle of Chacabuco; Second Battle of Cancha Rayada; Battle of Maipú

Bernardo O'Higgins Riquelme (Spanish: [beɾˈnaɾðo oˈ(x)iɣins]; 20 August 1778 – 24 October 1842) was a Chilean military officer, statesman and a major leader of Chile's successful struggle for independence from the Spanish Empire. He was the second Supreme Director of Chile from 1817 to 1823, the first holder of the title to head a fully independent Chilean state, and is considered one of Chile's founding fathers.

Born in Chillán, O'Higgins was of Irish and Basque-Spanish descent and the illegitimate son of Ambrosio O'Higgins, 1st Marquess of Osorno, who would later become the Governor of Chile and subsequently Viceroy of Peru. While studying in London, he became acquainted with Francisco de Miranda, developed a sense of nationalist pride, and became a member of the revolutionary Lautaro Lodge. Returning to Chile in 1802 following his father's death, he inherited a large estate and settled down as a wealthy landowner.

In 1810, a national junta was established following the deposition of King Ferdinand VII of Spain by Napoleon. O'Higgins was elected to the first National Congress of Chile a year later. He soon became embroiled in a conflict with José Miguel Carrera, who espoused a more specifically Chilean brand of nationalism. Their divide ultimately contributed to O'Higgins' disastrous defeat at Rancagua at the hands of the Royalists, leading to the fall of the Patria Vieja.

Following the reassertion of Spanish rule, O'Higgins went into exile in the newly independent Argentina, where he met General José de San Martín and helped assemble the Army of the Andes. In 1817, San Martín and O'Higgins crossed the Andes into Chile and achieved a decisive victory over the royalists at the Battle of Chacabuco. They then re-entered Santiago, where O'Higgins was proclaimed Supreme Director after San Martín declined the post. A year later, Chile formally proclaimed itself an independent republic, and independence was all but assured with the patriot victory at Maipú.

As Supreme Director, O'Higgins sought to create working institutions for the newly independent nation and improve its agriculture. He founded the modern Chilean Navy, and supported San Martín's forces in the liberation of Peru. His push for radical reforms on the other hand antagonized the aristocracy, the church and ultimately the business community. Widespread discontent forced his resignation in 1823, after which he went into exile in Peru, where he died in 1842.

== Early life ==
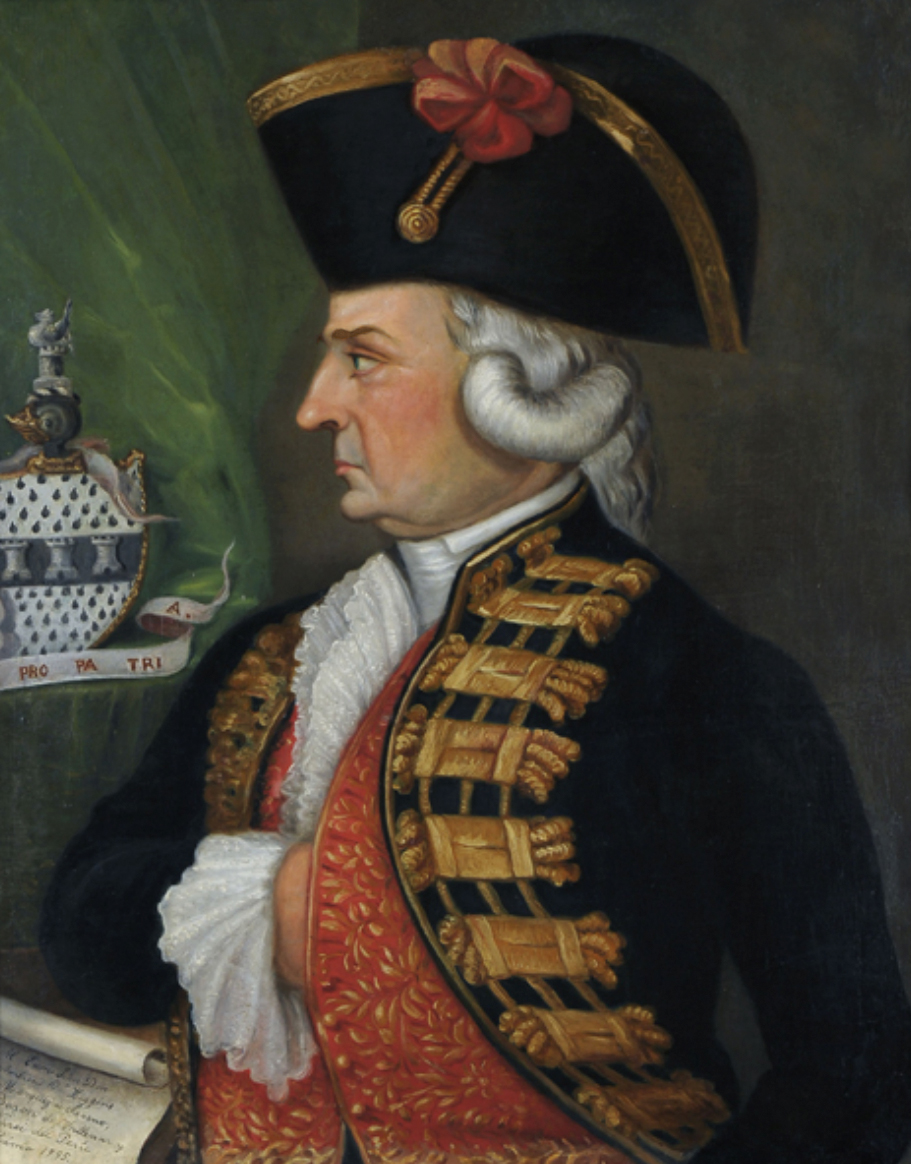
Ambrosio O'Higgins, Bernardo's father, whom he never met

Bernardo O'Higgins, a member of the O'Higgins family, was born in the Chilean city of Chillán in 1778, the illegitimate son of Ambrosio O'Higgins, 1st Marquis of Osorno, a Spanish officer born in County Sligo, Ireland, who became governor of Chile and later viceroy of Peru. His mother was Isabel Riquelme, a prominent local; the daughter of Don Simón Riquelme y Goycolea, a member of the Chillán Cabildo, or town council.

O'Higgins spent his early years with his mother's family in central-southern Chile and was never acknowledged by his father, and later he lived with the Albano family, who were his father's commercial partners, in Talca. From age 10 to 12, he studied under Franciscan teachers.

At age 15, O'Higgins was sent to Lima by his father. He had a distant relationship with Ambrosio, who supported him financially and was concerned with his education, but the two never met in person. At the time of his son's birth, Ambrosio was only a junior military officer. Two years later, Isabel married Don Félix Rodríguez, a friend of her father. O'Higgins used his mother's surname until the death of his father in 1801.

Bernardo's father continued his professional rise and became Viceroy of Peru; at seventeen Bernardo O'Higgins was sent to London to complete his studies. There, studying history and the arts, O'Higgins became acquainted with American ideas of independence and developed a sense of nationalist pride. He met Francisco de Miranda, a Venezuelan idealist and believer in independence, and joined a non-masonic lodge (the Lautaro Lodge) dedicated to achieving the independence of Latin America. Despite some claims of connection between the Lautaro Lodge and the freemasons, these two were not related. Notably, the Lautaro Lodge members were strong supporters of the Catholic Church, while Freemasons were stiffly against the Church, and they opposed members of the Lautaro Lodge.

In 1798 O'Higgins went to Spain from Great Britain, his return to the Americas delayed by the French Revolutionary Wars. His father died in 1801, leaving O'Higgins a large piece of land, the Hacienda Las Canteras, near the Chilean city of Los Ángeles. O'Higgins returned to Chile in 1802, adopted his biological father's surname, and began life as a gentleman farmer. In 1806, he was appointed to the cabildo as the representative of Laja. In 1808 Napoleon took control of Spain, triggering a sequence of events in South America. In Chile, the commercial and political elite decided to form an autonomous government to rule in the name of the imprisoned king Ferdinand VII; this was to be one of the first in a number of steps toward national independence, in which O'Higgins would play a leading role.

== Role in Chilean independence movement ==
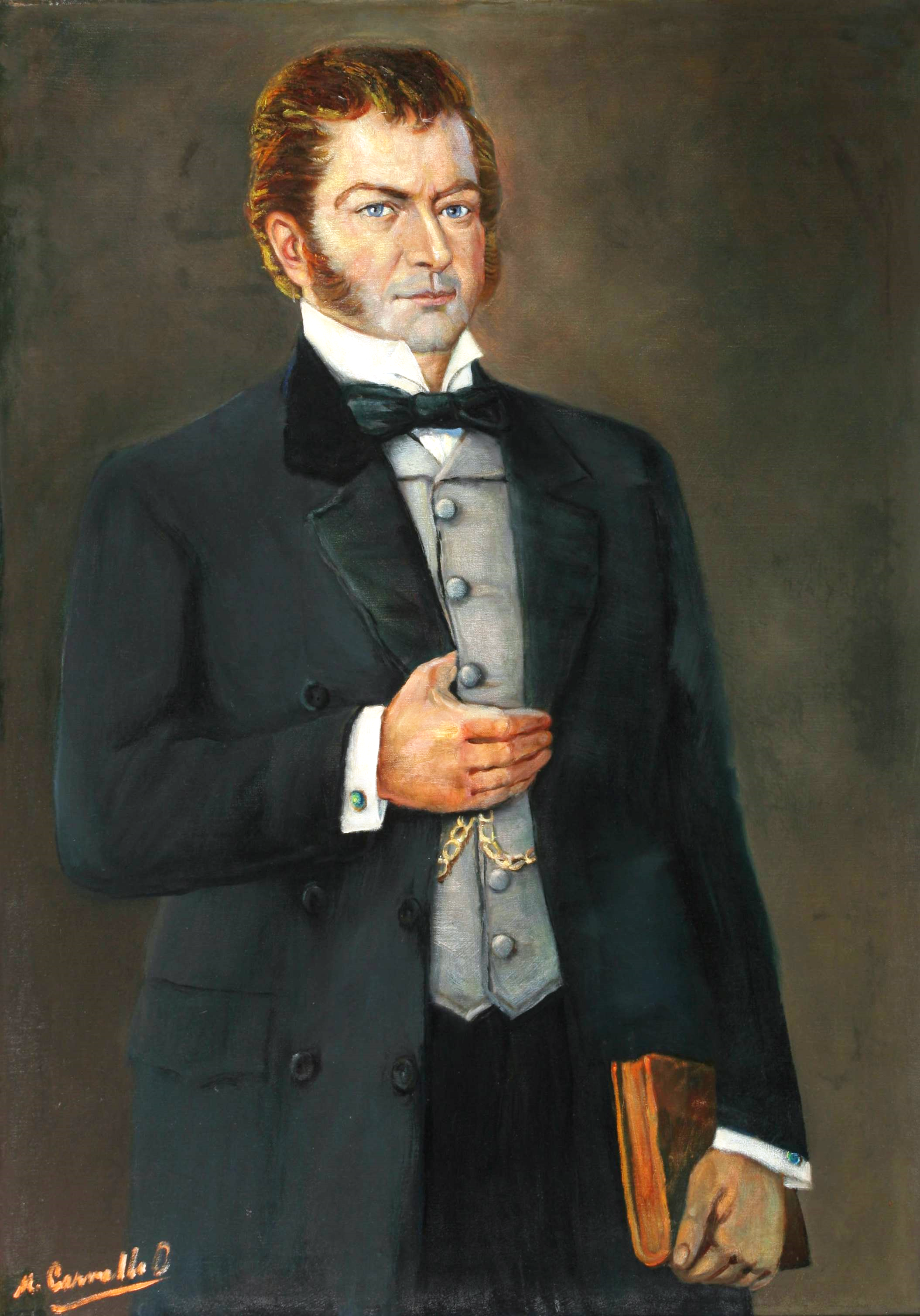
Portrait of O'Higgins in the National Congress Library of Chile.

On 18 September 1810, O'Higgins joined the revolt against the now French-dominated Spanish government. The criollo leaders in Chile did not support Joseph Bonaparte's rule in Spain, and a limited self-government under the Government Junta of Chile was created, with the aim of restoring the legitimate Spanish throne. This date is now recognized as Chile's Independence Day. O'Higgins was a close friend of Juan Martínez de Rozas, an old friend of his father, and one of the more radical leaders. O'Higgins strongly recommended that a national congress be created, and was elected a deputy to the first National Congress of Chile in 1811 as a representative of the Laja district. Tensions between the royalist and increasingly pro-independence factions, to which O'Higgins remained attached as a junior member, continued to grow.

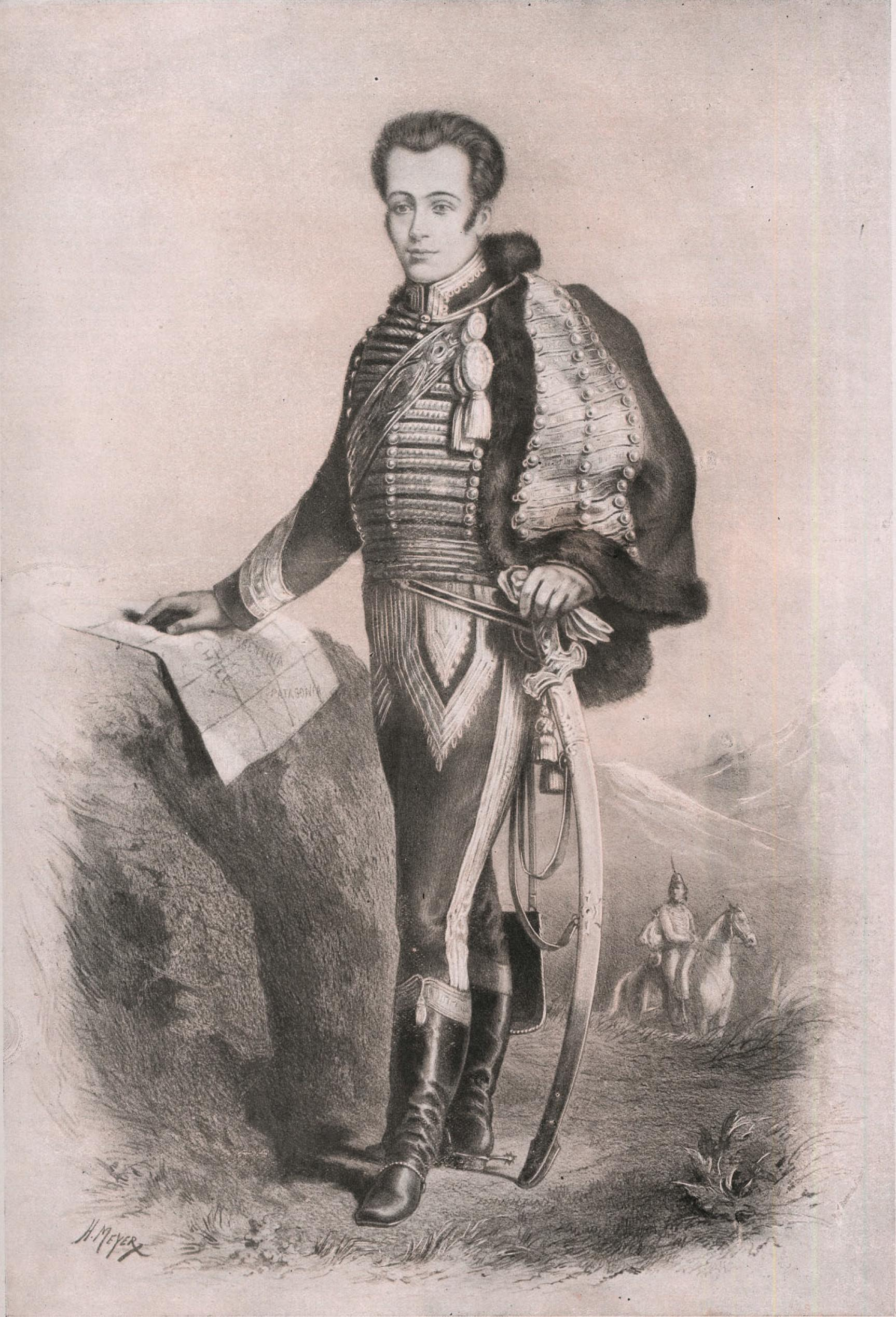
José Miguel Carrera, with whom O'Higgins had an ongoing feud

The anti-Royalist camp in Chile was deeply split along lines of patronage and personality, political beliefs, and geography (between the rival regional groupings of Santiago and Concepción). The Carrera family had already seized power several times in different coups, and supported a specifically Chilean nationalism, as opposed to the broader Latin American focus of the Lautaro Lodge grouping, which included O'Higgins and the Argentine José de San Martín. José Miguel Carrera, the most prominent member of the Carrera family, enjoyed a power base in Santiago; that of de Rozas, and later O'Higgins, lay in Concepción.

As a result, O'Higgins was to find himself increasingly in political and military competition with Carrera—although early on, O'Higgins was nowhere near as prominent as his later rival. De Rozas initially appointed O'Higgins to a minor military position in 1812, possibly because of his illegitimate origins, poor health, or lack of military training. Much of O'Higgins' early military knowledge stemmed from Juan Mackenna, an immigrant of Irish descent and a former client of Ambrosio's, whose advice centred mainly on the use of cavalry. In 1813, when the Spanish government made its first attempt to reconquer Chile—sending an expedition led by Brigadier Antonio Pareja—Carrera, as a former national leader and now Commander in Chief of the Army, was by far the more prominent figure of the two, and a natural choice to lead the military resistance.

O'Higgins was back on his estates in Laja, having retired from the Army the previous year due to poor health, when news came of the invasion. O'Higgins mobilised his local militia and marched to Concepcion, before moving on to Talca, meeting up with Carrera, who was to take command of the new army. Carrera sent O'Higgins to cut the Spanish off at Linares; O'Higgins' victory there resulted in his promotion to colonel. The unsuccessful Siege of Chillan followed, where O'Higgins produced a brave but unspectacular performance; however, as commander, Carrera took most of the blame for the defeat, weakening his prestige with the Junta back in Santiago. O'Higgins continued to campaign against the royalists, fighting with a reckless courage that would make him famous. In October, fighting at the Battle of El Roble under Carrera, O'Higgins took effective command at a crucial moment and gave one of his more famous orders:

Lads! Live with honor, or die with glory! He who is brave, follow me!

Despite being injured, O'Higgins went on to pursue the royalist forces from the field. The Junta in Santiago reassigned command of the army from Carrera, who had retreated during the battle, to O'Higgins, who then appointed Juan Mackenna as commandant-general. Carrera was subsequently captured and imprisoned by the royalist forces; in his absence, in May 1814 O'Higgins supported the Treaty of Lircay, which promised a halt to the fighting. Once released, however, Carrera violently opposed both O'Higgins' new role and the treaty, overthrowing the Junta in a coup in July 1814 and immediately exiling Mackenna.

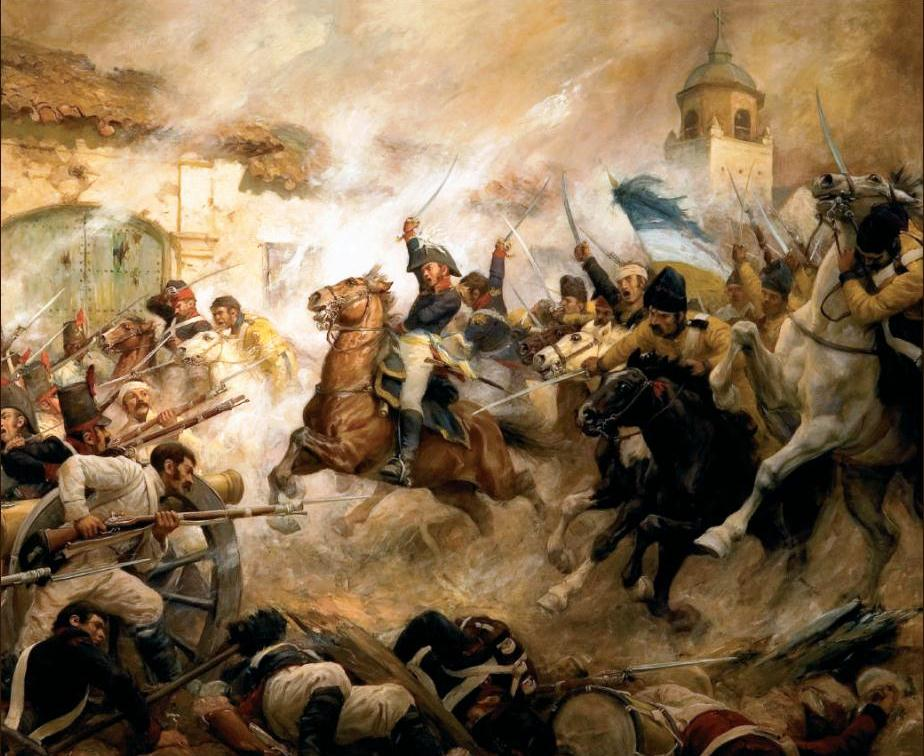
O'Higgins' Charge at the Battle of Rancagua

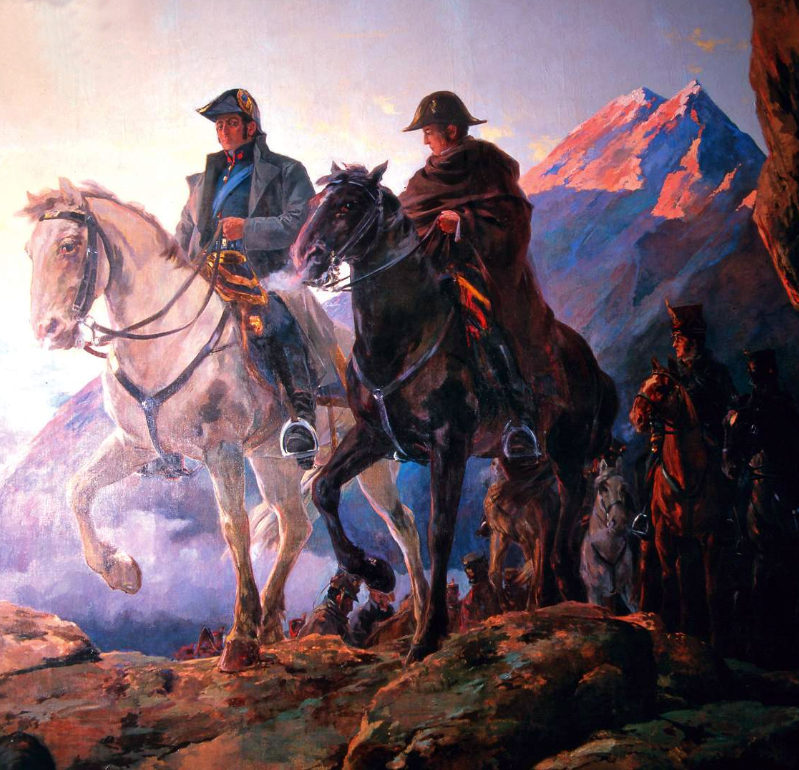
Generals José de San Martín (left) and Bernardo O'Higgins (right) during the crossing of the Andes.

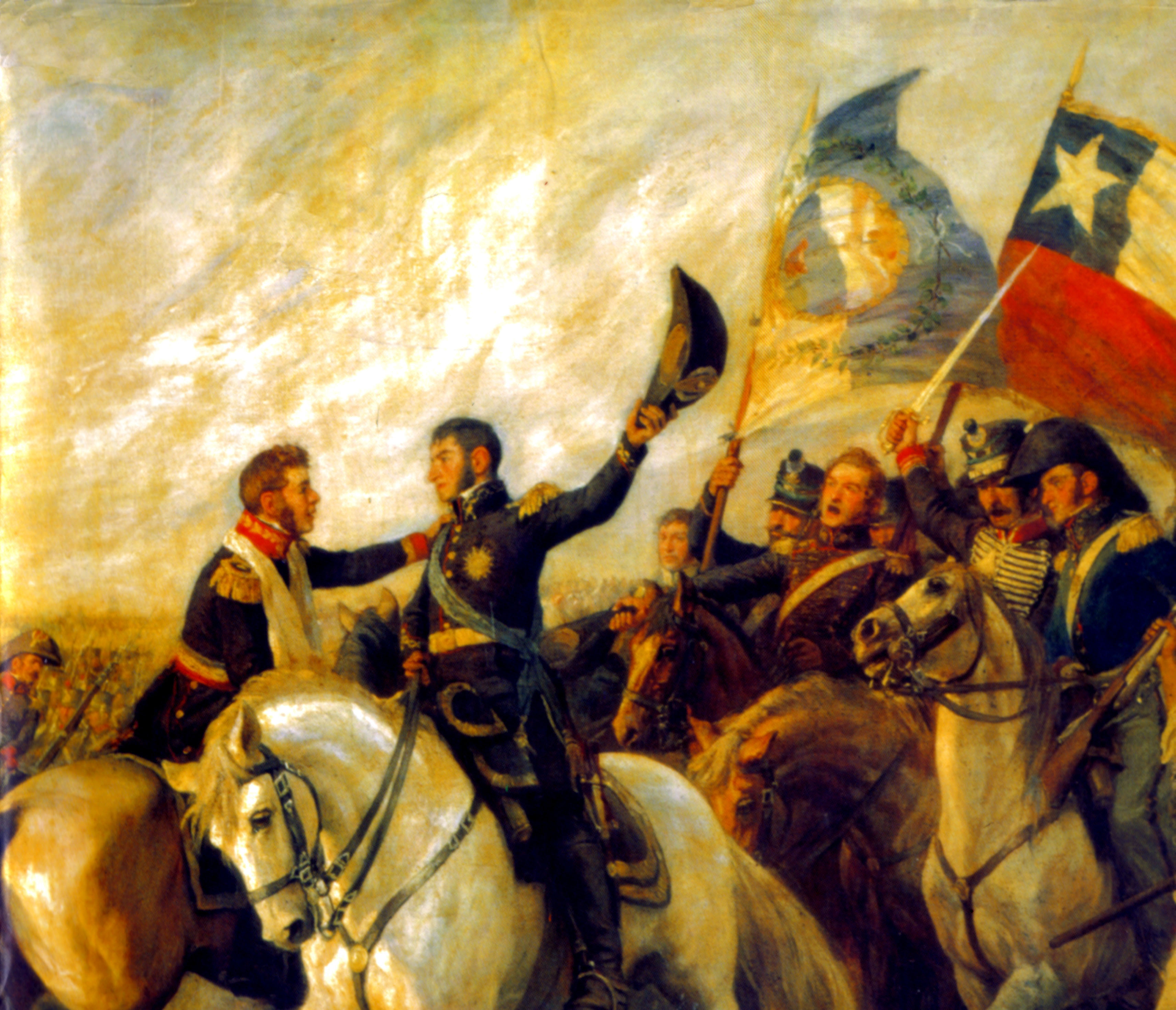
O'Higgins meets Jose San Martin at the Battle of Maipu 1818.

O'Higgins turned to focus on Carrera, and their forces met at the battle of Las Tres Acequias, where Carrera's brother Luis inflicted a modest defeat on O'Higgins. Further conflict was postponed by the news that the royalists had decided to ignore the recent treaty, and were threatening Concepción under the leadership of General Mariano Osorio. Carrera and O'Higgins decided to reunite the army and face the common threat. Carrera's plan was to draw the Spaniards to the Angostura del Paine, while O'Higgins preferred the town of Rancagua. They decided to make a stand at the Angostura de Paine, a gorge that formed an easily defended bottleneck. At the last hour, however, O'Higgins instead garrisoned the nationalist forces at the main square of Rancagua. Carrera did not arrive with reinforcements, and O'Higgins and his forces were promptly surrounded in October. After an entire day of fighting at the battle of Rancagua, the Spanish commander, Mariano Osorio, was victorious—but O'Higgins managed to break out with a few of his men, issuing the command:

Those who can ride, ride! We will break through the enemy!

Like Carrera and other nationalists, O'Higgins retreated to Argentina with the survivors and remained there for three years while the royalists were in control. Mackenna, still a key supporter, was killed by Luis Carrera in a duel in 1814, deepening the feud.

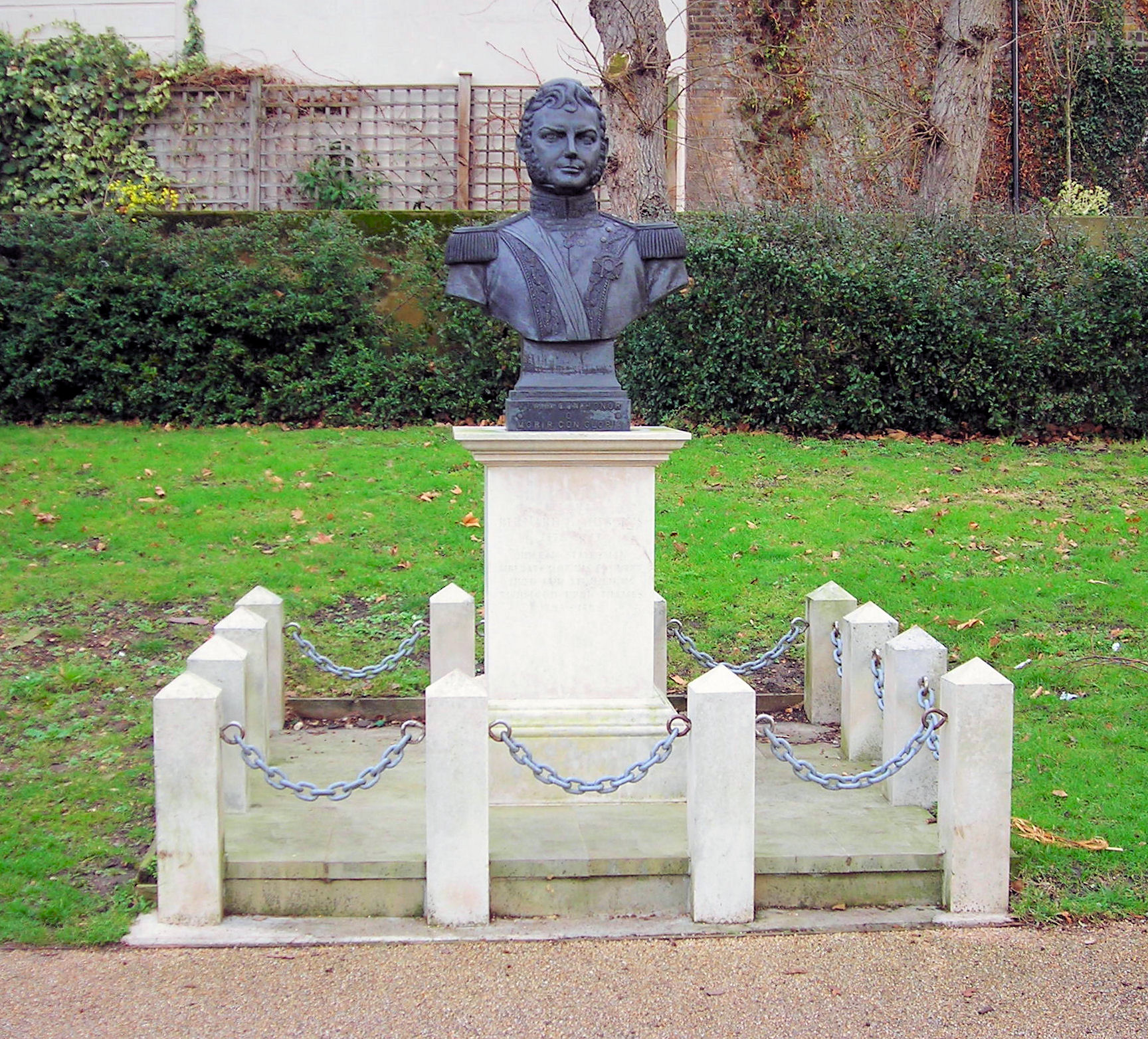
Bust of O' Higgins at Richmond, London

== O'Higgins as Supreme Director ==
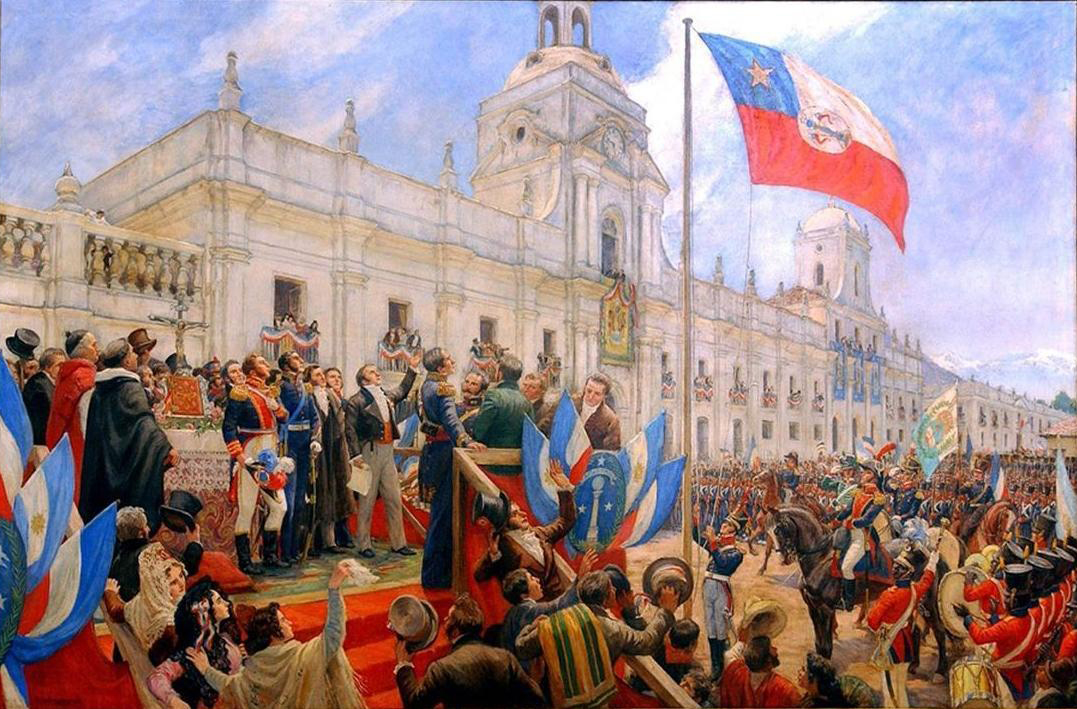
Bernardo O'Higgins, erroneously depicted attending the declaration of Chilean independence.

While in exile, O'Higgins met the Argentine General José de San Martín, a fellow member of the Lautaro Lodge, and together the men returned to Chile in 1817 to defeat the royalists. Initially, the campaign went well, with the two commanders achieving a victory at the battle of Chacabuco. San Martín sent his troops down the mountain starting at midnight on 11 February to prepare for an attack at dawn. As the attack commenced, his troops were much closer to the Spanish than anticipated, and they fought hard and heroically. Argentine General Miguel Estanislao Soler's troops had to go down a tiny path that proved long and arduous and took longer than expected. General O'Higgins—supposedly seeing his homeland and overcome with passion—defied the plan of attack and charged along with his 1,500 troops. What happened during this theatre of the battle is fiercely debated. O'Higgins claimed that the Spanish stopped their retreat and started advancing towards his troops. He said that, if he were to lead his men back up the narrow path and retreat, they would have been massacred one by one. San Martín saw O'Higgins' early advancement and ordered Soler to charge the Spanish flank, which took the pressure off O'Higgins and allowed his troops to stand their ground.

The ensuing firefight continued into the afternoon, and the tides turned for the Patriots as Soler captured a key Spanish artillery point. At this point, the Spanish set up a defensive square around the Chacabuco Ranch. O'Higgins charged the centre of the Spanish position, and Soler got into place behind the Spanish forces, effectively cutting off any chance of retreat. O'Higgins and his men overwhelmed the Spanish troops, who attempted to retreat, but Soler's men cut off their retreat and pushed towards the ranch. Hand-to-hand combat ensued in and around the ranch, until every Spanish soldier was dead or taken captive. Five hundred Spanish soldiers were killed, and 600 were taken captive. The Patriot forces lost 12 men in the battle, but an additional 120 died of their wounds.

The Second Battle of Cancha Rayada in 1818, however, was a victory for the Royalists, and it was not until the Battle of Maipú that ultimate victory was assured. San Martín was initially offered the position of power in the newly free Chile, but he declined, in order to continue the fight for independence in the rest of South America. O'Higgins accepted the position instead and became the leader of an independent Chile. He was granted dictatorial powers as Supreme Director on 16 February 1817. On 12 February 1818, Chile proclaimed itself an independent republic.

Throughout the war with the royalists, O'Higgins had engaged in an ongoing feud with José Miguel Carrera. After their retreat in 1814, O'Higgins had fared much better than Carrera, who found little support forthcoming from San Martín, O'Higgins' political ally. Carrera was imprisoned to prevent his involvement in Chilean affairs; after his escape, he ended up taking the winning side in the Argentine Federalist war, helping to defeat the directorate in 1820.

Marching south to attack O'Higgins, now ruler of Chile, Carrera was arrested by supporters of O'Higgins and executed under questionable circumstances in 1821; his two brothers had already been killed by royalist forces in the preceding years, bringing the long-running feud to an end. The argument as to the relative contribution of these two great Chilean independence leaders, however, has continued up to the modern day, and O'Higgins' decision not to intervene to prevent the execution coloured many Chileans' views of his reign.

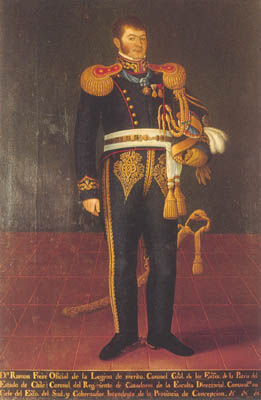
Ramon Freire, Bernardo O'Higgins' closest ally, who was ultimately to depose him.

For six years, O'Higgins was a largely successful leader, and his government initially functioned well. Within Chile, O'Higgins established markets, courts, colleges, libraries, hospitals, and cemeteries, and began important improvements in agriculture. He undertook various military reforms. He founded the Chilean Military Academy in 1817, aiming to professionalise the officer corps. O'Higgins remained concerned about the threat of invasion, and had declared after the battle of Chacabuco that "this victory and another hundred shall be of no significance if we do not gain control of the sea". Alongside the Military Academy, he founded the modern Chilean Navy under the command of the Scottish officer Lord Cochrane, establishing the First Chilean Navy Squadron, the Academy for Young Midshipmen (the predecessor of the current Naval Academy), and the Chilean Marine Corps. O'Higgins continued in his desire to see independence across Latin America, utilising his new forces to support San Martín, sending the Liberating expedition to Perú. Bernardo O'Higgins once planned to expand Chile by liberating the Philippines from Spain and incorporating the islands. In this regard he tasked the Scottish naval officer, Lord Thomas Cochrane, in a letter dated 12 November 1821, expressing his plan to conquer Guayaquil, the Galapagos Islands, and the Philippines. There were preparations, but the plan didn't push through because O'Higgins was exiled. Nevertheless, in the middle of the 19th century, there was another plan by Chilean officials to also assist in the Philippine Revolution and the Philippine-American War by sending an armada across the Pacific. However, the plan also did not come to fruition.

In time, however, O'Higgins began to alienate important political groupings within the still-fragile Chilean nation. O'Higgins' proposed radical and liberal reforms, such as the establishment of democracy and the abolition of titles of nobility, were resisted by the powerful large landowners. He offended the church in Chile early on—in particular, the Bishop of Santiago, Jose Rodriguez Zorrilla. Having offended the aristocracy and the church, he also lost the support of the businesspeople, his last semi-powerful ally within the country. The government became bankrupt, forcing O'Higgins to send Antonio José de Irisarri to the United Kingdom to negotiate a £1 million loan—Chile's first foreign debt—whilst a massive earthquake in central Chile added more difficulty for the ruler.

In 1822, O'Higgins established a new "controversial" constitution, which many regarded as a desperate attempt to hang on to power. The deaths of his political enemies, including Carrera and Manuel Rodríguez, returned to haunt him, with some accusing him of abusing state power. The provinces increasingly viewed him as centralising power to an excessive degree.

O'Higgins was deposed by a conservative coup on 28 January 1823. Chile's new dictator, Ramón Freire, formerly O'Higgins' "closest ally", had slowly turned against O'Higgins in the preceding years. Freire had fought under O'Higgins at the Battle of Maipú, was promoted to colonel for his services to the independence, and was finally named Intendant of Concepción. His friendship with O'Higgins started to crack by degrees, however, until in 1822 he resigned his position in disagreement. His name became a rallying point for those discontented with O'Higgins, but the two of them never came to an armed conflict. O'Higgins' abdication was typically dramatic: baring his chest, he offered up his life should his accusers demand it of him. In return, the junta declared they held nothing against O'Higgins, and saluted him. O'Higgins was made governor of Concepción, an appointment which did not last long: it was time for him to leave Chile.

== Peruvian independence and O'Higgins' final years ==
After being deposed, O'Higgins embarked from the port of Valparaíso in July 1823, in the British corvette Fly, never to see Chile again. Originally destined for Ireland, while he was passing through Peru he was strongly encouraged by Simón Bolívar to join the nationalist effort there. Bolívar's government granted O'Higgins the Hacienda de Cuiva and the Hacienda Montalván in San Vicente de Cañete, near Lima. O'Higgins lived in exile for the rest of his life accompanied by his illegitimate son, Pedro Demetrio O'Higgins (1817–1868), his mother, and his half-sister, Rosa Rodríguez y Riquelme. According to a 2001 documentary, O'Higgins also had a daughter, Petronila (born circa 1809) by Patricia Rodríguez.

O'Higgins travelled to join Bolívar's army in its final liberation of Peru, but upon arrival, he found that Bolívar did not intend to give him a command—instead appointing him a general of Gran Colombia and making him a special court-martial judge for Chilean volunteers. Making his way back to Lima, O'Higgins heard of Sucre's victory at the Battle of Ayacucho. He returned to Bolívar for the victory celebrations but as a civilian. "Señor", he toasted, addressing Bolívar, "America is free. From now on General O'Higgins does not exist; I am only Bernardo O'Higgins, a private citizen. After Ayacucho, my American mission is over."

When Andrés de Santa Cruz became head of the Peru-Bolivian Confederation in 1836, O'Higgins endorsed his integrationist policies, and wrote a letter of support to him the following year when the Confederation came under attack from the Chilean forces of Diego Portales—ultimately offering to act as a mediator in the conflict. With the rise of Agustín Gamarra, O'Higgins found himself out of favour in Peru. Meanwhile, the Chilean government had begun to rehabilitate O'Higgins, reappointing him to his old rank of captain-general in the Chilean Army.

From exile, O'Higgins argued for the establishment of a Chilean settlement in the Strait of Magellan in his correspondence with the Minister of State. No action was taken on O'Higgins' arguments, but in 1842 Chile began to organise an expedition to settle the strait following a request by an American to be allowed to establish a tug boat service in the area.

In 1842, the National Congress of Chile finally voted to allow O'Higgins to return to Chile. After travelling to Callao to embark for Chile, however, O'Higgins began to succumb to cardiac problems and was too weak to travel. His doctor ordered him to return to Lima, where on 24 October 1842, aged 64, O'Higgins died.

== Legacy ==
After his death, his remains were first buried in Peru, before being repatriated to Chile in 1869. O'Higgins had wished to be buried in the city of Concepción, but this was never to be. For a long time, they remained in a marble coffin in the Cementerio General de Santiago, and in 1979 his remains were transferred by Augusto Pinochet to the Altar de la Patria, in front of the Palacio de La Moneda. In 2004, his body was temporarily stored at the Chilean Military School during the building of the Plaza de la Ciudadanía, before being finally laid to rest in the new underground Crypt of the Liberator.

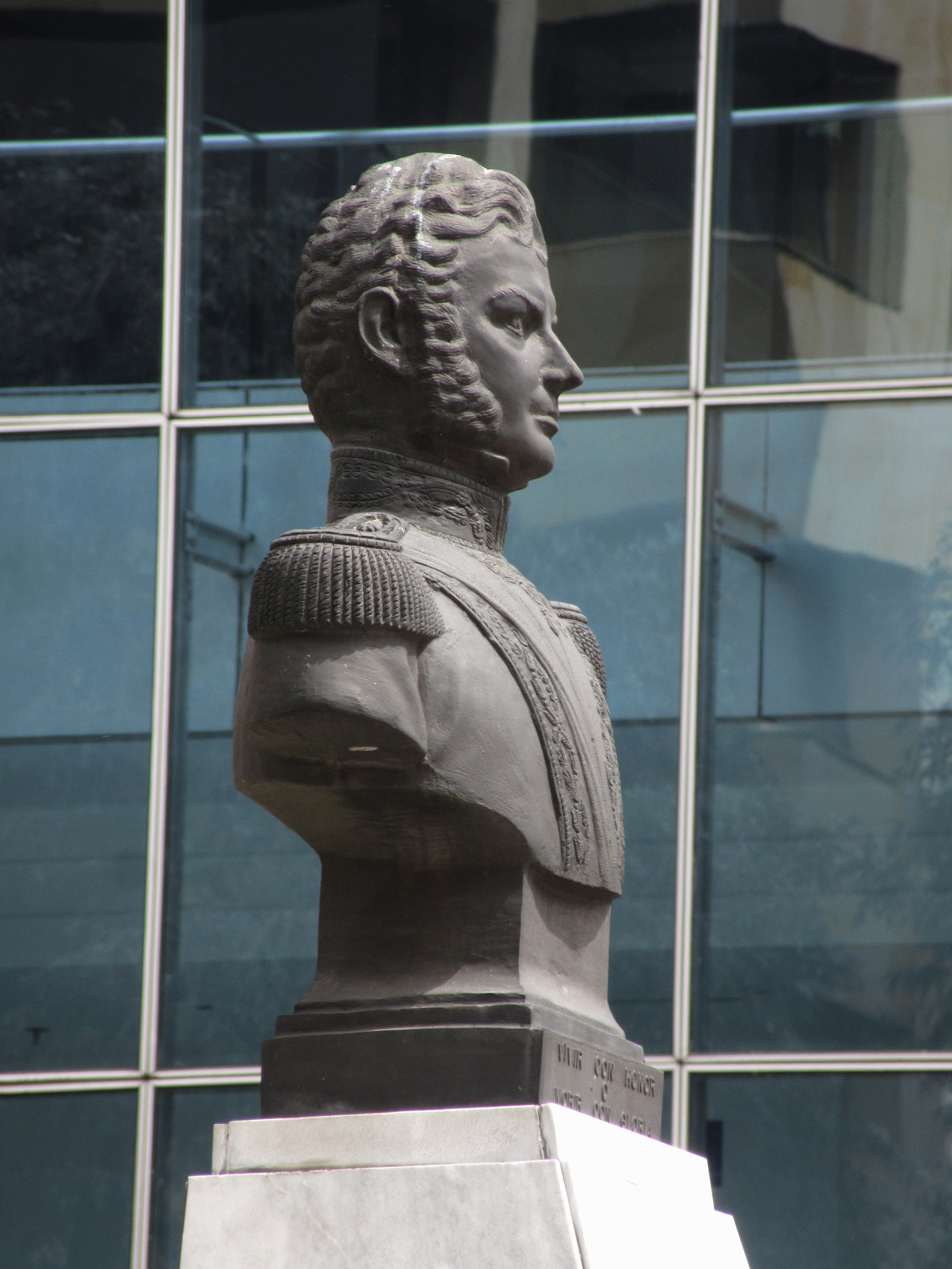
Bust of O'Higgins in Bogotá

O'Higgins is widely commemorated today, both in Chile and beyond. One of the administrative regions of Chile was named Libertador General Bernardo O'Higgins Region in his honour, as were other placenames such as the village of Villa O'Higgins. The main thoroughfare of the Chilean capital, Santiago, is Avenida Libertador General Bernardo O'Higgins. There is also the Bernardo O'Higgins National Park. In the town of San Vicente de Cañete, situated in the Lima Region of Peru, a park and street are named after him. A statue of O'Higgins is located in a park in Guatemala City, the capital of Guatemala.

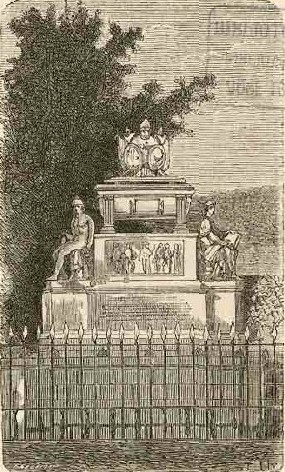
Mausoleum of O'Higgins in Cementerio General de Santiago, pictured by Recaredo Santos Tornero in Chile Ilustrado, in 1872

There is a bust of O'Higgins in O'Higgins Square by the bridge in Richmond, south-west London. Each year the borough's mayor is joined by members of the Chilean Embassy for a ceremony, and a wreath is placed there. A blue plaque was erected in his honour at Clarence House in Richmond, where he lived while studying in London.

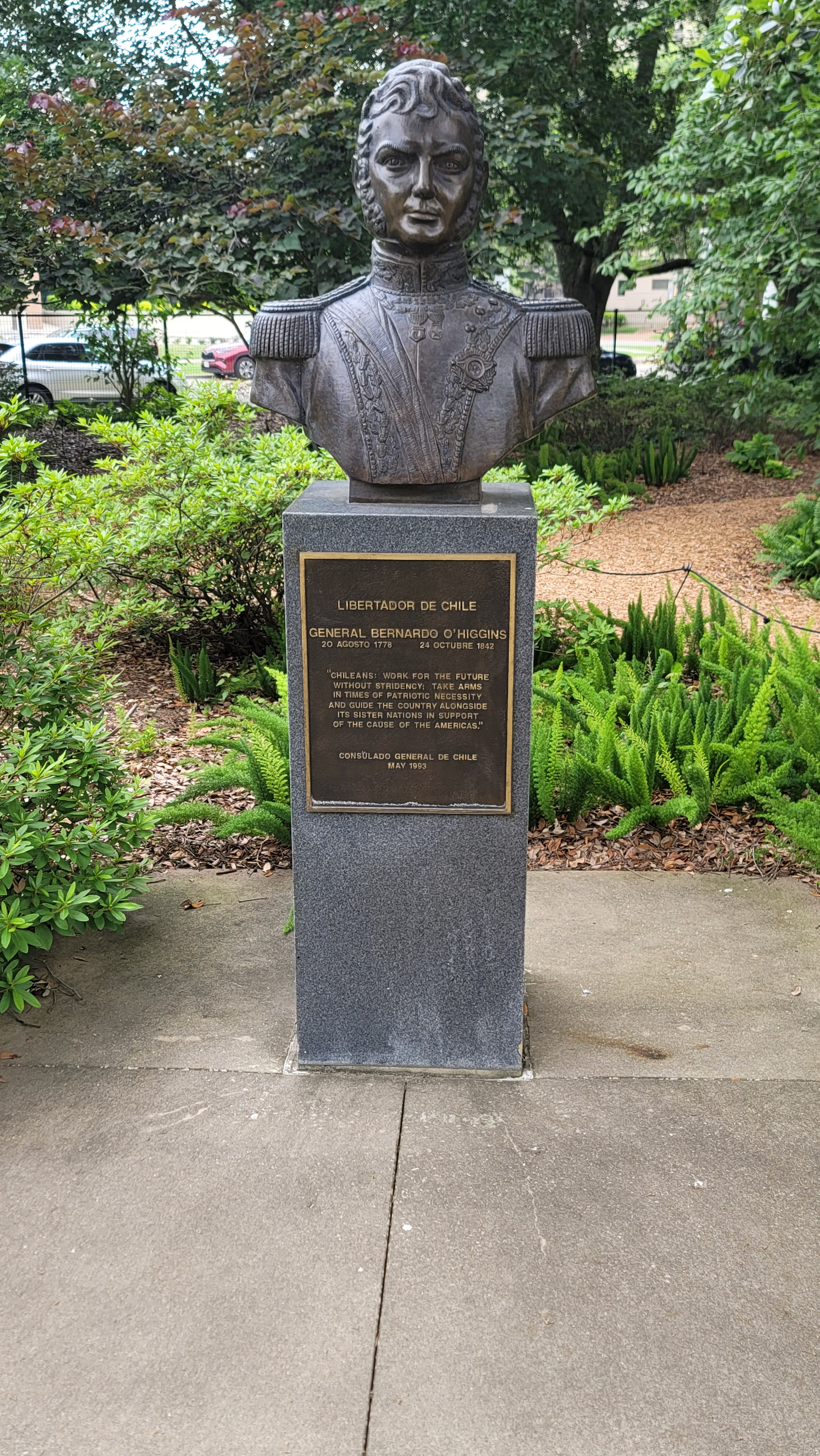
Bernardo O'Higgins bust in Houston, TX

A 1992 bronze sculpture of O'Higgins was executed by Julian Martinez, the same sculptor responsible for the nearby statue of Benito Juárez. Previously, the bust was installed at Hermann Park's International Sculpture Garden. It rests on a granite pedestal and was acquired by the City of Houston through FAMAE/Arcomet in 1992.

There is also a bust in his honour in Merrion Square in Dublin, Ireland and in the Garavogue River Walkway in Sligo, Ireland, and a sculpture near Central Railway Station in Plaza Iberoamericana, near 58 Chalmers St, Sydney. In Buenos Aires, there is a large statue of him in the centre of the Plaza República de Chile, and several localities in Argentina are named after him. A plaque has also been erected in Cádiz, Spain, in the Plaza de Candelaria, where he resided for four years. In 2005, a bust was erected "To the Liberator of Chile" by the Chilean Embassy in the Parque Morazan in San José, Costa Rica. There is a bust of Bernardo O'Higgins on a marble plinth on the east side of Avenida da Liberdade in downtown Lisbon, Portugal. A statue of Bernardo O'Higgins in the city of Concepción was destroyed during the 2010 earthquake in Chile.

In 1949, American composer Henry Cowell composed an opera on the life of O'Higgins titled O'Higgins of Chile. The libretto was written by Elizabeth Lyttleton, but the work was never orchestrated nor staged.

In 1955, the football team O'Higgins F.C. was founded, named after him.

The Order of Bernardo O'Higgins, Chile's highest award for foreign citizens, is named in honour of O'Higgins.

The Chilean Navy has named several vessels in his honour. They include a frigate (1816), a corvette (1866), an armoured cruiser (1897–1933), a light cruiser (1951–1992), and a submarine (2003–present).

The SS Bernardo O'Higgins, one of the standard Liberty ships (#2168), was laid down on 23 September 1943 and launched on 13 October 1943. It was scrapped in 1959.

The Chilean Base General Bernardo O'Higgins Riquelme research station in Antarctica is named in his honour. It is located on the northernmost part of the continent.

On 28 October 2010, An Post (the Irish Post Office) and CorreosChile (the Chilean Post Office) issued 82c and $500 se-tenant stamps to commemorate the bicentenary of the beginning of the struggle for Chilean Independence. The stamps honour two men with Irish backgrounds, who played a crucial role in the quest for Chile's liberation, Bernardo O'Higgins and John MacKenna.

== See also ==
- Bust of Bernardo O'Higgins (Houston)
- Bust of Bernardo O'Higgins (Washington, D.C.)
- Bernardo O'Higgins Monument
- Francisco de Miranda
- History of Chile
- Irish Chileans
- Irish military diaspora
- Irish regiments
- José de San Martín
- José Miguel Carrera
- Juan Albano Pereira Márquez
- Juan de la Cruz y Bernardotte
- Juan Mackenna
- List of famous alumni of UNMSM.
- O'Higgins Pioche
- Simón Bolívar
- Talca Foundation

Political offices
Preceded by None	Member of Government Junta; 1811	Succeeded by None
Preceded by José Miguel Carrera	Supreme Director of Chile; 1817–1823	Succeeded by Ramón Freire
Military offices
Preceded by José de San Martín	Army Commander-in-chief; 1819–1823	Succeeded by Ramón Freire
Preceded by José Miguel Carrera	Army Commander-in-chief; 1813–1814	Succeeded by José Miguel Carrera
