= 1814 in Chile =

- Decades: 1790s; 1800s; 1810s; 1820s; 1830s
- See also: Other events in 1814 · Timeline of Chilean history

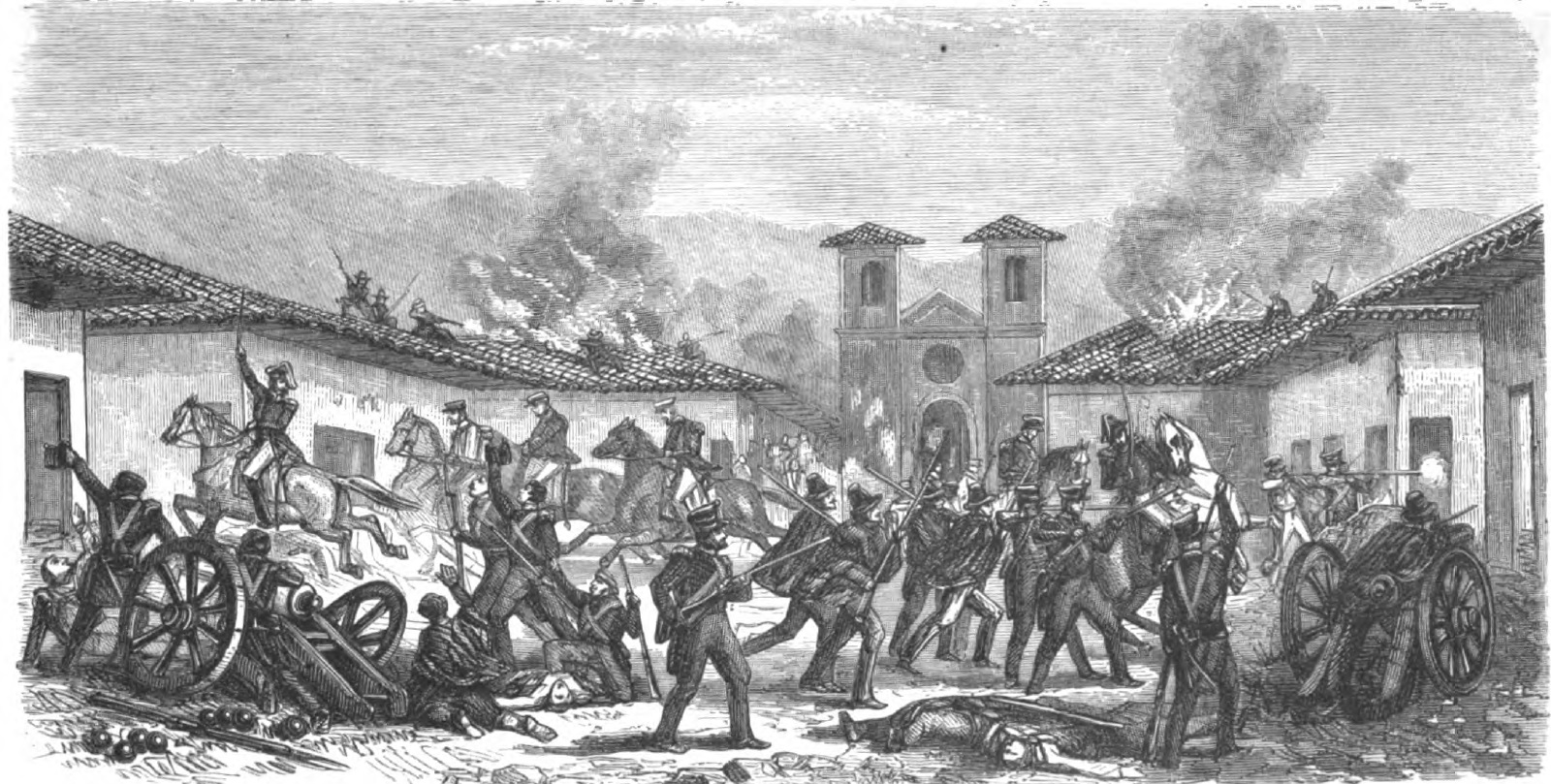
The Battle of Rancagua

Events from the year 1814 in Chile

== Events ==
=== January ===
- January 1: Brigadier Gabino Gaínza and his military expedition sail from Callao.
- January 31: The Royal Expedition arrives to Chile.

=== February ===
- February 1: José Miguel Carrera recognizes Bernardo O'Higgins as the Commander-in-chief of the Chilean Army.
- February 17: Proclamation of the Constitutional Rules.
- February 23: Battle of Cucha-Cucha

=== March ===
- March 3: First Battle of Talca. Patriot Colonel Carlos Spano dies in the defense of Talca from the Royalist forces under the command of Ildefonso Elorreaga.
- March 6: José Miguel Carrera and his brother Luis Carrera are captured by a Royalist squadron under Clemente de Lantaño.
- March 7: Francisco de la Lastra is elected as the first Supreme Director of Chile.
- March 19: Battle of El Quilo.
- March 20: Battle of El Membrillar.
- March 28: In the Battle of Valparaiso, the British frigate HMS Phoebe and sloop HMS Cherub capture the American frigate USS Essex and sloop USS Essex Junior.
- March 29: First Battle of Cancha Rayada. The patriot troops under Manuel Blanco Encalada are completely routed.

=== April ===
- April 8: Battle of Quechereguas.

=== May ===
- May 3: Both sides in conflict agree to a truce and sign the Treaty of Lircay.
- May 12: José Miguel Carrera and his brother Luis Carrera escape from prison.

=== July ===
- July 19: Viceroy of Peru José Fernando de Abascal rejects the Treaty of Lircay, and dispatches a new military expedition under the command of Brigadier Mariano Osorio.
- July 23: José Miguel Carrera starts his second (third for some authorities) dictatorship by deposing Supreme Director Francisco de la Lastra via a coup of State
- July 29: An open meeting of the leading citizens takes place in Talca which declares itself against the Carrera brothers.

=== August ===
- August 12: Brigadier Mariano Osorio and his expedition arrive to Talcahuano.
- August 18: Brigadier Mariano Osorio arrives to Chillan and takes command of the Royal Army. Brigadier Gabino Gaínza is sent back to Lima to be court martialled.
- August 20: Battle of Las Tres Acequias, between the supporters of José Miguel Carrera under the command of his brother Luis Carrera, and those who oppose him, under the command of Colonel Bernardo O'Higgins. O'Higgins is defeated and agrees to submit himself to Carrera.

=== September ===
- September 9: José Miguel Carrera is named Commander-in-chief of the Chilean Army

=== October ===
- October 2: Disaster of Rancagua. Royalist forces defeat the patriot troops under Colonel Bernardo O'Higgins.
- October 5: The Royalist forces enter Santiago. Begins the mass exodus of patriots towards Mendoza.

=== November ===
- November 1: The first group of patriot prisoners are sent to the Juan Fernández Islands.

== Deaths ==
- March 3: Colonel Carlos Spano, during the First Battle of Talca. (b. 1773)
- November 21: Juan Mackenna, after a duel with Luis Carrera. (b. 1771)
