= 1818 in Chile =

- Decades: 1790s; 1800s; 1810s; 1820s; 1830s
- See also: Other events of 1818; Timeline of Chilean history

The following lists events that happened during 1818 in Chile.

== Incumbents ==
Supreme Director of Chile: Bernardo O'Higgins

Royal Governor of Chile: Mariano Osorio (4 January-5 April)

== Events ==
=== February ===
- 12 February - The Chilean Declaration of Independence is approved by Bernardo O' Higgins.

=== March ===
- 15 March - Battle of Quechereguas
- 16 March - Second Battle of Cancha Rayada
- 19 March - Battle of Talca

=== April ===
- 5 April - Battle of Maipú
- 27 April - Naval Battle of Valparaiso

=== October ===
- 19 October - The Spanish frigate Maria Isabel is captured by a Chilean squadron commanded by Manuel Blanco Encalada.
- 23 October - 1818 Chilean constitutional referendum

=== December ===
- 11 December - Thomas Cochrane, 10th Earl of Dundonald takes command of the Chilean Navy.

== Births ==
- 24 April - Juan Esteban Rodríguez Segura (d. 1901)

== Deaths ==
- 5 April - Santiago Bueras
- 5 April - Manuel María de Toro, 3rd Count of la Conquista (b. 1798)
- 8 April - Luis Carrera (b. 1791)
- 26 May - Manuel Rodríguez Erdoíza (b. 1785)
- 17 December - Fernando Márquez de la Plata (b. 1740)
