= 1813 in Chile =

- Decades: 1790s; 1800s; 1810s; 1820s; 1830s
- See also: Other events in 1813 · Timeline of Chilean history

The following lists events that happened during 1813 in Chile.

== Incumbents ==
Royal Governor of Chile (in opposition): José Antonio Pareja (-21 May), Juan Francisco Sánchez (21 May-)

President of the Provisional Government Junta: José Miguel Carrera Verdugo (-8 April), Patriot President of the Superior Junta: Francisco Antonio Pérez (12 April-23 August), Patriot, José Miguel Infante (23 August-), Patriot

== Events ==
=== April ===
- 27 April - Battle of Yerbas Buenas

=== May ===
- 15 May - Battle of San Carlos (1813)

=== June ===
- 8 June - The Spanish frigate Thomas is captured by the Patriots.

=== July ===
- 27 July–August 10 - Siege of Chillán

=== August ===
- 3 August - Battle of Maipon
- 10 August - The Instituto Nacional General José Miguel Carrera, Chile's oldest school, is established.
- 17 August - Battle of Quirihue
- 23 August - Battle of Cauquenes

=== October ===
- 17 October - Battle of El Roble

== Deaths ==
- 3 March - Juan Martínez de Rozas (b. 1758)
- 21 May - José Antonio Pareja (b. 1757)
