= 1812 in Chile =

- Decades: 1790s; 1800s; 1810s; 1820s; 1830s
- See also: Other events in 1812 · Timeline of Chilean history

The following lists events that happened during 1812 in Chile.

== Incumbents ==
Royal Governor of Chile (in opposition): José Antonio Pareja (12 December-)

Supreme Provisional Authority: José Miguel Carrera (-January 8), Patriot

President of the Provisional Government Junta: José Miguel Carrera (January 8-April 8), Patriot, José Santiago Portales (April 8-August 6), Patriot, Pedro José Prado Jaraquemada (August 6-December 6), Patriot, José Miguel Carrera Verdugo (December 6-), Patriot

== Events ==
=== February ===
- 13 February - The Aurora de Chile prints its first issue.

=== October ===
- 27 October - The Chilean constitutional referendum, 1812 is held.

=== November ===
- 10 November - The Senate of Chile first meets.

== Births ==
=== September ===
- September 12 – Carmen Quiroga de Urmeneta, philanthropist (d. 1897)

=== Date unknown ===
- Vicente Quesada (d. 1877)
