= 1819 in Chile =

- Decades: 1790s; 1800s; 1810s; 1820s; 1830s
- See also: Other events of 1819; Timeline of Chilean history

The following lists events that happened during 1819 in Chile.

== Incumbents ==
Supreme Director of Chile: Bernardo O'Higgins

== Events ==
=== February ===
- 23 February - Battle of Mesamávida

=== March ===
- 1–10 March - Siege of Los Angeles

=== May ===
- 1 May - Battle of Caralí

=== September ===
- 19 September - Battle of Quilmo

=== November ===
- 1 November - Battle of Tritalco
- 20 November - Battle of Hualqui

=== December ===
- 7 December - Battle of Píleo
- 10 December - Battle of El Avellano
- 19 December - Battle of Yumbel
- 29 December - Battle of San Pedro

== Births ==
- 19 April - Hermógenes Irisarri (d. 1886)

== Deaths ==
- Date unknown - Ignacio de la Carrera
