= 1826 in Chile =

- Decades: 1800s; 1810s; 1820s; 1830s; 1840s
- See also: Other events of 1826; Timeline of Chilean history

The following lists events that happened during 1826 in Chile.

== Incumbents ==
Supreme Director of Chile: Ramón Freire (-9 July)

President of Chile: Manuel Blanco Encalada (9 July-9 September), Agustín Eyzaguirre (9 September-)

== Events ==
=== July ===
- 8 July - Chilean presidential election, 1826
- 9 July - Ramon Freire resigns, handing over power to Manuel Blanco Encalada.

=== September ===
- 9 September - Manuel Blanco Encalada resigns, handing over power to Agustín Eyzaguirre.

== Births ==
- 2 June - Erasmo Escala (d. 1884)

== Deaths ==
- March - José Cortés de Madariaga (b. 1766)
