= National referendums in Chile =

There have been seven national referendums in Chile since 1925.

== List of referendums ==
| Year | Referendum | Turnout | Yes | No | Neither | Result | |
|---|---|---|---|---|---|---|---|
| 1812 | Adoption of a provisional political constitution | | | | | Approve | |
| 1817 | Independence proposal | | | | | Approve | |
| 1818 | Adoption of a provisional political constitution | | | | | Approve | |
| 1925 | Adoption of a new political constitution | 45.4% | 94.8% | 4.1% | 1.2% | Approve | |
| Year | Referendum | Turnout | Yes | No | Null | Blank | Result |
| 1978 | Legitimacy of Gen. Augusto Pinochet's dictatorship | ^{a} | 78.6% | 21.4% | 4.6% | | Approve |
| 1980 | Adoption of a new political constitution | ^{a} | 69.0% | 31.0% | 2.8% | 1.3% | Approve |
| 1988 | Continuance of Pinochet's rule | 97.5% | 44.0% | 56.0% | 1.3% | 1.0% | Reject |
| 1989 | Constitutional reforms | 93.7% | 91.3% | 8.7% | 4.6% | 1.5% | Approve |
| 2020 | On whether a new constitution should be drafted | 51.0% | 78.3% | 21.7% | 0.4% | 0.2% | Approve |
| Year | Referendum | Turnout | MCC | CC | Null | Blank | Result |
| 2020 | On what kind of body should write the new constitution | 51.0% | 21.0% | 79.0% | 3.4% | 1.6% | Constitutional Convention |
| Year | Referendum | Turnout | Yes | No | Null | Blank | Result |
| 2022 | Adoption of a proposed constitution | 85.8% | 38.1% | 61.9% | 1.5% | 0.6% | Reject |
| 2023 | Adoption of a proposed constitution | | | | | | Reject |

^{a} There was no electoral roll for this referendum.
Note: The percentages used in the "Yes", "No" and "Neither" columns are over the total of valid votes in each referendum. The percentages used in the "Null" and "Blank" columns are over the total votes cast in each referendum.

== Current legislation ==
The current 1980 constitution provides for binding referendums only in the case that a constitutional reform passed by Congress is completely vetoed by the President and then re-approved by Congress by a two-thirds majority of each chamber. In such occurrence the President has the authority to either sign the reform into law or call for a referendum. To date, the President has not exercised such power.
