= 1817 in Chile =

- Decades: 1790s; 1800s; 1810s; 1820s; 1830s
- See also: Other events of 1817; Timeline of Chilean history

The following lists events that happened during 1817 in Chile.

== Incumbents ==
Royal Governor of Chile: Francisco Marcó del Pont (-February 12)

Supreme Director of Chile: Bernardo O'Higgins (February 16-)

== Events ==
=== January ===
- 19 January-13 February - Crossing of the Andes
- 24 January - Action of Picheuta

=== February ===
- 2 February - Battle of Guardia Vieja
- 12 February - Battle of Salala
- 12 February - The Battle of Chacabuco is fought, resulting in a Spanish defeat and the Patriot capture of Santiago.
- 12 February - Spanish Royal Governor of Chile Francisco Marcó del Pont is captured by Patriot forces after the Battle of Chacabuco.
- 16 February - Bernardo O'Higgins is granted dictatorial powers.

=== April ===
- 4 April - Battle of Curapalihue

=== May ===
- 5 May - Battle of Cerro Gavilan

=== June ===
- 1 June - The Legion of Merit of Chile is established by Bernardo O'Higgins to recognize personal merit.
- 2 June - The Ministry of Finance is established.

=== October ===
- 18 October - The Flag of Chile is adopted.

=== November ===
- 15 November - Chilean independence referendum, 1817
- 20 November - O'Higgins authorizes privateers to engage as commerce raiders against the Spanish.

=== December ===
- 5-6 December - Battle of Talcahuano

== Births ==
- 2 February - Salvador Sanfuentes (d. 1860)
- 13 June - Antonio Varas (d. 1886)
- 21 July - Francisco Astaburuaga Cienfuegos (d. 1892)_

== Deaths ==
- 12 February - Ildefonso Elorreaga (b. 1782)
- 17 April - Vicente San Bruno
