= Antonio José de Irisarri =

Guatemalan statesman, journalist and politician

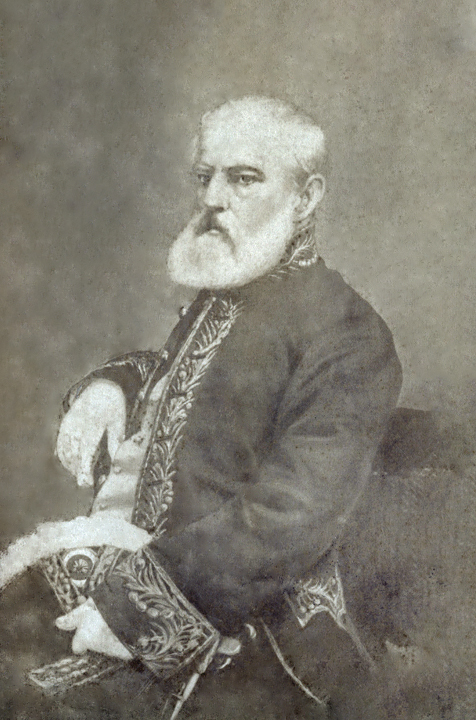

Interim Supreme Director of Chile
- In office March 7, 1814 – March 14, 1814
- Preceded by: Position created
- Succeeded by: Francisco de la Lastra

Personal details
- Born: February 7, 1786 Guatemala City, Guatemala
- Died: June 10, 1868 (aged 82) Brooklyn, New York
- Spouse: Mercedes Trucíos

Antonio José de Irisarri Alonso (Latin American Spanish: [anˈtonjo xoˈse ðejɾiˈsari]; February 7, 1786 – June 10, 1868) was a Guatemalan statesman, journalist, and politician who served as Interim Supreme Director of Chile in 1814. He is considered one of the fathers of Chilean journalism together with Fr. Camilo Henríquez.

Irisarri was born in Guatemala City, the son of Juan Bautista de Irisarri and of María de la Paz Alonso. He studied in his native city and in Europe, from whence he was recalled to his home after the death of his father in 1805. In 1809 he visited Chile, and having married Mercedes Trucíos y Larraín, an heiress there, took up his residence in that country and joined with enthusiasm the movement for independence in 1810. He had charge of important public offices during the struggle for liberty, including the command of the National guard and the civil and military government of the province of Santiago, and from March 7 to 14, 1814, he was temporarily in charge of the supreme direction of the nation.

In 1818 he was appointed Minister of Government and Foreign Affairs by Bernardo O'Higgins, and in October of the same year he went to Buenos Aires as minister. At the end of 1819 he was sent to Europe to negotiate the recognition of Chilean Independence by England and France (which he was not able to obtain.) While at London he negotiated a loan of £1,000,000 (the first foreign debt of Chile.) He was sent to Central America in 1827 as minister for Chile, and in 1837 as plenipotentiary to Peru and private adviser to Admiral Manuel Blanco during the War of the Confederation. After the Chilean army was forced to sign the Treaty of Paucarpata on November 17, 1837, the scandal was gigantic. Irisarri refused to return to Chile, was tried in absentia for high treason, and sentence to death. Irisarri wisely never returned to Chile.

He was minister of Guatemala and Salvador to Ecuador from 1839 till 1845, and in 1846–1848 to Colombia, but resigned, and went to Curaçao in 1849, and in 1850 to the United States, where he resided till his death. The governments of Guatemala and Salvador appointed him, in 1855, their minister to Washington, and for a long time he was dean of the diplomatic corps. Irisarri continued his literary work in the United States, and was generally esteemed for his knowledge, genial character, and polished manners.

Irisarri was chief editor of the Semanario Republicano de Chile in Santiago in 1813; of El Duende in the same city in 1818; of El Censor Americano in London in 1820; of El Guatemalteco in Guatemala in 1828; of "La Verdad desnuda," "La Balanza," and "El Correo" in Guayaquil in 1839–1843; of "La Concordia" in Quito in 1844–1845; of" Nosotros," "Orden y Libertad," and "El Cristiano Errante" in Bogota in 1846–1847; and of "El Revisor" in Curaçao in 1849, the publication of which he continued in New York. He also published "La defensa de la historia critica del asesinato cometido en la persona del Gran Mariseal de Ayacucho" (Quito, 1845); "Memoria biografica del Arzobispo Mosquera" (Bogota, 1848); a collection of his satirical poems, a novel, "Cuestiones Filologicas," and several pamphlets. He died in Brooklyn, New York, on June 10, 1868.

In 1973 Guatemala honoured him with the institution of an "Order of Antonio José de Irisarri".

== Additional information ==
=== See also ===
- History of Chile
- Chilean Independence
- War of the Confederation
- Hermógenes Irisarri Trucíos

Political offices
Preceded by Position created	Interim Supreme Director of Chile; 1814	Succeeded by Francisco de la Lastra
Preceded by Miguel Zañartu	Minister of Government and Foreign Affairs; 1818	Succeeded by Joaquín Echeverría
