= 1826 Chilean presidential election =

- July 8, 1826

39 members of the National Congress 20 votes needed to win
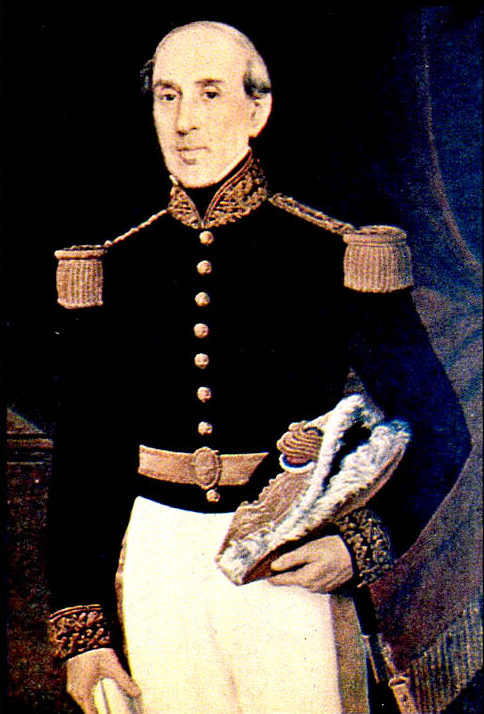

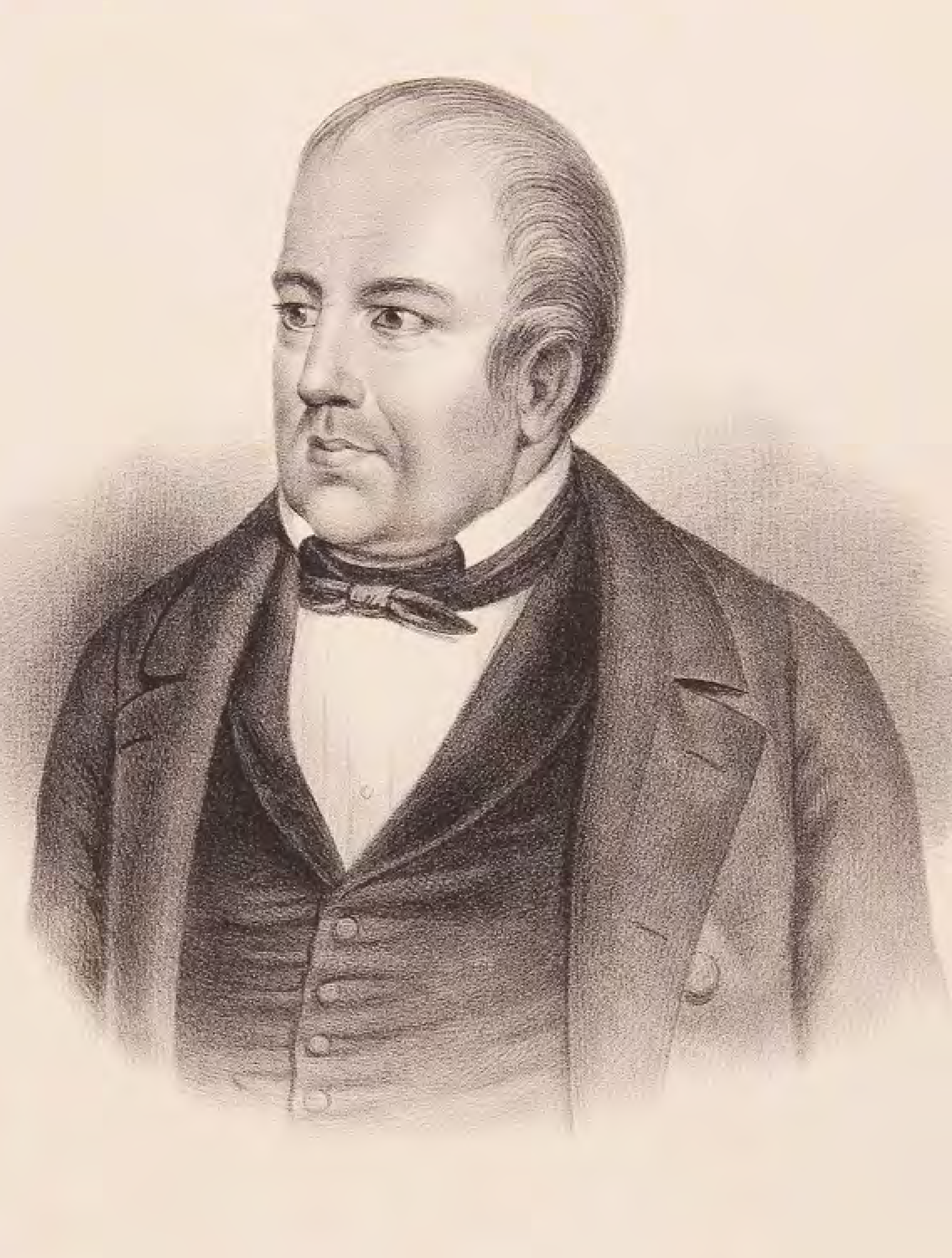
| Nominee | Manuel Blanco Encalada | José Miguel Infante |
| Party | Independent | Federalista |
| electoral vote | 22 | 15 |
| Percentage | 57.89% | 39.47% |
Supreme Director before election
Ramón Freire
Elected President (provisional)
Manuel Blanco Encalada

Presidential elections were held in Chile on July 8, 1826. The National Congress of Chile voted to elect the first President of the Republic of Chile.

The election was called after the resignation of General Ramón Freire from the post of supreme director on July 7, 1826. On the nights of the seventh and eighth, the Congress decided that the supreme chief of state would carry the title of President of the Republic, and that a vice president would be elected to replace him in case of illness, etc.

On July 8, the Congress elected Admiral Manuel Blanco Encalada as president and Agustín Eyzaguirre as vice president.

== Results ==
=== President ===
| Candidate | Party | Votes | % |
|---|---|---|---|
| Manuel Blanco Encalada | Independent | 22 | 57.89 |
| José Miguel Infante | Federalista | 15 | 39.47 |
| Casiano Arce Vásquez | Independent | 1 | 2.63 |
| Total | | 38 | 100.00 |
| Blank votes | | 1 | 2.56 |
| Total votes | | 39 | – |
Source: Delgado, Letelier

=== Vice president ===
| Candidate | First round | | Second round | |
| Candidate | Votes | % | Votes | % |
|---|---|---|---|---|
| Agustín Eyzaguirre | 12 | 31.58 | 22 | 57.89 |
| Francisco Antonio Pinto | 8 | 21.05 | 15 | 39.47 |
| José Silvestre Lazo | 6 | 15.79 | 1 | 2.63 |
| José Manuel Borgoño | 5 | 13.16 | | |
| Diego José Benavente | 3 | 7.89 | | |
| Francisco Ruiz-Tagle | 2 | 5.26 | | |
| Enrique Campino | 1 | 2.63 | | |
| Manuel Pio de Silva Cienfuegos | 1 | 2.63 | | |
| Total | 38 | 100.00 | 38 | 100.00 |
| Blank votes | | | 1 | 2.56 |
| Total votes | | | 39 | – |
Source: Delgado, Letelier
