= Blanco Encalada =

Blanco Encalda may refer to:

- Manuel Blanco Encalada - first president of Chile
- See also Chilean ship Blanco Encalada for several ships of the Chilean Navy named "Blanco Encalada"
