= 1824 in Chile =

- Decades: 1800s; 1810s; 1820s; 1830s; 1840s
- See also: Other events of 1824; Timeline of Chilean history

The following lists events that happened during 1824 in Chile.

== Incumbents ==
Supreme Director of Chile: Ramón Freire

== Events ==
=== April ===
- 1 April - Battle of Mocopulli

== Births ==
- date unknown - Francisco Bascuñán Guerrero (d. 1873)

== Deaths ==
- date unknown - Juan Crisóstomo Lafinur
