= Pileus =

Pileus may refer to:

- Pileus (hat), a brimless cap
- Pileus (mycology), the "cap" of a mushroom
- Pileus (meteorology), a cloud formation
- the crown of a bird's head
- the scales on the top of lizard and snake heads

== See also ==
- Jewish hat, pileus cornutus
- Plis (hat)
- Battle of Pileu (1819)
