= 1825 in Chile =

- Decades: 1800s; 1810s; 1820s; 1830s; 1840s
- See also: Other events of 1825; Timeline of Chilean history

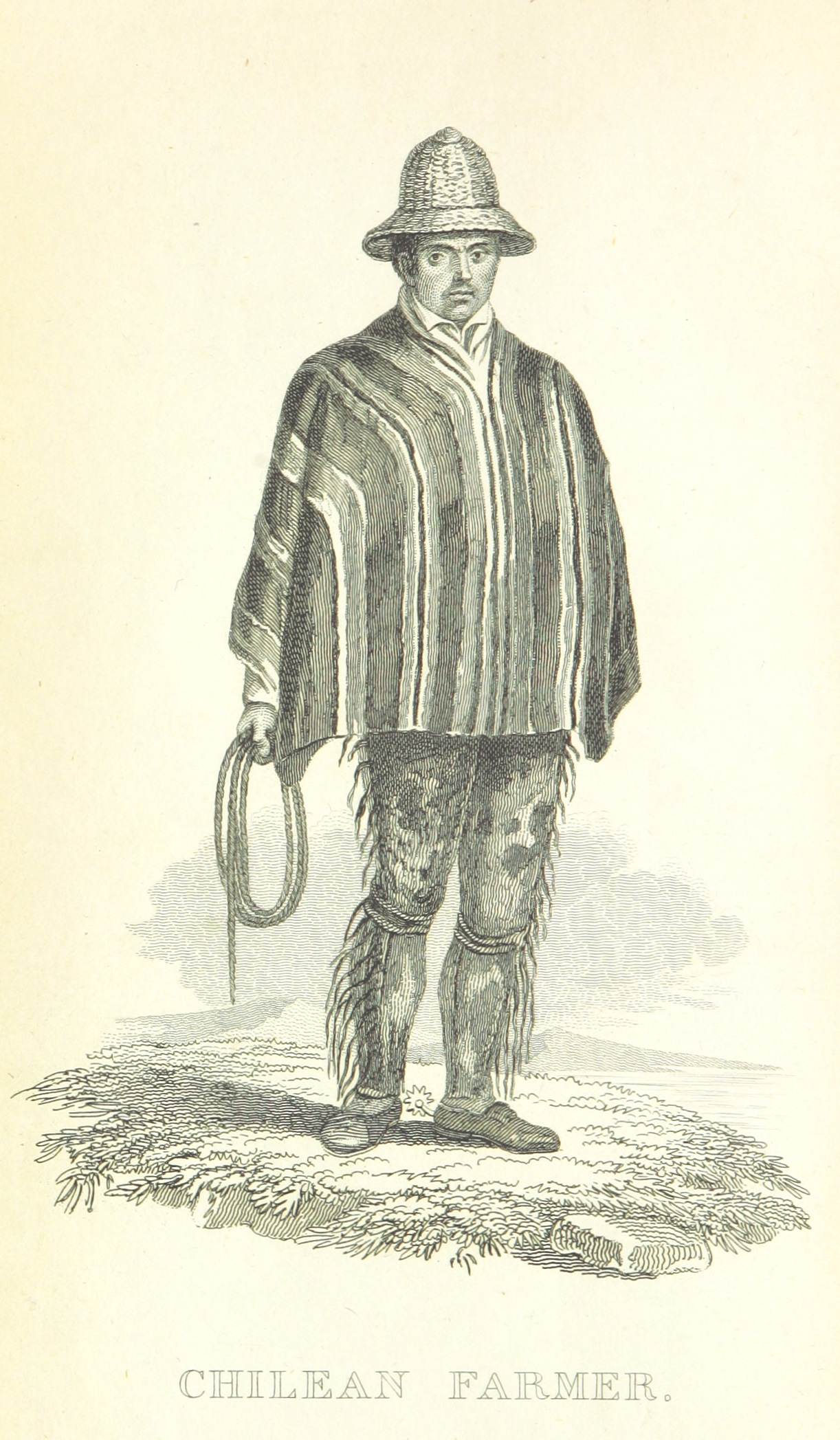
Chilean Farmer.jpg

The following lists events that happened during 1825 in Chile.

== Incumbents ==
Supreme Director of Chile: Ramón Freire

== Events ==
=== January ===
- 7 January - Parliament of Tapihue

== Births ==
- date unknown - Juan Williams Rebolledo (d. 1910)
- 15 March - Aníbal Pinto (d. 1884)
- 25 April - Federico Errázuriz Zañartu (d. 1877)
- 4 August - Domingo Santa María (d. 1889)
- 18 December - Patricio Lynch (d. 1886)

== Deaths ==
- 8 February - Naihekukui
- 16 March - Camilo Henríquez (b. 1769)
