= 1823 in Chile =

- Decades: 1800s; 1810s; 1820s; 1830s; 1840s
- See also: Other events of 1823; Timeline of Chilean history

The following lists events that happened during 1823 in Chile.

== Incumbents ==
Supreme Director of Chile: Bernardo O'Higgins (-28 January), Ramón Freire (4 April-)

President of the Government Junta of Chile (1823): Agustín Eyzaguirre (28 January-4 April)

== Events ==
- date unknown - Slavery is abolished in Chile.

=== January ===
- 28 January - O'Higgins is deposed by a conservative coup. An interim Government Junta takes power.

== Births ==
- 1 January - Manuel Baquedano (d. 1897)
- 19 January - Francisco Bilbao (d. 1865)
