= Urruela =

Urruela is a surname. Notable people with the surname include:

- Acisclo Valladares Urruela (born 1976), Guatemalan attorney and notary
- Federico Urruela (1952–2004), Guatemalan diplomat and lawyer
- José Luis Chea Urruela, Guatemalan politician
