= Battle of Quechereguas (1814) =

The battle of Quechereguas
- Part of the Chilean War of Independence
Date	8 April 1814
Location	Quechereguas, Curicó Province, Chile
Result	Patriot victory

Belligerents
Chilean patriots	Royalists

Commanders and leaders
Bernardo O' Higgins	Gabino Gaínza

Strength
Unknown	Unknown

Casualties and losses
Unknown	Unknown

The battle of Quechereguas occurred on 8 April 1814, during the War of Chilean Independence.

== Background ==
The Royalists had taken the key Patriot town of Talca in March, 1814, and an army, under the command of Gabino Gaínza, now threatened to advance on the Patriot capital of Santiago itself. Bernardo O' Higgins, the famous Patriot leader, attempted to intervene to prevent this.

== The battle ==
Gabino Gaínza had crossed over the Maule river with his forces, advancing northwards. O' Higgins was unable to pursue him during the day, because of the size of the Royalist force. During the night, however, O' Higgins secretly made the crossing, marched rapidly to the north and placed himself at the site of Quechereguas, in between the Royalist force and the road to Santiago. Gabino Gaínza responded by attacking the next day; O' Higgins' men firmly repulsed the attack, forcing the Royalists to fall back on Talca once more.

== See also ==
- 1814 in Chile
- History of Chile

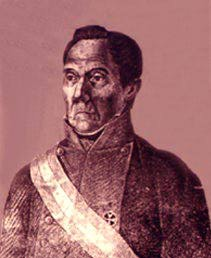
Gabino Gaínza y Fernández, the Royalist commander
