= 1828 in Chile =

- Decades: 1800s; 1810s; 1820s; 1830s; 1840s
- See also: Other events of 1828; Timeline of Chilean history

The following lists events that happened during 1828 in Chile.

== Incumbents ==
President of Chile: Francisco Antonio Pinto.

== Events ==
=== August ===
- 9 August: The Chilean Constitution is promulgated.

== Births ==
- 11 January - Miguel Luis Amunátegui (d. 1888)

== Deaths ==
- date unknown - Luis de la Cruz (b. 1768)
- 2 July - Martín Calvo Encalada (b. 1756)
- 10 November - Francisco Antonio Pérez (b. 1764)
