= Battle of Cancha Rayada =

Battle of Cancha Rayada may refer to:

- First Battle of Cancha Rayada (1814), also known as the Disaster of Cancha Rayada, a Patriot defeat during the Patria Vieja Campaign
- Second Battle of Cancha Rayada (1818), also known as the Surprise of Cancha Rayada, a Patriot defeat during the Patria Nueva Campaign
