= 1820 in Chile =

- Decades: 1800s; 1810s; 1820s; 1830s; 1840s
- See also: Other events of 1820; Timeline of Chilean history

The following lists events that happened during 1820 in Chile.

== Incumbents ==
Supreme Director of Chile: Bernardo O'Higgins

== Events ==
=== February ===
- 3-4 February - Capture of Valdivia
- 18 February - Battle of Agüi

=== March ===
- 6 March - Battle of El Toro

=== August ===
- 20 August - The Freedom Expedition of Perú sails for Paracas.

=== September ===
- 22 September - Battle of Pangal
- 26 September - Battle of Tarpellanca

=== November ===
- 25 November - Battle of Las Vegas de Talcahuano
- 27 November - Battle of Alameda de Concepcion

== Births ==
- Date unknown - Silvestre Ochagavía Errázuriz, deputy for Santiago
- 15 August - Jacinto Chacón, deputy for Santiago (died 1893)

== Deaths ==
- 28 September - Pedro Andrés del Alcázar (born 1752)
- December - Pedro de Vivar (born 1742)
