= 1822 in Chile =

- Decades: 1800s; 1810s; 1820s; 1830s; 1840s
- See also: Other events of 1822; Timeline of Chilean history

The following lists events that happened during 1822 in Chile.

== Incumbents ==
Supreme Director of Chile: Bernardo O'Higgins

== Events ==
=== August ===
- 8 August – Bernardo O'Higgins institutes a new constitution, which is seen by opponents to be an attempt to keep himself in power, leading to O'Higgins being deposed and replaced by Ramón Freire in 1823.

=== November ===
- 19 November – Copiapo earthquake
- 29 November – Thomas Cochrane leaves the service of the Chilean Navy.

== Births ==
- 13 October – Joaquín Larraín Gandarillas (d. 1897)
- November – José Joaquín Aguirre (d. 1901)

== Deaths ==
- 23 February – Vicente Benavides (b. 1777)
