= Supreme director =

Supreme director (in Spanish director supremo) was a title used to designate certain heads of state in Latin America

- The Supreme Director of the United Provinces of the Río de la Plata (modern Argentina), from 1814 to 1820.
- The Supreme Director of Chile, from 1814 to 1826, except for the period of Royalist rule from 1814 to 1817.
- The Supreme Director of Nicaragua, from 1838 to 1854.
