= 1821 in Chile =

- Decades: 1800s; 1810s; 1820s; 1830s; 1840s
- See also: Other events of 1821; Timeline of Chilean history

The following lists events that happened during 1821 in Chile.

== Incumbents ==
Supreme Director of Chile: Bernardo O'Higgins

== Events ==
=== October ===
- 6 October - Cochrane sails to California.
- 9-10 October - Battle of las Vegas de Saldías

=== December ===
- 9 December - The Cementerio General de Santiago is established.

== Births ==
- date unknown - Cornelio Saavedra Rodríguez (d. 1891)

== Deaths ==
- 4 September - José Miguel Carrera (b. 1785)
- 29 October - José Antonio Errázuriz (b. 1747)
