= 1827 in Chile =

- Decades: 1800s; 1810s; 1820s; 1830s; 1840s
- See also: Other events of 1827; Timeline of Chilean history

The following lists events that happened during 1827 in Chile.

== Incumbents ==
President of Chile: Agustín Eyzaguirre (-25 January), Ramón Freire (25 January-8 May), Francisco Antonio Pinto (-8 May)

== Events ==
=== January ===
- 25 January - Eyzaguirre resigns after a failed coup

=== February ===
- 13 February - The Chilean presidential election, 1827 is held, electing Ramon Frieire as Eyzaguirre's successor.

=== May ===
- 8 May - Friere resigns the presidency and is replaced by vice president Pinto.

=== September ===
- 12 September - The newspaper El Mercurio's Valparaiso edition is first printed.

== Births ==
- 28 November - Adolfo Ibáñez (b. 1898)
