= Order of Antonio José de Irisarri =

Award

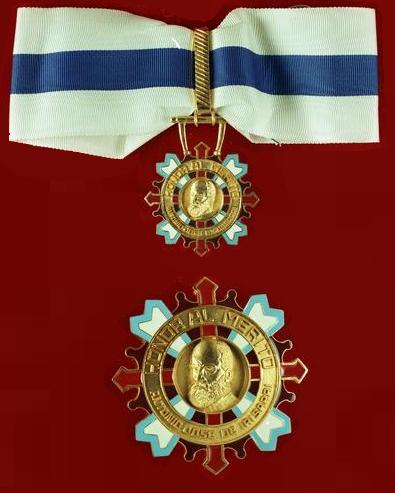
Jewel and star of a Grand Officer

The Order of Antonio José de Irisarri (Spanish: Orden "Antonio José de Irisarri") was founded in 1973 by the government of Guatemala. It was named in honour of the statesman and writer Antonio José de Irisarri. The order has five classes.

- Collar
- Grand Cross
- Grand Officer
- Commander
- Officer

There are no knights.

== Recipients ==
- Grand Crosses
  - Fahim bin Sultan Al Qasimi (businessman)
  - Fredrick Chien
  - Federico Urruela
  - Abdulla Shahid
