= Francisco de la Lastra =

First Supreme Director and military officer of Chile

General Francisco de la Lastra
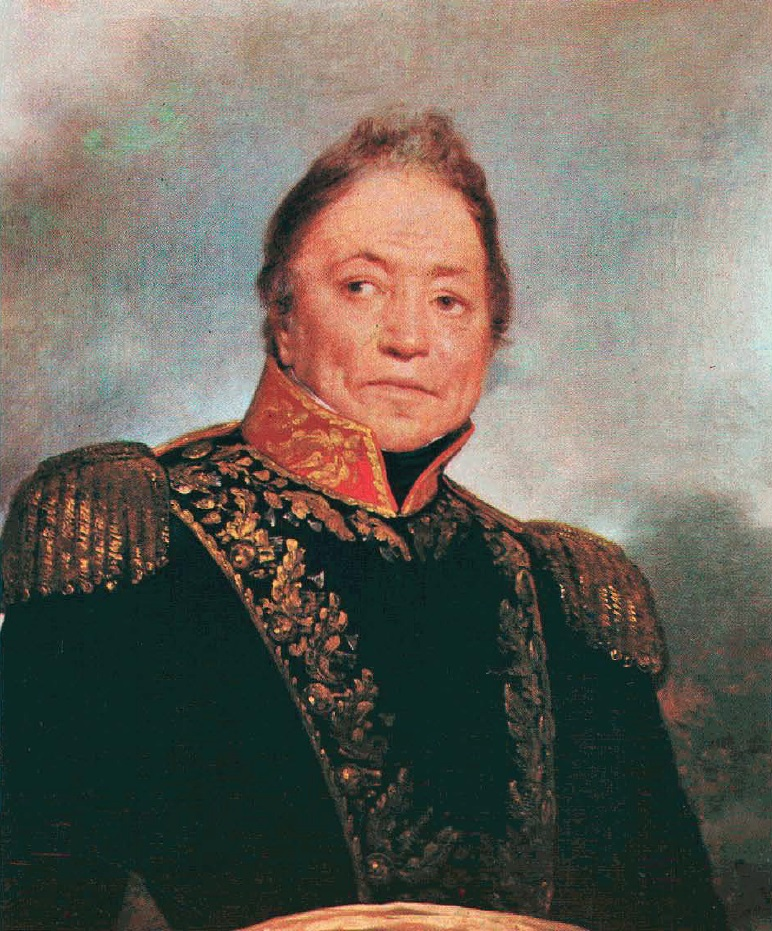

1st Supreme Director of Chile
- In office 14 March 1814 – 23 July 1814
- Preceded by: Antonio José de Irisarri
- Succeeded by: José Miguel Carrera

Member of the Chamber of Deputies
- In office 1 June 1843 – 31 May 1846

Personal details
- Born: October 4, 1777 Santiago, Chile
- Died: May 13, 1852 (aged 74) Santiago, Chile

General Francisco de la Lastra y de la Sotta (Latin American Spanish: [fɾanˈsisko ðe la ˈlastɾa]; October 4, 1777 – May 13, 1852) was a Chilean military officer and the first Supreme Director of Chile (1814).

== Biography ==
He was born on 4 October 1777 in Santiago de Chile, the son of Antonio de la Lastra Cortés and of María de la Sotta y Águila. As a young man, he was sent to Spain to pursue his studies, and served in the Royal Spanish Navy, was promoted to navy lieutenant in 1803, and remained till 1807. He returned to Chile in 1811. From the very beginning was a part of the independence movement that swept Chile from 1810 onwards. Once back he held different military assignments, enlisted in the revolutionary army, and was appointed political and military governor of Valparaíso. He organized in that port the militia and naval reserve, and also established arsenals for its defence.

In 1811, he was a substitute Deputy (representing Concepcion) to the first National Congress, that met between July 4 and December 2 of that year. On October 26, 1812, he was also one of the signatories of the Constitutional Regulation of 1812. He was named governor of Valparaíso and also was the first commander of the just created Chilean navy between 1812 and 1814. Since he had relations with the Carrera family (his brother, Manuel de la Lastra was married to Javiera Carrera, the sister of José Miguel Carrera) de la Lastra assumed power after the first (second for some) dictatorship of José Miguel Carrera, while he was going to fight against the Spanish troops commanded by Antonio Pareja and later by Gabino Gainza.

On March 14, 1814, he was chosen Supreme Director of Chile and promoted to full colonel. He governed with this title until July 23, 1814. He then was forced to sign the Treaty of Lircay with the Spanish and to change back the flag created by Carrera to the Spanish flag. He was deposed as a consequence of this event. At this point Carrera came back to Santiago and started his second (third for some authorities) dictatorship. After the defeat of Rancagua, on October 2, 1814, Francisco de la Lastra was taken prisoner and sent to Juan Fernández Islands (a group of islands located west to América) where he suffered many privations.

He was liberated after the victory of Chacabuco, re-entered the service, and, after attaining the rank of colonel, was for the second time appointed (in 1817) governor and general commander of the navy at Valparaíso. In 1823 he was promoted to Intendant of Santiago and Privy Councillor. As such, he became temporary Supreme Director, from December 30, 1823 until January 3, 1824, while the proprietary, General Ramon Freire, was away. In the same year he was commissioned by the government to arrange and organize the navy.

In 1825 he was appointed for the third time governor of Valparaíso. In 1829 he was charged with the general inspection of the army, and soon afterward appointed minister of war and the navy, with the charge of reorganizing the navy. That year he attained the rank of Navy Captain and Brigade General. He participated in the Chilean Civil War of 1829.

He then retired from public life till 1839, and in 1841 became a member of the court of appeals. In 1841 also he was named a member of the Marcial Court. He was elected a deputy to congress for Lautaro, between 1843 and 1846; and became the vice-president of the chamber on November 11, 1844. He died in Santiago, on May 13, 1852.

Political offices
Preceded by Antonio José de Irisarri	Supreme Director of Chile; 1814	Succeeded by José Miguel Carrera
Military offices
Preceded by Position created	Navy Commander; 1812-1814	Succeeded by Rudecindo Alvarado
Preceded by Rudecindo Alvarado	Navy General Commander; 1817-1818	Succeeded by Manuel Blanco Encalada
Preceded by José Ignacio Zenteno	Navy General Commander; 1825-1829	Succeeded by José María de la Cruz
