= 1816 in Chile =

- Decades: 1790s; 1800s; 1810s; 1820s; 1830s
- See also: Other events in 1816 · Timeline of Chilean history

The following lists events that happened during 1816 in Chile.

== Incumbents ==
Royal Governor of Chile: Francisco Marcó del Pont

== Deaths ==
- Date unknown - Vicente Carvallo y Goyeneche (b. 1742)
