= 1815 in Chile =

- Decades: 1790s; 1800s; 1810s; 1820s; 1830s
- See also: Other events in 1815 · Timeline of Chilean history

The following lists events that happened during 1815 in Chile.

== Incumbents ==
Royal Governor of Chile: Mariano Osorio (-26 December), Francisco Marcó del Pont (26 December)

== Births ==
20 May - Agustín Edwards Ossandón (d. 1878)
