= 1817 Chilean independence referendum =

A referendum on Chile's independence was held on 15 November 1817. After the Battle of Chacabuco, Bernardo O'Higgins was appointed director supremo. He held a plebiscite to test the popular will. This independence proposal passed with a large majority. His political program confirmed, O'Higgins's administration declared independence on 16 February 1818.
