= Hipólito de Villegas =

Chilean political figure

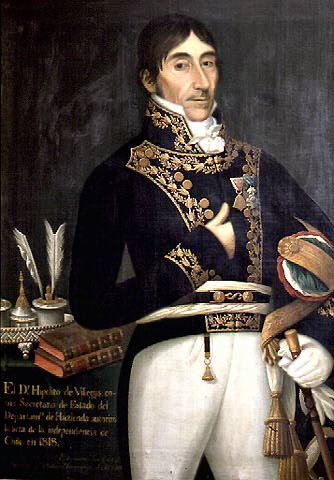
- Portrait by José Gil de Castro
- Born: 13 August 1761; Buenos Aires, Argentina
- Died: 12 April 1838 (aged 76); Santiago, Chile

Hipólito de Villegas y Fernández Manzanares (13 August 1761 – 12 April 1838) was a Chilean political figure, who participated actively in the war of independence in that country, and served as its first Minister of Finance.

Villegas was born in Buenos Aires, Argentina, but his family moved to Chile when he was very young. He studied at the Real Universidad de San Felipe and graduated as a lawyer on December 13, 1788 (incidentally becoming the first lawyer to graduate in Chile.) He was an active participant in the Chilean War of Independence. On September 25, 1811, he was elected deputy for "Coquimbo" to the first National Congress, to replace Marcos Gallo, who was a known royalist, and he went on to become Vice President of the Assembly on November 22. As such he signed the Constitution of 1812.

In 1813, he became General Commissary of the Army (functionary in charge of supplies), and was named Minister-Treasurer in 1814. Later the same year and after the Battle of Rancagua, he was forced to exile himself to Argentina. He moved to Buenos Aires, where General José de San Martín appointed him representative of the Army of the Andes, in charge of negotiating the financial support from the Buenos Ayres government.

He finally returned to Chile with the army in 1817, and was appointed Minister of Finance by Bernardo O'Higgins, a position he held from February 18, 1817, until March 30, 1818. As such, he drafted the first budget for the new republic. He was again elected a deputy, this time for "Huasco", in 1823, but resigned a month later after the exile of O'Higgins. He withdrew from public life after that until his death at the age of 77.

Government offices
Preceded by Position created	Minister of Finance; 1817–1818	Succeeded by Anselmo de la Cruz
