= Fahim bin Sultan Al Qasimi (businessman) =

- Arabic: فاهم بن سلطان القاسمي
- House: Al Qasimi
- Occupation: Businessman

Fahim bin Sultan Al Qasimi (Arabic: فاهم بن سلطان القاسمي) is a businessperson, statesman, and conservationist from the United Arab Emirates.

== Biography ==
Qasimi attended Emirates International School and earned a master's degree in international relations from the University of Cambridge. He co-founded Seafood Souq, a digital business to business seafood venture, in 2018. In 2019 he was named to the "40 Under 40" list of Arabian Business. Qasimi is a member of the Executive Council of the Emirate of Sharjah and serves as executive chairman of the government relations department. He is an advocate for the Dubai Turtle Rehabilitation Project and has been called "the turtle sheikh".

== Honours ==
- Order of Antonio José de Irisarri, Grand Cross
