= Spanish ship Argonauta (1798) =

Ship of the line of the Spanish Navy

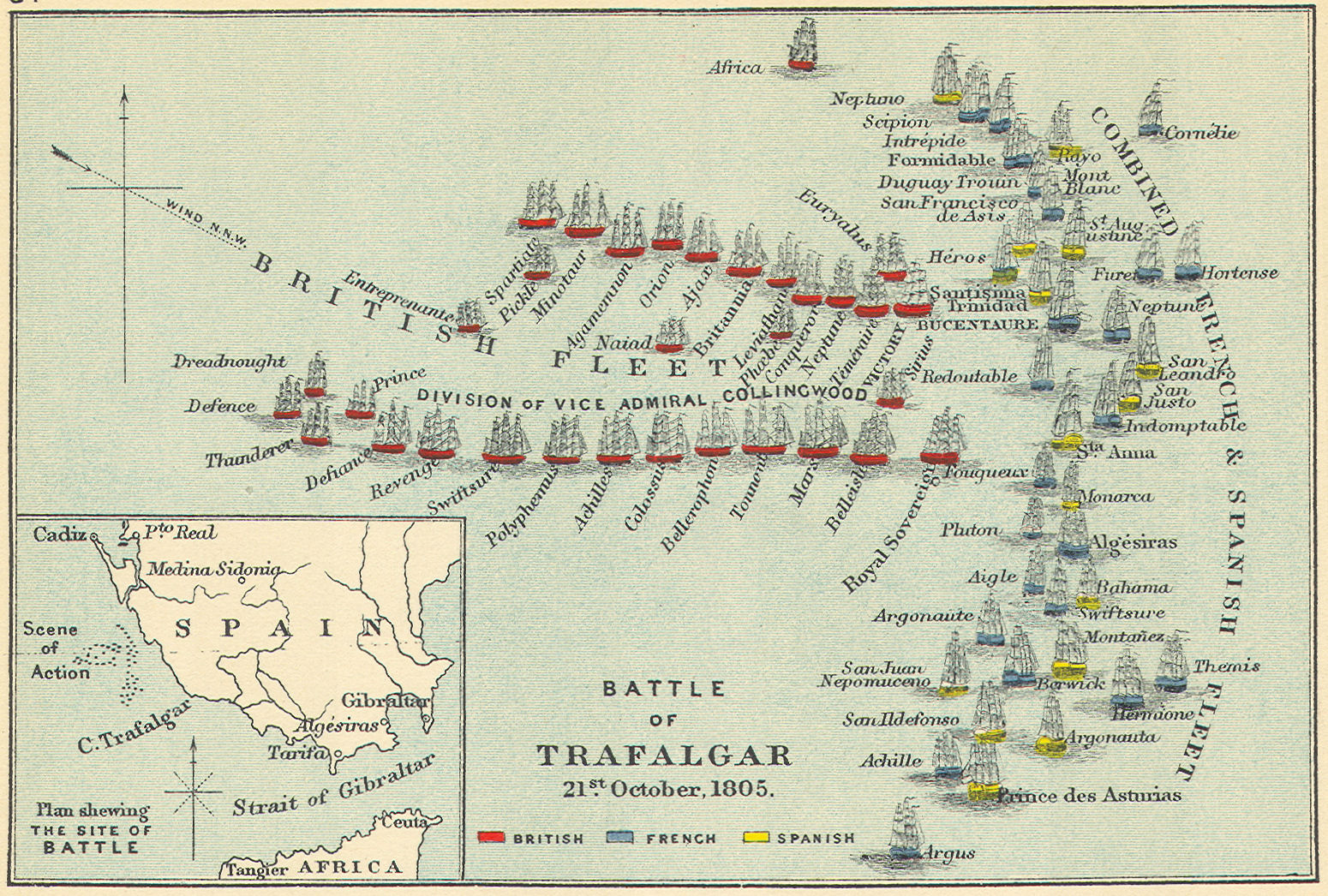
- Map of the Battle of Trafalgar depicting Argonauta

History

Spain
- Name: Argonauta
- Ordered: 11 November 1795
- Builder: Naval Dockyard, Ferrol
- Launched: 7 July 1798
- Fate: Sank 30 October 1805

Argonauta was an 80-gun ship of the line of the Spanish Navy. She initially had 24, 18 and 8 pounder guns spread over her lower, upper, quarter and forecastle decks, but by 1805 she carried 36-pounders instead of 24-pounders. Her original crew was 21 officers and 642 ratings and soldiers, though it was 956 at the Battle of Cape Finisterre and 800 at Trafalgar.

== History ==
A sister ship of Neptuno, she was ordered in November 1795 and launched in June 1798 in Ferrol, to the design of Julian Martín Retamosa. On 25 August 1800, she and the other ships of Joaquín Moreno's squadron (the Real Carlos, San Hermenegildo, San Fernando, San Antonio and San Agustín) fought off the British Ferrol Expedition. By 1805 her original main battery of thirty 24-pounder guns had been replaced by the same number of 36-pounders. Unlike her sister Neptuno, the Argonauta retained her upper deck batter of thirty-two 18-pounders; the original quarter and forecastle decks armament of eighteen 8-pounders had been reduced by two, and instead twelve 30-pounder obuses (howitzers) had been added on those decks, so that her actual armament was 90 carriage guns. She also mounted four small 4-pounder obuses on the poop.

Argonauta fought at the Battle of Cape Finisterre on 22 July 1805. On the 21 October the same year she was present in Federico Gravina's second squadron at the Battle of Trafalgar, under the command of Captain Antonio Pareja and his deputy, Frigate Captain Pedro Albarracin, and losing 60 dead and 148 wounded. She was captured and taken in tow by HMS Polyphemus, but the tow had to be dropped during the storm which followed the battle. On 24 October HMS Defiance rescued survivors from the Argonauta and made a failed attempt to re-establish a tow. Vice-Admiral Cuthbert Collingwood ordered the ship to be scuttled on 26 October.

== Bibliography ==
- Adkin, Mark (2005). The Trafalgar Companion: A Guide to History's Most Famous Sea Battle and the Life of Admiral Lord Nelson. Aurum. ISBN 1-84513-018-9.
- Adkins, Roy (2004). Trafalgar: The Biography of a Battle. Little, Brown. ISBN 0-316-72511-0.
- Clayton, Tim & Craig, Phil (2004). Trafalgar: The Men, the Battle, the Storm. Hodder & Stoughton. ISBN 0-340-83026-3.
- Fremont-Barnes, Gregory (2005). Trafalgar 1805: Nelson's Crowning Victory. Campaign. Vol. 157. Osprey Publishing. ISBN 1-84176-892-8.
- Goodwin, Peter (2005). The Ships of Trafalgar: The British, French and Spanish Fleets October 1805. Naval Institute Press. ISBN 1-59114-824-3.
- Winfield, Rif; Tredrea, John M; García-Torralba Pérez, Enrique & Blasco Felip, Manuel (2023). Spanish Warships in the Age of Sail 1700—1860: Design, Construction, Careers and Fates. Barnsley, UK: Seaforth Publishing. ISBN 978-1-5267-9078-1.
