= Chilean Declaration of Independence =

1818 Proclamation

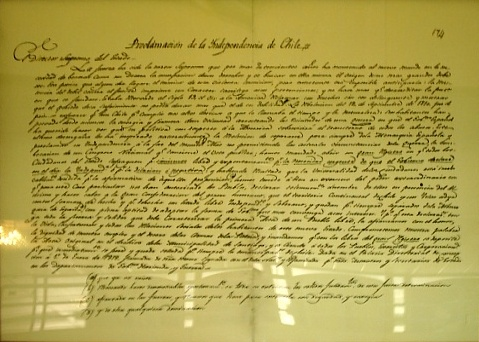
Chilean Declaration of Independence document preserved at the National Congress of Chile, Valparaíso

The Chilean Declaration of Independence is a document declaring the independence of Chile from the Spanish Empire. It was drafted in January 1818 and approved by Supreme Director Bernardo O'Higgins on 12 February 1818 at Talca, despite being dated in Concepción on 1 January 1818. The ceremony of independence was performed on 12 February 1818, the first anniversary of the Battle of Chacabuco.

The original document, displaying manuscript comments by O'Higgins, was damaged at the Palace of the Real Audiencia of Santiago. In 1832, under President José Joaquín Prieto, a new copy was sent to Peru to be signed by O'Higgins, and later by his former ministers, Miguel Zañartu, Hipólito Villegas and José Ignacio Zenteno, who were still living in Chile. This copy was kept at the Palacio de La Moneda until the 1973 Chilean coup d'état, when it was destroyed during the fighting.

== Historical background ==
¿Jura usted defender la patria hasta derramar la última gota de sangre, para conservarla ilesa hasta depositarla en manos del señor don Fernando VII, nuestro soberano, o de su legítimo sucesor; conservar y guardar nuestra religión y leyes; hacer justicia y reconocer al supremo Consejero de Regencia como representante de la majestad Real?

In English:

Do you swear to defend the fatherland to the last drop of your blood, to keep it unharmed in the hands of Ferdinand VII, our lord, or his rightful heir; to uphold and protect our religion and our laws; to maintain justice and recognize the supreme Counselor of the Regency as the representative of His Royal Majesty?

— First National Junta Oath, 18 September 1810

By 1817, the Chilean War of Independence had entered its final phase, and there was little doubt that its final goal, national independence, would be realized. Even though Chile had been operating independently from Spain for several years, no formal declaration of independence had yet been produced.

One of the first official documents to address the issue of independence was the Provisional Constitutional Regulations of 1812, introduced by José Miguel Carrera on 27 October 1812. Article V of this document states that "No decree, ruling or order, issued by any authority or courts outside the territory of Chile, will have any effect; anyone who tries to give them force will be punished as criminals of the State", while also recognizing the authority of Fernando VII in Article III.

At the beginning of Patria Nueva, a period that began with the victory at the Battle of Chacabuco, Chile had a government with its own authorities which controlled much of the territory of Chile, had a flag, a coat-of-arms and its own currency, all of which indicated that Chile had become an independent state. Thus, there was no pressing need to make an explicit declaration of independence, as the United States of America had done in 1776, Venezuela in 1811, Colombia in 1813, and Argentina in 1816.

The President of Chile, Bernardo O'Higgins, bore in mind the problems experienced by the previous era, and convinced the members of his assembly that declaring independence would be difficult and problematic at this time, as the country was still warring against the Spanish Royalists and because the establishment of internal order was indispensable towards the goal of independence. Therefore, it was decided that a plebiscite would be held instead.

== Popular consultation ==
On 13 November 1817, the Superior Governmental Junta, in the absence of O'Higgins, who was overseeing military operations in the southern part of Chile, issued a decree declaring that a referendum was to be set up to run for fifteen days. The referendum would be held in each of the four administrative quarters of Santiago, and would run for fifteen days, during which residents would sign their views in favor or against the Declaration of Independence. Cities and towns were advised to follow the same procedure.

The decree was sent alongside the referendum form to the authorities of the regional governments and bore the signatures of several Junta members: Luis de la Cruz, Francisco Antonio Pérez, José Manuel Astorga, and the Minister of the Interior Miguel Zañartu. On 15 November, Zañartu sent a brief to the same recipients instructing them to publish the form "as soon as possible".

The result of the referendum was favorable to O'Higgins. The new order had the support of the majority of citizens who participated in the referendum, though many who did not agree did not participate because they feared their votes would bring persecution towards them. However, in Concepción, the plebiscite was not complete, and was only held in a few locations, as reported by O'Higgins on 23 December 1817 from his camp opposite Talcahuano: "[...] habían empezado a remitir algunos partidos las suscripciones [...] pero las ocurrencias ulteriores en la provincia y la medida últimamente adoptada de hacer emigrar de ella a todos sus habitantes, no permiten esta operación".

During the month of December, after checking the results, the government began preparations to make a solemn declaration of independence. This coincided with news about the upcoming arrival of a new Royalist expedition under the command of Spanish Brigadier Mariano Osorio, aimed at reconquering Chile.

Since the plebiscite had decided in favor of a declaration of independence, it was decided that a formal act would be drawn up which concisely and clearly represented the will of the Chilean people. The process would mimic that of other countries which had already declared their independence. A manifesto was also to be published which would outline the rationale and reasons for the declaration. The person in charge of this work would be Miguel Zañartu, and secondly Bernardo Vera y Pintado.

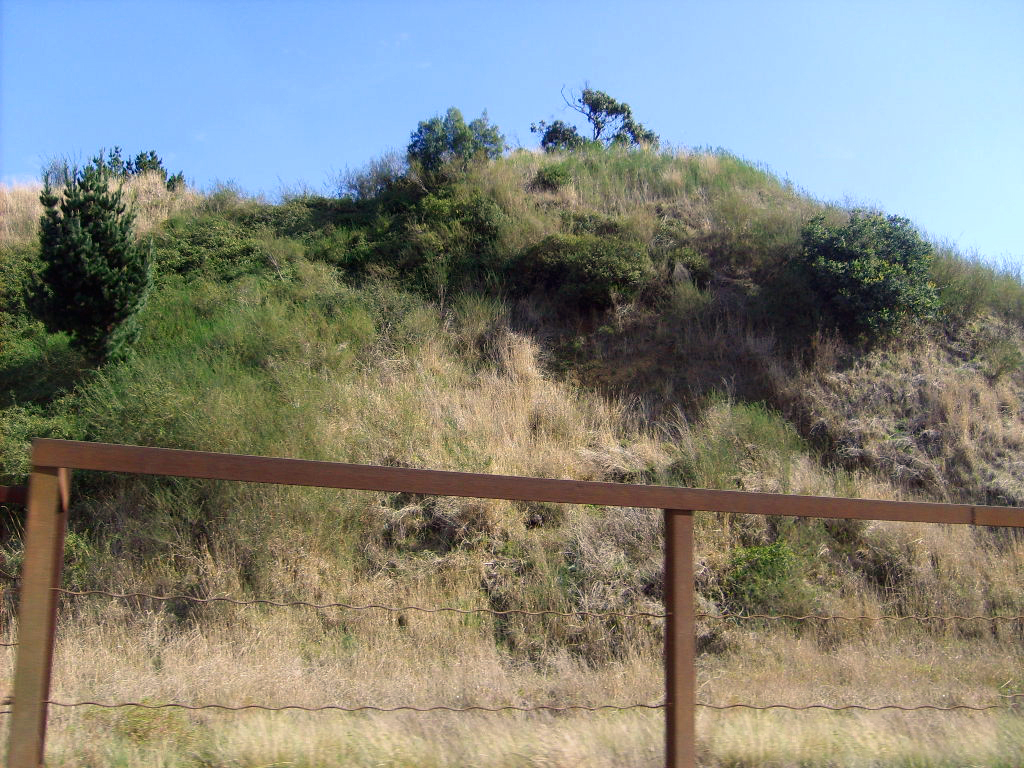
Morrillo de Perales in Talcahuano

At the end of 1817, O'Higgins was present at the siege of Talcahuano against the Spanish forces. When the uncertain military situation forced O'Higgins' forces to lift the siege, they retreated to Morrillos de Perales (now known as the "U" hill). This was a position which the patriots had chosen and which dominated one of the gates of Talcahuano. On 1 January 1818, a message of independence asserting that Chile was a "free and sovereign country, not a rebel province" was drafted, written on a drum according to folklore. The message was addressed to Colonel José Ordóñez, the Spanish controller of the port of Talcahuano and former mayor of Concepción. This document is considered the first declaration of independence of Chile.

== Pledge of independence ==
The formal ceremony and pledge of independence was set for the first anniversary of the Battle of Chacabuco: 12 February 1818.

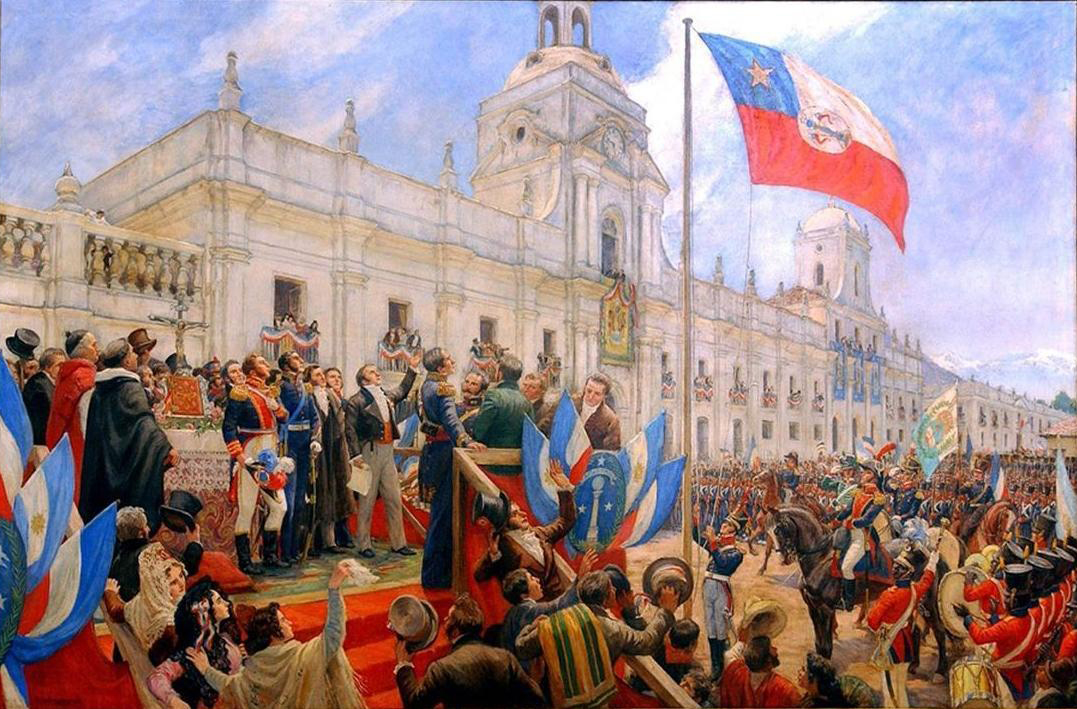
Proclamation of the Chilean Declaration of Independence (Pedro Subercaseaux, 1945). (Note: Bernardo O’Higgins is erroneously shown in the painting, as he was actually in Talca on that day.)

On 9 February, Luis de la Cruz published the program of the ceremonies and celebration to be held in Santiago. These activities commenced on 11 February in the afternoon with the firing of cannons from Cerro Santa Lucía. At nine o'clock on 12 February, all the authorities and people of the Palacio Directorial de Santiago mounted a stage in front of the Plaza de Armas in Santiago.

The ceremony was opened by José Gregorio Argomedo, prosecutor of the Chilean Court of Appeals, who gave a speech representing the government, after which the minister Miguel Zañartu read the Act of Independence. de la Cruz then requested the oath from José Ignacio Cienfuegos, administrator of the Santiago Diocese, who had earlier added the phrasing "Y así juro porque creo en mi conciencia que ésta es la voluntad del Eterno" ("And so I swear on my conscience that this is the will of the Eternal"). Following this, Cruz heard the oath from José de San Martín, the General in Chief of the Chilean Army. Minister Zañartu also took the oath along with several other authorities and public officials. Finally, the Mayor of Santiago, Francisco de Borja Fontecilla, swore the oath to the people.

On 13 February, a Te Deum was sung at the Santiago Cathedral, and, the next day, the cathedral celebrated a Mass of thanksgiving. After this, Tomás Guido gave a speech congratulating the Chilean people on behalf of the Buenos Aires government. The public celebration of independence in Santiago lasted until 16 February. The declaration itself was widely distributed to the populace. Another document, which covered the motives behind the revolution and declaration of independence, written by Bernardo Vera, was also distributed to the public to a lesser extent.

In Talca, on 12 February, O'Higgins presided over the swearing-in of the Independent Southern Army, and the subsequent ceremony with ceremonial gunfire, a Mass, Te Deum and public festivities. During these few days, the declaration of independence was made in many other cities and towns of Chile, with as many festivities as could be had. In La Serena, independence was declared on 27 February and the festivities lasted until 1 March and in Copiapó the ceremony took place between March 27 and 28.

On 15 June 1820, Valdivia was sworn into the new nation, after Thomas Cochrane led a successful attempt to capture it from the royalists. Later, on 22 January 1826, the pledge of independence would be made in San Carlos, Chiloé, after the Spanish signed the Treaty of Tantauco, which gave the Chiloé Archipelago to Chile.

== See also ==
- Battle of Maipú
- Chilean War of Independence
- Juan Albano Pereira Márquez

== Sources ==
- Frías Valenzuela, Francisco (November 1993) [1986]. Historia de Chile. Desde la Prehistoria hasta 1973 [History of Chile. From prehistory to 1973] (in Spanish) (11th ed.). Santiago: Empresa Editora Zig-Zag. ISBN 956-12-0766-4.
- Valencia Avaria, Luis (1942). "La declaración de la independencia de Chile" [The declaration of independence of Chile]. Boletín de la Academia Chilena de la Historia (in Spanish). IX (23).
