= Anselmo de la Cruz y Bahamonde =

Chilean political figure

Anselmo de la Cruz y Bahamonde (baptized April 19, 1764 – July 23, 1833) was a Chilean political figure. He served several times as minister and participated actively in the war of independence in that country.

De la Cruz was born in Talca. A member of a royalist family, he was an active participant in the Chilean War of Independence. During the administration of Bernardo O'Higgins he was Minister of Finance twice, first in 1818 and then again in 1818–1820. He died in Santiago on July 23, 1833.

Political offices
Preceded by Hipólito de Villegas	Minister of Finance; 1818	Succeeded by José Miguel Infante
Preceded by José Miguel Infante	Minister of Finance; 1818–1820	Succeeded by José Antonio Rodríguez
