= Carlos Spano =

Spanish Army officer

Carlos Spano (Málaga, Spain; 1773 – † Talca, Chile; March 3, 1814) was a Spanish Army officer who served in the Chilean War of Independence.

Spano began his military career in 1786 as a soldier in the Spanish Army, and fought in the campaigns of Ceuta, Spanish Morocco and Aragon (against the French). He was sent to Chile with the Battalion of Infantes de Concepción. In 1787 he was promoted to Lieutenant of the Dragones de la Frontera. He married María de las Nieves Ceballos.

He supported the patriot side on the Chilean War of Independence, and in 1813 was promoted to Sergeant Major of Grenadiers. As such he participated with distinction in the Siege of Chillan (August 1813) where he was injured. On November 27, 1813, he was promoted to Colonel and named General Commander of Grenadiers in replacement of Juan José Carrera. The Government Junta put him in command of the defense of the city of Talca, where he died while at the head of his troops in the First Battle of Talca.

His name was given to one of the first units of the Peruvian navy, the brig "Colonel Spano".

== External links and sources ==
- Short Biography (in Spanish)
