= 1829 in Chile =

- Decades: 1800s; 1810s; 1820s; 1830s; 1840s
- See also: Other events of 1829; Timeline of Chilean history

The following lists events that happened during 1829 in Chile.

== Incumbents ==
President of Chile: Francisco Antonio Pinto (-2 November), Francisco Ramón Vicuña(2 November-7 December)

== Events ==
- Chilean Civil War of 1829–30

=== May ===
- 15–16 May - The Chilean presidential election, 1829 reelects Pinto as president.

=== November ===
- 2 November - President Pinto resigns and is replaced by vice president Francisco Ramón Vicuña.

== Deaths ==
- 12 September - Juan Ignacio Molina (b. 1740)
