= José Ignacio Zenteno =

Chilean soldier and politician

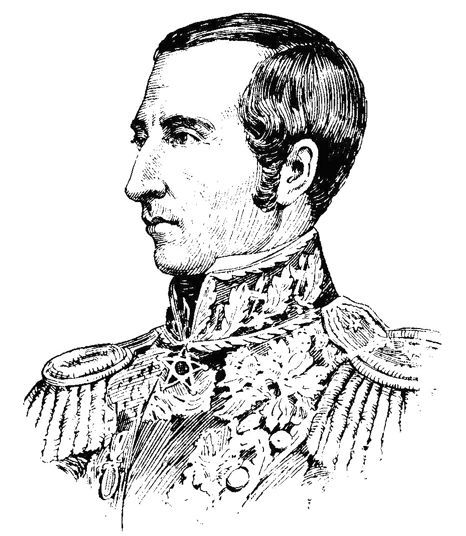
- Born: July 28, 1786; Santiago, Chile
- Died: July 16, 1847 (aged 60); Santiago, Chile

José Ignacio Zenteno del Pozo y Silva (July 28, 1786 – July 16, 1847), was a Chilean soldier, politician and hero of the Chilean War of Independence.

Zenteno was born in Santiago, the son of Antonio Zenteno y Bustamante and of Victoria del Pozo y Silva. He completed his studies at the Colegio Carolino, and took part in the movement for independence from the very beginning. In 1814, he became the secretary of Supreme Director Francisco de la Lastra, and was forced after the defeat of Rancagua, together with other patriots, to emigrate to Mendoza, Argentina, where, soon after his arrival, he was appointed secretary of the treasury of that province. There he befriended General José de San Martín, of whom became one of his principal assessors.

He formed part of the liberating army of Chile, and made the campaigns of 1817 and 1818, taking part in the battles of Cancha Rayada and Maipu. He was named Governor of Valparaíso and when General Bernardo O'Higgins was elected Supreme Director, he appointed Zenteno as Secretary of War and Navy where he distinguished himself by his activity. The government entrusted him with the formation of the First Chilean Navy Squadron, and he laid the foundation of the Chilean Navy which, under Admiral Lord Cochrane, obtained such glorious results. He created the first course of ship-ensigns. In 1822, after retiring from the ministry of war, he was appointed political and military governor of Valparaiso, and promoted to brigadier.

In 1831 he was appointed inspector-general of the army, and from 1833 till 1846 he filled several important offices in the war department, and was also a member of the supreme council of war, the Society of agriculture, and was several times elected to congress representing Santiago and later, Victoria, and serving as vice-president of the chamber of deputies. He was one of the founders and first editor of the El Mercurio of Valparaíso, taught law at the Universidad de Chile and was a member of the martial court (military tribunal). He died in Santiago at the age of 61.

Government offices
Preceded by Manuel Rodríguez	Minister of War and Navy; 1817–1822	Succeeded by José Antonio Rodríguez Aldea
Military offices
Preceded by Manuel Blanco Encalada	Navy General Commander; 1821–1825	Succeeded by Francisco de la Lastra
