= Quechereguas =

- Village
- Quechereguas
- Country: Chile
- Region: Maule
- Province: Talca
- Commune: Molina

Quechereguas is a Chilean village located in Molina, Talca Province, Maule Region.

It is bordered by the Lontué River. Quechereguas was described by Francisco Solano Asta-Buruaga y Cienfuegos in his book Diccionario Geográfico de la República de Chile in 1899 as being "notable for the battle which occurred on 8 April 1814 between royalists and patriots during the Independence War [of Chile]." The battle in question is known as the Battle of Quechereguas. A similar battle occurred on 15 March 1818.

Quechereguas comes from the Mapudungun words quechu and rehue, meaning together "five districts or portions of Indians [Mapuches]."
