= 1827 Chilean presidential election =

- February 13, 1827

46 members of the National Congress 24 votes needed to win
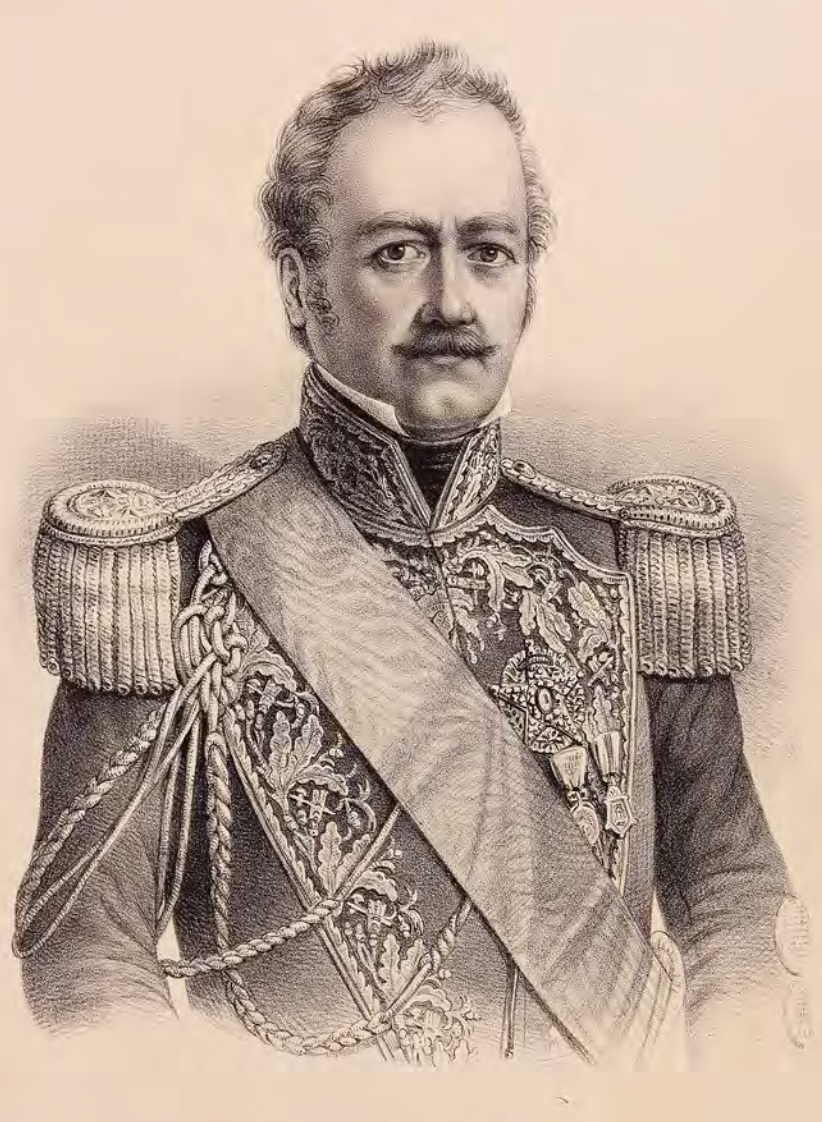
Nominee	Ramón Freire
Party	Pipiolos
Running mate	Francisco Antonio Pinto
Electoral vote	37
Percentage	80.43%
President before election
Ramón Freire
Pipiolos
Elected President
Ramón Freire
Pipiolos

Presidential elections were held in Chile on February 13, 1827, after the National Congress of Chile decided by vote to elect a new president.

Following the coup d'état by Colonel Enrique Campino and the resignation of vice president and acting president —since Manuel Blanco Encalada's resignation— Agustín Eyzaguirre, Congress petitioned General Ramón Freire to take the seat of president on January 30, 1827.

On February 5, Freire presented his resignation before Congress, which decided to elect a new president of the Republic on February 13. The Congress elected Freire as the new president with 37 votes, and Francisco Antonio Pinto as vice president with 27 votes, from a total of 46 deputies present. Congress knew Freire would resign after Pinto's arrival in Santiago, so the election was only a sign of appreciation towards him.

Pinto's election, although won with a scant majority, signified a great victory for the liberals.

== Results ==
=== President ===
Candidate	Party	Votes	%
Ramón Freire	Pipiolos	37	80.43
Against		9	19.57
Total		46	100.00
Source: Letelier

=== Vice President ===
Candidate	Party	Votes	%
Francisco Antonio Pinto	Pipiolos	27	58.70
Against		19	41.30
Total		46	100.00
Source: Letelier
