= Federico Urruela =

Guatemalan diplomat and lawyer

- Born: October 7, 1952; Guatemala City, Guatemala
- Died: January 31, 2004 (aged 51)
- Occupations: Diplomat and lawyer
- Known for: Guatemalan ambassador to Canada, Switzerland, Austria, and the United Nations

Federico Urruela Prado (October 7, 1952, Guatemala City – January 31, 2004), Guatemalan diplomat and lawyer.

He graduated from the Rafael Landivar University and served as examining magistrate for several years before joining the Guatemalan Foreign Service in 1977. He was named Ambassador in 1983. His diplomatic career spanned posts in Ottawa, Ontario, Canada (1983–1990), Geneva, Switzerland (1990–1997) and Vienna, Austria (1997–2004).

He was Ambassador to the United Nations in Geneva when the Guatemalan Government and the Guatemalan National Revolutionary Unity (URNG) negotiated the Peace Accords, brokered by the UN, to end over 30 years of armed conflict. He played a significant role in the negotiations that took place in Geneva.

In Austria, he was Ambassador to Austria and also to the United Nations in Vienna, and was instrumental in strengthening ties between Guatemala and Austria, both economically and culturally. He died on January 31, 2004, and was posthumously decorated by the Government of Guatemala in February 2004, with the Order of Antonio José de Irisarri in the Grade of the Great Cross (Orden de Antonio José de Irisarri en el Grado de Gran Cruz) and in July 2004 the Austrian Government awarded him the Grand Decoration of Honour in Gold with Sash for Services to the Republic of Austria (Großes Goldenes Ehrenzeichen am Bande für Verdienste um die Republik Österreich).
