= José Miguel Infante =

Chilean statesman and political figure

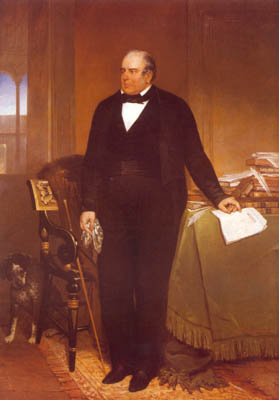

President of Government Junta
- In office August 23, 1813 – January 11, 1814
- Preceded by: Francisco Antonio Pérez
- Succeeded by: Agustín Eyzaguirre

Personal details
- Born: José Miguel Infante y Rojas; March 1778 Santiago, Captaincy General of Chile
- Died: April 9, 1844 (aged 66) Santiago, Chile

José Miguel Infante y Rojas (March 1778 - April 9, 1844) was a Chilean statesman and political figure. He served several times as deputy and minister, and was the force behind the Chilean Federalist movement.

== Early life ==
Rojas was born in Santiago, Chile to Agustín Infante y Prado and of Rosa Rojas. He studied law at the College of San Carlos, and was admitted to practice in 1806. From a very young age, he had an interest in political philosophy and classics. His maternal uncle, José Antonio de Rojas, motivated him by granting him access to his library, which was at that point the most extensive in Chile. There, he became acquainted with the works of French and English enlightenment authors, including those who were prohibited by the Catholic Church- a prominent power at the time. During this time, he also became interested in the work of Voltaire and the Encyclopedists, and became one of the foremost theorists of the age in Chile. When the first signs of the revolution began to show, he was one of the earliest to accept the idea.

== Political career ==
In 1810, he became corporation counselor of the municipality of Santiago. The year 1810 was very complicated politically for the Spanish empire in general, and for Chile in particular. Two years before the King Ferdinand VII had been imprisoned in France. In Chile, the Royal Governor Francisco Antonio García Carrasco had been forced to resign due to his ineptitude and corruption, and had been replaced by Mateo de Toro y Zambrano. Infante's intellectual reputation helped him contribute to the formation of the first independent junta that could help reshape the political arena. So, after Mateo de Toro y Zambrano took over as Royal Governor, he was convinced to call an open meeting of the leading citizens of the city to decide the political future of the colony. He convened such a meeting for the morning of September 18, 1810. The discussion ended with the conformation of the Government Junta of the Kingdom of Chile, where he was a very active member of the assembly.

In the first meeting he asked for the convocation of a popular congress to declare the independence of the nation, and, notwithstanding strong opposition, carried his point. The congress that met July 4, 1811, may be said to be principally the work of Infante. He was also elected as a member of this first National Congress (as a Deputy for Santiago), and became its first secretary. In 1813 and 1814 he was a member of the Government Juntas that functioned in that period. When the first President of the independent government, José Miguel Carrera, was elected commander-in-chief of the forces that marched to repel the invasion of General Antonio Pareja, Infante was elected regent of the Government Junta. During his term the junta adopted the national flag, and founded the National institute of science and numerous primary schools throughout the country.

In 1814 he was sent as diplomatic agent to the revolutionary government of Buenos Ayres, where he remained for some time, but due to the after-effects of the disaster of Rancagua, he was forced to seek refuge in the United Provinces of the Rio de la Plata. He was only able to return to Chile after the battle of Chacabuco, in 1817. That same year he was appointed secretary of the treasury by the Supreme Director Bernardo O'Higgins. He introduced many improvements during his short term of office, and not being in accord with the director, he soon resigned.

On January 28, 1823, with other citizens, he convened a public meeting, and defended the liberty of the nation. O'Higgins in consequence resigned the executive. After the resignation of O’Higgins, Infante became a member of the Government Junta that assumed power. In the same year General Ramon Freire was elected Supreme Director, and offered Infante a seat in the Superior Court, which he at first declined, but afterward accepted, His first measure was the abolition of slavery in the territory of Chile, which in later years he counted as his principal glory. He desired that the only inscription on his tomb should be "The author of the law of abolition."

At this point, his political career took a different route when he was elected as a Senator for Santiago. He became vice-president and President of the Senate. When General Freire marched for the second time against the Spanish forces in the archipelago of Chiloe in 1824, he instituted a council of regency, of which Infante became president. He also became Provisional Supreme Director, between November 1825 and March 1826. One of his principal measures during this period was the banishment of bishop Zorrilla, whose intrigues were threatening the public security.

=== Federalist attempt ===
The Constitution of 1823 (promulgated after the resignation of O'Higgins) had a very short life, and was abrogated in 1826 in order to discuss the system of government that was to rule the country. Infante was an admirer of the United States, and in 1826, as senator laid before congress a proposition to form a federal republic. As his ideas were not generally accepted, he supported them by founding in 1827 the newspaper "El Valdiviano Federal" of which he was the editor, and till his death he continued to write all the leading articles for this paper. The new constitution was supposed to come out of a constitutional assembly, but the great political skills of Infante managed to organize his supporters in order to pass a group of laws that were to grant a federal organization to the country bypassing the assembly.

This way, the country was divided into 8 provinces, each to be ruled by a provincial assembly and an Intendant, elected by direct popular vote. In the practice, this was a direct decentralization of power and the generation of a federal structure. This new structure was riddled with problems from the very beginning and was never able to be implemented fully, specially due to problems with the geographical limits between the provinces, and the determination of the provincial capitals. The principal reason behind the collapse of the attempt was that it run counter to the long tradition of centralized government in the country.

It also ran against the unitary feelings of most of the aristocracy. The experiment was very short lived. The congress dissolved itself in June, 1827 and the attempt was ended by President Francisco Antonio Pinto in 1828. That same year, a new constitution was approved, and Infante, faithful to his credo refused to acknowledge it. The Civil War of 1829 and the conservative regime that came out of it allowed him to be elected to congress again in 1830.

== Later life ==
After this failure, the federalist group started to dwindle. He had been elected as a deputy for Curicó. Nonetheless, his constant opposition to the government caused him to be expelled from the chamber with the argument that the election had not been held properly.

Due to this situation, he retired from active political life and continued defending his ideas and the promotion of his federalist ideal until the end of his life from the pages of his newspaper. In 1843 the government acknowledged his eminent services by appointing him as first judge of the supreme court and member of the faculty of law of the Universidad de Chile, but he refused both appointments. Also in 1843, at the age of 65, he got married for the first time, to Rosa Munita. He died the following year on April 9, 1844, in Santiago.

Political offices
Preceded by Francisco Antonio Pérez	President of Government Junta; 1813-1814	Succeeded by Agustín Eyzaguirre
Preceded by None	Member of Government Junta; 1823	Succeeded by None
Government offices
Preceded by Anselmo de la Cruz	Minister of Finance; 1818	Succeeded by Anselmo de la Cruz
