= Vicente Quezada =

Chilean lawyer and lawmaker

- Born: Vicente Quezada c. 1812; Copiapó, Chile
- Died: 1877 (aged 64–65); Copiapó, Chile
- Occupations: Lawyer and lawmaker

Vicente Quezada (1812-1877) was a Chilean lawyer and lawmaker.

He was born in Copiapó in 1812. He attended school at the Instituto Nacional, earning his law degree in 1834. He lived in Copiapó in the heyday of mining nearby at Chañarcillo and Atacama. For many years, he was an attorney with the old and respected firm of Gallo and Goyenechea, which promoted mining in the province and northern coast. In 1865 he wrote a draft Mining Code on behalf of the Supreme Government, based in part on Mexico's industrial code. He worked in the press of Copiapó and belonged to the Radical Party. He was active in the constitutional revolution of 1859 and belonged to the Copiapó's radical assembly. On several occasions, he worked in the Municipality of Copiapó. He died in Copiapó in 1877.
