= Battle of Mesamávida =

Coordinates: 37.5588°S 72.5144°W

- Part of Chilean War of Independence
Date	February 23, 1819
Location	Mesamávida, near Negrete
Result	Royalist victory

Belligerents
Chile	Spain

The Battle of Mesamávida was a Royalist victory during the Guerra a muerte campaign of the Chilean War of Independence. It was fought on 23 February 1819.

Chilean Leiutenant Pueyrredon recalled his force of 50 infantrymen and 42 cavalrymen being ambushed by 400 Spanish soldiers of the Canabrian Regiment. Pueyrredon's stated that his forces held out until the Spanish allied Araucanian Indians attacked and he was overrun. Pueryrredon was wounded and left for dead on the battlefield.
