= 1818 Chilean constitutional referendum =

A referendum on Chile's provisional constitution was held on 23 October 1818. The provisional constitution, which was successfully adopted, was written by the legislative council at Bernardo O'Higgins's request. The resulting document included 141 articles. It established a Director Supremo with an unlimited term of office who would appoint all judges, governors, offices and secretaries. The Director Supremo could also appoint five members and five alternate members in the senate. The Senate was granted some limited power to veto actions of the Director Supremo. This provisional constitution also established three provinces with governors, and specified that Catholicism was the only legal religion. This provisional document was approved, but was replaced with a permanent constitution in 1822.
