= Juan Esteban Rodríguez Segura =

Chilean politician (1818–1901)

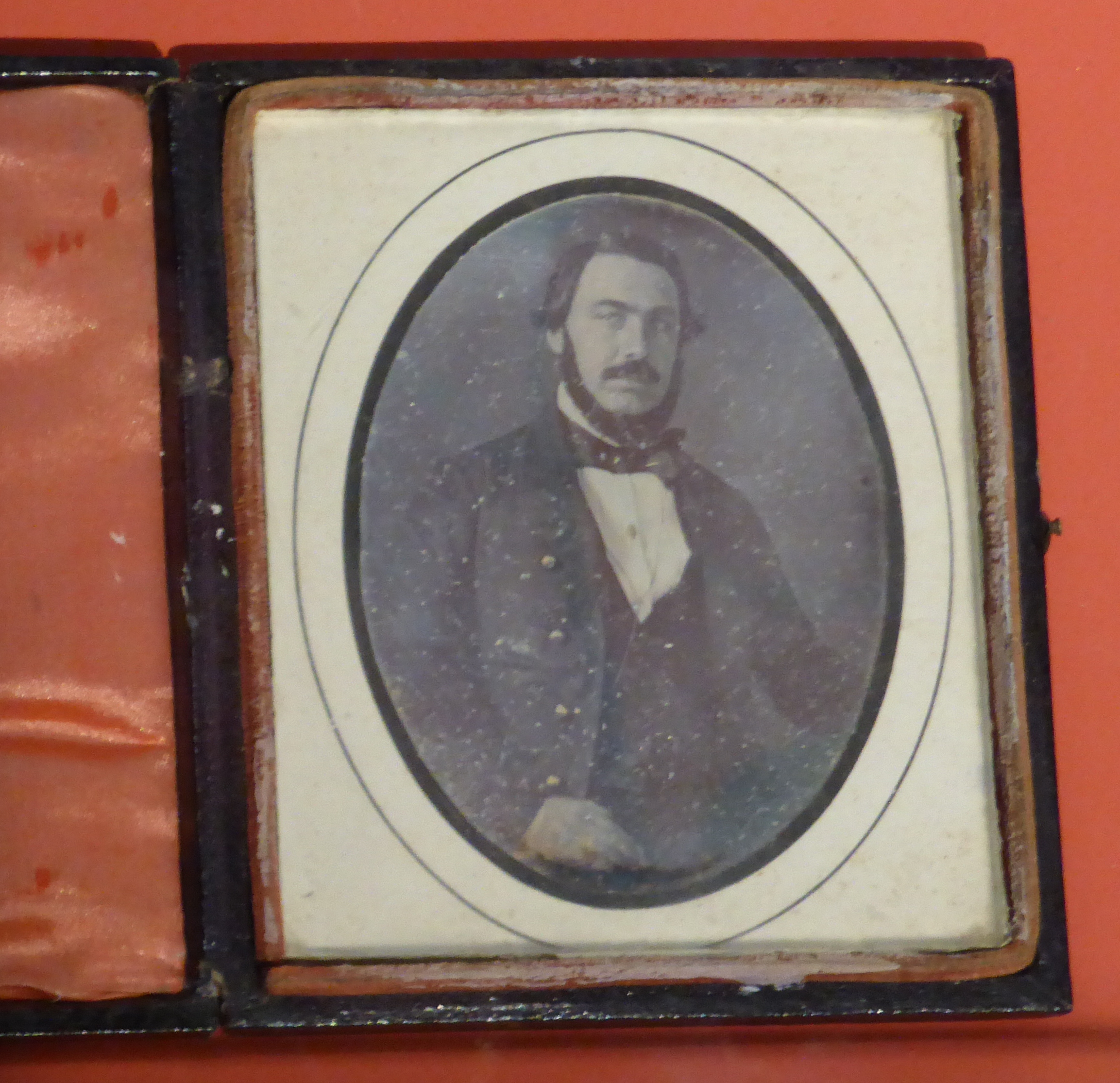
- Daguerreotype of Juan Esteban Rodríguez Segura, Museo de Colchagua
- Born: 24 April 1818; Santiago de Chile, Chile
- Died: 17 September 1901 (aged 83); Santiago de Chile, Chile
- Education: University of Chile
- Occupation: Politician
- Political party: National Party

Juan Esteban Rodríguez Segura (24 April 1818 – 17 September 1901) was a Chilean lawyer, deputy, governor, and senator. He is widely believed to be the only son of the independence leader Manuel Rodríguez Erdoíza and the grandfather of former Chilean president Juan Esteban Montero Rodríguez.

== Early life and education ==
Rodríguez Segura was born on 24 April 1818 in Santiago, Chile. While his official birth records list José Luis Rodríguez as his father, multiple Chilean historians—including Gustavo Opazo Maturana, Armando de Ramón, and Manuel Balbontín—assert that he was the son of Manuel Rodríguez Erdoíza and Francisca de Paula Segura y Ruiz. Rodríguez Segura himself publicly acknowledged this parentage in 1875. Raised solely by his mother, he received his early education at the Instituto Nacional and later pursued law at the University of Chile, obtaining his law degree in 1853.

== Marriage and family ==
In 1842, Rodríguez Segura married Carmen Herrera Gallegos, a widow with extensive lands near Pumanque. After her death in 1853, he married her sister, Ignacia Herrera Gallegos, in 1855. Across both marriages, he had 14 children, including Juan Esteban Rodríguez Herrera.

== Political career ==
A member of the National Party, Rodríguez Segura began his political career as a deputy for Curicó in 1855. He subsequently served as deputy for Copiapó and Caldera (1861–1864), Linares (1864–1867), Talca (1873–1876), and Vichuquén (1876–1882). He was appointed Intendant of Copiapó (1856–1858) and Talca (1859–1864), where he was noted for implementing progressive public works. From 1882 to 1894, he served as senator for Curicó, participating in various commissions, including Education and Beneficence, and War and Navy. During the 1891 Chilean Civil War, he supported the congressional faction and was frequently consulted in the aftermath of President Balmaceda's fall.

== Later life and death ==
In his later years, Rodríguez Segura served as director of the Caja Hipotecaria de Chile, a precursor to BancoEstado. He died on 17 September 1901 in Santiago at the age of 83.

== Legacy ==
Rodríguez Segura's lineage includes his grandson, Juan Esteban Montero Rodríguez, who served as President of Chile from 1931 to 1932.
