= Miguel de Zañartu =

Chilean politician

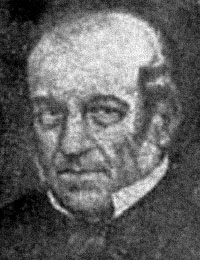
Miguel de Zañartu.

Miguel de Zañartu Santa María (1786 – 25 October 1851) was a Chilean politician and lawyer. During the Chilean Independence War he was a prominent Patriot being forced into exile to Mendoza in 1814 when the Patria Vieja fell to the Royalists. In 1817 he returned to Chile. Zañartu was among the signatories of the Chilean Declaration of Independence.
