= Chilean ship Blanco Encalada =

Several ships of the Chilean Navy have been named Blanco Encalada after Manuel Blanco Encalada (1790–1876), a Vice Admiral and Chile's first President

- Chilean frigate Blanco Encalada (1875), an Almirante Cochrane-class central battery ironclad launched in 1874 as the Valparaiso, renamed Blanco Encalada in 1890, and sunk by a torpedo in 1891 during the Chilean Civil War, it was the first warship to ever be sunk by a self-propelled torpedo
- Chilean cruiser Blanco Encalada (1893), a protected cruiser launched in 1893 and scrapped in 1946
- Chilean destroyer Blanco Encalada (14), a Fletcher-class destroyer, the former USS Wadleigh (DD-689), transferred to Chile in 1963, and scrapped in 1983
- Chilean destroyer Blanco Encalada (D15), a County-class destroyer, the former HMS Fife (D20), commissioned into the Chilean Navy in 1988, decommissioned in 2003, and scrapped in 2005
- Chilean frigate Almirante Blanco Encalada (FF-15), a Karel Doorman-class frigate, the former HNLMS Abraham van der Hulst (F832), was sold to Chile in 2004, and commissioned into the Chilean Navy in 2005
