= Battle of Cancha Rayada (1814) =

First battle of Cancha Rayada
- Part of the Chilean War of Independence
Date	29 March, 1814
Location	Cancha Rayada, near Talca
Result	Royalist victory

Belligerents
Chilean patriots	Royalists

Commanders and leaders
Manuel Blanco Encalada	Ángel Calvo

Strength
1,400	450

Casualties and losses
300 prisoners	Unknown

The first battle of Cancha Rayada, sometimes termed the 'Disaster' or 'Surprise of Cancha Rayada', took place on 29 March 1814, during the War of Chilean Independence.

== Background ==
A patriotic force, under the control of Manuel Blanco Encalada, a Chilean naval officer and later vice-admiral, had advanced towards the town of Talca, which was being held by the guerrilla leader Ángel Calvo. Calvo was a Chilean landowner, a former patriot who had switched sides to the Royalists during the Siege of Chillan the previous year.

== The battle ==
Manuel Blanco Encalada arrived in Quechereguas, where he received a note from Ángel Calvo proposing a site for the forthcoming battle. On the following day Manuel Blanco Encalada took up position and launched his attack. The battle seemed initially to be successful, but Royalist reinforcements rapidly forced him to retreat until he reached Cancha Rayada, where he finally confronted the Royalist advance. The patriot forces collapsed, and a large number of officials and several unit commanders fled back towards Santiago.

== Aftermath ==
Patriot commanders tried to regroup, but were taken prisoner along with many of their soldiers. In a quarter of an hour, 450 Royalists had defeated 1,400 patriotic soldiers, taking 300 prisoners, food, ammunition, and guns.
