= Ildefonso Elorreaga =

Spanish Army officer

Ildefonso Elorreaga (Álava, Spain; 1782 - † Chacabuco, Chile; February 12, 1817) was a Spanish Army officer who participated in the Chilean War of Independence.

Elorreaga was born in the town of Aspurú, in Spain, but arrived very young to Chile, settling in Concepción. He initially joined the Spanish Army, but left it soon after to marry Manuela Díaz de Salcedo and dedicate himself to commercial activities.

When Brigadier Antonio Pareja arrived in 1813 at the head of his expedition, he recruited Elorreaga as a cavalry militia commander. As such, he participated in almost all the battles of the Patria Vieja campaigns, being specially notable his capture of Talca and his participation at the Battle of Rancagua.

After the Spanish government had been reestablished, he was named District Chief of Coquimbo, and on November 13, 1816, Military Commander of Aconcagua. He died at the head of his troops during the Battle of Chacabuco.
