= 1812 Chilean constitutional referendum =

A referendum on Chile's provisional constitution was held on 27 October 1812. The provisional constitution, which was successfully adopted, was written by dictator José Miguel Carrera's administration. In the document, Chile declared itself sovereign, but recognized Ferdinand VII of Spain. It prohibited the then-current junta government from performing foreign (i.e. Spanish) commands, established a Senate with seven members, permitted only Roman Catholicism as the public and private religion, but recognized a number of other personal rights and freedoms.
