= Capture of Talca =

Battle occurred in the Chilean war of independence

- Part of the Chilean War of Independence
Date	3 March 1814
Location	Talca
Result	Royalist victory

Belligerents
Chilean patriots	(Spain) Royalists

Commanders and leaders
Carlos Spano †	(Spain) Ildefonso Elorreaga

Strength
120 men 3 guns	300 to 600 men

Casualties and losses
Substantial	Unknown

The Capture of Talca, occurred on 3 March 1814, during the War of Chilean Independence.

== Background ==
The town of Talca, held by the Patriotic forces under the command of Carlos Spano, had sent a military force Juan Rafael Bascuñán to the aid of Bernardo O'Higgins. This left the town relatively exposed, with only 300 men defending it. Gabino Gaínza, commanding the Royalist army had left a small force on the other side of the Maule river under the command of Ildefonso Elorreaga, but with orders not to attack Talca. Elorreaga, realising the Patriots' true situation, seized the opportunity and crossed the river, surprising the Patriots guarding the crossing points. He then advanced on Talca.

== The Attack ==
At 0700 on 3 March, Elorreaga sent an ultimatum to Spano to surrender Talca within fifteen minutes, or face destruction. Spano concluded he might be able to hold out long enough for Bascuñán's force to return and defend the town; sending an urgent message to Bascuñán, he arrayed all his forces, including his three artillery pieces, to defend the location. Elorreaga, knowing he had to take the town before Patriot reinforcements arrived, launched a ferocious attack.

The fighting went on all morning, but by noon the Royalist forces had managed to take and position themselves on the roof of the house of Vicente de la Cruz Bahamondes; a substantial and well positioned building, this enabled them to dominate the town. With this, the battle became a massacre. Spano was killed in the fighting and by the time Bascuñán arrived, the Royalists were in control of Talca.

== Aftermath ==
Bascuñán managed to save the money and materiel which Spano had sent with him originally, sending it to Curicó by the way of the coast. With the loss of Talca, O' Higgins and Mackenna had lost their key supply base, with both commanders divided and now surrounded by the enemy.
