= Battle of Pileu =

- Part of the Chilean War of Independence
Date	December 7, 1819
Location	Píleo, on the south bank of the Biobío River, across from Hualqui
Result	Royalist victory

Belligerents
(Chile) Chilean Army	(Spain) Royalists

Commanders and leaders
(Chile) Pedro Kurski †	(Spain) Vicente Benavides

Strength
50 cavalry	200

Casualties and losses
c. 45 killed	

The Battle of Pileu (December 7, 1819) was a minor engagement that took place between the forces of the nascent Chilean Army and Spanish royalist guerrillas, in the context of the guerra a meurte (lit. English: War to the death) campaign, during the later stages of the Chilean War of Independence, and resulted in a Royalist victory.

== Background ==
The main force of the Chilean Army, under General Ramón Freire, was defending the city of Concepción from the attacks of the Royalist guerrillas under the command of Vicente Benavides. As the city was under virtual siege, Freire ordered Captain Pedro Kurski and a company of 50 men to make a raid into the countryside and bring back some badly needed supplies to the food-starved city.

Captain Kurski left Concepción on December 6, crossed to the south bank of the Biobío River, travelled inland and discovered a herd of cattle that had been assembled there by the guerrillas. It was being kept in the area of Píleo across from the town of Hualqui, and guarded by 15 soldiers. On December 7, he carried an early morning surprise attack and killed all the Royalist garrison guarding it, taking over the animals. Kurski then started to drive them back to Concepción.

== The battle ==
As Kurski was making his way back to Concepción with the cattle, he met a 200 men-strong column of the troops of Benavides, which were moving back from San Pedro. Even though Kurski was already at one of the fords of the Biobío River, instead of moving across to safety he decided to stand his ground and wait for the attack. A furious battle ensued, and Kurski was able to repulse two frontal charges from the Royalist guerrillas. Emboldened by his early success, and believing himself on the verge of dispersing the guerrillas, Kurski made the mistake of charging with his troops. It was then that the reserve of the attacking forces were able to position themselves between Kurski's troops and the river ford which had until then protected their rear, cutting off any possible retreat.

Kurski, trapped between two fires was soon totally overwhelmed, so he and his troops decided to risk an escape across the river, because as was customary in this campaign neither side took prisoners and any surrendering troops were executed on the spot, usually in a barbaric fashion. Most of the retreating forces were carried away by the flow and drowned, including Kurski himself. Another version indicates that he was captured, tortured and mutilated (including cutting off his tongue) before being finally killed.

== Sources ==
- Barros Arana, Diego (1850). Estudios históricos sobre Vicente Benavides i las campañas del Sur: 1818-1822 (in Spanish). Santiago, Chile: Impr. de Julio Belin i Compañia.
- Castedo, Leopoldo (1954). Resumen de la Historia de Chile de Francisco Antonio Encina (in Spanish). Vol. 2. Santiago, Chile: Empresa Editora Zig-Zag.
- Vicuña Mackenna, Benjamín (1868). La guerra a muerte: memoria sobre las últimas campañas de la Independencia de Chile (1819-1824) (in Spanish). Santiago, Chile: Imprenta Nacional. p. 562.
- Archivo O'Higgins (in Spanish). Vol. II, XVI & XXI. Santiago, Chile: varias imprentas. 1946–1966.
