= Siege of Chillán =

- Part of the Chilean War of Independence
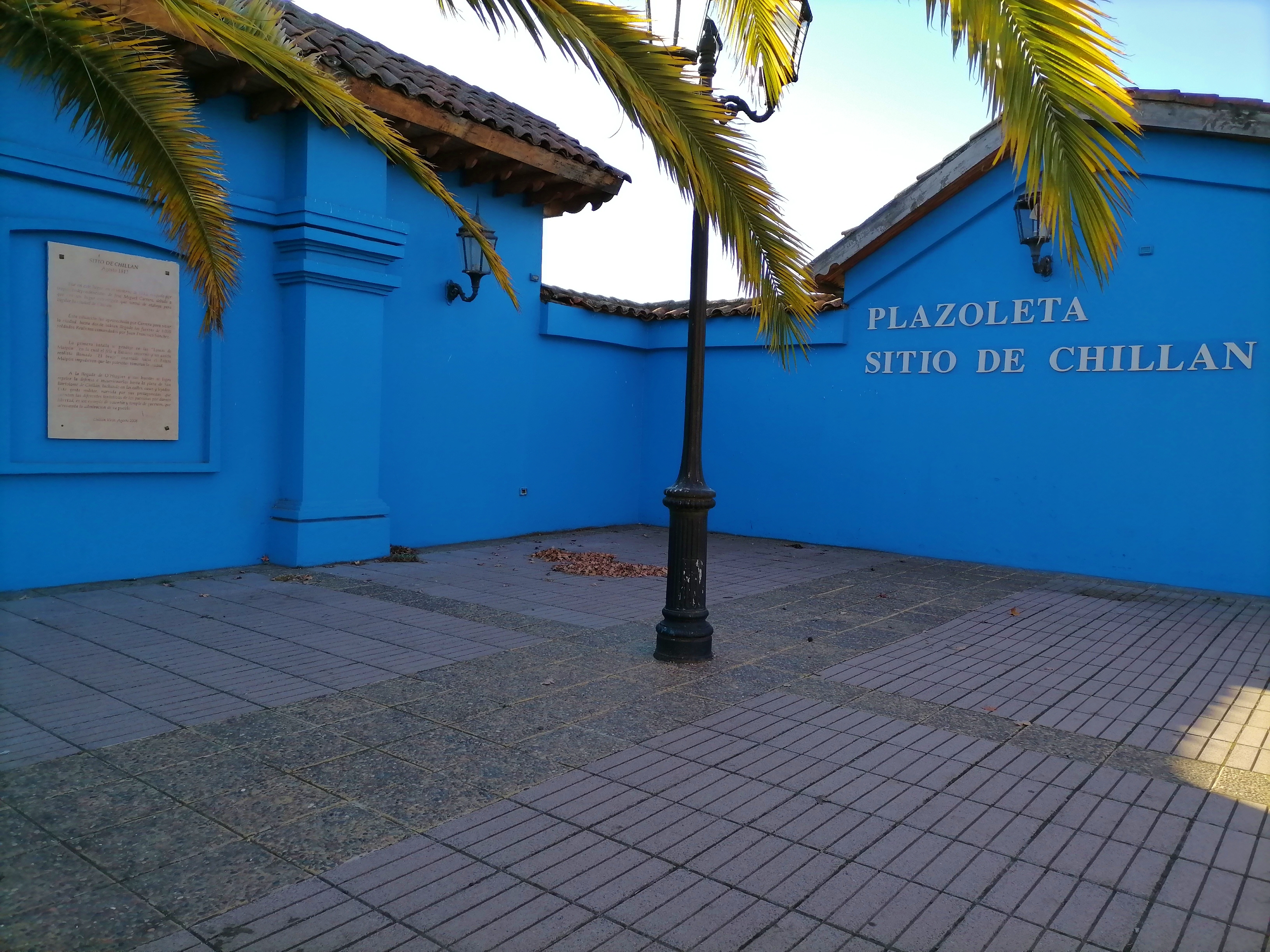
- Plaza marking the site of the Siege of Chillán
| Date | July 27 to August 10, 1813 |
| Location | Chillán Viejo 36°37′5.44″S 72°8′8.23″W |
| Result | Royalist victory |

Belligerents
| Chilean patriots | (Spain) Royalists |

Commanders and leaders
| José Miguel Carrera | (Spain) Juan Francisco Sánchez (Spain) José Antonio Pareja |

Strength
| Unknown | Unknown |

Casualties and losses
| Over 500 casualties and prisoners | Unknown |

The siege of Chillán in Chile occurred from July 27th to August 10th, 1813, as patriot forces attempted to dislodge a determined band of royalist defenders. The failure of José Miguel Carrera to take the city would contribute to his removal from office by the junta later in the campaign.

== Background ==
The city of Chillán was held by royalist troops under the command of Juan Francisco Sanchez, backed by forces under the command of Ildefonso Elorreaga and the Valdivian troops of Juan Nepomuceno Carvallo. Juan Francisco Sanchez had sent a message to Antonio Pareja for reinforcements as José Miguel Carrera began his siege. As a result, the governing body at Santiago instructed Carrera to try to take the city before these new royalist forces could arrive.

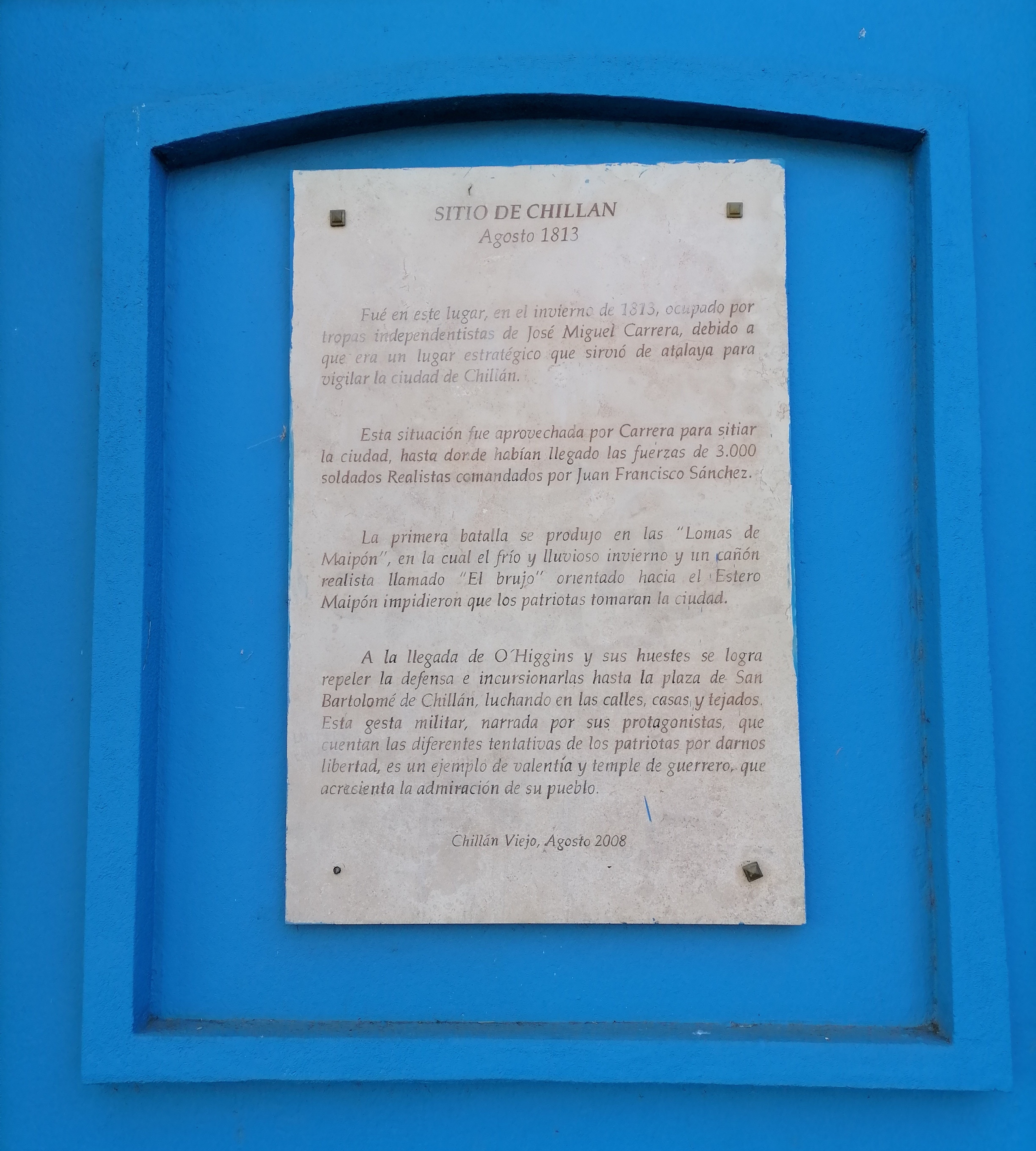
Plate located in the plaza marking the site of the siege of Chillán, on the corner of the Luis Arellanos and Velasquez streets, remembering the deaths in the battle of Maipón on August 5.

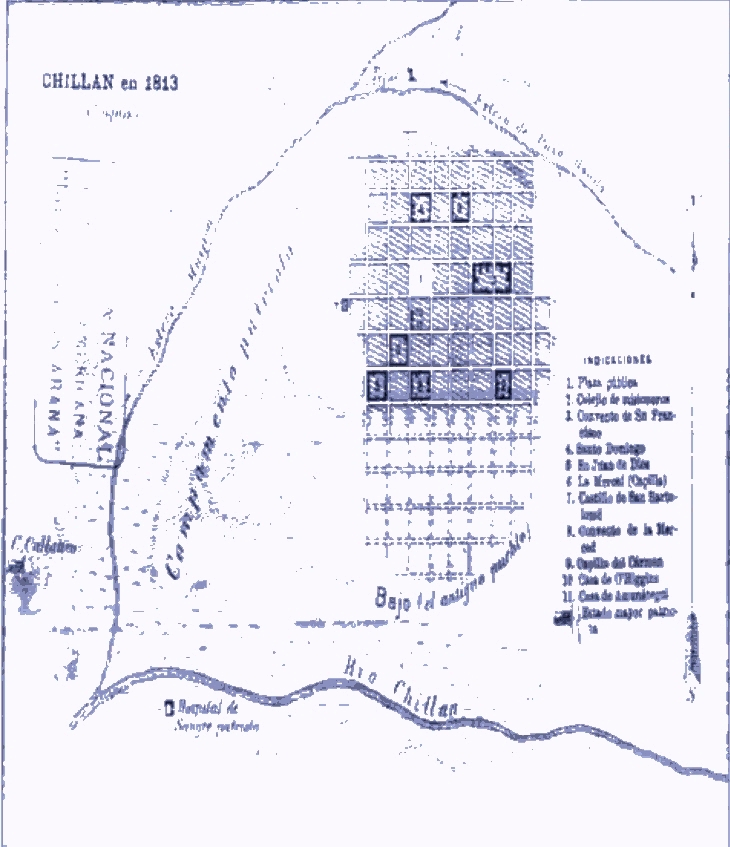
Sketch compiled by the patriots in the siege of Chillán, in 1813 July

== The siege ==
The patriot forces surrounding Chillán consisted of some of their best soldiers, but the siege was to take place in the midst of winter and in a difficult location. Old Chillán was a city of 4,000 inhabitants, now increased to 9,000 with Sanchez's royalist forces. It was located on an easily defensible hill between the rivers Paso Hondo, Maipón and Chillán.

By the time that Carrera arrived to take command of the siege, Joel Roberts Poinsett and Juan Mackenna had already compiled a plan showing the enemy fortifications and for the location of the artillery. Although the patriot troops were equipped with waterproof ponchos, the winter weather was so unpleasant and the patriot supplies so limited that Carrera was concerned about the timing of the campaign.

== The assault ==
As the days drew on, the patriot force began to suffer increasing numbers of deserters, and Carrera decided that a direct attack was needed before the entire patriot force disintegrated in the harsh winter conditions. The first attack, the battle of Maipón, occurred on August 3, with the second attack following two days later. The assaults were marred by the massacre of many of the civilian inhabitants of Chillán and numerous atrocities. The assaults failed, however, to take the city, where the royalist forces held on staunchly.

== Aftermath ==
Carrera had taken many casualties during these assaults, with his casualties and men taken prisoner numbering more than 500 men. His militia cavalry and some of the infantry had fled altogether, and without food and ammunition it was not going to be possible to hold the city perimeter. The only choice was to raise the siege on August 10 and retreat to Quirihue and Concepción. The failure of the siege of Chillán would begin to undermine the credibility of Carrera in the eyes of the leadership in Santiago.
