= Francisco Antonio Pérez =

Chilean politician

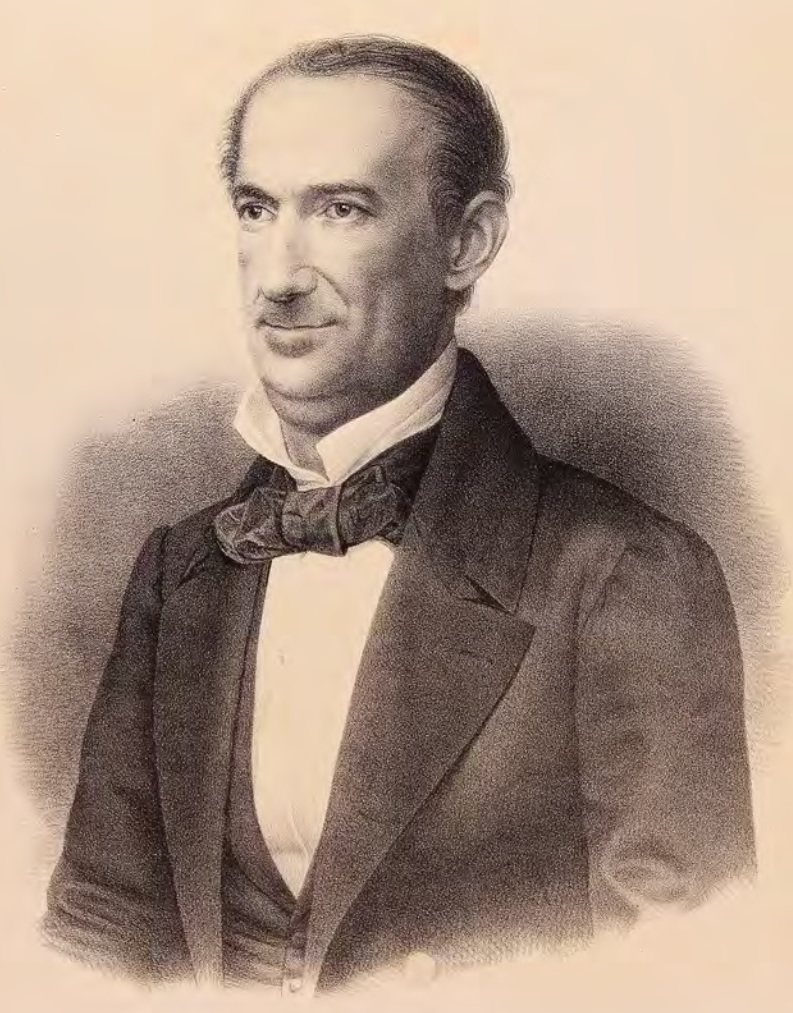

President of Government Junta
- In office April 13, 1813 – August 23, 1813
- Preceded by: José Miguel Carrera
- Succeeded by: José Miguel Infante

Personal details
- Born: Francisco Antonio Pérez Salas; 1764 Santiago, Captaincy General of Chile, Spanish Empire
- Died: November 10, 1828 (aged 63–64)

Francisco Antonio Pérez Salas (1764 – November 10, 1828) was a Chilean political figure. He served several times as member of different Government Juntas, and participated actively in the war of independence in that country.

He was born in Santiago, the son of José Pérez García and of Ana Josefa Ramirez de Salas y Pavón. Pérez studied law and was admitted to practice in colonial Chile. He was a member of the Government Junta established on April 13, 1813, together with Agustín Eyzaguirre and José Miguel Infante. He was president of the junta between April 13 and August 23, and remained a member until October 9 of the same year. He is one of the founders of the National Library of Chile.

During the period of the Spanish Reconquista, he was arrested and imprisoned in Juan Fernández island. After the battle of Chacabuco he was set free, and became a member and later the regent of the Justice Chamber. He was elected a Senator in 1822 and died in Santiago in 1828.

Political offices
| Preceded by José Miguel Carrera | President of Government Junta; 1813 | Succeeded by José Miguel Infante |
