= José Antonio Pareja =

Spanish Navy officer and colonial administrator (1757–1813)

Captain General of Chile
- In office 1812–1813
- Monarch: Ferdinand VII
- Preceded by: Francisco Antonio García Carrasco (as Royal Governor)
- Succeeded by: Juan Francisco Sánchez

Personal details
- Born: 7 December 1757 Cabra, Spain
- Died: 21 May 1813 (aged 55) Chillán, Chile
- Children: José Manuel Pareja

Military service
- Allegiance: Spain
- Branch/service: Spanish Navy
- Years of service: 1771–1813
- Rank: Brigadier
- Commands: San Agustín; Argonauta; San Justo
- Battles/wars: Siege of Melilla (1774); Invasion of Algiers (1775); American Revolutionary War; Battle of Cape Spartel; Anglo-Spanish War (1796–1808); Battle of Cape St Vincent (1797); Battle of Trafalgar (WIA); Chilean War of Independence; Battle of Yerbas Buenas; Siege of Chillán

Brigadier José Antonio de Pareja y Mariscal (7 December 1757 – 21 May 1813) was a Spanish Navy officer and colonial administrator who served as the Captain General of Chile from 1812 to 1813. He captained the Argonauta during the Battle of Trafalgar in 1805 and commanded Royalist troops during the Chilean War of Independence.

== Biography ==
=== Youth and early career ===
Pareja was born in Cabra, near Córdoba, Spain and was fascinated with the Navy from childhood. He enlisted as a midshipman in 1771 and sailed in several naval task forces, attending many actions. From February 1778 to May 1782 he commanded a frigate and a private vessel as well as a brig. He married Josepha Septien.

In 1782 Pareja had fought in the Battle of Cape Spartel and at Melilla, his ships on several occasions landing artillery, ammunition and food and at one point suffering a horrific fire. After the declaration of war against France, aboard the ship San Juan Nepomuceno he distinguished himself by taking the islands of San Pietro and Sant'Antioco and the Siege of the port of Toulon (July–December 1793 As commander of the frigate Perla he participated in the Battle of Cape St. Vincent on February 14, 1797. In the Bay of Algiers a galley under his command fired for eight hours at the Barbary corsairs.

=== Trafalgar ===
In 1803 Pareja commanded the ship San Agustín at the rank of ship-of-the-line captain and in February 1805 he acquired the ship of the Prince of Asturias and sailed to Cadiz with the combined fleets of France and Spain under the command of Vice-admiral Pierre-Charles Villeneuve and Lieutenant-general Federico Gravina. There he was given command of the Argonauta. On 20 October he sailed with the combined fleet of the same admirals, and found himself in combat against the a British fleet under Lord Nelson at the Battle of Trafalgar on 21 October. Argonauta suffered immense damage and sank the second day of the battle, which led to numerous deaths and injuries, including the injury of the Captain himself. Later that year Pareja was promoted to brigadier.

In June 1808, Pareja witnessed the capture of the Rosily Squadron. After a period of leave in Madrid he was sent back to the department of Cadiz in 1809. He then commanded the ships Terrible and San Justo and in early 1810 all the forces of the Isla de León.

=== Chile ===
Pareja commanded the island until July 1810 when he was appointed Governor and Captain-General of Chile, then in full insurrection. Pareja arrived in Lima in 1811 as Governor-Intendant of the Chilean province of Concepción. There was, however, a change in plan. At the directive of the José Fernando de Abascal, Viceroy of Peru, whose authority included the provinces of Chile, Pareja organized an expedition against Chiloé and Valdivia which had declared their independence. In late February 1813, Pareja gathered 2,400 men and took the little port of San Vicente, adjacent to Talcahuano. He then immediately marched upon Concepción, which he took possession of with the aid of the native militia. He augmented his forces to about 4,000 soldiers and at once marched upon Chillán which surrendered without a fight and swelled his army with another 2,000 soldiers.

In the meantime, Brigadier José Miguel Carrera, head of the Independentist government, had organized the resistance in Santiago. Both armies met at the Battle of Yerbas Buenas (April 27, 1813). The Independentists, who had attempted a night surprise, were forced to retreat. Pareja, sick with pneumonia, then decided to retreat himself back to Chillán. He was already so sick that he had to be carried on a stretcher. In Chillán he had to submit to a prolonged siege. While there, the port of Talcahuano was recaptured by the Independentists, who also managed to capture the frigate Tomas which was coming from Callao with re-enforcements. Pareja, already weakened by his pneumonia and aggrieved by these reverses, died shortly afterward. His command of the Royalist army was assumed by Juan Francisco Sánchez.

== Legacy ==
Pareja's son, Vice Admiral José Manuel Pareja (1813–1865) commanded the Spanish fleet during the Chincha Islands War (1864–1866).

== See also ==
- Chilean Independence

== Sources ==
This article incorporates material from Volume 42 of the Universal Illustrated European-American Encyclopedia (Espasa) (Enciclopedia Universal Ilustrada Europeo-Americana), which, with a pre-1929 copyright, is in the public domain.

Military offices
Preceded by Mateo de Toro Zambrano	Captain General of Chile; 1812-1813	Succeeded by Juan Francisco Sánchez
