= Manuel Blanco Encalada =

First President of Chile

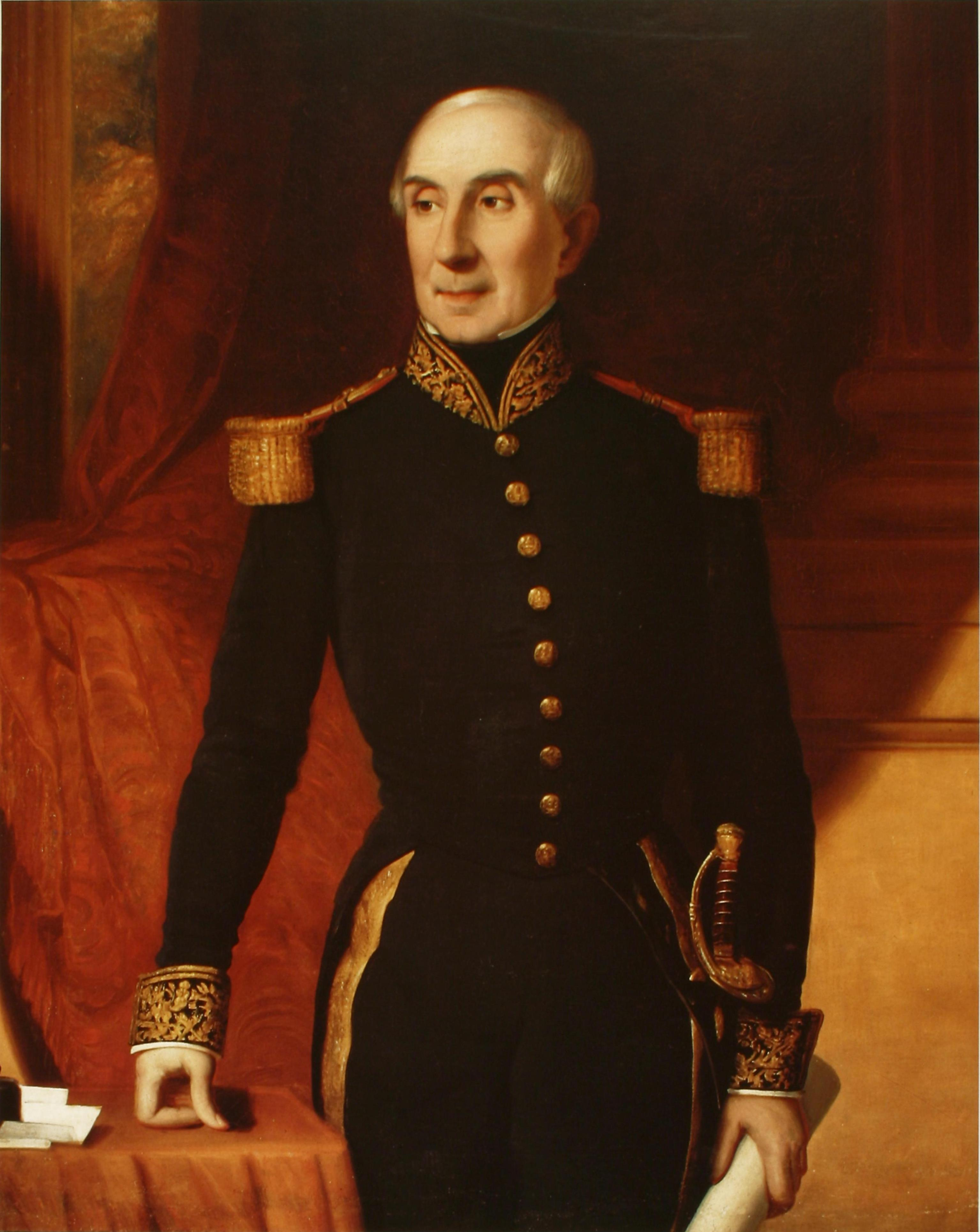

1st President of Chile
- In office 9 July 1826 – 9 September 1826
- Vice President: Agustín Eyzaguirre
- Preceded by: Ramón Freire (as Supreme Director of Chile)
- Succeeded by: Agustín Eyzaguirre (Ramón Freire as the 2nd)

Personal details
- Born: 21 April 1790 Buenos Aires, Viceroyalty of the Río de la Plata
- Died: 5 September 1876 (aged 86) Santiago, Chile
- Party: Independent
- Other political affiliations: Affiliated with the Pipiolos
- Spouse: Carmen Gana López (m. 1818)

Military service
- Battles/wars: Peninsular War; Capture of the Rosily Squadron; Siege of Cádiz; Chilean War of Independence; First Battle of Cancha Rayada; Second Battle of Cancha Rayada; Battle of Maipú; Battle of Bellavista; Peruvian War of Independence; Second siege of Callao; War of the Confederation; Chilean Civil War of 1851

Manuel José Blanco y Calvo de Encalada (Latin American Spanish: [maˈnwel ˈβlaŋko eŋkaˈlaða]; April 21, 1790 – September 5, 1876) was a vice-admiral in the Chilean Navy, a political figure, and Chile's first President (Provisional) (1826).

== Biography ==
Born in Buenos Aires, then the capital of the Viceroyalty of the Río de la Plata, Blanco Encalada was the son of the Spaniard Manuel Lorenzo Blanco Cicerón and the Chilean Mercedes Calvo de Encalada y Recabarren. He received his naval training in Spain.

During the Chilean War of Independence, he joined the Chilean patriot forces, serving under Lord Cochrane, and took part in several naval operations. He rose to the rank of vice admiral and, in 1825, commanded the Chilean forces that participated in the campaign leading to the capture of Chiloé.

In 1826, Congress elected him to the newly established office of President of the Republic. His brief administration was marked by conflicts with Congress, which sought to implement a federalist system. Facing increasing political tensions and lack of agreement, he resigned after two months in office.

Later, he took part in the war against the Peruvian-Bolivian Confederation and in the Spanish–South American War (1865–1866). After these conflicts, he served as governor of Valparaíso and as Chilean minister to France. He was also an active Freemason.

Blanco Encalada died in Santiago de Chile at the age of 86.

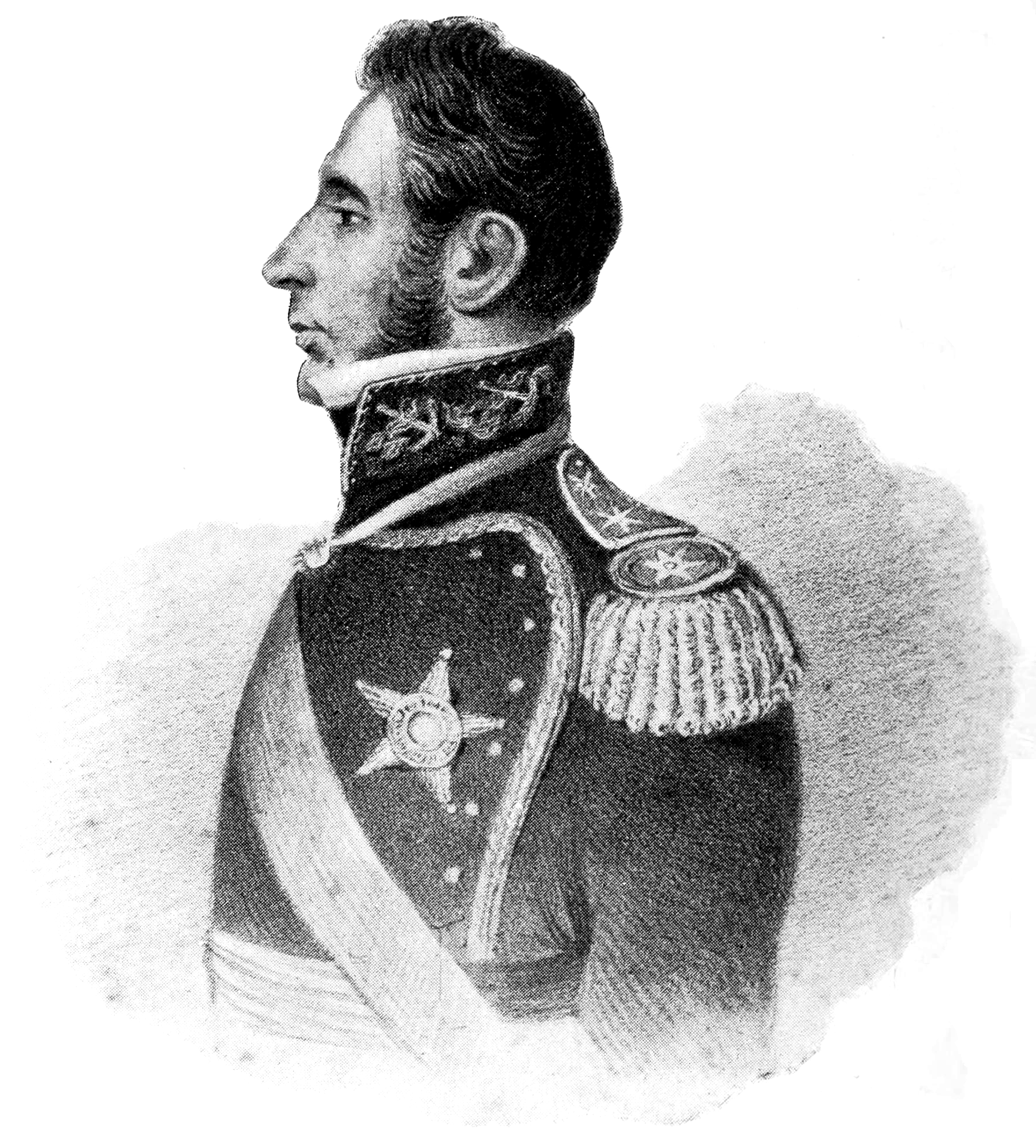
A young Encalada

== Cabinet ==
The Blanco Encalada Cabinet
Office	Name	Term
President	Manuel Blanco Encalada	9 July 1826–9 September 1826
Minister of Government & Foreign Affairs	Ventura Blanco Encalada	8 March 1826–20 October 1826
Minister of War & Navy	José María Novoa	8 March 1826–21 June 1826
Tomás Obejero	21 June 1826–26 September 1826
Minister of Finance	Manuel José Gandarillas	8 March 1826–12 September 1826

== See also ==
- See Chilean ship Blanco Encalada for the ships named in honor of Manuel Blanco Encalada.
- Ventura Blanco Encalada
- Biography (in Spanish)

Political offices
Preceded by Ramón Freire (last Supreme Director)	President of Chile; 1826	Succeeded by Agustín Eyzaguirre
Military offices
Preceded by Francisco de la Lastra	Navy General Commander; 1818–1821	Succeeded by José Ignacio Zenteno
Preceded by Santiago Aldunate	Navy General Commander; 1847–1852	Succeeded by Robert Simpson
