= Supreme Director of Chile =

Head of state of Chile in 1814, 1817–1826

- Director supremo/Supremo Director
- Seal of the "Supreme Director of the Chilean State"

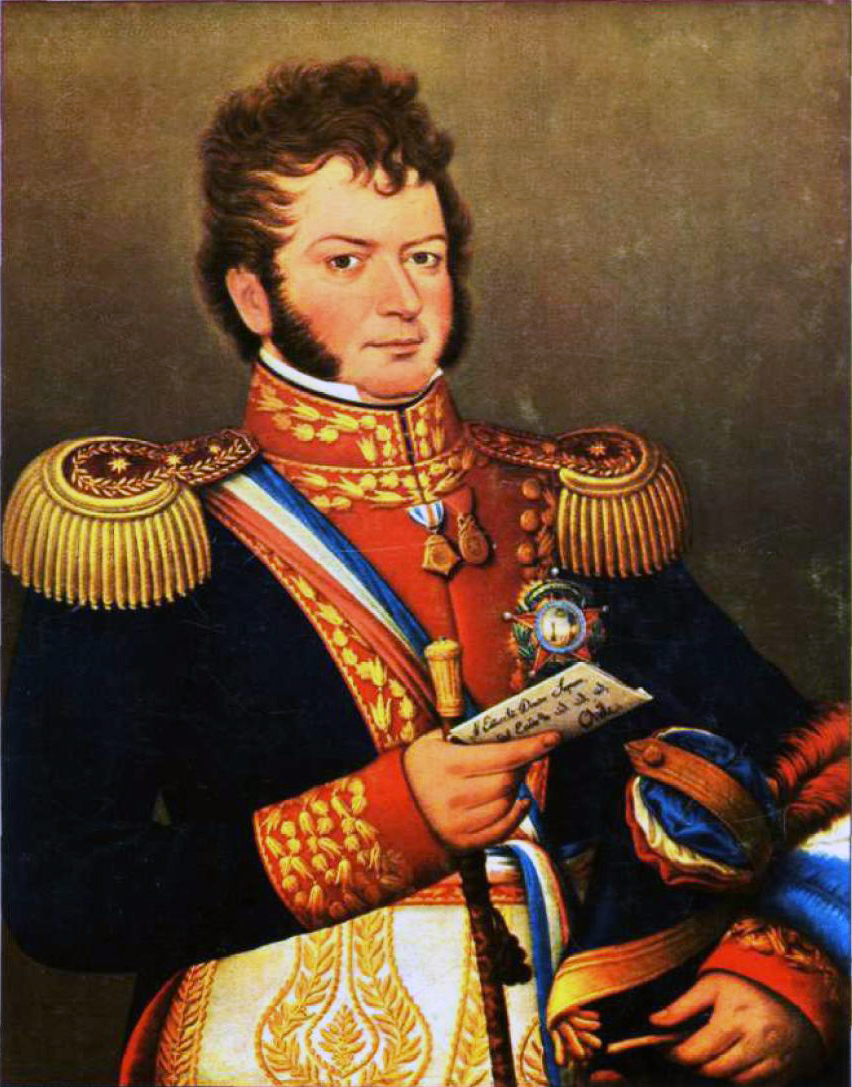
- Longest serving Bernardo O'Higgins; 16 February 1817 – 28 January 1823
- Style: His Excellency
- Precursor: President of the National Government Junta of Chile
- Formation: 7 March 1814
- First holder: Antonio José de Irisarri
- Final holder: Ramón Freire
- Abolished: 9 July 1826
- Succession: President of Chile

The supreme director of Chile was the head of state and government of Chile in the periods of 1814 and 1817–1826.

The first supreme director was Francisco de la Lastra, but before him Antonio José de Irisarri had served for 7 days as interim supreme director, the last person to hold the title was Ramón Freire.

== History of the position ==
=== Old Fatherland (1814) ===
In 1814 due to Royalist advances, the National Government Junta was dissolved with the intention of establishing a new title which would concentrate all the faculties of the Junta and its President in a single person and therefore help to coordinate more easily the Independentist forces against the Royalists; a Consultative Senate was also established.

On March 7 Francisco de la Lastra was proclaimed as the first supreme director but as he was in Valparaíso and not in Santiago at the time, the Guatemalan Antonio José de Irisarri assumed as interim supreme director for seven days, until March 14 when de la Lastra finally arrived at Santiago.

The Regulation of the Provisional Government of 1814 established that:

“Article 1°. The critical circumstances of the day compel us to concentrate the Executive Power on a single individual, with the title of Supreme Director, as in him reside all faculties that the Government Junta had since its installation on September 18, 1810. Article 2°. Therefore his faculties are extensive and unlimited, with the exception of peace treaties, war declarations, the establishment of trade, and taxes or general public contributions, in which necessarily he will consult and reach an agreement with his Senate."

The supreme director was to last 18 months on the position with possibility of extension by agreement of the Municipality and the Senate.

On July 23, 1814, at 03:00 A.M, former President of the Government Junta general José Miguel Carrera led a coup d'état together with the Catholic Priest, Julián Uribe (who was in command of the artillery) which deposed de la Lastra, abolished de Directorial system and installed a new Government Junta with Carrera as its President.

=== New Fatherland (1817-1823) ===
In 1817 after the Royalist defeat at the Battle of Chacabuco Bernardo O'Higgins was proclaimed as Supreme Director de facto, he became Supreme Director de jure once the Provisional Constitution of 1818 was promulgated and confirmed him as such.

The Constitution established that:

"The Supreme Director will hold the Executive Power in the entire territory. His election has already been confirmed according to the circumstances of what has happened; but in the future it must be done upon the free consent of the provinces, according to the regulation that will be written for that purpose by the Legislature"

=== Organization of the Republic (1823-1826) ===
By the beginning of January 1823, general Ramón Freire intendant of Concepción and Chief of the Army of the South marched with his troops towards Santiago, in January 28 O'Higgins renounced as Supreme Director and a Provisional Government Junta was established, led by Agustín de Eyzaguirre Arechavala who previously in 1813 had already served as President of the Government Junta. Freire and his troops were already in Valparaíso, near Santiago were they refused to recognise the new government and marched towards the capital. Eventually Freire was proclaimed as Supreme Director on August 18, he would hold that position until July 9, 1826 when Manuel Blanco Encalada became the first President of the Republic.

Under the Directorate of Freire, a new Constitution, that of 1823, was promulgated, according to the aforementioned Constitution:

"A citizen with the title of Supreme Director administers the State in accordance with the laws and exercises exclusively the Executive Power. It will last for four years: being able to be re-elected a second time by two-thirds of the votes."

== List ==
Political parties

Independent
Pelucones
Pipiolos

No.	Portrait	Name (Born-Died)	Term			Political Party	Election	Ref.
No.	Portrait	Name (Born-Died)	Took office	Left office	Duration	Political Party	Election	Ref.
1	Antonio José de Irisarri	Antonio José de Irisarri (1786–1868)	7 March 1814	14 March 1814	7 days	Independent	–	
2	Francisco de la Lastra	Francisco de la Lastra (1777–1852)	14 March 1814	23 July 1814	131 days	Independent	–	–
Spanish Reconquest (1814–1817)
4	Francisco Ruiz-Tagle	Francisco Ruiz-Tagle (1790–1860)	12 February 1817	16 February 1817	4 days	Pelucones	–	–
5	Bernardo O'Higgins	Bernardo O'Higgins (1778–1842)	16 February 1817	28 January 1823	5 years, 346 days	Independent	–	
6	Agustín Eyzaguirre	Agustín Eyzaguirre (1768–1837)	28 January 1823	4 April 1823	66 days	Independent	1822	
7	Ramón Freire	Ramón Freire (1787–1851)	4 April 1823	9 July 1826	3 years, 96 days	Pipiolos	1823	

== See also ==
- President of Chile
