= Scorpion scandal =

1809 scandal in Chile

The Scorpion scandal (1809) was a smuggling, criminal and political scandal that caused the downfall of the Spanish Royal Governor of Chile, and hastened the Independence movement in that country.

== Background ==
During the entire colonial period, Spain maintained a very strict monopoly on international commerce with its American Empire. In 1808, the British whaling ship Scorpion, under the command of Captain Tristan Bunker, arrived at the Chilean coast with the stated purpose of whaling. The real purpose of the trip was to smuggle into the colony a very valuable consignment of British cloth that the ship was carrying in its hull. To this purpose, Captain Bunker contacted Henry Faulkner, an American medical doctor then living in the city of Quillota.

The Scorpion was just one of many ships trading contraband English fabrics on the Pacific coast. In 1807 the British Government, at the urging of the parliamentarian William Jacob, had modified the monopoly of the South Sea Company so that vessels were permitted to enter the Pacific Ocean via Cape Horn. This incentive had been created as part of Britain's goal of challenging Spain's dominance of Central and South America. The short but failed invasion of the Rio de Plata in 1806-1807 had encouraged this approach.

Captain Bunker, though commanding a British merchant sailing ship, was a North American, born and raised on Nantucket Island, Massachusetts. Many Nantucket whaling families had relocated to Britain in the 1790s at the urging of the English government and William Rotch to establish a whale oil industry. Pacific Ocean whaling was then known as the Southern Fishery.

Faulkner and Bunker reached an agreement, and the captain was to deliver the goods at the Topocalma Hacienda that was owned by one José Fuenzalida. The agreed price was 80,000 pesos of the time, a small fortune. Don Francisco Antonio de la Carrera, Royal Delegate of Colchagua, with jurisdiction over Topocalma, got wind of the scheme and decided to intervene.

Fuenzalida, De la Carrera and Faulkner conspired together and decided to hijack the cargo. To achieve their plans they needed enough force to strongarm Captain Bunker and his crew. To that purpose, they contacted Royal Governor Francisco Antonio García Carrasco. The Governor and his secretary, Juan Martínez de Rozas, agreed to provide a squadron of Dragones (police) in exchange for 85% of the profits, and of course without notification to the Royal Customs Office.

On September 25, 1808, at Topocalma Bay, three conspirators (the butler of the Marquis of Larraín, the representative of De la Carrera and Dr. Faulkner) boarded the Scorpion to finalize the deal. The payment was to be made in copper ingots. While the representatives held their talks with the captain, the copper was loaded by Dragones disguised as porters.

After the copper was loaded, the captain and eight of his sailors were invited to a banquet on shore, at the hacienda houses. During the meal, after a prearranged signal, Captain Bunker and his sailors were shot and murdered. Then the Dragones boarded and proceeded to take over the frigate and its cargo.

== Aftermath and importance ==
The facts came to light very quickly afterwards, and caused a very violent reaction. The populace tried to lynch all the participants, who were miraculously saved by being arrested and put under permanent armed guard. In Santiago all the anger was directed against Governor García Carrasco and his secretary Martínez de Rozas; both men in a very short time accumulated a large number of legal suits against them, while public riots erupted. Martínez de Rozas had to resign and hide in Concepción.

The subsequent investigation destroyed what little authority the governor had left, and less than a year later required his surrender of the post to Mateo de Toro Zambrano, giving way to the first Chilean attempt at self-government.

The events that the Scorpion participated in took many decades to resolve. The English firm of Hullett successfully sued the King of Spain for financial losses. The case was finally resolved in the Privy Council in the 1830s.

== See also ==
- Chilean political scandals
- Economic history of Chile
