= Pedro Balmaceda =

Chilean writer and journalist

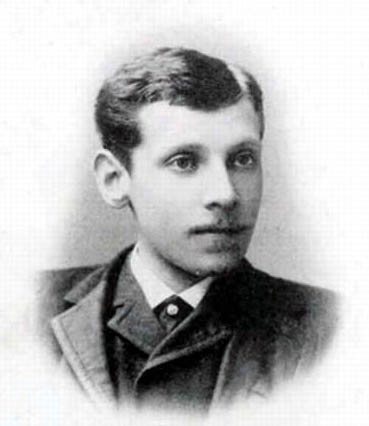
- Balmaceda in 1887
- Born: Pedro Balmaceda Toro; 27 February 1868; Santiago, Chile
- Died: 1 June 1889 (aged 21); Santiago, Chile
- Occupations: Writer; journalist
- Father: José Manuel Balmaceda
- Relatives: Enrique Balmaceda (brother); Emilio Bello Codesido (brother-in-law); Mateo de Toro Zambrano (great-grandfather)
- Family: Balmaceda
- Writing career
- Pen name: A. de Gilbert; Jean de Luçon
- Literary movement: Modernismo

Pedro Balmaceda Toro (1868 – June 1, 1889) was a Chilean writer and journalist, considered the promoter of the Modernismo school in Latin America.

== Life and career ==
He was born in Santiago, the son of José Manuel Balmaceda Fernández and of Emilia de Toro. Balmaceda was of Basque descent. Since a very early age he suffered from a severe spinal deformation when his nanny accidentally dropped him while he was just a few months old. This deformity was compounded with a heart ailment that eventually caused his death. His physical infirmities permeated his vision of the world and gave him a high regard for physical beauty that was to shape his writings.

He was fluent in Greek and French, collected classic books and French magazines (specially the Nouvelle Revue and the Revue des deux mondes), original works of art, silks and Chinese screens. He was a fervent admirer of French culture, without having ever set foot in France. His favorite musician was Chopin, and he was a very good piano player himself. He was also an avid reader of Théophile Gautier, Alfred de Musset and Paul de Saint Victor, and in his writings he used two pseudonyms: A. de Gilbert and Jean de Luçon; in short, he surrounded himself with an aura of decadent beauty, very similar to the symbolism that was his inspiration.

His importance though is not to be found in his writings, but in his ability to identify and promote new artistic talents. His salons, some of which were held at his private apartments, some at the presidential palace of La Moneda while his father was president, were the most important cultural gathering points of the time. He also promoted the creation of the old Ateneo de Santiago. In 1886, he met Rubén Darío, then a lonely, awkward, poor and unemployed 19-year-old immigrant, at the editorial room of the La Epoca newspaper, where he was a collaborator, and soon both became fast friends. From the very beginning Balmaceda became his mentor and protector. He introduced Darío to the Parnassian and Symbolist poets in his library: Leconte de Lisle, Catulle Mendes, Gautier, Baudelaire and Verlaine. He financed the publication of his book Abrojos (1887), and was the main support behind Azul (1888).

He died in Santiago on June 1, 1889, at the age of 21. After his death, his newspaper articles were collected by Manuel Rodríguez Mendoza into a volume called Studies and Literary Essays. Darío was in El Salvador when he learned of his death, and wrote a short tale in his memory:The death of the Empress of China (Spanish: La muerte de la Emperatriz de China) and an essay in book form: A. de Gilbert.

== Additional information ==
=== See also ===
- Balmaceda family
