= Francisco Tadeo Diez de Medina =

Francisco Tadeo Díez de Medina y Vidango (in other sources: Díez de Medina Vidanges; La Paz, today Bolivia, 1725 - Santiago de Chile, 10 August 1803) was a South American administrator and judge in the Spanish colonial administration. Between 1801 and 1802, he ruled the General Captaincy of Chile as Governor for a few weeks.

== Biography ==
Díez de Medina came from a wealthy local Criollo upper-class family and increased his wealth through active trade. He studied at the University of San Francisco Xavier in what is now Sucre. He later served as Mayor (Spanish: alcalde) of La Paz. There he also worked as a judge. He lived in the Palacio Diez de Medina, which is today the National Museum of Art, La Paz.

When the uprising of Túpac Katari against the Spanish colonial rulers was suppressed in 1781, Díez de Medina was the responsible judge who ordered death by quartering.

From 1801 (at the age of 76), he served as judge (Oidor) at the Real Audiencia of Chile. When the Governor of Chile, José de Santiago Concha Jiménez Lobatón was recalled to Buenos Aires, Tadeo Diez replaced him for a few weeks (from December 1801 to January 1802), until his successor, Luis Muñoz de Guzmán, appointed by King Charles IV, arrived from Lima to take office.

In February 1803, Tadeo Diez became semi-paralyzed and seriously affected by smallpox, so he no longer attended court. He died a few months later.

== Sources ==
- Real Academia de la Historia

Government offices
Preceded by José de Santiago	Royal Governor of Chile (acting); December 1801–January 1802	Succeeded by Luis Muñoz de Guzmán
