= Balmaceda family =

Chilean political family of Basque descent

- Chilean political family
- Arms of the Balmaceda family
- Country: Chile
- Place of origin: Basque Country

The Balmaceda family of Chile became politically influential during the 19th century, and played a significant role in Chilean politics. The Balmaceda family is of Basque descent. They are members of the Castilian-Basque aristocracy in Chile.

== Main branch ==
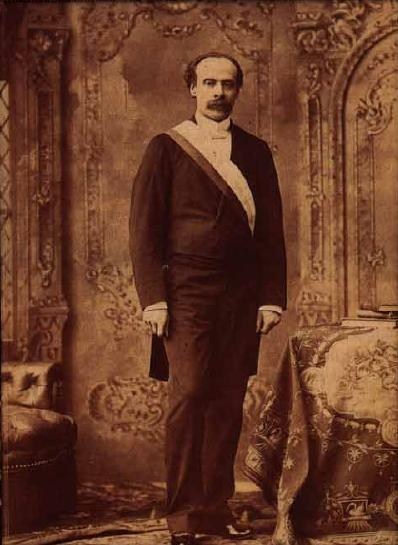
José Manuel Balmaceda. President of Chile 1886-1891.

- Manuel José de Balmaceda Ballesteros (1803–1869), landowner and Liberal Party politician; married María Encarnación Fernández Salas.
  - José Manuel Balmaceda Fernández (1840–1891), Liberal Party politician, 10th President of Chile and farmer; married Emilia de Toro.
    - Pedro Balmaceda Toro (1868–1889), poet and editor
    - José Enrique Balmaceda Toro (1878–1962), politician and diplomat.
  - José Vicente Balmaceda Fernández (1845–1920), farmer, politician and soldier; married Virginia Zañartu Rivera (1849-1896).
  - José María Balmaceda Fernández (1846–1899), farmer and politician; married Amelia Saavedra Rivera.
    - Carlos Balmaceda Saavedra (1879–1958), agricultural engineer and Liberal Democratic politician; married Marta Lazcano Valdés.
  - José Elías Balmaceda Fernández (1849–1917), politician, poet and farmer.
  - José Rafael del Carmen Balmaceda Fernández (1850–1911), politician and diplomat; married Ana Bello Codesido.
    - Ernesto Balmaceda Bello (1887–1906), diplomat and murder victim
  - José Exequiel Balmaceda Fernández (1851–1887), politician and diplomat; married Adela Pérez Eatsman.
  - José Ramón Balmaceda Fernández (1856–1926); married Elisa Valdés del Solar Eastman.
    - Gustavo Balmaceda Valdés (1883–1924) writer; married Teresa Wilms Montt.
  - José Daniel Balmaceda Fernández (1861–1905), farmer and politician; married Trinidad Fontecilla Sánchez.
    - Ester Balmaceda Fontecilla; married Arturo Marín Vicuña
      - Raúl Marín Balmaceda (1907–1957), lawyer and politician.

== Other notable members ==
- Manuel Montt Balmaceda (1925–2022) lawyer, academic, writer, the founder and rector of Diego Portales University
- Marta Montt Balmaceda (1934–2019), model and dancer
- José Julio Balmaceda Bravo (1954), business journalist and entrepreneur
- Gustavo Alessandri Balmaceda (1961) National Renewal politician and businessperson; great-grandnephew of José Manuel Balmaceda Fernández and Arturo Alessandri, and grandnephew of Jorge Alessandri; married Soledad Bascuñán Rodríguez.
- Javiera Balmaceda (1972), Chilean American film producer; married Fernando Gastón
- José Pedro Balmaceda Pascal (1975), Chilean American actor
- Lux Balmaceda Pascal (1992), Chilean American actress and transgender activist
- Patricio Balmaceda Tafra (2002), Chilean Croatian lawyer and entrepreneur

== See also ==
- History of Chile
