= Gregorio José de Toro, 2nd Count of La Conquista =

The Most Illustrious Gregorio José de Toro-Zambrano y Valdés Caballero de Santiago
- 2nd Count of La Conquista
- Full name: Gregorio José de Toro-Zambrano y Valdés
- Born: March 11, 1758; Santiago de Chile
- Baptised: 1758; Santiago de Chile
- Died: 23 July 1816 (aged 58); Santiago de Chile
- Noble family: Toro
- Spouse: Josefa Dumont de Holdre y Miquel
- Issue: Manuel María de Toro, 3rd Count of La Conquista; José de Toro; María Nicolasa de Toro, 4th Countess of La Conquista
- Father: Mateo de Toro Zambrano, 1st Count of La Conquista
- Mother: María Nicolasa Valdés y de la Carrera

Gregorio José de Toro-Zambrano y Valdés, 2nd Count of La Conquista (March 11, 1758 – July 23, 1816) was a Spanish-Chilean nobleman who commanded Royalist troops during the Chilean War of Independence.

== Life ==
Gregorio José de Toro-Zambrano y Valdés was born in Santiago, Chile, the second son of Mateo de Toro Zambrano, 1st Count of La Conquista and of his wife, María Nicolasa de Valdés y de la Carrera. He joined the Royal Spanish Army, and on December 30, 1769, he became a captain in the Militia Company of the Prince of Asturias. Shortly afterwards he was sent to Spain to study at the Seminary of Noblemen in Madrid. He continued his military career there until becoming a lieutenant colonel. On August 2, 1783, he was made a knight of the Order of Santiago.

In 1797 he married Josefa Dumont de Holdre y Miquel, daughter of Marshal Teodoro Dumont de Holdre and of Mariana Miquel y Lluis, and they had 3 children: Manuel María, José and María Nicolasa. The family returned to Chile in 1804.

On September 18, 1810, he participated of the open Cabildo (city hall) that resulted in the establishment of the Government Junta of the Kingdom of Chile under the presidency of his father, also known as the First Junta, an action which is generally seen as the first step of the Chilean independence process. From the beginning he was a member of the royalist party, the most conservative group that was against any reform at all and for the maintenance of the status quo.

He inherited the title at the death of his father a few months later, on February 27, 1811. He fought with the Spanish Army against independence, and died in Santiago in 1816. Was in turn succeeded to the title by his eldest son, Manuel María.

== Additional information ==
=== See also ===
- Chilean Independence

=== Sources ===
- Medina, José Toribio (1906). Diccionario Biográfico Colonial de Chile (PDF) (in Spanish). Santiago, Chile: Imprenta Elzeviriana. pp. 868–869.
- Pilleux Cepeda, Mauricio. "Recopilación de Genealogia Chilena" (in Spanish).

Spanish nobility
Preceded by Mateo de Toro Zambrano	Count of La Conquista; 1811–1816	Succeeded by Manuel María de Toro
