= José Manuel Balmaceda =

10th President of Chile (1886–91)

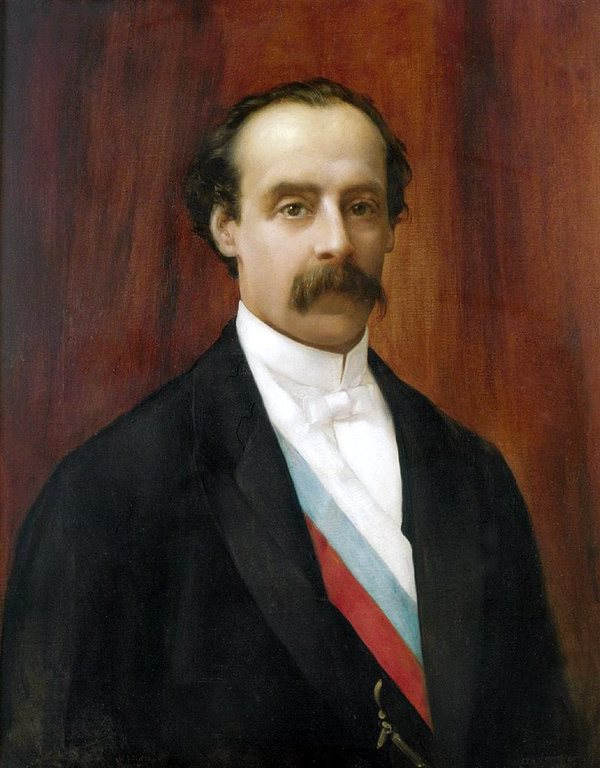
- Fernando Laroche (1891) Retrato de José Manuel Balmaceda Fernández

11th President of Chile
- In office 18 September 1886 – 29 August 1891
- Preceded by: Domingo Santa María
- Succeeded by: Manuel Baquedano

Personal details
- Born: 19 July 1840 Hacienda Bucalemu, Santo Domingo, Chile
- Died: 19 September 1891 Santiago, Chile
- Cause of death: Suicide by firearm
- Party: Liberal
- Spouse: Emilia de Toro (m. 1865)
- Relations: José Rafael Balmaceda (brother); Emilio Bello Codesido (son-in-law)
- Children: 8, including Pedro Balmaceda; Enrique Balmaceda

José Manuel Emiliano Balmaceda Fernández (Latin American Spanish: [maˈnwel βalmaˈseða]; July 19, 1840 – September 19, 1891) was a Chilean politician who served as the 11th President of Chile from 18 September 1886 to 29 August 1891. A controversial figure, Balmaceda's political disagreements with the Chilean congress led to the 1891 Chilean Civil War. Following the government forces' defeat at the Battle of Placilla, Balmaceda took refuge in the Argentine embassy where he later died by suicide.

== Early life and education ==
Balmaceda was born on 19 July 1840 at the Hacienda Bucalemu in Santo Domingo to Manuel de Balmaceda Ballesteros, a landowner and parliamentarian, and Encarnación Fernández Salas. Through his father Balmaceda was a member of the aristocratic Balmaceda family. The eldest of twelve children, Balmaceda was the older brother of José María Balmaceda Fernández, José Rafael Balmaceda, José Elías Balmaceda Fernández and José Daniel Balmaceda Fernández.

In 1849, Balmaceda enrolled at the Colegio de los Sagrados Corazones de Santiago as a boarder. Balmaceda later studied theology at the Seminario Conciliar de Santiago.

He considered joining the priesthood, but opted against it after being exposed to the ideas of the Enlightenment.

== Career ==
In 1864 he became secretary to Manuel Montt, who was one of the representatives of the Chilean government at the general South American congress at Lima, and after his return obtained great distinction as an orator in the national assembly. In 1868 he joined forces with Justo Arteaga Alemparte and Domingo Arteaga Alemparte to found and publish the newspaper "La Libertad" (Freedom). He also was a constant contributor to the "Revista de Santiago", and published two monographs: "The political solution in electoral freedom" and "Church and State". In 1869 he joined the Club de la Reforma, which became the political basis of the Liberal Party. The essential tenets of the political program were freedom of religion, increased personal and political freedom, elimination of governmental intervention in the electoral process, reform of the 1833 constitution and restriction of the powers of the President.

On the basis of this radical program, he was elected Deputy for Carelmapu several times: 1864–1867; 1870–1873; 1873–1876; 1876–1879; 1879–1882. Under President Aníbal Pinto, he discharged some diplomatic missions abroad, and is credited with persuading Argentina not to join the War of the Pacific in 1878. In 1882 he was re-elected both for Carelmapu and Santiago. He decided to accept neither and became instead successively Minister of Foreign Affairs and Colonization and of the Interior under the presidency of Domingo Santa María . As Minister of the Interior, Balmaceda implemented President Santa María’s reforms, including compulsory civil marriage and other measures that ensured religious freedom and allowed people of any faith to be buried in cemeteries previously reserved for Catholics. These laws, highly obnoxious to conservatives and the clergy , earned him their intense hostility. Balmaceda was also elected a Senator for Coquimbo (1882–1888). He was proclaimed a candidate to the presidency on the Odeon Theater of Valparaíso on January 17, 1886, with the support of the Nacional, Liberal and part of the Radical Parties. On June 25 he was elected president as sole candidate.

== Presidency ==
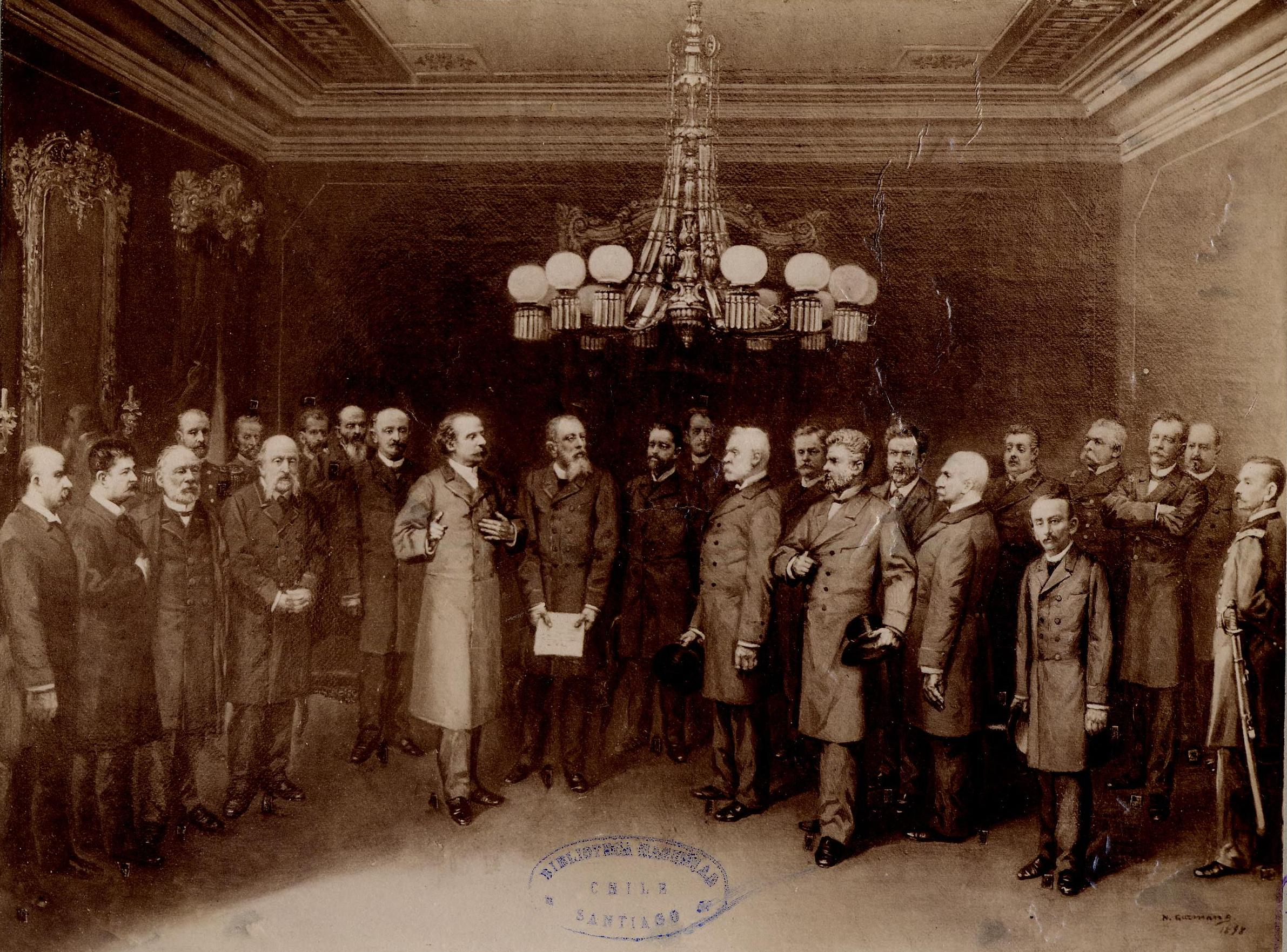
Meeting of notables in the Theater of Santiago with President José Manuel Balmaceda by Nicolás Guzmán Bustamante

Balmaceda became President of Chile on September 18, 1886, following the 1886 election, with 98 percent of the vote. His election was bitterly opposed by the Conservatives and dissident Liberals, but was finally achieved by the official influence of President Domingo Santa María. The election was not free and fair. Opposition candidate José Francisco Vergara withdrew his candidacy before the final votes were counted. In assuming office President Balmaceda endeavoured to bring about a reconciliation of all sections of the Liberal Party in Congress and so form a solid majority to support the administration, and to this end he nominated representatives of the different political groups as ministers. Six months later the cabinet was reorganized, and two of the most bitter opponents of his election were accorded portfolios. But despite his great capacity, Balmaceda's imperious temper little fitted him for the post.

Balmaceda instituted wide-reaching reforms, believing that he had now secured the support of the majority in Congress for any measures he decided to put forward. The new president initiated an unparalleled policy of heavy expenditure on public works, school building, and the strengthening of the naval and military forces of the republic. Contracts were given out to the value of £6,000,000 for the construction of railways in the southern districts; some $10,000,000 were expended in the erection of schools and colleges; three cruisers and two seagoing torpedo boats were added to the Navy; the construction of the naval port at Talcahuano was actively pushed forward; new armament was purchased for the infantry and artillery branches of the Army, and heavy guns were acquired for permanently and strongly fortifying the ports of Valparaíso, Talcahuano, and Iquique.

In itself this policy was not unreasonable, and in many ways extremely beneficial for the country. Unfortunately corruption crept into the expenditure of the large sums involved. Contracts were given by favour and not by merit, and the progress made in the construction of the new public works was far from satisfactory. The opposition in Congress to President Balmaceda began to increase rapidly towards the close of 1887, and further gained ground in 1888. In order to ensure a majority favourable to his views, the President threw the whole weight of his official influence into the elections for Senators and Deputies in 1888; but many of the members returned to the chambers through this official influence joined the opposition shortly after taking their seats.

=== Conflict with Congress ===
In 1889 Congress became distinctly hostile to the administration of President Balmaceda, and the political situation became grave, and at times threatened to involve the country in civil war. According to usage and custom in Chile at the time, a ministry (the set of ministers) did not remain in office unless supported by a majority in the chambers. Balmaceda now found himself in the impossible position of being unable to appoint ministers that would be supported by a majority in the Senate and Chamber of Deputies and at the same time be in accordance with his policies. At this juncture the President assumed that the constitution gave him the power of nominating and maintaining in office any ministers he might consider fitting persons for the purpose, and that Congress had no right of interference in the matter.

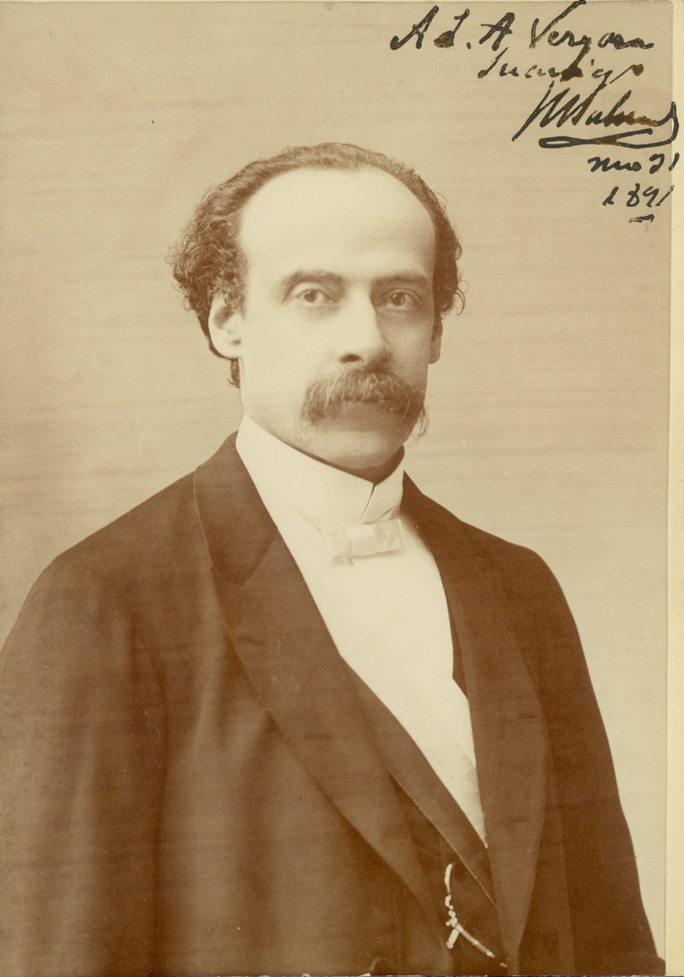
President José Manuel Balmaceda

The chambers were now only waiting for a suitable opportunity to assert their authority. In 1890 it was stated that President Balmaceda had determined to nominate and cause to be elected as his successor in 1891 one of his own personal friends. This question of the election of another President brought matters to a head, and Congress refused to vote any funds to carry on the government. To avoid trouble Balmaceda entered into a compromise with Congress, and agreed to nominate a ministry to their liking on condition that the supplies for 1890 were voted. This cabinet, however, was of short duration, and resigned when the ministers understood the full amount of friction between the President and Congress. Balmaceda then nominated a ministry not in accord with the views of Congress, under Claudio Vicuña, whom it was no secret that Balmaceda intended to be his successor in the presidential chair. To prevent any expression of opinion upon his conduct in the matter, he refrained from summoning an extraordinary session of the legislature for discussion of the estimates of revenue and expenditure for 1891.

Balmaceda implemented a purge of members of the Chile army that he suspected were disloyal to him.

=== Civil war ===
When January 1, 1891 arrived, the president published a decree in the Diario Oficial to the effect that the budget of 1890 would be considered the official budget for 1891. This act was illegal and exceeded the authority of executive power. In response to the action of President Balmaceda, the vice-president of the Senate, Waldo Silva, and the president of the Chamber of Deputies, Ramón Barros Luco, issued a proclamation appointing Captain Jorge Montt as commander of the Navy, and stating that the Navy could not recognize the authority of Balmaceda so long as he did not administer public affairs in accordance with the constitutional law of Chile. The majority of the members of the chambers sided with this movement, and signed an Act of Deposition of President Balmaceda, triggering a constitutional crisis. On 7 January Waldo Silva, Barros Luco, and a number of senators and deputies embarked on the Chilean warship "Blanco Encalada," accompanied by the "Esmeralda" and "O'Higgins" and other vessels, and sailed out of Valparaiso harbor and proceeded northwards to Tarapacá to organize armed resistance against the president, launching the civil war.

Balmaceda had the loyalty of the Army in the Civil War, but the Navy supported Congress against Balmaceda.

This act in defiance of Congress was not the only issue that brought about the revolution. Balmaceda had alienated the aristocratic classes of Chile with his personal vanity and ambition and soon after his election was irreconcilably at odds with the majority of the national representatives. The oligarchy composed of the great landowners had always been an important factor in the political life of the republic; when President Balmaceda found himself outside this circle he endeavored to govern without their support, and to bring into the administration a group of people outside the inner circles of political power, whom he could easily control. Clerical influence also turned against him as a result of his radically secular ideas about government.

On 23 May 1891, London Times correspondent in Chile Maurice Hervey alleged British intervention as having been key to the overthrow of Balmaceda, writing, "Beyond the possibility of contradiction, the instigators, the wire-pullers, the financial supporters of the so called revolution were and are the English or Anglo Chilean owners of the nitrate deposits of the Tarapacá."

== Aftermath ==
After Balmaceda's forces were overwhelmed and destroyed in the Battle of La Placilla, it was clear that he could no longer hope to find a sufficient strength amongst his adherents to maintain himself in power, and in view of the rapid approach of the rebel army, he abandoned his official duties to seek an asylum in the Argentine legation. On August 29, he officially handed power to General Manuel Baquedano, who maintained order in Santiago until the arrival of the congressional leaders on August 30.

The president remained concealed in the Argentine legation until September 19. On the morning of that date, one day after the anniversary of his elevation to the presidency and when the term for which he had been elected president of the republic terminated, he shot and killed himself, rather than surrender to the new government. His reason for this act, put forward in letters written shortly before his end, was that he did not believe the conquerors would give him an impartial trial. The death of Balmaceda finished all cause of contention in Chile, and was the closing act of the most severe and bloodiest struggle that the country had ever witnessed.

== Personal life ==
On 11 October 1865, Balmaceda married Emilia de Toro, granddaughter of Mateo de Toro Zambrano, 1st Count of La Conquista.

Balmaceda and Toro had eight children including Pedro Balmaceda, a poet and writer, and Enrique Balmaceda, a diplomat and politician. Through his daughter María Elisa, Balmaceda was the father-in-law of Emilio Bello Codesido.

Political offices
Preceded by Domingo Santa María	President of Chile; 1886–1891	Succeeded by Manuel Baquedano
Government offices
Preceded by Melquiades Valderrama	Minister of Foreign Affairs and Colonization; 1881–1882	Succeeded by Luis Aldunate
Preceded by José Francisco Vergara	Minister of the Interior; 1882–1885	Succeeded by Ramón Barros Luco
