= Government Junta of Chile (1810) =

Ruling body of post-colonial Chile from 1810 to 1811

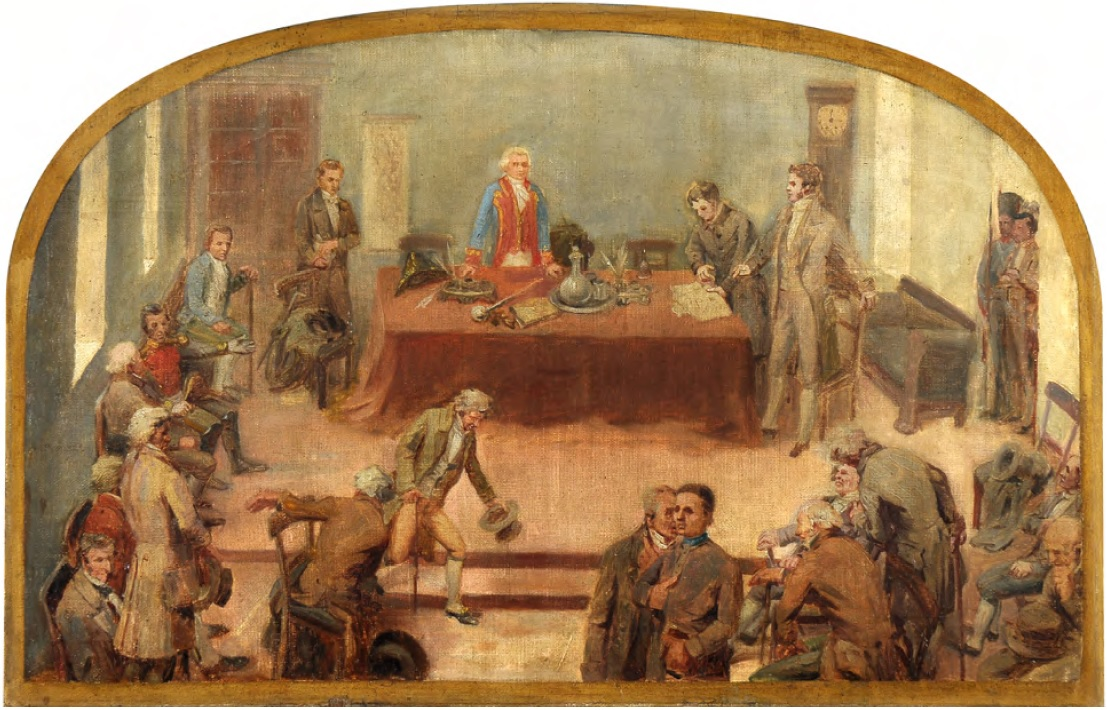
Opening session of the First Junta

The First Government Junta of Chile, officially the Provisional Government Junta of the Kingdom in the name of Ferdinand VII, was the organization established to rule post-colonial Chile following the deposition and imprisonment of King Ferdinand VII of Spain by Napoleon Bonaparte. It was the earliest step in the Chilean struggle for independence, and the anniversary of its establishment is celebrated as the national day of Chile.

== Background ==
At the start of 1808, the Captaincy General of Chile—one of the smallest and poorest colonies in the Spanish Empire—was under the administration of Luis Muñoz de Guzmán, an able, respected and well-liked Royal Governor. In May 1808 the overthrow of Charles IV and Ferdinand VII, their replacement by Joseph Bonaparte and the start of the Peninsular War plunged the empire into a state of agitation. In the meantime, Chile was facing its own internal political problems. Governor Guzmán had suddenly died on February of that year and the crown had not been able to appoint a new governor before the invasion. After a brief interim regency by Juan Rodríguez Ballesteros, and according to the succession law in place at the time, the position was laid claim to and assumed by the most senior military commander, who happened to be Brigadier Francisco García Carrasco.

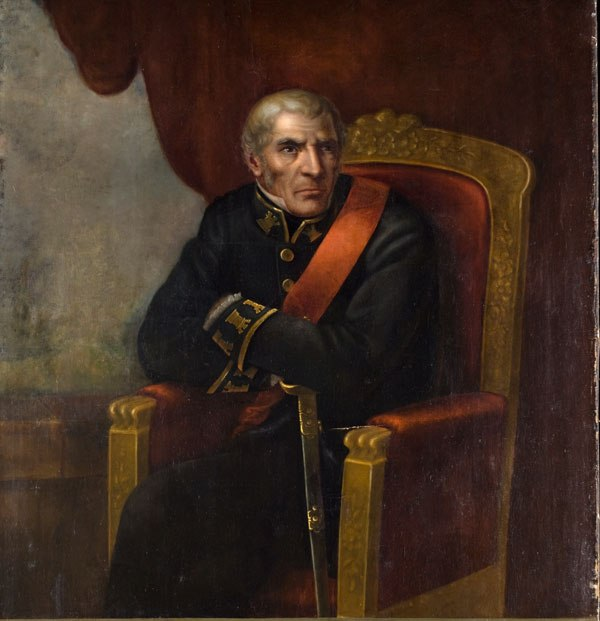
Francisco García Carrasco

García Carrasco took over the post of Governor of Chile in April and in August the news of the Napoleonic invasion of Spain and of the conformation of a Supreme Central Junta to govern the Empire in the absence of a legitimate king reached the country. In the meantime, Charlotte Joaquina, sister of Ferdinand and wife of the King of Portugal, who was living in Brazil, also made attempts to obtain the administration of the Spanish dominions in Latin America. Since her father and brother were being held prisoners in France, she regarded herself as the heiress of her captured family. Allegedly among her plans was to send armies to occupy Buenos Aires and northern Argentina and to style herself as Queen of La Plata.

Brigadier García Carrasco was a man of crude and authoritarian manners, who managed in a very short time to alienate the criollo elites under his command. Already in Chile, as in most of Latin America, there had been some independence agitation but very minimal and concentrated in the very ineffectual Conspiracy of the Tres Antonios back in 1781. The majority of the people were fervent royalists but were divided into two groups: those who favored the status quo and the divine right of Ferdinand VII (known as absolutists) and those who wanted to proclaim Charlotte Joaquina as Queen (known as carlotistas). A third group was composed of those who proposed the replacement of the Spanish authorities with a local junta of notable citizens, which would conform a provisional government to rule in the absence of the king and an independent Spain (known as juntistas).

In 1809 Governor García Carrasco himself was implicated in a flagrant case of corruption (the Scorpion scandal) that managed to destroy whatever remnants of moral authority he or his office had left. From that moment on the pressure for his removal began to build. In June 1810 news arrived from Buenos Aires that Napoleon Bonaparte's forces had conquered Andalusia and laid siege to Cádiz, the last redoubt against the French on Spanish soil. Moreover, the Supreme Central Junta, which had governed the Empire for the past two years, had abolished itself in favor of a Regency Council. García Carrasco, who was a supporter of the Carlotist group, managed to magnify the political problems by taking arbitrary and harsh measures, such as the arrest and deportation to Lima without due process of well-known and socially prominent citizens under simple suspicions of having been sympathetic to the junta idea. Among those arrested were José Antonio de Rojas, Juan Antonio Ovalle and Bernardo de Vera y Pintado.

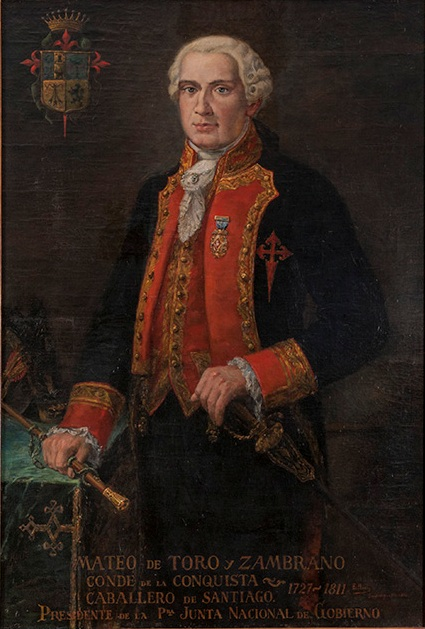
Mateo de Toro Zambrano

The autonomy movement also had, inspired by the May Revolution in Argentina, thoroughly propagated through the criollo elite. They resented the illegal arrests and, together with the news that Cádiz was all that was left of a free Spain, finally solidified in their opposition to the Governor. Brigadier García Carrasco was suspended from office and forced to resign on July 16, 1810, to be in turn replaced by the next most senior soldier, Mateo de Toro Zambrano Count of la Conquista, even though a legitimate Governor, Francisco Javier de Elío, had already been appointed by the Viceroy of Peru.

Count Toro Zambrano was, by all standards, a very unorthodox selection. He was a very old man already (82 years old at the time) and moreover a "criollo" (someone born in the colonies) as opposed to a "peninsular" (someone born in Spain). Immediately after his appointment in July, the juntistas began to lobby him in order to obtain the formation of a junta. In August the Royal Appeals Court (Spanish: Real Audiencia) took a public loyalty oath to the Regency Council in front of a massive audience, which put added pressure on the Governor to define himself. After vacillating for some time over which party to follow, Toro Zambrano finally agreed to hold an open Cabildo (city hall) meeting in Santiago to discuss the issue. The date was set for September 18, 1810 at 11 AM.

== Members ==
Position	Name
President	Mateo de Toro Zambrano
Vice President	José Martínez de Aldunate
Members	Fernando Márquez de la Plata; Juan Martínez de Rozas; Ignacio de la Carrera Cuevas; Colonel Francisco Javier de Reyna; Juan Enrique Rosales
Secretaries	José Gaspar Marín; José Gregorio Argomedo

== Establishment ==
From the very beginning the juntistas took the political initiative. They were able to place their members in charge of sending the invitations, thus manipulating the assistance lists to their own advantage. At the September 18th session, they grabbed center stage with shouts of "¡Junta queremos! ¡junta queremos!" ("We want a junta! We want a junta"). Count Toro Zambrano, faced with this very public show of force, acceded to their demands by depositing his ceremonial baton on top of the main table and saying "Here is the baton, take it and rule". The discussion ended with the establishment of the Government Junta of the Kingdom of Chile, also known as the First Junta, which was organized with the same powers held by a Royal Governor. In the discussion triumphed the idea of a local independent government as opposed to the monarchist idea of submitting themselves to the control of the Regency Council. Nonetheless, this idea of "independence" must not be taken in the modern sense. This junta never intended to sever the relationship with the monarchy, but was only taking advantage of the possibility to assert local rule.

=== Administrative measures ===
Their first measure was to take a formal loyalty oath to Ferdinand VII as legitimate King. Count Toro Zambrano was elected President, and the rest of the positions were distributed equally among all parties, but the real power was left in the hands of the secretary, Juan Martínez de Rozas. The junta then proceeded to take some concrete measures that had been long-held aspirations of the colonials: it created a militia for the defense of the kingdom, decreed freedom of trade with all nations that were allied to Spain or neutrals, a unique tariff of 134% for all imports (with the exceptions of printing presses, books and guns which were liberated from all taxes) and in order to increase its representation, and ordered the convocation of a National Congress.

Immediately, political intrigue began amongst the ruling elite, with news of the political turbulence and wars of Europe all the while coming in. It was eventually decided that elections for the National Congress, to be composed of 42 representatives, would be held in 1811. By March of that year 36 representatives had already been elected in all major cities with the exception of Santiago and Valparaíso.

=== Political tendencies ===
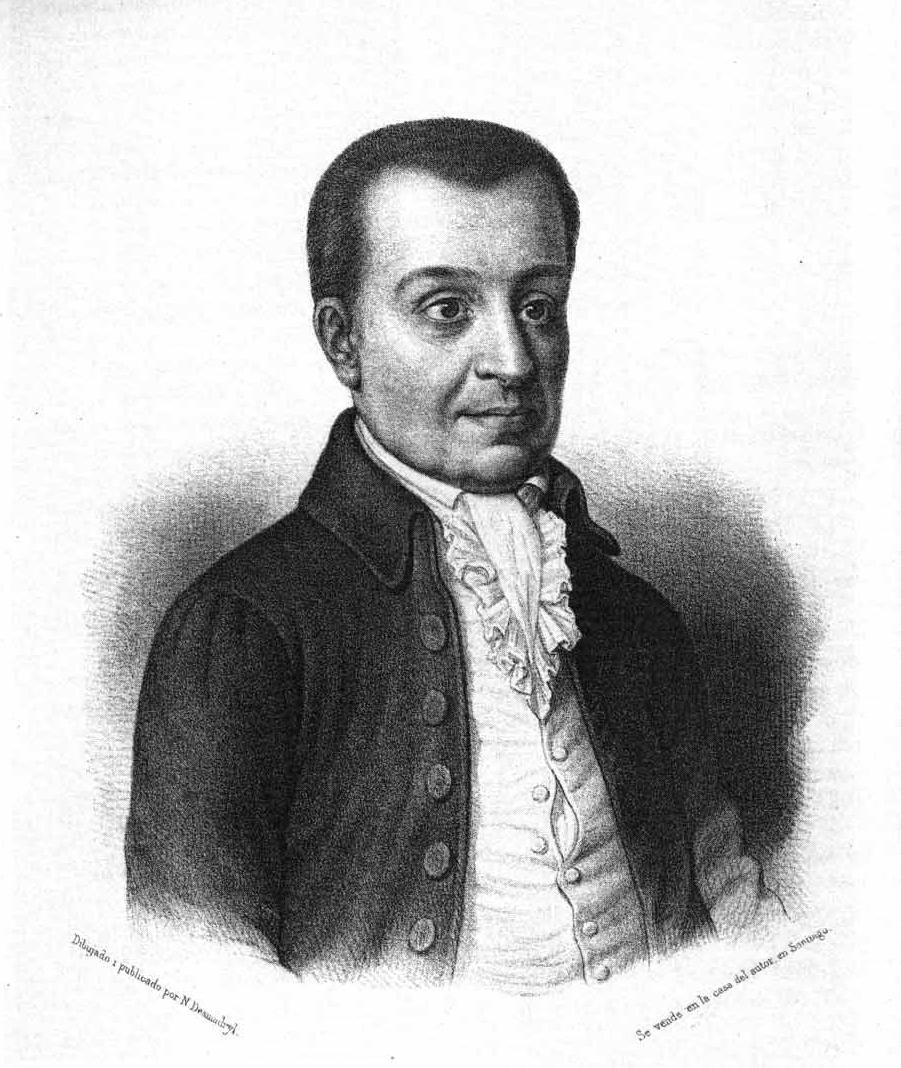
Juan Martínez de Rozas

After the natural death of the president, Mateo de Toro Zambrano on February 26, 1811, he was replaced by Juan Martínez de Rozas, due to the illness of the Vice President, Bishop José Martínez de Aldunate, (who was to die on April 8, 1811).

Three political tendencies were starting to appear: the extremists, the moderates and the royalists. These groups were all decidedly against independence from Spain and differentiated themselves only in the degree of political autonomy that they sought. The moderates (Spanish: moderados), under the leadership of José Miguel Infante, were a majority, and wanted a very slow pace of reforms since they were afraid that once the King was back in power he would think that they were seeking independence and would roll-back all changes. The exalted (Spanish: exaltados) were the second most important group and they advocated a larger degree of freedom from the Crown and a faster pace of reforms stopping just short of full independence. His leader was Juan Martínez de Rozas. The royalists were against any reform at all and for the maintenance of the status quo.

=== Figueroa Mutiny ===
The great political surprise up to that point had been the results from the other center of power, Concepción, in which royalists had defeated the supporters of Juan Martínez de Rozas. In the rest of Chile, the results were more or less equally divided: twelve pro-Rozas delegates, fourteen anti-Rozas and three royalists. So, the Santiago elections were the key to Rozas' desire to remain in power. This election was supposed to take place on April 10, but before they could be called the Figueroa mutiny broke out.

On April 1, the royalist colonel Tomás de Figueroa—considering the notion of elections to be too populist—led a revolt in Santiago. The revolt sputtered, and Figueroa was arrested and summarily executed. The mutiny was successful in that temporarily sabotaged the elections, which had to be delayed. Eventually, however, a National Congress was duly elected, and all 6 deputies from Santiago came from the moderate camp. Nonetheless, the mutiny also encouraged a radicalization of political postures: even though moderates advocating only greater autonomy of the elites from Spanish Imperial control—without a complete rupture—gained the majority of seats, a vocal minority was formed by excited revolutionaries who now wanted complete and instant independence from Spain.

As a consequence of the mutiny, Martinez de Rozas was replaced on April 2, 1811, by Fernando Márquez de la Plata. The Royal Appeals Court, a long-standing pillar of support of the Spanish Crown, was dissolved for its alleged "complicity" and the idea of full independence gained momentum for the first time. The Junta lasted until July 4, 1811, when it was replaced by the National Congress, and later by the Second Junta.

== See also ==
- Chilean War of Independence
- Figueroa mutiny
- History of Chile
- List of government juntas of Chile
- List of heads of state of Chile
- Junta (Peninsular War)
- First Chilean National Congress
