= José Antonio Martínez de Aldunate =

Chilean Bishop

Bishop José Martínez de Aldunate

Bishop José Antonio Martínez de Aldunate y Garcés de Marcilla (December 21, 1731 – April 8, 1811) was a Chilean Bishop and member of the First Government Junta of Chile.

He was born in Santiago, the son of José Martínez de Aldunate Barahona and Rosa Josefa Garcés de Marcilla y Molina. He carried out his first studies in the "Convictorio de San Francisco Javier", and graduated from the Real Universidad de San Felipe, where he obtained doctorates in both types of law (Civil and Canonic). At an unspecified later date, he was ordained as a priest in Santiago, where he later became Provisor and General Vicar. In 1758, he was named Cathedral Dean. He also became the Rector of the University.

In 1804, Pope Pius VII named him Bishop of Huamanga, Peru, to replace Bishop Francisco de Matienzo y Rivero. He was consecrated by Francisco José Marán, Bishop of Santiago, before travelling to Perú. Five years later, the Regency council promoted him to Bishop of Santiago, being replaced in Huamanga by Bishop José Vicente Silva.

The year 1810 was very complicated politically for the Spanish empire in general, and for Chile in particular. Two years before, the King Ferdinand VII had been imprisoned in France. In Chile, the Royal Governor Francisco Antonio García Carrasco had been forced to resign due to his ineptitude and corruption, and had been replaced by Mateo de Toro y Zambrano.

After Mateo de Toro y Zambrano took over as Royal Governor, he was convinced to call an open meeting of the leading citizens of the city to decide the political future of the colony. He convened such a meeting for the morning of September 18, 1810. The discussion ended with the conformation of the First Government Junta of Chile, of which Bishop Martínez de Aldunate was voted the Vice President. His death in Santiago, less than a year later (he was already 79 years old) precluded him from taking a larger role in the independence of Chile.

== See also ==
- History of Chile
