= Ernesto Balmaceda Bello =

Chilean diplomat

Ernesto Balmaceda
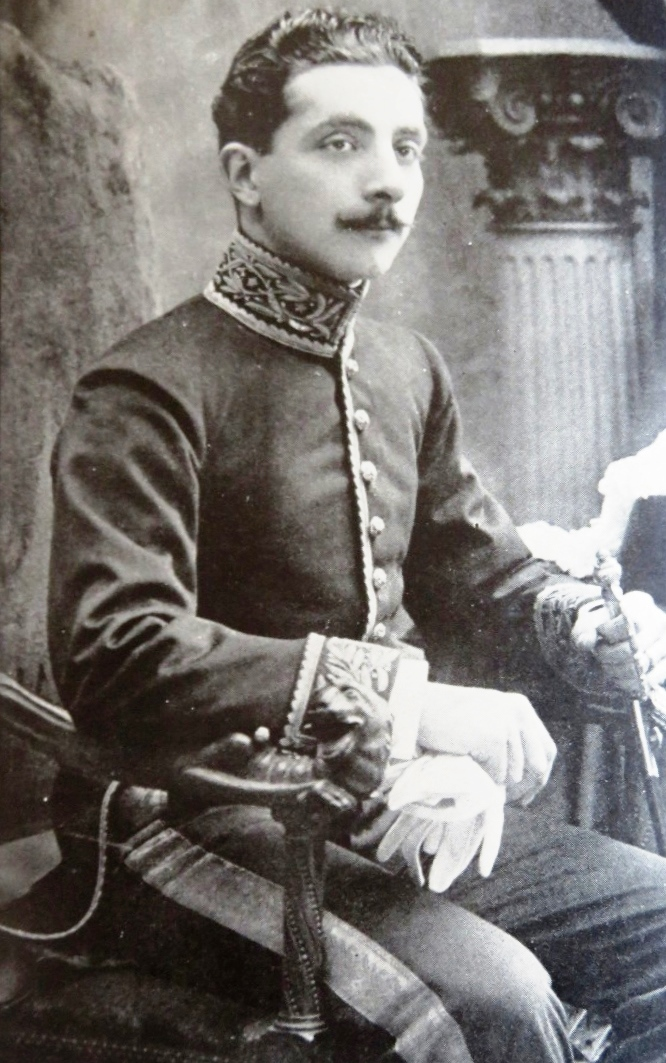
- Born: February 27, 1887; Santiago, Chile
- Died: February 24, 1906 (aged 18); Brussels, Belgium
- Cause of death: Homicide
- Occupation: Diplomat
- Parents: José Rafael del Carmen Balmaceda Fernández (father); Ana María Bello Codesido (mother)
- Relatives: José Manuel Balmaceda (uncle); Emilio Bello Codesido (uncle); Andrés Bello (great-grandfather)
- Family: Balmaceda family; Bello family

Ernesto Balmaceda Bello (February 27, 1887 – February 24, 1906) was a Chilean diplomat, who was murdered in Belgium in a celebrated case that came to define diplomatic privileges and immunities for the retinue and families of diplomatic staff. He was of Basque descent.

== Early life ==
Ernesto Balmaceda Bello was born on February 27, 1887 in Santiago, to José Rafael del Carmen Balmaceda Fernández, a politician and diplomat, and Ana María Bello Codesido, granddaughter of Andrés Bello. Through his father, Balmaceda was the nephew of President José Manuel Balmaceda, and the grandson of landowner and politician Manuel José de Balmaceda Ballesteros. Balmaceda was the paternal and maternal nephew of Emilio Bello Codesido, president of the 1925 Government Junta.

Following the completion of his secondary studies, Balmaceda joined the Chilean Foreign Service. In 1905, Balmaceda was appointed secretary to the Don Luis Waddington Urrutia (1859–1927), the charge d'affaires of the Chilean diplomatic delegation in Brussels.

== Death ==
His immediate superior at the consulate in Brussels was charge d'affaires Don Luis Waddington, who had two children: Adelaida and Carlos. Soon after his arrival, Balmaceda started to court Adelaide and shortly thereafter, the parents of the bride-to-be found out that the young couple already had had sexual intercourse. They then demanded that 18-year-old Ernesto become engaged to Adelaide and "redress the wrong done" to her. He admitted his error and accepted the engagement for the time being.

Balmaceda did not want to get married, so he wrote to his family to have himself immediately transferred to another embassy. His family connections managed his transfer to the embassy in the United States, but before he could depart the news leaked, and 16-year-old Carlos Waddington, brother of his bride-to-be started to practice target-shooting in the embassy gardens under his window. Ernesto Balmaceda panicked and on February 24, 1906, the day when the engagement was to be publicly announced at an embassy banquet, he hid in his rooming-house, with his friend Javier Rengifo. Carlos visited him and demanded that he honor his word. When Balmaceda refused, he shot him three times: once in the heart, once in the chest and once in the head.

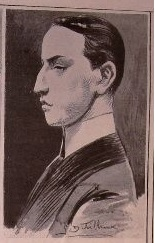
Carlos Waddington during his trial in 1907

After the murder, Carlos Waddington fled to the Chilean embassy and claimed diplomatic immunity and extraterritoriality. The Belgian people were incensed at this behavior and surrounded the embassy, bent on capturing Waddington. The police had to establish a constant cordon in order to prevent the mob from violating the building and lynching him. On March 2, Chile waived its rights and ordered Waddington to be handed over to the Belgian police to stand trial.

By the time the trial happened, public opinion had shifted in Waddington's favor, and he was viewed as the avenger of his sister's honor. After a very short trial, he was acquitted on July 6, 1907.

== Additional information ==
=== See also ===
- Balmaceda family
