= Fernando Márquez de la Plata =

Chilean politician (1740–1818)

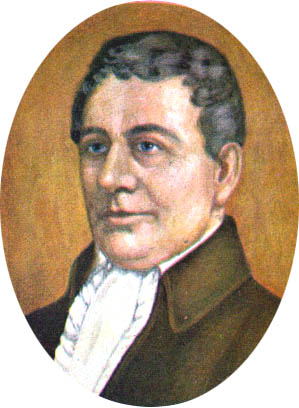

President of Government Junta of Chile
- In office 2 April 1811 – 4 July 1811
- Preceded by: Juan Martínez de Rozas

Governor of Huancavelica, Peru
- In office 1784–1789

Personal details
- Born: Fernando Márquez de la Plata y Orozco; August 30, 1740 Seville, Kingdom of Spain
- Died: 17 December 1818 (aged 78) Santiago, Chile

Fernando Márquez de la Plata y Orozco (30 August 1740 – 17 December 1818) was a Spanish colonial functionary, and a member of the First Government Junta of Chile.

He was born in Seville on August 30, 1740, to a very aristocratic family. The son of Rodrigo Márquez de la Plata y García de Celis and of Luisa de Orozco y Martel. His father was a judge, and latter a member of the Council of Indies. He began his studies at the Colegio de Santo Tomás and then obtained his degree in Canon Law at the University of Seville, graduating as a lawyer. He began his career as a member of the Council of the Indies.

In 1776, he was sent to America. He lived first in the city of La Paz, Bolivia, becoming an Appeals Judge (Oidor) between 1781 and 1783. In that year he was promoted to Governor of Huancavelica, Peru, a position he held between 1784 and 1789. He was then named Appeals Judge to the city of Lima. In 1786, he married the Chilean María Antonia Calvo de Encalada y Recabarren. The ceremony was held by proxy, since the groom could not leave his position in Lima. In 1798, he was named President of the Appeals Court (Real Audiencia) of Quito. By then, he was famous for his knowledge, equanimity and good sense. In 1803, he travelled to Chile to assume the position of Regent of the Appeals Court of Santiago.

After Mateo de Toro y Zambrano took over as Royal Governor in 1810, he was convinced to call an open meeting of the leading citizens of the city to decide the political future of the colony. He convened such a meeting for the morning of September 18, 1810. The discussion ended with the conformation of the First Government Junta of Chile where Márquez de la Plata was elected as one of the members. After the death of Toro y Zambrano, the illness (and posterior death) of the Vice President, Bishop José Martínez de Aldunate, and the disgrace of their appointed successor Juan Martinez de Rozas as a consequence of the Figueroa mutiny, which Márquez de la Plata had to put down, he was elected president, a position he held between April 2 and July 4, 1811. In September 1811 he was named a member of the New Appeals Court (Tribunal de Apelaciones), the body that replaced the colonial Appeals Court (Real Audiencia) and became its doyen.

In 1814, after the Battle of Rancagua, he was forced to exile himself to Mendoza. As a difference with most émigrés he travelled with almost all his fortune. According to the contemporary sources, he carried 5,000 pesos in silver coin, 14 tuns of crafted silver and 7 chests with clothes and jewelry. He finally returned to Chile in 1818, after independence, and was named Regent of the Justice Courts, a position he held until his death later in the same year, at the age of 78.

== See also ==
- History of Chile
- Chilean Independence
- Figueroa mutiny

Political offices
| Preceded by Juan Martínez de Rozas | President of Government Junta; 1811 | Succeeded by Junta dissolved |
