= Intendancy of Huancavelica =

Intendancy of the Spanish Empire

Intendencia de Guancavelica
- Intendancy of the Spanish Empire
- 1784–1822
- Coat of arms

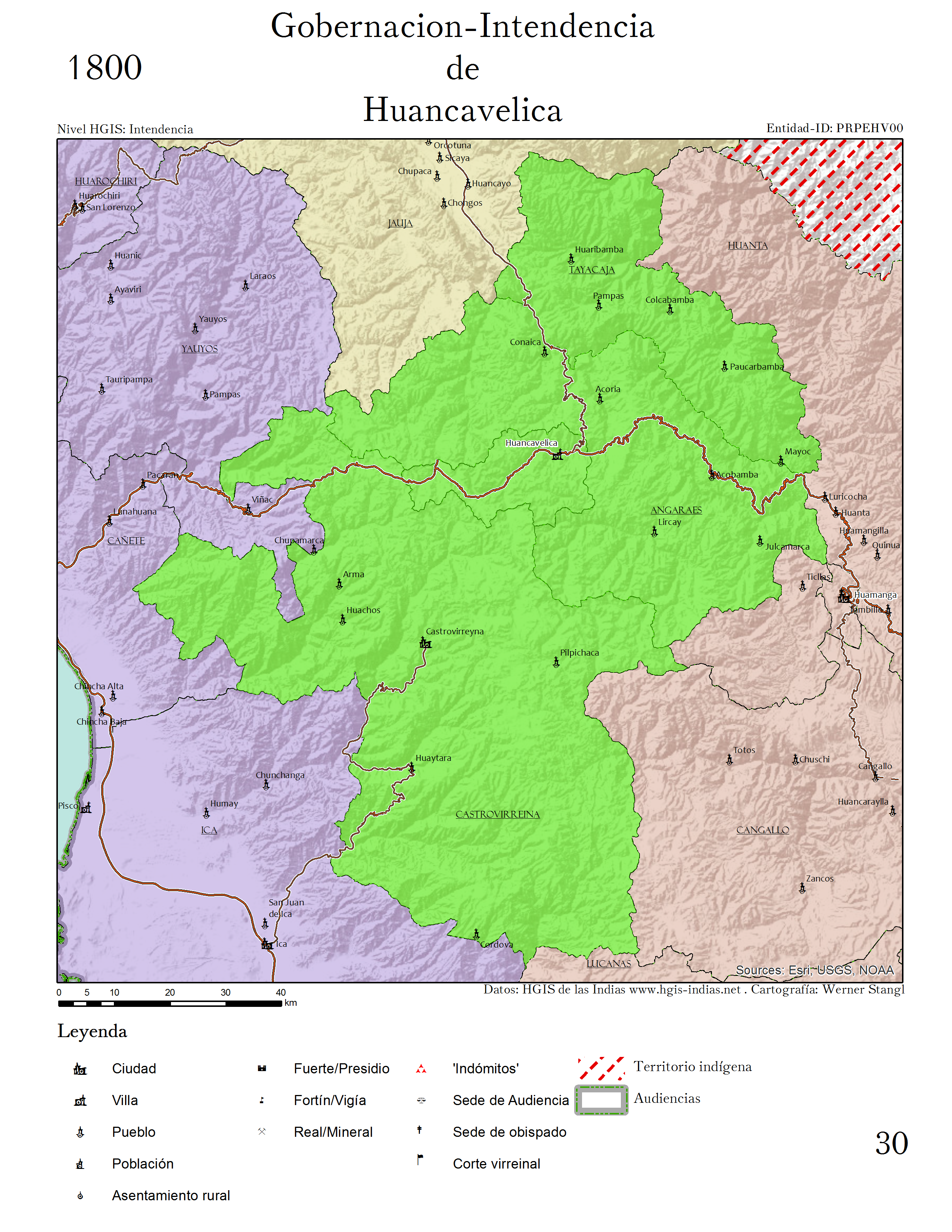
- The intendancy within Peru in 1810
- Capital: Villa Rica de Oropesa
- Government
- Intendant
  - 1784–1789: F. Márquez de la Plata (first)
  - 1822: Gabriel Perez (last)
- Historical era: Viceroyalty of Peru
  - Established: 1784
  - Replaced: 26 April 1822
- Subdivisions
  - Type: Partidos
  - Units: See relevant section
Succeeded by
Department of Huancavelica

The Intendancy of Huancavelica (Spanish: Intendencia de Huancavelica), also known informally as Huancavelica Province (Spanish: Provincia de Huancavelica (Guancavelica)), was one of the territorial divisions of the Viceroyalty of Peru. The territory was ruled from Huancavelica. It existed from 1784 to 1822.

== History ==
On December 22, 1574, when Viceroy Francisco de Toledo reorganized the Indian corregimientos created by Governor Lope García de Castro in 1565, he ordered that the Angaraes and Castrovirreyna corregimientos depended on the Spanish Corregimiento in Huamanga, both in the district of the Real Audiencia of Lima. In 1581 the Corregimiento of Huancavelica was separated from that of Huamanga, lasting until 1585, to be separated again in 1601 as the Government of Huancavelica (Spanish: Gobierno de Huancavelica), whose governor was appointed by the king until 1604, the year in which he was appointed by the viceroy switching with that of Ica, the royal appointment of that of Castrovirreyna persisting since November 20, 1623. In 1612 the Corregimiento of Angaraes and Chocorbos was distributed between Castrovirreyna and Huancavelica, Angaraes subsisting as a subdivision of Huancavelica. Since the creation of the Bishopric of Huamanga in 1617, the two townships remained in its jurisdiction, forming part of the party headed by the township of that city. A royal decree of December 25, 1696, ordered that the governor of Huancavelica be appointed again by the king, with the appointment subsidiarily falling on an oidor of the Audiencia of Lima or the Court of Accounts of that city, which remained until 1735, since then the king appointed him a private governor.

The corregimientos were suppressed in 1784 by King Charles III and replaced by the intendancies. The territory of the Bishopric of Huamanga was divided between the municipalities of Huamanga and Huancavelica. The corregimientos of Angaraes and Castrovirreyna and the Government of Huancavelica became parties of the second, creating the party of Tayacaja.

The system of intendants was established in the Viceroyalty of Peru by royal order of August 5, 1783, and the Royal Ordinance of Intendants of January 28, 1782 was applied. The first intendant of Huancavelica was the judge of the Audiencia of Lima Fernando Márquez de la Plata, who took office in 1784, appointed by the viceroy at the proposal of the visitor general Jorge Escobedo y Alarcón and approved by the king on January 24, 1785.

It existed until April 26, 1822, when General José de San Martín created the Department of Huancavelica within the Protectorate of Peru.

== Population and ethnic composition ==
Ethnic composition of the Intendancy of Huancavelica - (Figures from Haenke based on the census of the Viceroyalty of Peru circa c. 1790)
1. Indigenous or Amerindians 23,899 (77.5%)
2. Mestizo 4,537 (14.7%)
3. Spaniards and Creoles 2,341 (7.60%)
4. Free pardos (not mentioned) 0 (0.00%)
5. Enslaved Africans 41 (0.13%)

The German naturalist Thaddeus Haenke, who took part in the Malaspina Expedition (1789–1794), a scientific expedition organized by the Spanish Crown to its overseas territories, included in his work Descripción del Perú por Tadeo Haenke (Description of Peru by Tadeo Haenke) an account of the ethnic and demographic figures (using the terminology of the period) from the census carried out at the end of the 18th century in the Viceroyalty of Peru for each intendancy and its partidos.

He indicated that the Intendancy of Huancavelica comprised 1 city, 1 town, 22 doctrinas, and 86 annexed villages, inhabited by 30,917 persons or almas ("souls"), consisting of 81 clergymen and 18 male religious; and ethnically by 2,341 white Spaniards (Peninsulares and Creoles), 23,899 Indians (Native Americans), 4,537 mestizos, and 41 enslaved Africans, distributed across the 4 partidos that composed it.

However, the sum by group gives a total of 30,818 persons, which is due to the fact that the clergymen were not considered within the ethnic breakdown but segregated separately. Nevertheless, it provides a close approximation of the society of that time, showing that more than three-quarters of the population was indigenous or Amerindian (77.55%), followed by a minority of mestizos who made up around one-eighth (14.72%), a smaller minority of Spaniards (7.59%), both peninsular and Creole, and finally an insignificant minority of Afro-descendants that amounted to less than one percent (0.13%), composed exclusively of enslaved Africans. Free pardos are not mentioned, or they may have been included together with the mestizos.

== Subdivisions ==
The intendancy was divided into four partidos.

Partido	Head (city of government)
Huancavelica	Villa Rica de Oropesa
Castrovirreyna	Castrovirreyna
Angaraes	Acobamba
Tayacaja	Pampas

== Intendants ==
The Governors (intendants) who ruled the intendancy were:

- Fernando Márquez de la Plata, oidor of Lima (1784–1789)
- Pedro de Tagle Bracho, oidor of Santa fe from the Order of Calatrava (1789–1791)
- The Count of Ruiz de Castilla (1791–1794)
- Juan Maria Galvez, Colonel of the Order of Charles III (1794–1805)
- Martin Bonco, Navy Captain (1805; did not take office)
- Juan Vives y Echeverría, Lieutenant colonel of the Order of Calatrava (1806–1809)
- Francisco Javier de Mendizabal, Sergeant major (1809–1810; interim)
- Lázaro de Ribera y Espinoza (1810–1813)
- Juan Vives y Echeverría (1813–1815)
- Garcia Eulate, Lieutenant colonel (1815–1818)
- José Montenegro y Ubalde, Colonel (1818–1821)
- Agustín Otermín, Colonel (1821–1822)
- Gabriel Perez, Colonel (1822–1824)

== See also ==
- Department of Huancavelica
