= Manuel María de Toro, 3rd Count of La Conquista =

Spanish nobleman (1798–1818)

The Most Illustrious Manuel María de Toro-Zambrano
- 3rd Count of La Conquista
- Born: Manuel María de Toro-Zambrano y Dumont de Holdre; 1798; Madrid, Spain
- Died: 5 April 1818 (aged 19–20); Maipú, Santiago de Chile
- Noble family: Toro
- Father: Gregorio José de Toro
- Mother: Josefa Dumont y Michel

Manuel María de Toro-Zambrano y Dumont de Holdre, 3rd Count of la Conquista (Spanish: Manuel María de Toro y Dumont de Holdre, tercer Conde de la Conquista) (1798 - April 5, 1818) was a Spanish nobleman who fought with the Royalist troops during the Chilean War of Independence.

== Life ==
He was born in Madrid, the eldest son of Gregorio José de Toro and of his wife Josefa Dumont de Holdre y Miquel. He became Count at the death of his father in 1816, at the young age of 18. He fought with the Spanish Army against independence, and went into exile in Perú with the remains of the Royalist army after the defeat at the Battle of Chacabuco in 1817, while the pro-independence government confiscated all his properties.

He returned the next year with the army of Brigadier Mariano Osorio, to whom he had become personal adjutant. He was killed a few months later during the Battle of Maipu, and was in turn succeeded to the title by his sister, María Nicolasa.

== Additional information ==
=== See also ===
- Chilean Independence

=== Sources ===
- Pilleux Cepeda, Mauricio. "Recopilación de Genealogia Chilena" (in Spanish).

Spanish nobility
Preceded by Gregorio José de Toro	Count of la Conquista; 1816-1818	Succeeded by María Nicolasa de Toro
