= Juan Rodríguez Ballesteros =

Spanish judge (1738–1818)

Juan Rodríguez Ballesteros (Alcalá de Guadaíra, Seville, Spain, 1738 - Lima, Peru, 17 February 1818) was a Spanish judge and colonial official in South America. For a few weeks in 1808 he reigned as interim Governor of Chile.

== Biography ==
He probably emigrated to the New World after 1775, as his son José was still born in Madrid that year.
His father was a royal prosecutor at the Supreme Court in Santiago de Chile (the Real Audiencia of Santiago), and Juan followed in his father's footsteps. In 1795, he became Oidor (Judge) of the Supreme Court of Lima (Real Audiencia of Lima), remaining there until the year 1806. In September 1806, he returned to Santiago de Chile to become Regent of the Real Audiencia of Santiago.

When the Governor of Chile, Luis Muñoz de Guzmán, died in February 1808, the office passed to the highest-ranking Spanish officer: Francisco Antonio García Carrasco, who was, however, at the time in the south of the country inspecting fortifications. Until the news of Muñoz's death reached García and he had fulfilled his duties and could come to Santiago, Juan Rodríguez Ballesteros took over the official duties as Governor of Chile, on an interim basis. He handed over power to García Carrasco on 22 April 1808.

Juan Rodríguez Ballesteros remained a supporter of the Royalist cause in Chile, even after the overthrow of his successor. He strongly opposed the establishment of the First Junta, which earned him an exile to the town of San Fernando, decreed by the insurgents on 14 April 1811. On the same day, the Real Audiencia of Santiago was abolished.

After many efforts, he obtained permission from the National Congress to travel to Lima, where he died in 1818 at the age of 80.

His son José Rodríguez Ballesteros (1775-1851) was a Colonel who served in the Royalist Army during the Chilean War of Independence.

== Sources ==
- Real Academia de la Historia

Government offices
Preceded by Luis Muñoz de Guzmán	Royal Governor of Chile (acting); February 1808–April 1808	Succeeded by Francisco García Carrasco
