= Enrique Balmaceda =

Chilean politician and diplomat

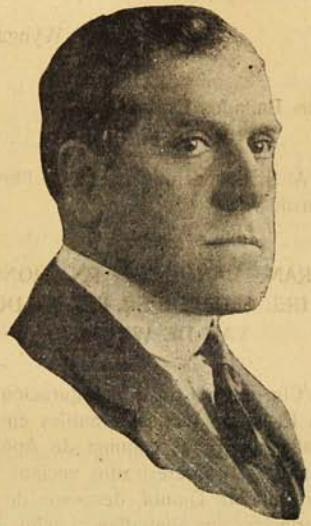

Ambassador of Chile to England
- In office 15 March 1953 – 14 November 1958
- President: Carlos Ibáñez del Campo
- Preceded by: Manuel Bianchi Gundián
- Succeeded by: Víctor Santa Cruz

Mayor of Santiago
- In office 1927–1928
- President: Carlos Ibáñez del Campo
- Preceded by: Manuel Salas Rodríguez
- Succeeded by: Eliecer Parada

Minister of Social Welfare
- In office 26 March 1928 – 20 April 1928
- President: Carlos Ibáñez del Campo
- Preceded by: Conrado Ríos
- Succeeded by: Alejandro Lazo Guevara
- In office 17 November 1927 – 23 March 1928
- President: Carlos Ibáñez del Campo
- Preceded by: Office created
- Succeeded by: Conrado Ríos

Minister of Justice and Public Instruction
- In office 21 July 1927 – 24 February 1928
- President: Carlos Ibáñez del Campo
- Preceded by: José Santos Salas
- Succeeded by: Osvaldo Koch

Minister of the Interior
- In office 23 May 1927 – 22 February 1928
- President: Carlos Ibáñez del Campo
- Preceded by: Carlos Frödden
- Succeeded by: Guillermo Edwards Matte

Minister of Public Works, Trade, and Communication Ways
- In office 6 September 1927 – 29 September 1927
- President: Carlos Ibáñez del Campo
- Preceded by: Juan Emilio Ortiz
- Succeeded by: Office dissolved

Minister of War and Navy
- In office 13 May 1921 – 17 August 1921
- President: Arturo Alessandri
- Preceded by: Carlos Silva Cruz
- Succeeded by: Remigio Medina

Member of the Chamber of Deputies
- In office 1 May 1918 – 31 July 1921
- Constituency: Castro
- In office 1 March 1906 – 1 March 1909
- Constituency: Itata

Personal details
- Born: 3 March 1878 Santiago, Chile
- Died: 4 January 1962 (aged 83) Santiago, Chile
- Parent(s): José Manuel Balmaceda; Emilia de Toro

Enrique Víctor Aquiles Balmaceda Toro (3 March 1878 – 4 January 1962) was a Chilean politician, diplomat and son of President José Manuel Balmaceda. He was of Basque descent and a member of the Balmaceda family.

Balmaceda was born in Santiago in 1878, the seventh of eight children born to José Manuel Balmaceda Fernández and Emilia de Toro. He was baptised Enrique Víctor Aquiles. His mother was the granddaughter of Mateo de Toro Zambrano, 1st Count of La Conquista. Five of his siblings lived to adulthood. His father committed suicide in 1891, when Enrique was 13 years old.

Balmaceda started his political career by joining the Liberal Democratic Party and was promptly elected deputy for "Itata" (1906–1909) in a 1907 by-election to replace deputy Alberto Sanfuentes who had died, but lost his bid for reelection. In the congressional elections of 1918, he was elected deputy for "Castro" (1918–1921) and was reelected for the same region (1921–1924). On 12 May 1921, President Arturo Alessandri appointed him Minister of War and Navy, position he held until 16 August 1921.

During the first administration of President Carlos Ibáñez he was appointed Minister of the Interior from 23 May 1927 to 24 February 1928; he concurrently served as interim minister of Public Works and of Justice. During the second administration of President Ibáñez, he was appointed ambassador to the United Kingdom.

Balmaceda died in Santiago, in 1962, two months shy of his 84th birthday.
