= Emilia de Toro =

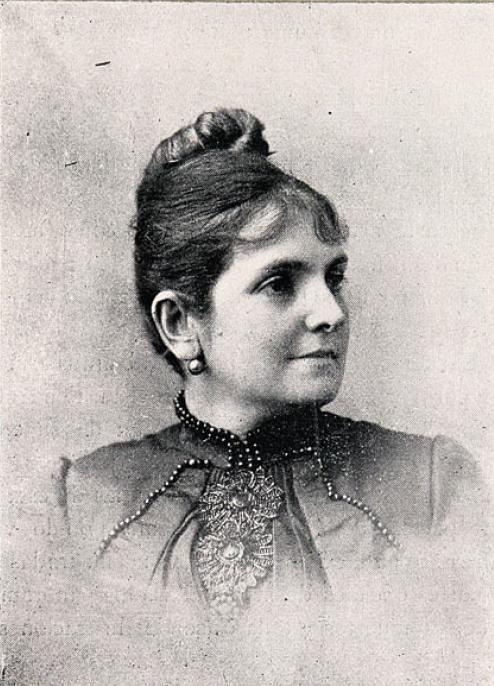

First Lady of Chile
- In role 1886–1891
- President: José Manuel Balmaceda
- Preceded by: Emilia Márquez de la Plata
- Succeeded by: Leonor Frederick

Personal details
- Born: 14 November 1845 Concepción, Chile
- Died: 7 June 1913 (aged 67) New York City, New York, US
- Resting place: Santiago General Cemetery
- Spouse: José Manuel Balmaceda (m. 1845; died 1891)
- Relations: Emilio Bello Codesido (son-in-law); Count Mateo de Toro Zambrano (great-grandfather)
- Children: 8, including Pedro Balmaceda; Enrique Balmaceda

Emilia de Toro Herrera (14 November 1845 – 7 June 1913) was the Chilean First Lady during 1886 to 1891.

== Early life and family ==
De Toro was born on 14 November 1845 in Concepción to Domingo de Toro y Guzmán and Emilia Herrera Martínez de la Torre. De Toro was the great-granddaughter of Count Mateo de Toro Zambrano. De Toro was the younger sister of Domingo de Toro Herrera.

On 11 October 1865, De Toro married José Manuel Balmaceda. De Toro and Balmaceda had eight children including Pedro Balmaceda, a poet and writer, and Enrique Balmaceda, a diplomat and politician. Through her daughter María Elisa, De Toro was the mother-in-law of Emilio Bello Codesido.

== Exile ==
Following the government forces' defeat at the Battle of Placilla, De Toro and her children took refuge in the American embassy whilst Balmaceda took refuge in the Argentine embassy. Following her husband's suicide on 19 September 1891, De Toro and her children went into exile in New York City. On 7 June 1913 De Toro died in New York City, aged 67. De Toro was buried in Santiago General Cemetery.

Honorary titles
Preceded by Emilia Márquez de la Plata	First Lady of Chile; 1886–1891	Succeeded by Leonor Frederick
