= National Museum of Art, La Paz =

National Museum of Art in La Paz, Bolivia

National Museum of Art, Bolivia
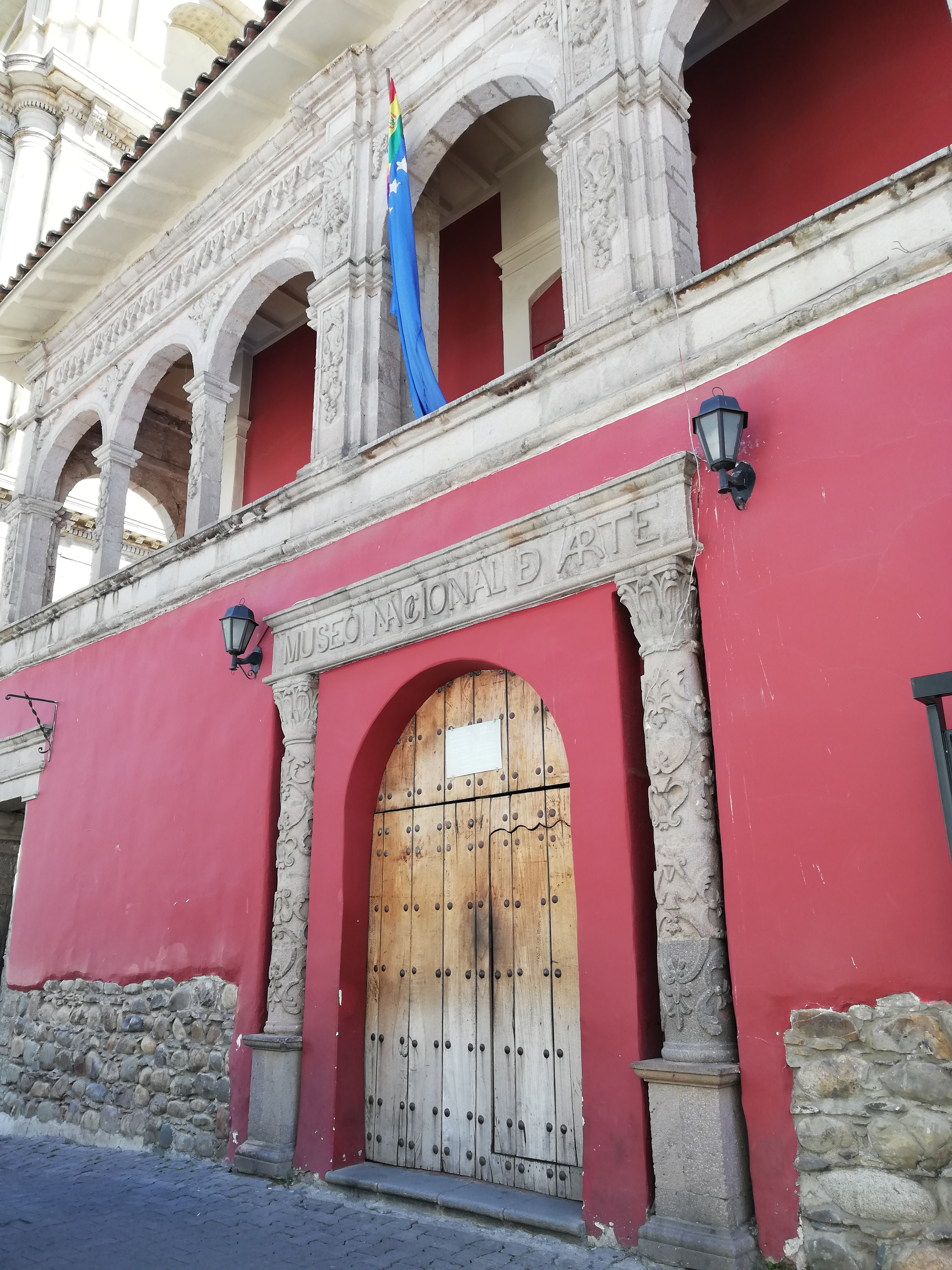
- Established: 1964; 62 years ago
- Location: La Paz, Bolivia
- Coordinates: 16°29′45″S 68°08′04″W

The National Museum of Art, Palacio Diez de Medina is a museum in the city of La Paz, Bolivia. It has an important permanent collection of colonial paintings, including canvases by Melchor Pérez de Holguín and Gregorio Gamarra.

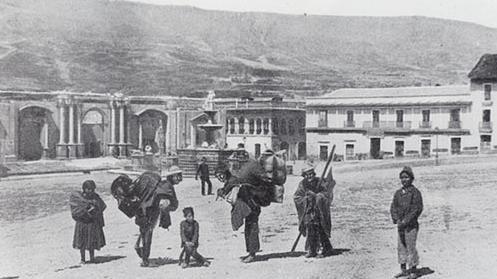
National Museum of Art in 1860 (in the background), during the construction of the cathedral.

== Location ==
The museum is located right in front of the main square of the city of La Paz, Plaza Murillo, specifically at the intersection of the pedestrian promenade Calle Comercio and Calle Socabaya.

== History ==
This building was the residence of the then Mayor Don Francisco Tadeo Diez de Medina y Vidango. Later it became the property of the Counts of Arana, subsequently during the La Paz revolution it became the property of the Marquises of Villaverde. At the end of the 19th century they functioned as the famous Gisbert hotel. In the year 1964, the palace was adapted to house the National Museum of Art of Bolivia, preserving its two courtyards and three levels. The main entrance is located on Socabaya Street.

== Architecture ==
The entrance shows a stone façade carved and decorated with baroque motifs that spanned the three levels of the building. At the meeting of Socabaya and Comercio streets, the corner stone column and the stone balcony stand out.

== Collections ==
=== Colonial and republican art ===
Some of the key painting in the collection include the following:

- Virgin of Fuencisla, 1723
- Virgin of the Hill, 1720
- Coronation of the Virgin by the Trinity and the Saints, 18th century
- Child Jesus with symbols of the Passion, Gregorio Gamarra
- Coronation of the Virgin, Gaspar Miguel de Berrío.

=== Contemporary art ===
The museum also has Bolivian, Latin American and international contemporary art in its collections such as those of Spanish artist Javier de Villota.

== Selected works ==
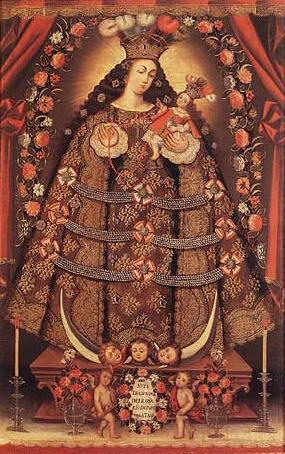
Anonymous. Virgin of Pomata, 1680

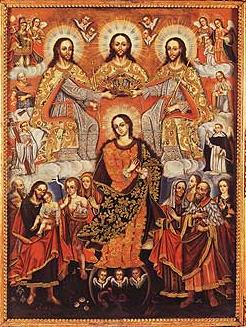
Gaspar Miguel de Berrío. Coronation of the Virgin, 18th century.

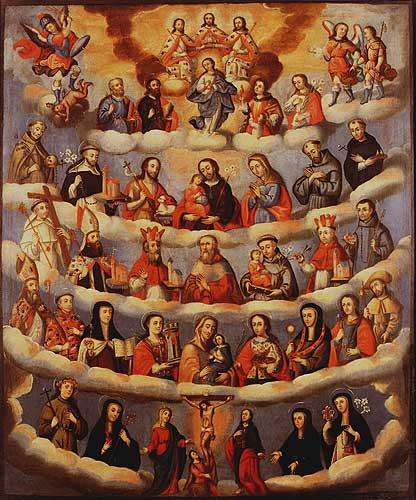
Anonymous. Virgin crowned by the Trinity and saints, 18th century.

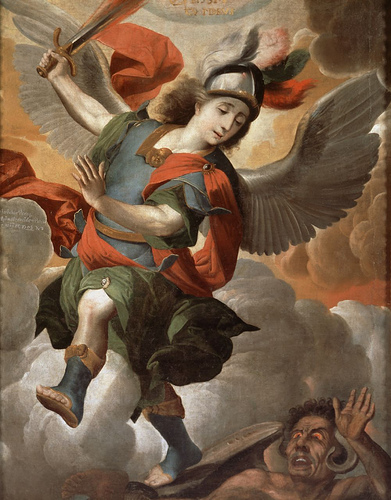
Anonymous. Saint Michael the Archangel, 1708.
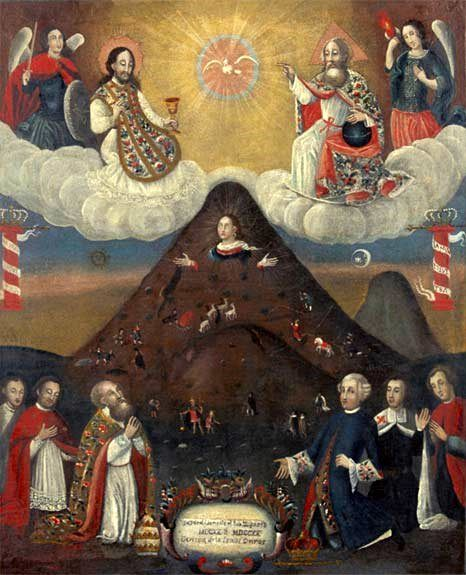
Anonymous. Virgin of the Cerro of Potosí, 1720.

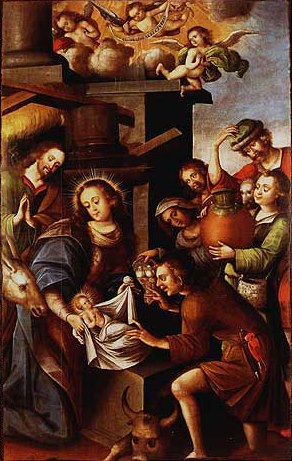
Leonardo Flores. Adoration of the shepherds, 17th century.

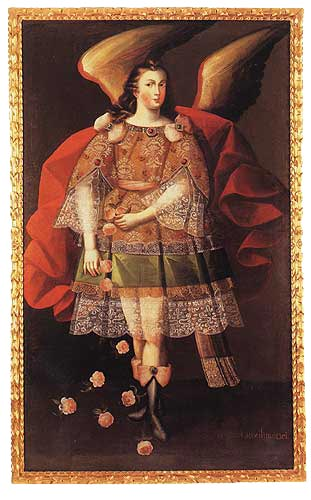
Anônimo. Anjo-Virtude, Baraquiel, século XVII.

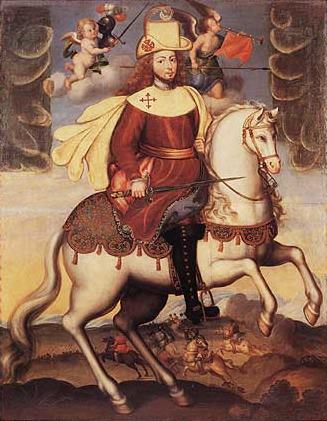
Anonymous. Portrait of Philip V as Santiago, 18th century.

== See also ==
- List of museums in Bolivia
