= Count of La Conquista =

County of La Conquista
- Creation date: 6 March 1770
- Created by: Charles III of Spain
- Peerage: Peerage of Spain
- First holder: Mateo de Toro Zambrano, 1st Count of La Conquista
- Present holder: Julio Manuel de Prado y Díez
- Status: Extant

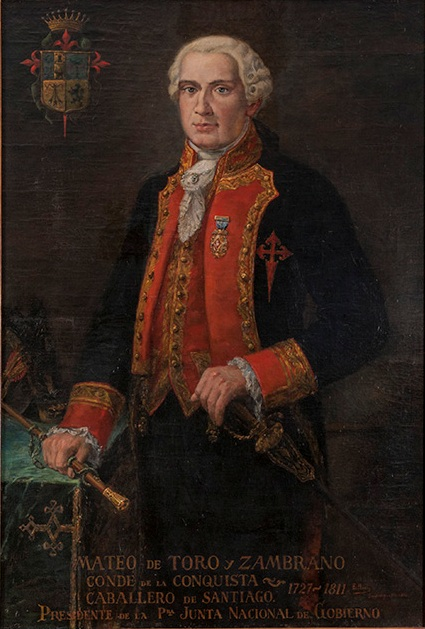
Don Mateo de Toro Zambrano

Count of La Conquista (Spanish: Conde de la Conquista) is an 18th-century Spanish hereditary title, famously held by Mateo de Toro Zambrano y Ureta, who was Royal Governor of Chile as well as President of the Government Junta of the Kingdom of Chile, which is generally seen as the first step of Chilean independence.

The title was created by King Charles III in 1770, based on Chilean estates to be inherited by primogeniture (Spanish: Mayorazgo) but was extinguished with the abolition of the nobility titles by the Chilean government after the Independence of that country from Spain. On March 5, 1857 it was revived by Queen Isabella II for the heir of the last holder.

== Counts of La Conquista ==
- Mateo de Toro-Zambrano y Ureta, 1st Count of La Conquista (1727–1811)
- Gregorio José de Toro-Zambrano y Valdés, 2nd Count of La Conquista (1758–1816)
- Manuel María de Toro-Zambrano y Dumont de Holdre, 3rd Count of La Conquista (1798–1818)
- María Nicolasa Isidora de las Mercedes de Toro-Zambrano y Dumont de Holdre, 4th Countess of La Conquista
- Rafael Correa de Saa y Toro-Zambrano, legitimate heir to the County of La Conquista (1824–1888)
- María Nicolasa Correa de Saa y Blanco, legitimate heiress to the County of La Conquista (1852–1909)
- Julio Prado y Colón de Carvajal, 5th Count of La Conquista
- Julio Manuel de Prado y Díez, 6th Count of La Conquista

== Sources ==
- Genealogical chart of family (in Spanish)
- 1940s Succession (in Spanish)
