= Figueroa mutiny =

The Figueroa mutiny (Spanish: Motín de Figueroa) was a failed attempt on April 1, 1811, to restore royal power in Chile and the first coup d'état in Chile.

== Background ==
When the First Government Junta decreed that elections were to be held for a National Congress, the decree left open to every administrative division of the country the decision of when to carry them. Immediately, political intrigue began amongst the ruling elite, with news of the political turbulence and wars of Europe all the while coming in. It was eventually decided that elections would be held in 1811. By March of that year all major cities had held them with the exception of Santiago and Valparaíso. The great surprise up to that point were the results from the other center of power, Concepción, in which Royalists had defeated the supporters of the president of the Junta, Juan Martínez de Rozas. In the rest of Chile, the results were more or less equally divided: twelve pro-Rozas delegates, fourteen anti-Rozas and three royalists. So, the Santiago elections were the key to Rozas's desire to remain in power. This election was supposed to take place on April 10, but before they could be called, the mutiny broke out.

== Mutiny ==
The origins of the mutiny were never fully clarified. Close to the expected day for elections, the monarchist Lieutenant Colonel Tomás de Figueroa, who considered the notion of elections to be too populist, led the revolt. The night before a group of mutineers (who were never identified) proclaimed Colonel Figueroa as their chief, and early on the morning of April 1, 1811, he went to the San Pablo Army Barracks, taking command and mutinying the troops, in the mistaken belief that he had the support of all the other army units in Santiago.

Once in control of the barracks, he paraded his troops, headed by drums, towards the main square with the intention of taking over the Government. He found the government palace empty, due to news of his mutiny. Nonplussed, he directed himself to the Real Audiencia, which was still in session. There, the judges calmly heard his requests of restoring the old regime, but resolved only to transcribe his demands to the government.

In the interval, members of the Junta under the command of Fernando Márquez de la Plata, sent Colonel Juan de Dios Vial del Río with an Army Battalion composed of 500 men to put down the mutiny. Brief combat ensued in the main square, but soon Figueroa's troops ran away or surrendered upon noticing the lack of support for their mutiny. Colonel Figueroa, seeing his defeat, took refuge in the Santo Domingo Monastery.

The populace, under the leadership of Friar Camilo Henríquez, reacted angrily against the mutineers. Martínez de Rozas, who had been extraordinarily absent during the whole course of events, ordered that the monastery be broken into and Colonel Figueroa arrested, violating his right of sanctuary. Rozas was well aware that if he didn't execute Figueroa quickly, the popular feeling would save him. So, he had him tried and sentenced to death in less than 24 hours.

When Figueroa was notified of his death sentence, he refused to name his co-conspirators and assumed full responsibility for the events. He was given four hours to prepare himself, and was executed the next morning (April 2, 1811), at 3:30 a.m. His body, with his face disfigured by bullets, was publicly exposed in the main square, outside the city jail.

== Aftermath ==
The mutiny disrupted the elections, which had to be delayed until November of the same year. In addition, the revolt was used as a pretext for dissolving the Real Audiencia, a longstanding pillar of Spanish crown control, and full independence gained momentum. Eventually, however, the Congress was duly elected. Moderates advocating only greater autonomy of the elites from Spanish Imperial control, without a complete rupture, gained the majority of seats, while a minority were held by revolutionaries who wanted complete and immediate Independence from Spain.

The popular feeling, that originally had reacted against Figueroa, was soon directed against Rozas. The fact that he had not led the defense of the government, and the fear of reprisals in case of a Royalist restoration made him very unpopular, and it became politically expedient to get rid of him as soon as possible. He was immediately replaced as leader of the Junta by Fernando Marquez de la Plata, and the very next year he was banished by his political rival, José Miguel Carrera, never to recover power.

== See also ==
- Chilean Independence
- History of Chile
- List of Chilean coups d'état
- First Chilean National Congress
