= Juan Martínez de Rozas =

Chilean lawyer and politician (1759–1813)

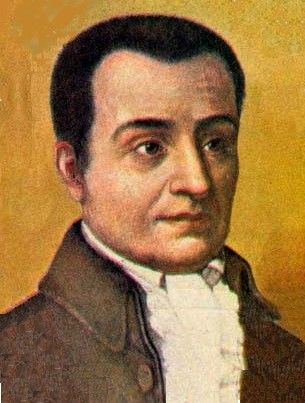

Interim President of Government Junta
- In office February 27, 1811 – April 2, 1811
- Preceded by: Mateo de Toro Zambrano
- Succeeded by: Fernando; Márquez de la Plata

Personal details
- Born: Juan Martínez de Rozas Correa; 1759 Mendoza, Captaincy General of Chile, Kingdom of Spain
- Died: March 3, 1813 (aged 53) Mendoza, United Provinces of the Rio de la Plata
- Parent(s): María Correa y Villegas; Juan Martínez de Soto y Rozas
- Education: Royal University of San Felipe

Juan Martínez de Rozas Correa (December 28, 1759 – May 16, 1813) was a Chilean lawyer and politician, he was also the first leader in the Chilean fight for independence.

== Biography ==
He was born at Mendoza (then, still a Chilean dependency), the son of Juan Martínez de Soto Rozas and María Prudencia Correa Villegas. In his early life he was a professor of law, theology and philosophy at Santiago. He held the post of acting governor of Concepción at one time, and was also colonel in a militia regiment.

In 1808 he became secretary to the last Spanish governor, Francisco Antonio García Carrasco, and used his position to prepare the nationalist movement that began in 1809. After resigning his position as secretary, Rozas was mainly responsible for the resignation of the Spanish governor, and the formation of a national Junta on September 18, 1810 of which he was the real leader. After the death of the President and Vice President of the First Government Junta, he acted as Interim President.

Under his influence many reforms were initiated, freedom of trade was established, an army was organized and a national congress was called together in July 1811. His influence began to wane with the Figueroa mutiny, and by the end of 1811 divisions began to arise between Rozas followers from Concepción and the men of Santiago. Also a feud broke out between Rozas and José Miguel Carrera, who had secured control of Santiago. In 1812 Carrera succeeded in securing the banishment of his rival, who was forced to retire to Mendoza, where he died on May 16, 1813.

== See also ==
- Scorpion scandal
- Chilean Independence
- Figueroa mutiny
- Juan Albano Pereira Márquez

Government offices
Preceded by Mateo de Toro Zambrano	Interim President of Government Junta; 1811	Succeeded by Fernando; Márquez de la Plata
