= Rafael Balmaceda =

Chilean politician and diplomat

José Rafael Balmaceda
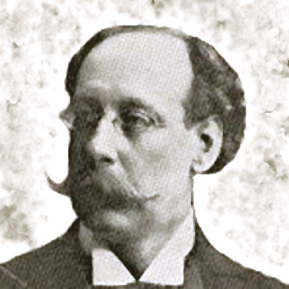
- Born: August 23, 1850; Renca, Chile
- Died: August 7, 1911 (aged 60); Santiago, Chile

José Rafael del Carmen Balmaceda Fernández (August 23, 1850 – August 7, 1911) was a Chilean politician, diplomat and brother of President José Manuel Balmaceda. He was of Basque descent.

== Early life ==
He was born in Renca, the son of Manuel José Balmaceda Ballesteros and of Encarnación Fernández Salas. He completed his studies at the Instituto Nacional and then attended the University of Louvain, where he graduated with a doctorate in Political Science. Early in his life he dedicated most of his time to his Hacienda San José in Puente Alto.

== Political career ==
José Rafael Balmaceda started his political career by joining the Liberal Party and was promptly elected deputy for "Angol" (1888–1891) and was reelected for the "Balmaceda" congress as a deputy for "Concepción and Talcahuano", but this congress was dissolved after only a few months. After the 1891 Chilean Civil War that deposed his brother, President José Manuel Balmaceda, his house was looted, and he was exiled together with his family. In Buenos Aires, Argentina he published "The revolution and condemnation of the Vicuña ministry", under the pseudonym "Nemo", in which he defended his brother's policies and attacked the revolutionary party. He also published "History Pages" and "Death of Balmaceda".

After being allowed to return to Chile, he concentrated his efforts on the reconstruction of the political base that had been defeated in the war and became the force behind the Liberal Democratic Party. On the congressional elections of 1894 he was elected deputy for "La Serena, Elqui and Coquimbo" (1894–1897) and was reelected for the same region (1897–1900). On November 19, 1901, President Germán Riesco appointed him Minister of Justice and Public Instruction, position he held until November 20, 1902, and later Minister of the Interior from March 18, 1905 to August 1, 1905.

In 1906, his son Ernesto was murdered in Belgium, prompting a celebrated case that came to define diplomatic privileges and immunities for the retinue and families of diplomatic staff.

President Pedro Montt appointed him Minister of Foreign Affairs, Cult and Colonization on August 29, 1908, a position he held until June 15, 1909. In 1909, he was elected a Senator for "Coquimbo" (1909–1915), but he died in Santiago before the end of his term in 1911 at the age of 61.

== Personal life ==
Balmaceda married Ana Bello Codesido, and together they had seven children.

== See also ==
- 1891 Chilean Civil War
- Balmaceda family

Political offices
Preceded by Joaquín Fernández	Minister of Justice and Public Instruction; 1901-1902	Succeeded by Rafael Orrego
Preceded by Emilio Bello	Minister of the Interior; 1905	Succeeded by Juan Antonio Orrego
Preceded by Federico Puga	Minister of Foreign Affairs, Cult and Colonization; 1908-1909	Succeeded by Agustín Edwards Mac Clure
