= Melquíades Valderrama =

Chilean lawyer and politician

Melquíades Valderrama Sáenz de la Peña (1838–1895) was a Chilean lawyer. He was Minister of Foreign Affairs and Colonization of Chile (1880–1881).
