= Luis Muñoz de Guzmán =

Royal Governor of Chile (1735–1808)

Don Luis Muñoz de Guzmán Caballero de Santiago
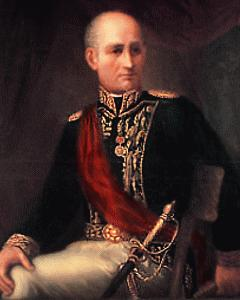

Royal Governor of Chile
- In office 30 January 1802 – 11 February 1808
- Monarch: Charles IV
- Prime Minister: Manuel de Godoy
- Preceded by: Francisco Tadeo Diez de Medina
- Succeeded by: Juan Rodríguez Ballesteros

Royal Governor of Quito
- In office 1791 – 1799
- Monarch: Charles IV

Personal details
- Born: 1735 Seville, Spain
- Died: 11 February 1808 (aged 72–73) Santiago, Chile
- Spouse: María Luisa Esterripa

Military service
- Allegiance: Spanish Empire
- Branch/service: Spanish Navy
- Years of service: 1748–1808
- Rank: Teniente general de la Armada
- Battles/wars: Siege of Melilla; Spanish-Portuguese War

Luis Muñoz de Guzmán y Montero de Espinosa (1735 – 11 February 1808) was a Spanish naval officer and colonial administrator who served as Royal Governor of Quito and Royal Governor of Chile.

== Biography ==
Muñoz de Guzmán was born in 1735 in Seville, Spain to a noble family.

On January 29th, 1748, he enlisted into the Spanish Navy as a Midshipman. In 1751, he was promoted to ensign. In 1755, he was assigned to the Ship of the line Dragón, where he served for 2 years before briefly serving on the frigate Victoria. He then took part in the Dichoso's royal escort of Charles III from Naples to Barcelona. He then left sea service, serving as the aide-de-camp to the fleet under command of Agustín de Miáquez before shortly resigning. He then was promoted to frigate lieutenant while commanding the frigate Janson in 1766.

He then later returned to the sea upon the Oriente. He received a promotion to Lieutenant of the Navy in September of 1767. He then served in the Siege of Melilla in 1774 during the Morocco Campaign. He later served in the Spanish-Portuguese War in 1777, including the capture of Santa Catarina. He was then appointed to President of the Audience of Quito in 1791. His daughter was born around the next year. In 1796, his wife, Maria Luisa Esterripa, requested his relief so they could return home to Spain. They remained in Quito until 1799, where Muñoz de Guzmán resigned as revolutionary sentiment grew. He attempted to return home, but was stuck in South America due to the war with Britain. He was then appointed to Royal Governor of Chile in 1801. He and his wife arrived in Santiago in 1802, where he received his promotion to Teniente general de la Armada.

He then died in the early morning of February 11th 1808. He was buried at the high altar of the Cathedral of Santiago.

== Sources ==
- Castedo, Leopoldo (1954). Resumen de la Historia de Chile de Francisco Antonio Encina (in Spanish). Vol. 2. Santiago, Chile: Empresa Editora Zig-Zag.
- Encina, Francisco Antonio (1940–1952). Historia de Chile: desde la prehistoria hasta 1891 (in Spanish). Vol. I–XX. Santiago, Chile: Editorial Nascimento.
- Medina, José Toribio (1906). Diccionario Biográfico Colonial de Chile (PDF) (in Spanish). Santiago, Chile: Imprenta Elzeviriana. p. 562.

Government offices
Preceded by Francisco Tadeo Diez de Medina	Royal Governor of Chile; 1802–1808	Succeeded by Juan Rodríguez Ballesteros
Military offices
Preceded by Francisco Tadeo Diez de Medina	Captain General of Chile; 1802–1808	Succeeded by Francisco García Carrasco
