= Colchagua Partido =

Administrative division of the Spanish Empire in the Captaincy General of Chile

- Capital: Villa de San Fernando de Tinguiririca
Preceded by	Succeeded by
Colchagua Corregimiento	Colchagua Delegation

The Colchagua Partido was an administrative division of the Spanish Empire, within the Captaincy General of Chile. It was created in 1786 from the territory of Colchagua corregimiento and its capital was the Villa de San Fernando de Tinguiririca. The district was commanded by a partido subdelegate, who presided over the local council, or cabildo. In 1793 the partido was reorganized after the Curicó partido seceded from it.

Colchagua Partido was also a part of the Santiago Intendencia.

It existed as an administrative district until the 1820s, when Chile declared independence from Spain. The partido was not included in the Constitution of 1823 and its territory went on to become the Colchagua Delegation of Chile.
