= Francisco Antonio García Carrasco =

Spanish soldier

His Excellency Francisco García Carrasco
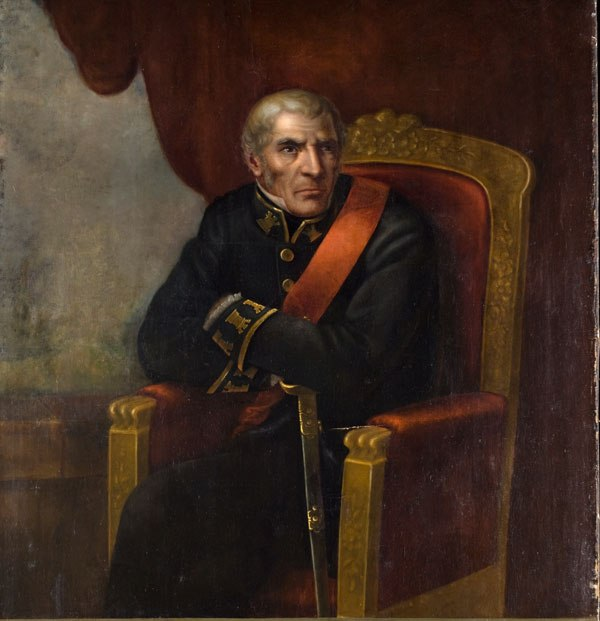

Royal Governor of Chile
- In office April 22, 1808 – July 16, 1810
- Monarch: Charles IV
- Preceded by: Juan Rodríguez Ballesteros
- Succeeded by: Mateo de Toro Zambrano (As President of Chile)

Personal details
- Born: 15 December 1742 Ceuta, Spain
- Died: 10 August 1813 (aged 70) Lima, Peru
- Profession: Brigadier General

Francisco Antonio García Carrasco Díaz (December 15, 1742 – August 10, 1813) was a Spanish soldier and Royal Governor of Chile. His political relations with Juan Martinez de Rozas and a smuggling scandal involving the frigate Scorpion destroyed what little authority he had, and required that he surrender his post to Mateo de Toro Zambrano President of the first government board. He was the last governor to rule before the Chilean independence movement swept the country.

== Early life ==
García Carrasco was born in Ceuta, the son of the Artillery Lieutenant Antonio García Carrasco and of Rosa Díaz. He joined the Royal Spanish Army as an infantry cadet on September 29, 1757. He was promoted regularly, until Lieutenant Colonel of infantry and engineers on July 1, 1784.

In 1785 García Carrasco was sent to the Viceroyalty of the Río de la Plata, to supervise the construction of the fortifications of Montevideo. In 1796, he was transferred to Santiago, Chile, as auditor for the construction of the Palacio de La Moneda, and later, as supervisor of the fortifications of the port of Valparaíso, of which he also was named interim Governor.

On February 26, 1802, he was promoted to Colonel of infantry and chief engineer, and on November 29, 1806, to Brigadier and director of the Army engineers corps of the Division of Indias. Governor Luis Muñoz de Guzmán charged him with the inspection of the fortification system in southern Chile, and he was living in Concepción when Gov. Muñoz de Guzmán suddenly died in February 1808.

== As Governor of Chile ==
=== Background ===
At the start of 1808, the Captaincy General of Chile—one of the smallest and poorest colonies in the Spanish Empire—was under the administration of Luis Muñoz de Guzmán, an able, respected and well-liked Royal Governor. In May 1808 the overthrow of Charles IV and Ferdinand VII, their replacement by Joseph Bonaparte and the start of the Peninsular War plunged the empire into a state of agitation.

When Gov. Muñoz de Guzmán suddenly died on February of that year, the crown was unable to appoint a new governor. After a brief interim regency by Juan Rodríguez Ballesteros, and according to the succession law in place at the time, the position was laid claim to and assumed by the most senior military commander, who happened to be Brigadier García Carrasco. García Carrasco took over the post of Governor of Chile on April 22 and in August the news of the Napoleonic invasion of Spain and of the conformation of a Supreme Central Junta to govern the Empire in the absence of a legitimate king reached the country. In the meantime, Charlotte Joaquina, sister of Ferdinand and wife of the King of Portugal, who was living in Brazil, also made attempts to obtain the administration of the Spanish dominions in Latin America. Since her father and brother were being held prisoners in France, she regarded herself as the heiress of her captured family. Allegedly among her plans was to send armies to occupy Buenos Aires and northern Argentina and to style herself as Queen of La Plata.

=== Administration ===
Brigadier García Carrasco turned out to be a man of crude and authoritarian manners, who managed in a very short time to alienate the criollo elites under his command. Already in Chile, as in most of Latin America, there had been some independence agitation but very minimal and concentrated in the very ineffectual Conspiracy of the Tres Antonios back in 1781. The majority of the people were fervent royalists but were divided into two groups: those who favored the status quo and the divine right of Ferdinand VII (known as absolutists) and those who wanted to proclaim Charlotte Joaquina as Queen (known as carlotists). A third group was composed of those who proposed the replacement of the Spanish authorities with a local junta of notable citizens, which would conform a provisional government to rule in the absence of the king and an independent Spain (known as juntistas).

=== Deposition ===
In 1809 Governor García Carrasco himself was implicated in a flagrant case of corruption that managed to destroy whatever remnants of moral authority he or his office had left. From that moment on the pressure for his removal began to build. In June 1810 news arrived from Buenos Aires that Napoleon Bonaparte's forces had conquered Andalusia and laid siege to Cádiz, the last redoubt against the French on Spanish soil. Moreover, the Supreme Central Junta, which had governed the Empire for the past two years, had abolished itself in favor of a Regency Council. García Carrasco, who was a supporter of the carlotist group, managed to magnify the political problems by taking arbitrary and harsh measures, such as the arrest and deportation to Lima without due process of well-known and socially prominent citizens under simple suspicions of having been sympathetic to the junta idea. Among those arrested were José Antonio de Rojas, Juan Antonio Ovalle and Bernardo de Vera y Pintado.

The autonomy movement also had, inspired by the May Revolution in Argentina, thoroughly propagated through the criollo elite. They resented the illegal arrests and, together with the news that Cádiz was all that was left of a free Spain, finally solidified in their opposition to the Governor. Brigadier García Carrasco was suspended from office and forced to resign on July 16, 1810, to be in turn replaced by the next most senior soldier, Mateo de Toro Zambrano, 1st Count of la Conquista, even though a legitimate Governor, Francisco Javier de Elío, had already been appointed by the Viceroy of Peru.

== Later life ==
After his deposition, García Carrasco settled to a quiet life in a rural property near Santiago. On April 1, 1811, the Figueroa mutiny broke out in Santiago. Though the revolt soon sputtered, and Figueroa was arrested and summarily executed, García Carrasco was arrested and speedily deported. He left Valparaíso on July 4 and arrived to Lima, Peru on August 27, where he died two years later, in 1813.

== Additional information ==
=== See also ===
- Chilean War of Independence
- Scorpion scandal
- Figueroa mutiny

=== Sources ===
- Barros Arana, Diego (1855). Historia Jeneral de la Independencia de Chile (in Spanish). Vol. I–IV. Santiago, Chile: Imprenta del Ferrocarril.
- Barros Arana, Diego (1884–1902). Historia Jeneral de Chile (in Spanish). Vol. I–XVI. Santiago, Chile: Rafael Jover. ISBN 9780598482334.
- Medina, José Toribio (1906). Diccionario Biográfico Colonial de Chile (PDF) (in Spanish). Santiago, Chile: Imprenta Elzeviriana. pp. 331–332.

Government offices
Preceded by Juan Rodríguez Ballesteros	Royal Governor of Chile; 1808–1810	Succeeded by Mateo de Toro Zambrano
Military offices
Preceded by Luis Muñoz de Guzmán	Captain General of Chile; 1808–1810	Succeeded by Mateo de Toro Zambrano
