= Real Audiencia of Santiago =

Chilean royal law court of the Spanish colonial period

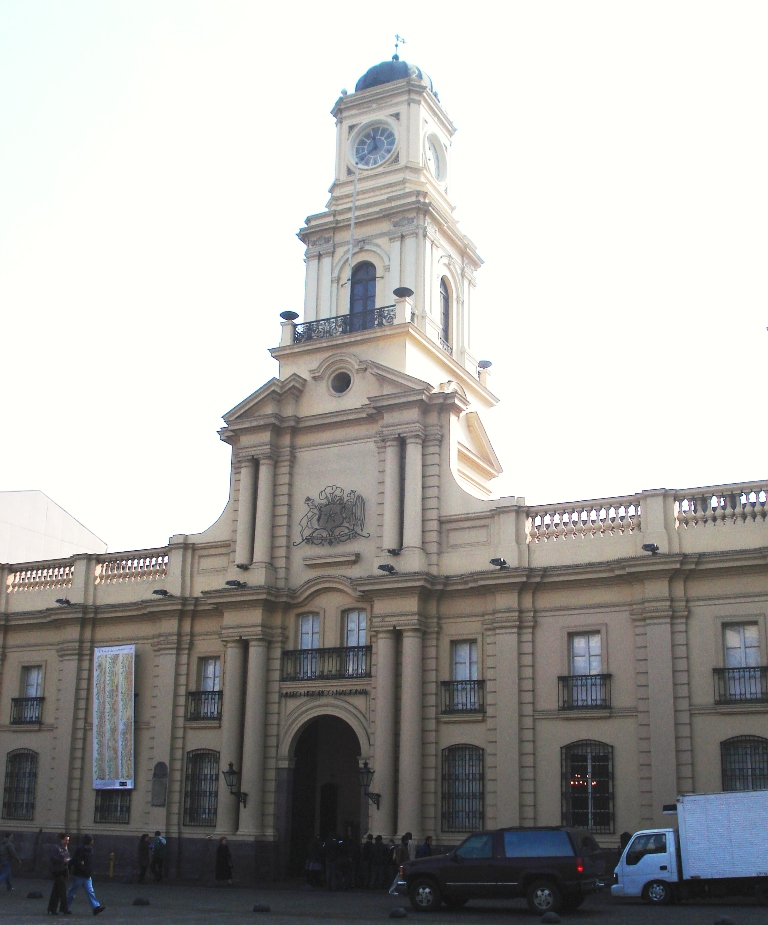

The Royal Audiencia of Santiago (Spanish: Real Audiencia de Santiago) was an Audiencia Real or royal law court that functioned in Santiago de Chile during the Spanish colonial period. This body heard both civil and criminal cases. It was founded during the 17th century and abolished in 1817.

== Structure ==
Law XII (Audiencia y Chancillería Real de Santiago de Chile) of Title XV (De las Audiencias y Chancillerias Reales de las Indias) of Book II of the Recopilación de Leyes de las Indias of 1680—which reproduces Philip IV's decree of February 17, 1609—describes the limits and functions of the Audiencia.

In the city of Santiago de Chile shall reside another Royal Audiencia and Chancellery of ours, with a president-governor-captain general; four judges of civil cases [oidores], who shall also be judges of criminal cases [alcaldes del crimen]; a crown attorney [fiscal]; a bailiff [alguacil mayor]; a lieutenant of the Gran Chancellor; and the other necessary ministers and officials, which will have for district all of said Kingdom of Chile, with the cities, towns, places and lands, which are included in the government of those provinces, including what is now pacified and populated, as well as what shall be subdued, populated and pacified inside and outside the Straits of Magellan and inland to the Cuyo Province, inclusive. And we order that said president-governor-captain general govern and administer its government (gobernación) in all matters and by all means, and that said Audiencia, nor any other minister interfere in this, except our Viceroy of Peru, in the cases, which comply with the laws in this book and as permitted by our orders, and that said president do not intervene in matters of justice, and leave the oidores to decree in them freely, and that all sign that which they decree, sentence or dispatch.

The Province of Cuyo was transferred to the Audiencia of Buenos Aires, when the Viceroyalty of the Río de la Plata was created in the late eighteenth century.

The President of the Audiencia, was the Governor of Chile himself. In 1776, after the reforms of the Indian Audiences, the office of Regent was created who assumed the leadership of the court. The position of Regent was held by :

- Tomás Antonio Álvarez de Acevedo y Robles (1776-1788),
- Francisco Antonio Moreno y Escandón (1788-1792),
- José de Rezabal y Ugarte (1792-1803),
- Fernando Márquez de la Plata (1803-1806),
- Juan Rodríguez Ballesteros (1806-1811).

== Independence ==
The Audiencia it was dissolved in 1810 after the election of the First Government Junta of the Kingdom of Chile with the resignation of some of its hearers and the exile of others, being replaced by a Court of Appeals, which was the first judicial court of the Government of Chile.

With the restoration of the old regime, after the battle of Rancagua, the governor Mariano Osorio surely reopened the court (1814), which he presented until 1817 when it was finally shut down by the independent government of Bernardo O'Higgins, again replaced by a new appeals court, this time called the Cámara de Apelaciones. This was in turn the ancestor of today's Chilean Appeals Court in Santiago.

== Sources ==
- Barrientos Grandon, Javier (1992): «Las reformas de Carlos III y la Real Audiencia de Santiago», en Temas de Derecho de la Universidad Gabriela Mistral, Nº 2. p. 23-46
- Barrientos Grandon, Javier (1993): «La Real Audiencia de Concepción (1565-1575)», en Revista de estudios histórico-jurídicos de la Universidad Católica de Valparaíso, vol. 1992-1993, Nº 15. p. 131-178
- Barrientos Grandon, Javier (2000), La Real Audiencia de Chile. La institución y sus hombres 1605-1817, Madrid: Fundación Histórica Tavera. CD-ROM, Nuevas Aportaciones a la Historia Jurídica de Iberoamérica.
- Barrientos Grandon, Javier (2003): «La creación de la Real Audiencia de Santiago de Chile y sus ministros fundadores: Sobre la formación de familias en la judicatura chilena», en Revista de estudios histórico-jurídicos de la Universidad Católica de Valparaíso, Nº 25. p. 233-338
- Muñoz Feliu, Raúl (1937), La real audiencia de Chile, Santiago de Chile. Tesis de licenciatura.
- Valenzuela, Jaime (1998): «Conflicto y equilibrios simbólicos ante un nuevo actor político: la Real Audiencia en Santiago desde 1609», en Cuadernos de Historia de la Universidad de Chile, Nº 18. p. 115-138
