= Mateo de Toro Zambrano =

Spanish colonial administrator of Chile (1727–1811)

His Excellency Mateo de Toro Zambrano KOS
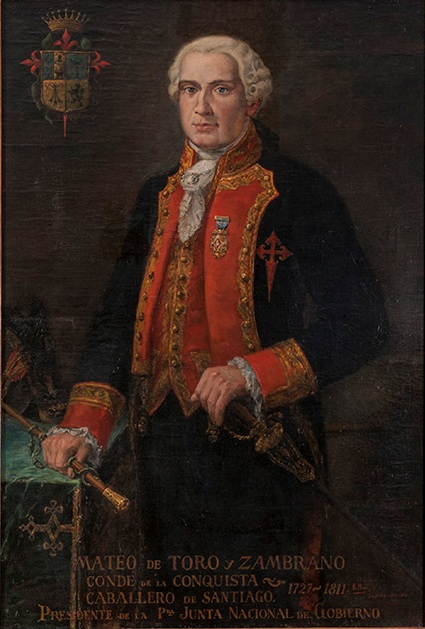

Royal Governor of Chile
- In office July 16, 1810 – September 18, 1810 (Interim)
- Monarch: Ferdinand VII
- Preceded by: Francisco García Carrasco
- Succeeded by: José Antonio Pareja (as Captain General)

President of Government Junta
- In office September 18, 1810 – February 26, 1811
- Preceded by: Position Established
- Succeeded by: Juan Martínez de Rozas

Personal details
- Born: 20 September 1727 Santiago, Chile
- Died: 26 February 1811 (aged 83) Santiago, Chile
- Spouse: María Nicolasa de Valdés
- Children: José María, Gregorio José, María Josefa, José Joaquín, Domingo José, María Mercedes, Mariana, María Inés, María de los Dolores, María del Rosario Josefa
- Profession: Field Marshal

Mateo de Toro Zambrano y Ureta, 1st Count of La Conquista (September 20, 1727 – February 26, 1811), was a prominent Spanish military and political figure of Criollo descent. He held the position of a knight in the Order of Santiago and was the lord of the Toro-Zambrano estate.

Toro Zambrano earned great respect during the final years of colonial Chile, occupying significant roles in both the military and local administration. In 1810, following Francisco Antonio García Carrasco's resignation, he stepped into the role of interim president-governor and captain general of Chile. While in this capacity, he faced persistent pressure to establish a governing junta in the region, a stance he opposed. On September 18, 1810, he assumed the presidency of the First National Government Junta of Chile, becoming the initial leader of the autonomist movement that eventually led to Chile's independence.

== Early life ==
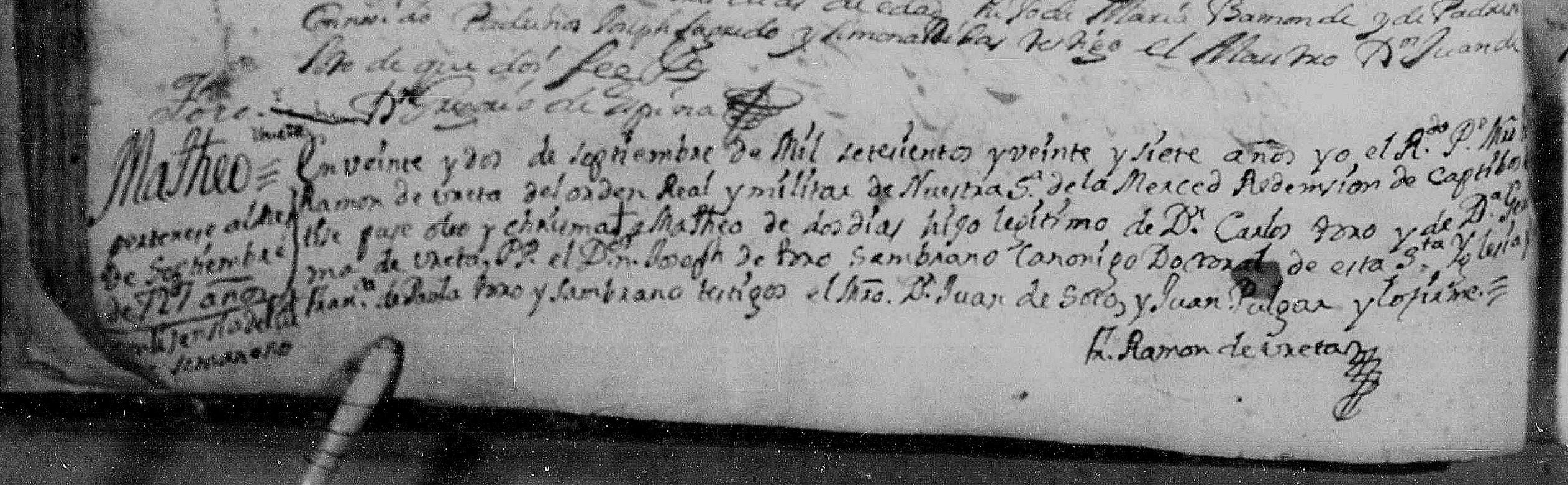
Baptismal record of Mateo, located in the parish archive of El Sagrario, Santiago de Chile.

Born in Santiago, Toro Zambrano came from an aristocratic lineage, being the legitimate son of Carlos José de Toro-Zambrano y Escobar and Jerónima de Ureta y Prado. His parents were prominent individuals in Santiago, known for their social and economic status. Mateo's baptismal name was Matheo de Toro-Zambrano Ureta, sharing the name with an older brother who died before his first birthday.

Toro Zambrano was related to José Miguel Carrera's grandfather through his maternal lineage. His mother was the sister of Francisca de Ureta y Prado, who was the mother of Ignacio de la Carrera y Ureta. This connection tied him to the lineage of Ignacio de la Carrera y Cuevas, a celebrated Chilean national hero. Furthermore, his maternal grandmother's family, the Prado family, could trace their origins back to the Inca emperor Manco Cápac, establishing a direct descent from the Inca lineage.

== Civic and military career ==
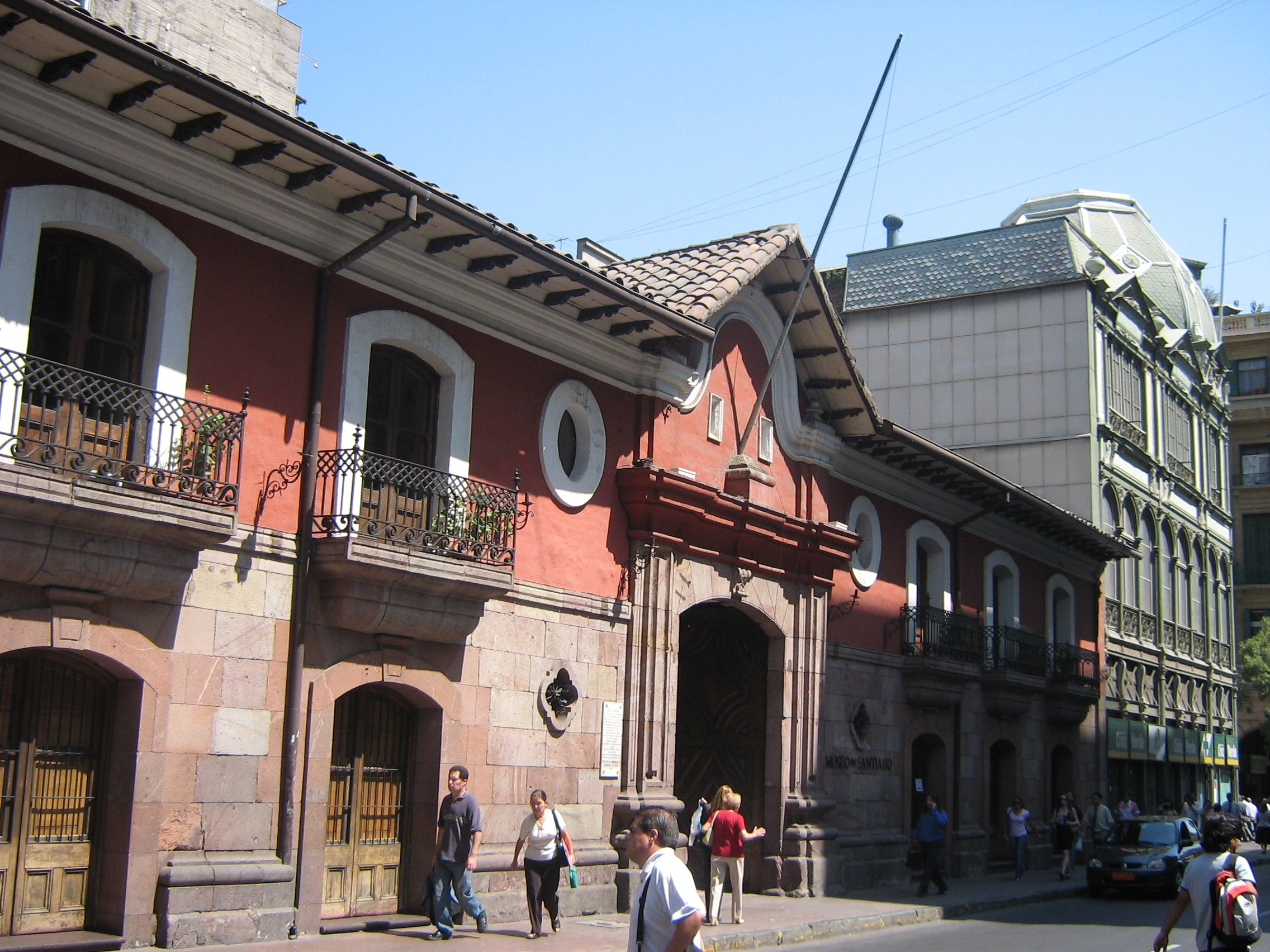
Casa Colorada was the residence of Mateo de Toro Zambrano and currently houses the Museum of Santiago.

Widely regarded by historians and scholars, Toro Zambrano is considered one of Chile's most esteemed historical figures. José Perfecto de Salas described him succinctly: "Don Mateo Toro, magistrate. Honor of the Creole spirit; few words; great judgment; significant wealth; a truly good man" (1762).

Toro Zambrano served in various civic and military capacities, including as a councilman of the Santiago council, water magistrate (1750), and ordinary mayor of the city (1761). He was appointed magistrate of Santiago, mayor of mines, and lieutenant of the captain general by Manuel de Amat y Juniet in 1761. He reclaimed these roles in 1768.

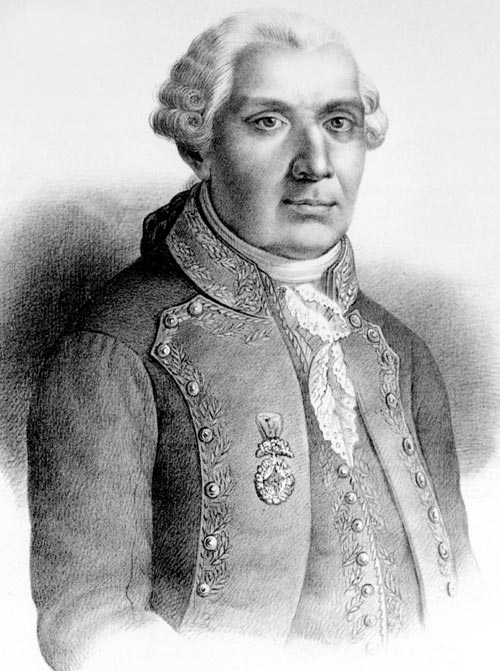
Mateo de Toro Zambrano y Ureta.

Toro Zambrano was known for his strict adherence to regulations and a strong sense of duty. When the council lacked funds for the construction of Mapocho River dikes, he personally financed the work. In 1769, during an uprising by the Pehuenche people in the Biobío region, he funded a cavalry company, named "Prince of Asturias," led by his own son José Gregorio. This company guarded the Piuquenes Pass in the Santiago foothills.

On July 16, 1810, following Governor Francisco García Carrasco's resignation, Toro Zambrano became interim governor of the Captaincy General of Chile. On September 18 of the same year, he was elected president of the First National Government Junta, marking the establishment of Chile's inaugural autonomous government.

His death in the subsequent year prevented Toro Zambrano from playing a more extensive role in Chile's journey to independence.

== Noble titles ==
Due to his honorable achievements, both from local governors and the Spanish Crown, Toro Zambrano pursued a Castilian title for himself and his descendants. His persistence and the commendations that reached the Spanish court led to success. On March 6, 1770, a royal decree granted him the title of Count of Conquista, alluding to the conquest of the Canary Islands, in which his ancestor Juan de Toro played a significant role. Additionally, he was exempted from the service of lances, a privilege granted to him and other aspiring Chilean nobles through a royal decree on May 25, 1779.

== Family ==
Toro Zambrano married María Nicolasa de Valdés y de la Carrera on May 3, 1751, in Santiago. They had ten children together. Their eldest son died, making the second son, José Gregorio, the heir to the title and family estate. José Gregorio studied Law in Spain and became a lieutenant colonel in the Spanish Army. While in Spain, he met Josefa Dumont de Holdre y Miquel, a woman associated with the Spanish court. They got married and had three children: Manuel María, José, and María Nicolasa Isidora de las Mercedes. They settled on the Compañía Estate in Graneros.

Due to the deaths of her brothers during the War of Independence, the daughter inherited the title and estate. As a result, the rightful heirs to the County of Conquest and the family estate's assets are the current descendants of the Correa de Saa and Toro-Zambrano family.

== Descendants ==
Arms of Toro Zambrano.

Mateo de Toro-Zambrano y Ureta and Nicolasa de Valdés y de la Carrera, the first Counts of Conquest, had the following children:

- José María de Toro-Zambrano y Valdés (1754-1780): He was a Knight of the Order of Charles III. He was the legitimate heir to the County of Conquest and the family estate but died young without marrying. He served as Assistant Major of the Royal Artillery Corps and participated in the war against Portugal. He was wounded and returned to Chile, becoming the Commander of the port and coast of Concepción.
- José Gregorio de Toro-Zambrano y Valdés (1758-1816): He became the II Count of Conquest and inherited the family estate after his elder brother's death. He served as Captain of the Prince of Asturias Militia Company and studied at the Seminary of Nobles in Madrid. He achieved the rank of lieutenant colonel in the Royal Armies. He married Josefa Dumont de Holdre y Miquel, and their descendants include various branches: Correa de Saa Toro-Zambrano, Correa de Saa Blanco, Correa de Saa Larraín, and more.
- María Josefa Romualda de Toro-Zambrano y Valdés (1759-1786): She married Pedro Flórez de Valdés y Cienfuegos. They had descendants with names like Flórez Toro-Zambrano and Pérez Flórez.
- Mariana de los Dolores de Toro-Zambrano y Valdés (1761-1851): She supported her cousins, the Carrera family, and sheltered Luis Carrera y Verdugo. She married José Antonio de Armaza y Juanotena and later Marcos Alonso Gamero. Their descendants include Armaza Toro-Zambrano and Gamero Toro-Zambrano.
- José Joaquín Eusebio de Toro-Zambrano y Valdés (1762-1836): He was a Knight of the Order of Santiago and participated in Chilean politics. He inherited the Alhué estate and married María del Carmen de Andía-Yrarrázabal. Their descendants include Toro-Zambrano Yrarrázabal and Toro-Zambrano Donoso.
- María Inés de Toro-Zambrano y Valdés: She married Pedro de Junco y Junco and resided in Spain.
- Manuela Javiera de las Mercedes de Toro-Zambrano y Valdés (1767-1828): She married Carlos de Vigil y Ramírez de Miranda and later José Santiago Martínez de Aldunate y Larraín. Their descendants include Vigil Toro-Zambrano.
- María de los Dolores de Toro-Zambrano y Valdés (1768-1769) and María del Rosario Josefa de Toro-Zambrano y Valdés (1772-1774): These children died at young ages.
- Domingo José Rafael de Toro-Zambrano y Valdés: He was a Knight of the Order of Alcántara, attended the Open Council of September 18, 1810, and served as Mayor of Santiago de Chile in 1811. He married María Mercedes de Guzmán y Lecaros, and their descendants include Toro-Zambrano Guzmán and Toro-Zambrano Necochea.

Government offices
Preceded by Francisco García Carrasco	Royal Governor of Chile; 1810	Succeeded by Mariano Osorio
Military offices
Preceded by Francisco García Carrasco	Captain General of Chile; 1810	Succeeded by Antonio Pareja
Political offices
New title	President of Government Junta; 1810–1811	Succeeded by Juan Martinez de Rozas
Spanish nobility
New title	Count of la Conquista; 1770–1811	Succeeded by Gregorio José de Toro
