= In Her Place (2024 film) =

2024 Chilean film

- Netflix release poster
- Spanish: El lugar de la otra
- Directed by: Maite Alberdi
- Screenplay by: Inés Bortagaray; Paloma Salas
- Based on: The Murderers by Alia Trabucco Zerán
- Produced by: Juan de Dios Larraín; Pablo Larraín; Rocío Jadue
- Starring: Elisa Zulueta; Francisca Lewin
- Cinematography: Sergio Armstrong
- Edited by: Alejandro Carrillo Penovi
- Music by: José Miguel Miranda; José Miguel Tobar
- Production company: Fábula
- Distributed by: Netflix
- Release dates: 23 September 2024 (SSIFF); 30 September 2024 (Chile)
- Running time: 89 minutes
- Country: Chile
- Language: Spanish

In Her Place (Spanish: El lugar de la otra) is a 2024 Chilean historical crime drama film directed by Maite Alberdi and starring Elisa Zulueta and Francisca Lewin. Based on the true story of writer María Carolina Geel, who in 1955 killed her lover at the Crillón Hotel, the film is a reinterpretation of a story in the book The Murderers by Alia Trabucco Zerán.

The film was screened in competition at the 72nd San Sebastián International Film Festival on 23 September 2024. It was selected as the Chilean entry for Best International Feature Film at the 97th Academy Awards, but was not nominated.

== Plot ==
In 1955, writer María Carolina Geel, who uses the pen name Georgina Silva, fatally shoots her lover Roberto Pumarino at the restaurant of the Hotel Crillón in Santiago and is put on trial for murder. The case becomes the focus of a media circus because of its circumstances, putting scrutiny on Aliro, the judge handling the case, and his paralegal assistant, Mercedes, who treats the case as a routine affair. Due to the controversial nature of the case, the trial is held without spectators, with only Aliro, Mercedes, Georgina, and the relevant lawyers and witnesses in attendance.

As the trial proceeds, Aliro and Mercedes learn that the case is inspired in part by a similar case in 1941 at the same hotel in which María Luisa Bombal shot her lover. They also learn from multiple witnesses that Georgina and Roberto's relationship was a volatile affair marked by moments of high passion and frequent rows. Georgina's former husband and sister defend her reputation, while Roberto's acquaintances paint a contrary picture. However, Mercedes is moved when a witness recalls Georgina angrily rejecting a vacuum cleaner gifted by Roberto and throwing into a river, saying that she did not want to conform to female stereotypes.

Mercedes begins to discreetly offer cigarettes to Georgina and volunteers to deliver her clothes when Aliro decides not to put her in jail and instead put her in the care of a women-only facility run by nuns. Mercedes is allowed access to Georgina's apartment, but is mesmerized by its appearance and evidence of Georgina's lifestyle, which she compares with her condition as an obedient housewife and mother in a working-class area. Mercedes then helps herself to the apartment's contents, using Georgina's accessories and dresses to work. She catches the attention of her family and workmates, but escapes scrutiny

Montero, the prosecutor in the case, tells Aliro that Georgina is enjoying luxuries while in custody. Aliro then orders Mercedes to take photographs of the shelter to verify the claims. While waiting for Georgina, Mercedes is moved when Rosa, a fellow detainee who asks her to take a photograph of her, tells her that she was incarcerated after killing her son-in-law for beating her pregnant daughter. Mercedes then enters Georgina's cell and speaks with her. Mercedes sees nothing irregular in her cell, but is again moved when Georgina tells her of how she feels free and tranquil in detention. Back home, Mercedes' husband, Efrain, notices her crying after he presents her with the “like new” floor buffer he finally got around to repairing, after her repeated requests. Mercedes then goes to Georgina's apartment to spend the night, but is followed and discovered there by Efrain, who tracks mud on the spotless floors and carpet. Efrain accuses her of going insane, but Mercedes says the apartment is the only place where she is at peace. Both then sleep at Georgina's bed.

Georgina, who invokes her right to silence throughout the trial, instead publishes her prison memoirs. The renewed attention to the case and Georgina's claims in the memoir that she was bearing greater responsibility to a crime committed together with Roberto prompts Aliro to convict Georgina of murder and sentence her to prison. However, Mercedes, who continues to break into Georgina's apartment, is disappointed after learning on the radio that Georgina has received a presidential pardon after her case becomes an international cause celebre. Mercedes then launders at a park in front of Georgina's apartment and sees Georgina arriving by car. The two exchange glances to acknowledge each other's respect before Georgina enters her residence.

== Cast ==
- Elisa Zulueta as Mercedes Arévalo
- Francisca Lewin as María Carolina Geel/Georgina Silva
- Marcial Tagle as Aliro Veloso
- Pablo Macaya as Efraín García
- Gabriel Urzúa as Domingo
- Cristián Carvajal as Luis Malaquías Concha
- Pablo Schwarz as Benjamín Montero
- Enrique Valenzuela as Gaspar García
- Lucas Jadue as Samuel García
- Sebastián Apiolaza as Retamal
- Adams Pino as Suárez
- Natalia Valdebenito as Matilde Ladrón de Guevara
- Francisca Feuerhake as Lucía Ladrón de Guevara
- Carlos Donoso as Rolando de la Fuente
- Néstor Cantillana as René Cárdenas
- Nicolás Saavedra as Roberto Pumarino
- Francisco Pérez-Bannen as Pedro Echeverría
- Mariana Loyola as Cora Danyau
- María José Parga as Adriana Silva
- Emilio Edwards as Walter Pumarino
- Felipe Zapata as Sergio Pumarino
- Nicolás Zárate as Mario Arnés
- Teresita Reyes as Madre Anunciación
- Rosario Bahamondes as Rosa Janequeo
- Guilherme Sepúlveda as Jorge Vargas
- Aaron Hernández as Fernando Arellano
- Muriel Miranda Rebeca Vizcaya
- Andrés Skoknic as Hernán Díaz Arrieta
- Luis Cerda as Hugo
- Gustavo Bacerra as Julio
- Agustín Moya as Pasmanik
- Patricio Strahovsky as neighbor
- Paloma Salas as client

== Production ==
In Her Place was filmed in Chile with cinematography by Sergio Armstrong. The film was produced by Fabula, while Mariane Hartard, Sergio Karmy, Cristián Donoso served as executive producers.

== Release ==
In Her Place premiered on 23 September 2024 at the 72nd San Sebastián International Film Festival. It was also had a limited theatrical release in select Chilean cinemas on 30 September 2024. The film became available on Netflix on 11 October 2024.

== Reception ==
=== Accolades ===
| Award | Ceremony date | Category | Recipient(s) | Result | Ref. |
|---|---|---|---|---|---|
| San Sebastián International Film Festival | 28 September 2024 | Golden Seashell | In Her Place | Nominated | |
| Forqué Awards | 14 December 2024 | Best Latin-American Film | In Her Place | Won | |
| Ariel Awards | 20 September 2025 | Best Ibero-American Film | In Her Place | Nominated | |

== See also ==
- List of submissions to the 97th Academy Awards for Best International Feature Film
- List of Chilean submissions for the Academy Award for Best International Feature Film
- List of Chilean films#2020s
