= Iglesia de las Agustinas (Santiago de Chile) =

Catholic church

Coordinates: 33.4422°S 70.6514°W

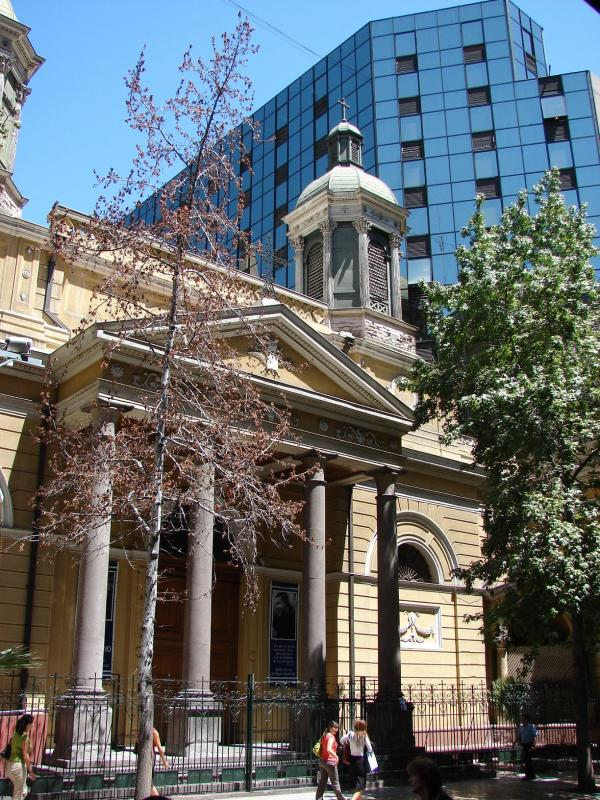

Religion
- Affiliation: Roman Catholic

Location
- Municipality: Santiago
- Country: Chile
- Interactive map of Iglesia de las Agustinas

Architecture
- Architect: Eusebio Chelli

The Iglesia de las Agustinas is a Catholic church, located in downtown Santiago, Chile. The church was declared as a National Monument in 1977.

== History ==
The convent of the Augustine sisters was founded in 1571. It was built on a city block bounded by the present day streets of Augustinas on the north, Ahumada on the east, Bandera on the west and the Moneda on the south. Earthquakes in 1647 and 1730 destroyed the first churches built both at the corner of Agustinas and Ahumada streets. By this period, a segment of Moneda street was closed to form a city block between Agustinas street and the Alameda. A modest third church was built on the same site.

In 1850, the site was newly divided into two city blocks to join the discontinuous segments of Moneda street. Land lots were sold over the following years, leaving the Augustine sisters congregation as the owner only of the southern city block. The fourth church was planned to be built on this block.

The foundation stone of the current church was laid in 1857, to a design of Vicente Larraín. Its construction was led by architect Eusebio Chelli. The first liturgies in the church were offered in 1871. A Walcker organ was installed in 1875, and the church was consecrated by the then archbishop of Santiago Mariano Casanova in 1888.

The church building was damaged by the 1906 and 1927 earthquakes. In 1912, the congregation was relocated to a building located on Vicuña Mackenna Avenue. The land was sold, except the church site, and divided into lots. The site plan included a Y-shaped street layout. The Edificio Ex Hotel Mundial, the Santiago Stock Exchange Building and the Club de la Unión were built on this site.

== Architecture ==
The church is Renaissance Revival in style, influenced by the Palladian architecture. The nave is separated from the aisles by Venetian arcades. The main facade features four Doric order columns that support a triangular pediment. It also features two corner cupolas.
