= Lucca railway station =

Station serving Lucca, Tuscany, Italy

Lucca
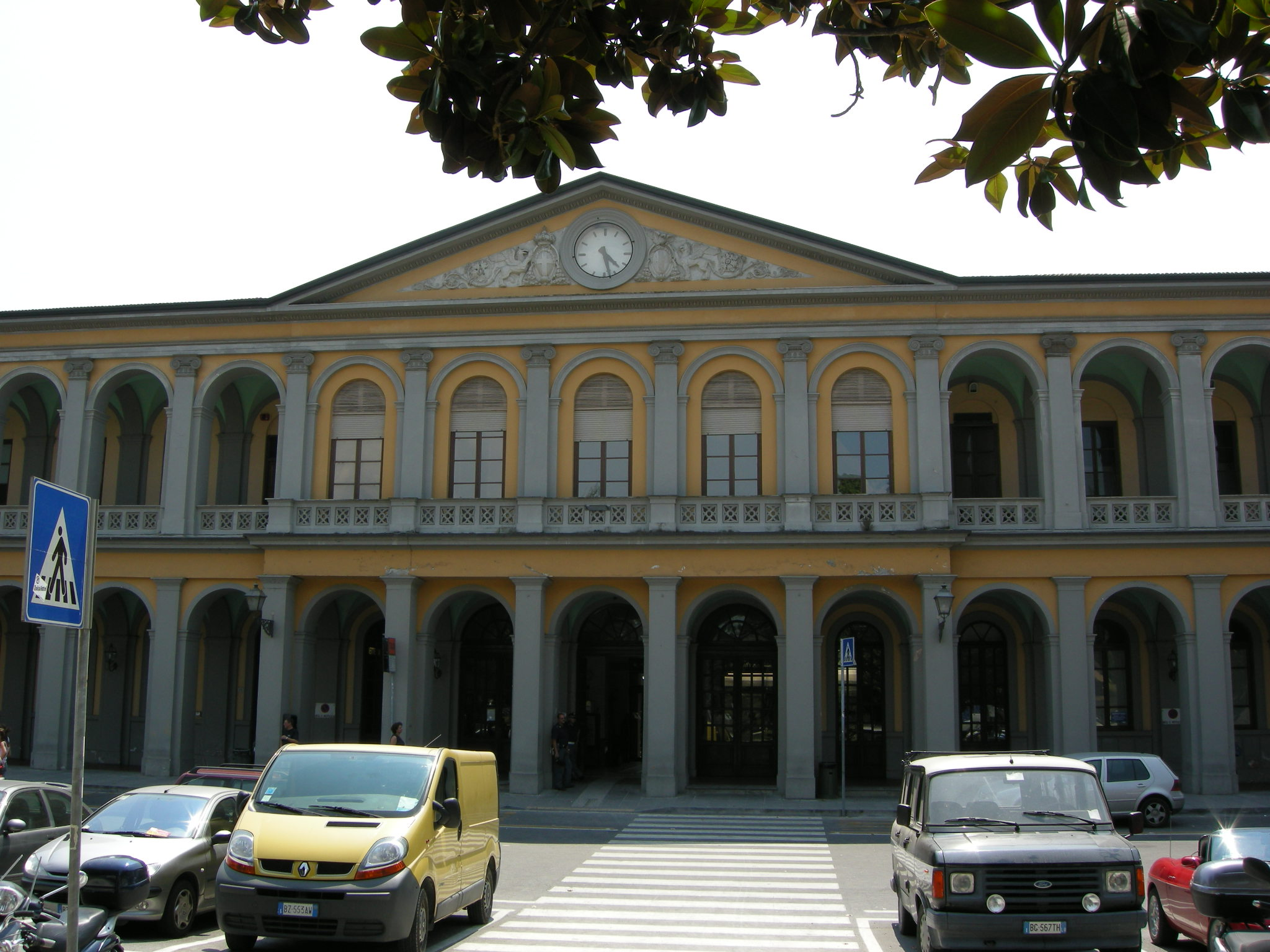
- Lucca's passenger building

General information
- Location: Piazza Ricasoli; 55100 Lucca LU; Lucca, Province of Lucca, Tuscany; Italy
- Coordinates: 43°50′15″N 10°30′22″E
- Elevation: 19
- Operator: Rete Ferroviaria Italiana; Centostazioni
- Lines: Viareggio–Florence; Pisa–Lucca; Lucca–Aulla
- Distance: 43.750 km (27.185 mi) from Firenze Santa Maria Novella
- Platforms: 5
- Tracks: 9
- Train operators: Trenitalia
- Bus operators: Autolinee Toscane
- Connections: Urban and suburban buses

Construction
- Structure type: At-grade
- Parking: Paid car parking Bike parking
- Architect: Vincenzo Pardini

Other information
- Status: Staffed
- Classification: Gold

History
- Opened: 29 September 1846; 179 years ago

Services
Bar, Ticket office, Ticket machines, Snack and beverage machine, Railway Police, Toilets, Waiting room,
Location

Lucca railway station (Italian: Stazione di Lucca) is the main station serving Lucca, Tuscany. It lies on the Viareggio–Florence line and functions as both a through station and a terminus for regional trains from Florence, Viareggio, Pisa, Livorno, and Aulla.

The station is served only by Trenitalia regional trains, covering local routes in Tuscany and nearby areas.

While important, Lucca is not the busiest hub in the province, Viareggio holds that role. The former freight yard was moved to Frizzone, between Capannori and Porcari.

The infrastructure is managed by Rete Ferroviaria Italiana (RFI), and commercial areas by Centostazioni.

== History ==
The passenger building was designed in the early 19th century by German engineer Enrico Pohlmeyer, who created the station's layout, and local architect Giuseppe Pardini, responsible for the architectural elevations. The building was officially inaugurated on 29 September 1846. The façade features a double row of arches and, despite modifications over time, retains much of its original 19th-century appearance.

Beginning in 1884, the station forecourt served as the terminus of the Lucca–Ponte a Moriano tramway, whose urban section passed beneath the city's walls via the tunnel known as the sortita Cairoli. This tram stop, near the Porta San Pietro, included a masonry building used by the tramway company, a central canopy, a water tank for steam locomotives, and a connecting track to the nearby freight yard—although not linked to the national rail network. The line ceased operations in 1932.

The Lucca–Monsummano tramway, a narrow-gauge electric line, also had a stop near the station. It was inaugurated in 1907 and operated until 1957.

From 1928 to 1944, Lucca station served as the northern terminus of the Lucca–Pontedera railway, a standard-gauge line intended to link Lucca with the Valdera region. Passenger service ended in 1944 due to wartime damage. The line was officially closed on 21 February 1958 and dismantled by October that year. A short segment remained in use for freight traffic to the San Donato industrial area until the early 2000s, before falling into disuse.

On 6 January 1944 at 13:06, the station and the San Concordio district were bombed by 22 Martin B-26 Marauder aircraft of the USAAF's 319th Bomber Group, launched from bases in Sardinia. The raid dropped 124 500-pound bombs, killing 24 civilians, injuring dozens, and severely damaging the Lenzi Mechanical Workshops, the passenger building, tracks, and freight facilities.

The station's freight yard was decommissioned in 2015 to ease truck traffic in the surrounding area. A new facility was inaugurated that same year in the Frizzone area, between the municipalities of Capannori and Porcari. In 2021, the city of Lucca acquired the former freight yard with plans to convert it into a regional bus terminal. As of 2025, the site remains in a degraded condition, pending redevelopment.

On 22 May 2023 work began on a new pedestrian and bicycle underpass designed to connect the city's historic walls with the station at Piazzale Ricasoli. The underpass was inaugurated on 14 May 2025.

Restoration works on the main station building began on 3 July 2023.

== Facilities and Infrastructure ==
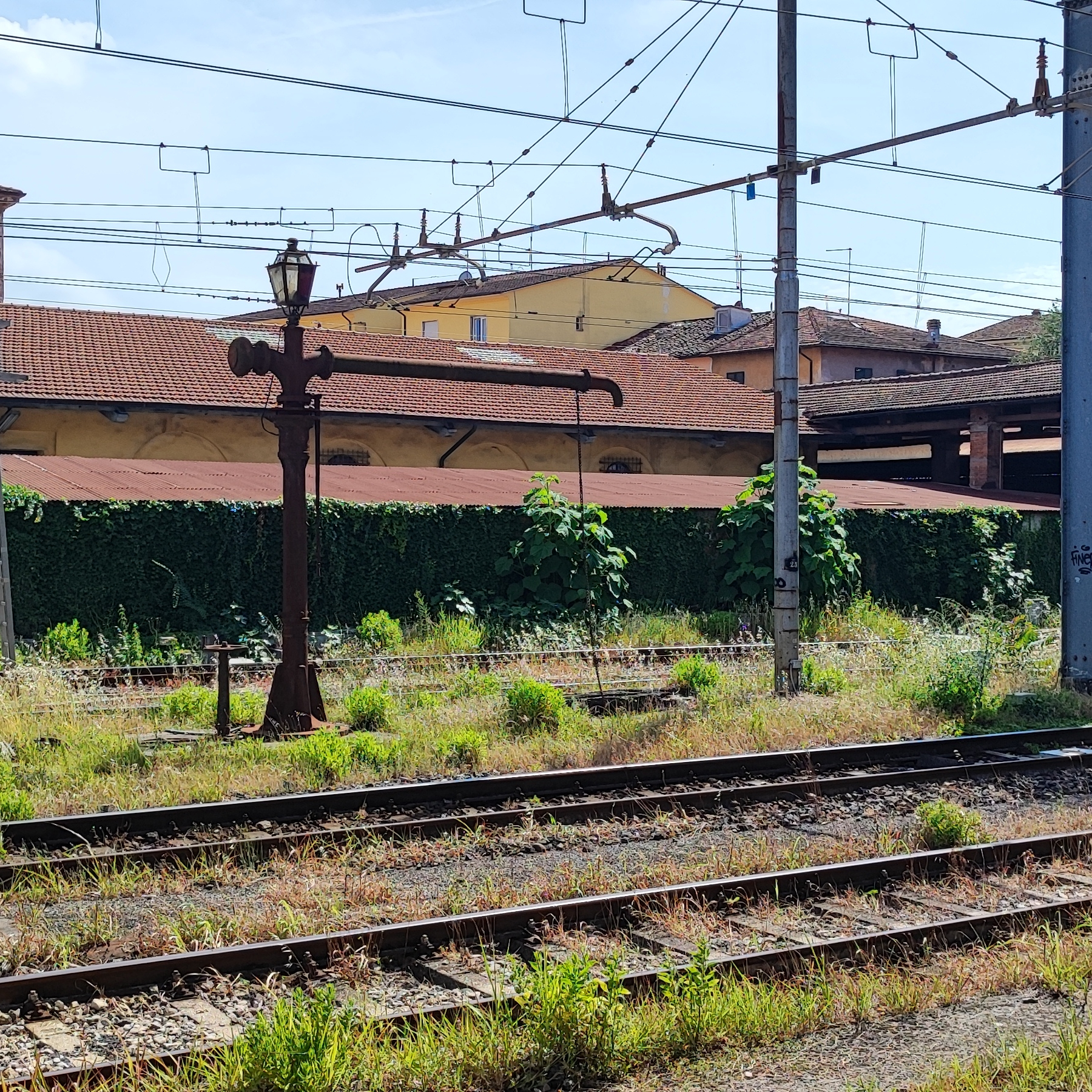
One of the two hydraulic columns between the third and fourth track.

Lucca station is equipped with nine tracks, used for regional passenger trains and, occasionally, for the transit and stabling of freight trains.

- 1: trains to or from Pisa, Media Valle del Serchio, Garfagnana, and Lunigiana.
- 2: used for stabling rolling stock.
- 3 and 4: serve the Viareggio-Florence and Pisa-Lucca lines, respectively; since they run parallel up to Montuolo, the tracks are often used in both directions.
- 5 and 6: through or terminating trains from Viareggio, Pisa, and Florence.
- Tracks 1 and 2 West: terminating or departing trains to/from Pisa, Viareggio, and Livorno.
- Track 1 East: terminating or departing trains to/from Florence, Garfagnana, and Lunigiana.

Between tracks 3 and 4 there are two hydraulic columns, located at the ends of the platform, used to supply water to steam locomotives.

== Passenger Traffic ==
Lucca station experiences steady passenger traffic throughout the day, with peaks in the early morning and late afternoon. During summer months, attendance significantly rises due to the increased number of tourists and travelers heading to Viareggio, a popular seaside destination and the main railway hub in the province.

All regional trains operated by Trenitalia that pass through the station stops here, providing direct connections to key destinations such as Florence, Aulla, Viareggio, and Pisa. There is one daily train to Livorno, while the connection to Pisa Airport is covered by frequent buses departing from the stop outside the station.

According to the latest estimates from 2023, Lucca station handles between 5,000 and 10,000 passengers daily, totaling approximately 1.8 to 3.6 million travelers annually.

== Services ==
Access to the underpass is provided via fixed stairs, ramps, and elevators, all equipped with side guides to facilitate bicycle transport.

The station offers the following services:

- Staffed ticket office
- Ticket vending machines
- Waiting room
- Restrooms
- Railway Police
- First aid station
- Trenitalia information desk
- Café
- Vending machines (snacks and drinks)
- Newsstand and tobacco shop
- Paid parking
- Bicycle parking
- Underpass
- Elevators

== Interchanges ==
The square in front of the station is served by most urban and suburban lines operated by Autolinee Toscane, which regularly stop here. Only two lines have their terminus at the station, while some do not pass through this area.

Until 1932, the same square was the terminus of the Lucca–Ponte a Moriano tramway, which was discontinued that year.

Until 1957, the square also hosted a stop for the Lucca–Monsummano tramway, also discontinued in that year.

- Bus stop – "Stazione FS"
- Taxi stand

== Bibliography ==
- Rete Ferroviaria Italiana. Fascicolo Linea 94. Edition 2003, updated 12 March 2025. Official source
- Ferrovie dello Stato Italiane. History of Railways in Tuscany. Rome, 2010.
- Comune di Lucca. Historical Archive of Railway Infrastructure. Lucca, 2005.
- Bianchi, Giuseppe. History of Railways in Tuscany.
- Mariani, Carlo. Italian Railway Lines: Vol. 2, Tuscany and Umbria.
- Rete Ferroviaria Italiana Archives (RFI).
- Rossi, Paolo. Lucca: History and Infrastructure.

== See also ==
- History of rail transport in Italy
- List of railway stations in Tuscany
- Rail transport in Italy
- Railway stations in Italy
