= Edificio Ex Hotel Mundial =

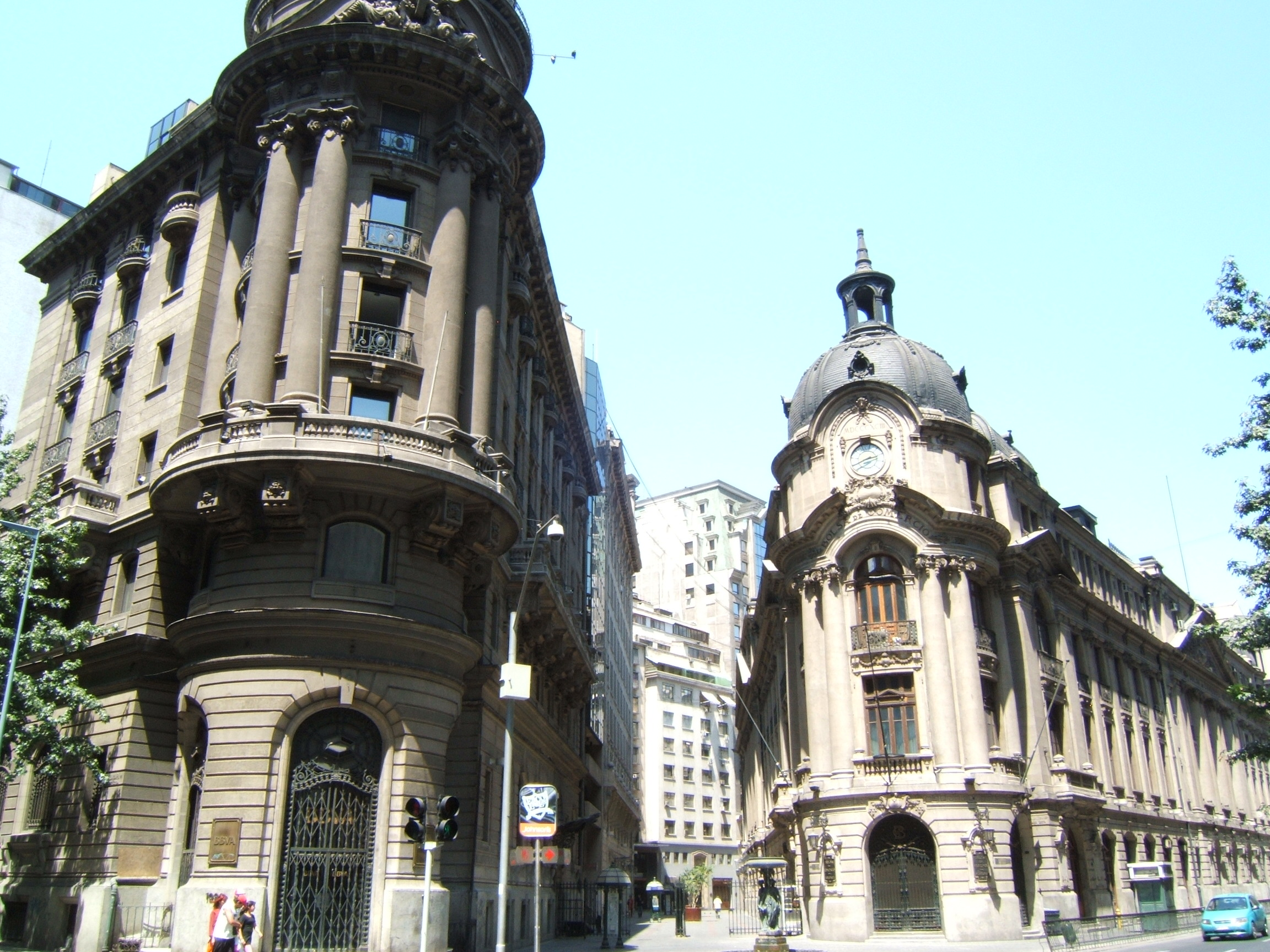
- The building (left) and the Santiago Stock Exchange Building (right).
- Interactive map of the Edificio Ex Hotel Mundial area

General information
- Location: Santiago, Chile
- Coordinates: 33°26′31.7″S 70°39′6″W
- Completed: 1923

The Edificio Ex Hotel Mundial is a former hotel building in Santiago, Chile. Located on a triangular lot, the building was commissioned by La Mundial Insurance Company and built in 1920–1923. In 1935, the building was offered for rental and operated as a hotel until 1975. It is close to the Iglesia de las Agustinas.

The building shares a similar architectural style with the building housing the Santiago Stock Exchange and the Club de la Unión, all of which are located in the same area as the Edificio Ariztía, which is bordered by the Paseo Ahumada to the east and the Alameda Avenue to the south. The main corner of the building features a cylindrical structure, which is adorned with pilasters and topped with a cupola.
