= Casa matriz del Banco de Chile =

Building in downtown Santiago, Chile

Coordinates: 33.4402°S 70.6505°W

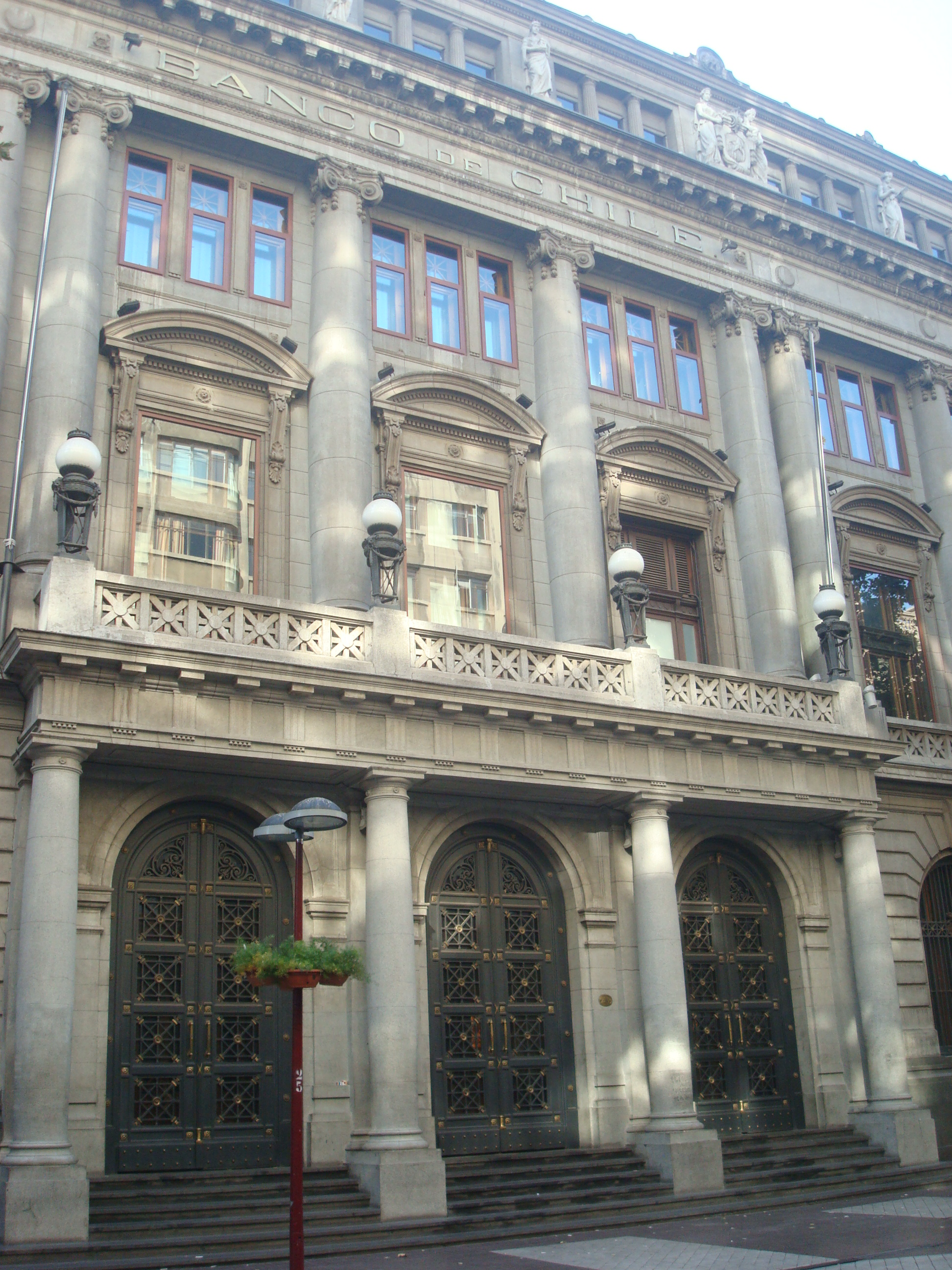
- Interactive map of the Casa matriz del Banco de Chile area

Design and construction
- Architect: Alberto Siegel

The Casa Matriz del Banco de Chile is a building in downtown Santiago, Chile, which houses the headquarters of the Banco de Chile. It is located at 251 Paseo Ahumada street, between Huérfanos y Agustinas streets. The building was declared as a National Monument of Chile in 2016, within the category of Historic Monuments.

== History ==
The Banco de Valparaíso, the Banco Nacional de Chile and the Banco Agrícola were merged in 1893 under the name of Banco de Chile. Its original headquarters in Santiago was located on Huérfanos Street, on land originally owned by the Arzobispado de Santiago.

In 1909, the architects Alberto Cruz Montt and Ricardo Larraín Bravo were commissioned to make a preliminary design of the facade of the new building, and in 1919 an open competition was launched by the bank for its construction, which was won by Austrian Alberto Siegel.

The construction of the building began in 1921 and was inaugurated on April 6, 1926. The building, an example of the Beaux-Arts architecture style, features a large central hall and well-designed circulation spaces. It is known for being the first structural metal framed building in Chile to be plastered with concrete. The previous metal buildings in the country were featured for having architecturally exposed metal structures.

The building features four above-ground stories and two basement levels housing an exhibition room. The first floor is 1.6 m higher than the street level, and on the main facade: doors and windows of the first floor are topped by semi-circular arches, the second floor features curve-pedimented windows and the third and fourth floors feature plain rectangular windows. Columns of classical order give the building its monumental character. The decorative ironwork details of the building were manufactured by "Mina Hnos. Ltda.", a company which also manufactured ironwork for the Club de la Unión, the Palacio Ariztía and the building housing the Banco Central.
