= Edificio Crillón (Santiago de Chile) =

Building in Santiago de Chile

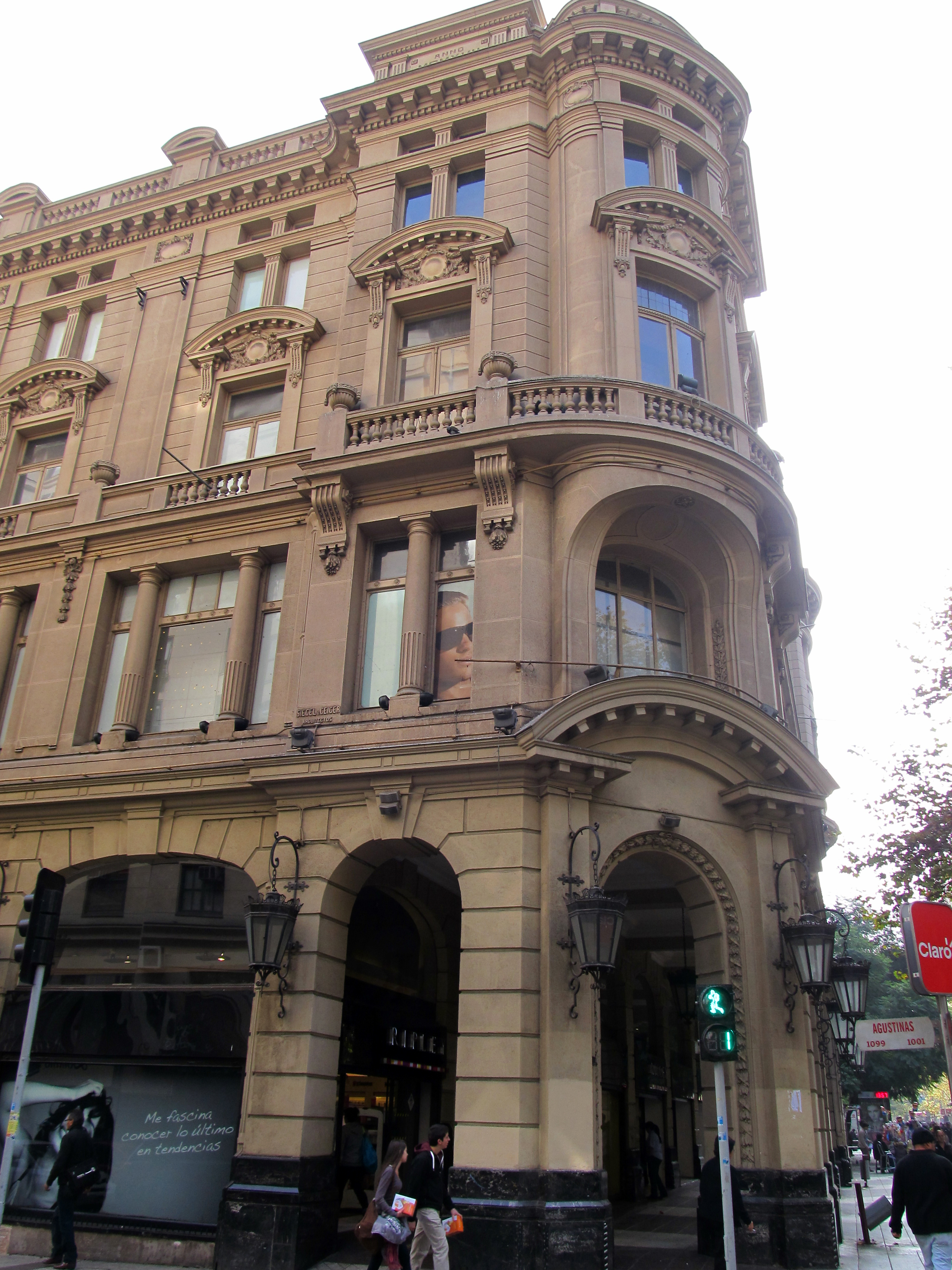
- Interactive map of the Edificio Crillón area

General information
- Location: Santiago de Chile, 1035 Agustinas Street

Design and construction
- Architects: Alberto Siegel and Augusto Geiger

The Edificio Crillón, also known as Edificio Larraín, is a building in Santiago de Chile, at 1035 Agustinas Street, between Bandera and Ahumada streets. The building, formerly known as Hotel Crillón, was a hotel and is a shopping gallery named Galería Crillón. The portion of the building formerly occupied by the hotel is currently occupied by a department store. It was declared as an Historic Preservation Building.

== History ==
The building was designed by Austrian architect Alberto Siegel, and architect of Swiss descent Augusto Geiger, and built between 1917 and 1919. It was originally built as the home for the Larraín García Moreno family.

The building was converted to a shopping arcade in 1925 and to a hotel, originally named Hotel Savoy, and then renamed Hotel Crillón. During the 1930s, it was an important site for social meetings. Notable guests stayed at the hotel including globally known actors such as Gary Cooper and Clark Gable.

Two crimes of passion perpetrated by female writers occurred at the Crillón Hotel; the first took place on 27 January 1941, when María Luisa Bombal shot her lover three times, who survived the shots and did not take legal actions against Bombal. The second incident occurred in April 1955, when the writer María Carolina Geel shot her partner five times to death.

Since the hotel was closed in February 1978, the main volume of the building has been occupied for commercial purposes. A branch of Ripley department store was housed in the building in 2005, after the renovations by architect [[Miguel Molinari]], who preserved the facade, the marble stairways, elevators and lanterns of the interior of the building.

== Cultural references ==
- The novel La chica del Crillón (The girl from the Crillón (hotel)) by Joaquín Edwards Bello was published in 1935. The novel was adapted into the 1941 movie La chica del Crillón with screenplay by Jorge Délano Frederick.
- The cookbook Famosas recetas (Famous Recipes) by Hotel Crillón was published in 1951, which included the extensive menu of French cuisine offered by its restaurant —like the «crema Crillón»— and the cocktails that were served at its bar.

== Gallery ==
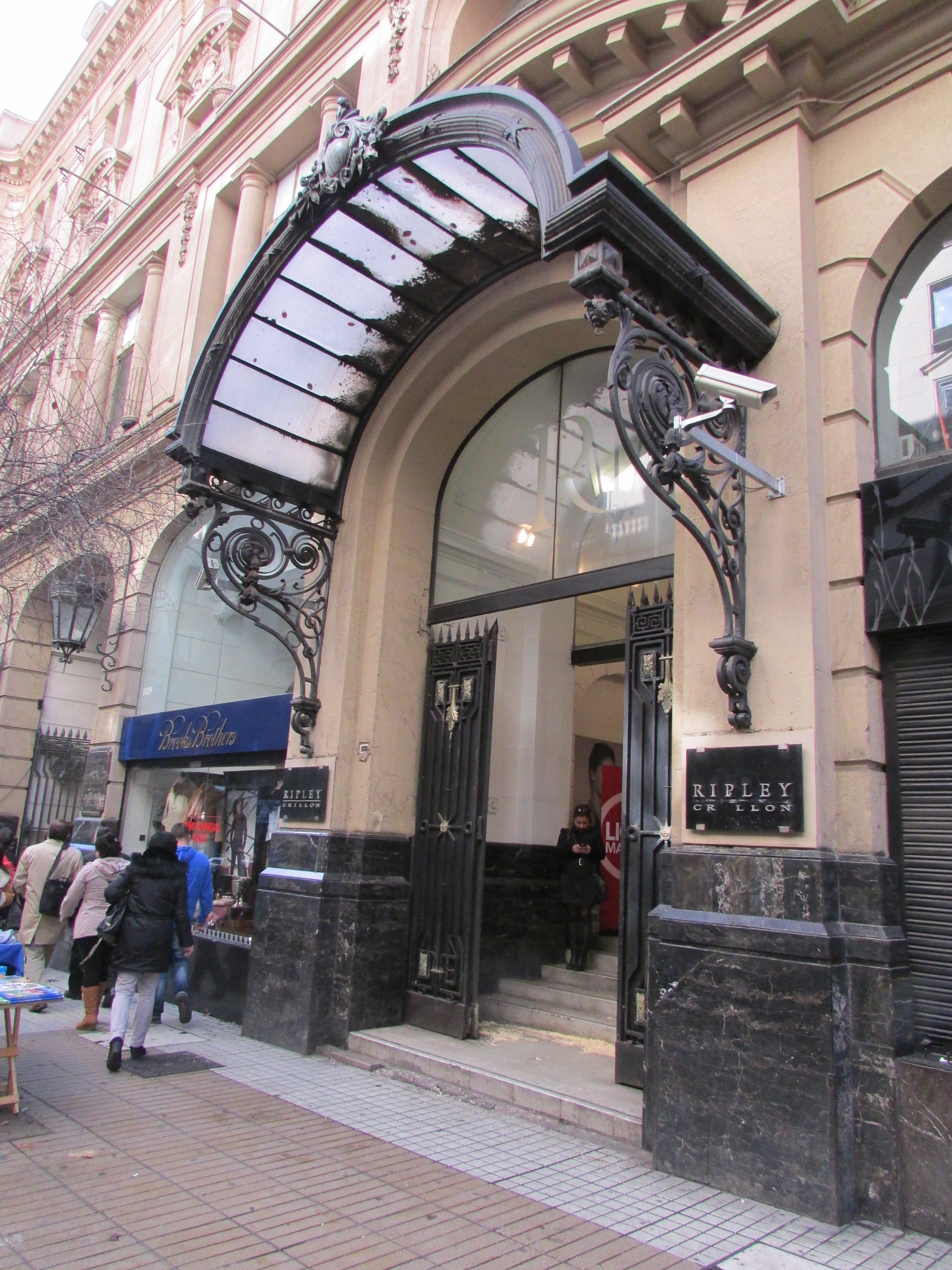
Main entrance

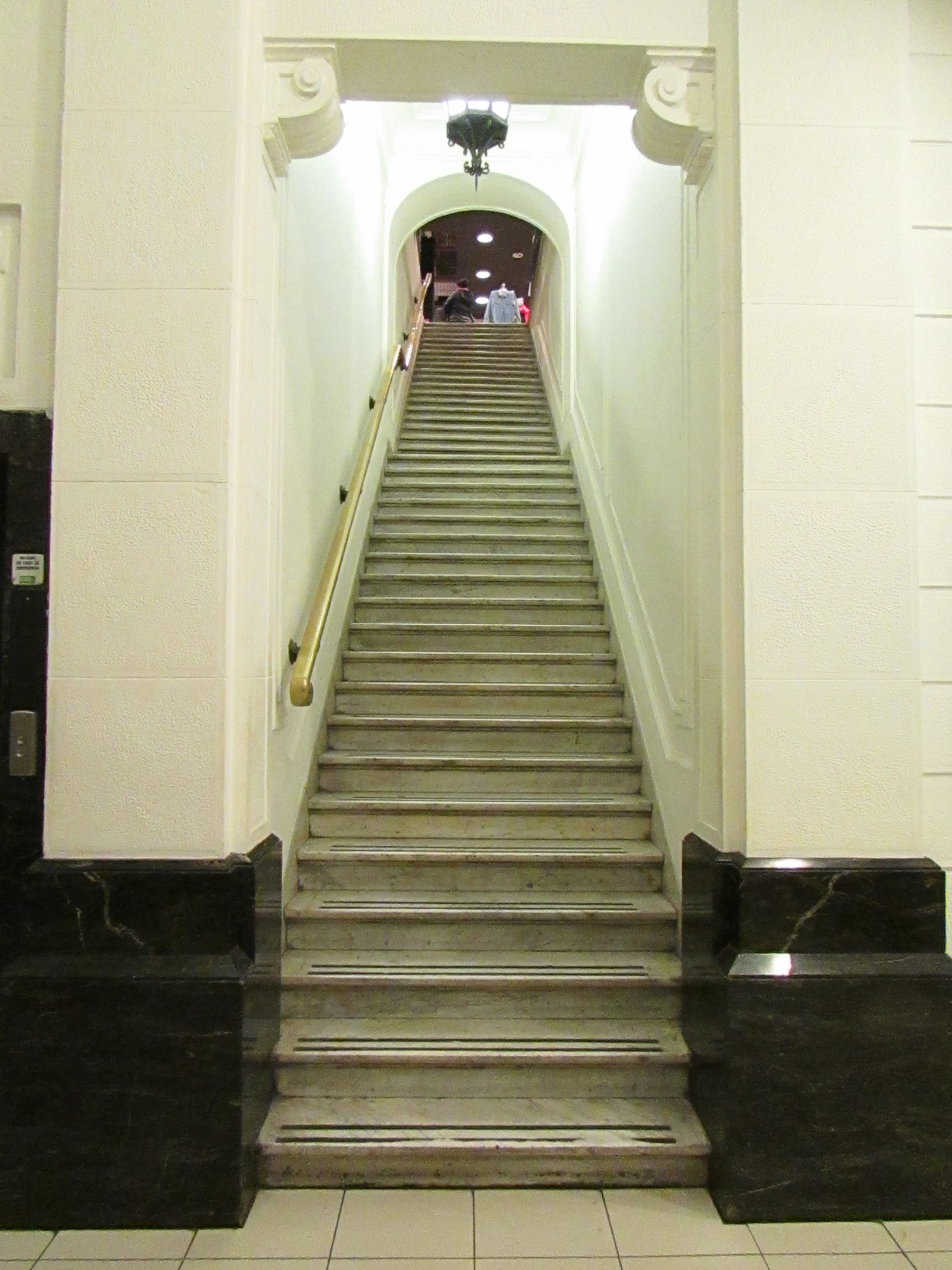
Interior stairway

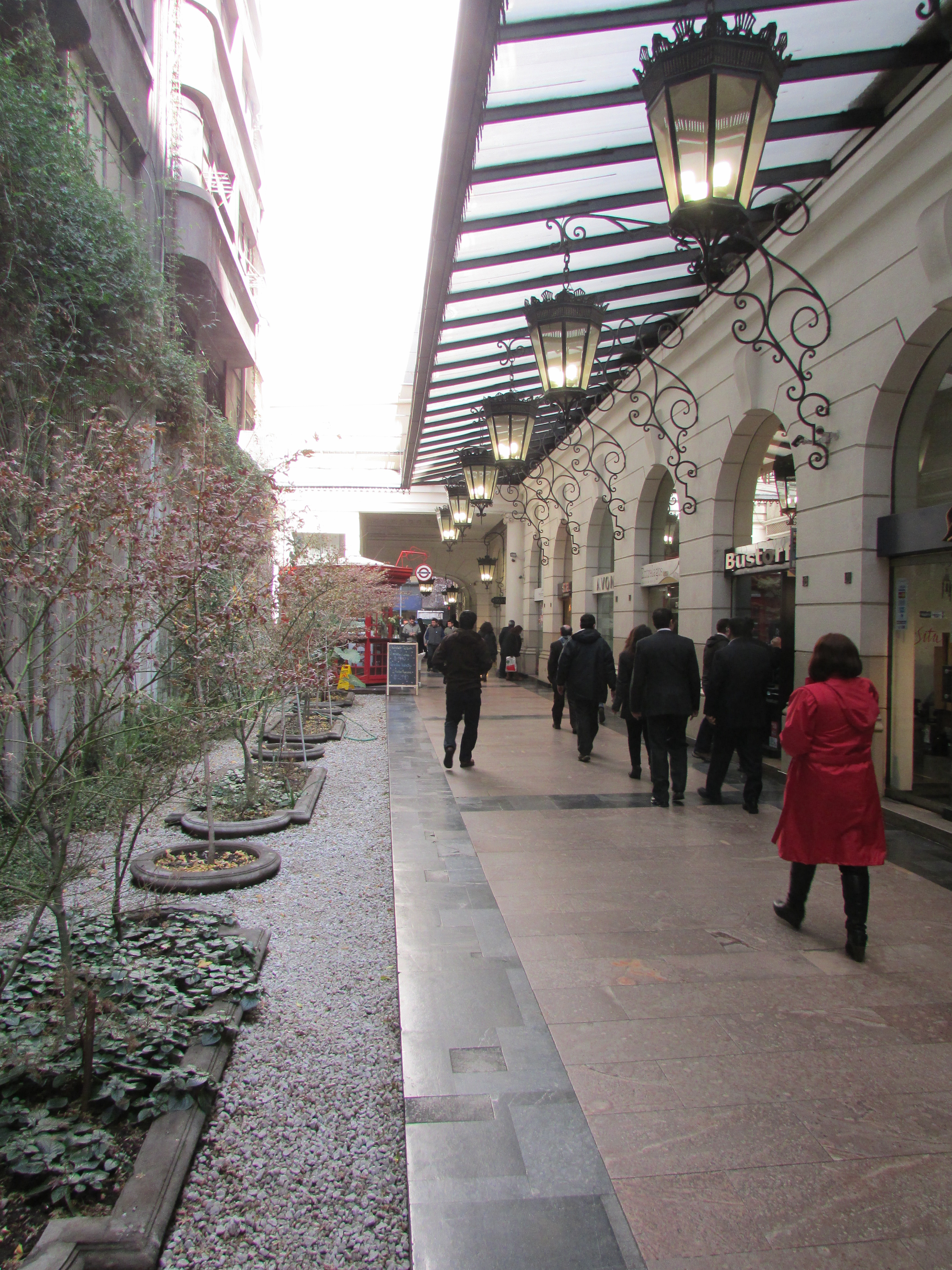
Shopping arcade
