= Passaglia =

Passaglia is a surname and may refer to the following people:

- Carlo Passaglia (1812–1887), Italian Jesuit
- Augusto Passaglia (born 1838), Italian sculptor
- Marty Passaglia (born 1919), American basketball player
- Lui Passaglia (born 1954), Canadian football player
- Juan Pablo Passaglia (born 1989), Argentine football player
