= Lucca–Ponte a Moriano tramway =

Closed tramway in Tuscany, Italy

Lucca–Ponte a Moriano Tramway
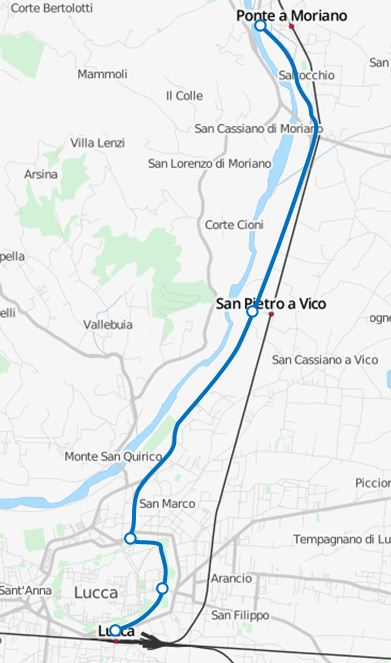

Overview
- Native name: Italian: Tranvia Lucca-Ponte a Moriano
- Locale: Province of Lucca, Italy
- Transit type: Tram
- Number of lines: 1
- Number of stations: 11

Operation
- Began operation: 1883
- Ended operation: 1932
- Operators: Tranvia Lucchese (TL) (1883-1924); Consorzio Trasporti Secondari (1924-1931); Lazzi e Govigli (1931-1932)

Technical
- System length: 10,645 km (6,614 mi)

The Lucca–Ponte a Moriano Tramway (Italian: Tranvia Lucca-Ponte a Moriano) was an urban steam tramway line that connected Lucca railway station with a renowned jute factory in Ponte a Moriano. The line was closed in 1932 and ran almost parallel to the Lucca–Aulla railway.

== History ==
Ponte Moriano is a frazione of Lucca located 6 miles (9.7 km) north of Lucca, and at the time was an area known for the manufacture of jute goods in factories powered by the river Serchio. The project of the short tramway was born on the initiative of the Genoese entrepreneur Emanuele Balestreri, owner of the Ponte a Moriano jute factory.

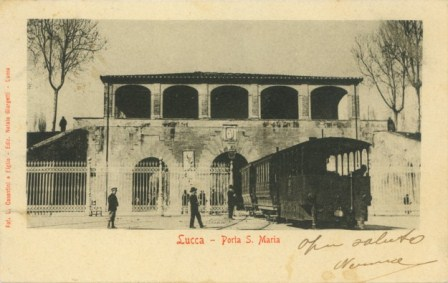
Tram at Porta Santa Maria in Lucca, in a vintage postcard of the early twentieth century

The Lucca–Ponte a Moriano line was inaugurated in 1883, with the initial southern terminus located outside the city walls at Porta Santa Maria. In June 1884 the line was extended closer to the existing Lucca railway station, despite resistance from some who opposed the opening of a passage for the tram through the ancient walls of Lucca. Trams were routed through the city along via dei Borghi and via dei Bacchettoni before exiting the city walls via a specially constructed short tunnel subsequently called sortita Cairoli, until reaching the new terminus station of Porta San Pietro located in the square in front of the railway station.

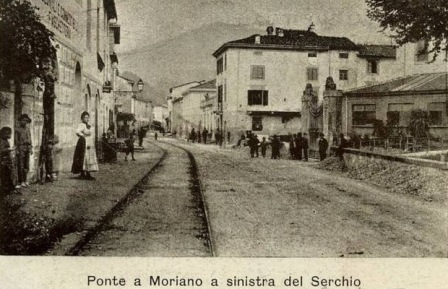
Ponte a Moriano, tramway tracks in the centre of the town (vintage card).

The northern terminus station of the tramway was located in Ponte a Moriano, with both a connection for the factory as well as a dedicated track connected to Ponte a Moriano railway station which opened in February 1892.

Primary use of the line was the transport of goods and workers to Balestreri's factory, whose ownership controlled the tram operating company which was named "Tranvia Lucchese". By 1899 the factory was known as Società Emanuele Balestreri & C. and was put into liquidation due to technical and economic problems. Balestreri died a few months later and in 1900 the company Manifattura Italiana di Juta was established in Genoa, which took over the site in Ponte a Moriano including the operation of the tramway.

Owing to both the political atmosphere of the time and as well as changes to the legislative structure concerning the concessions of the railway facilities, the factory, no longer interested in the operation of the tramway ceded ownership of the same to the Consorzio Trasporti Pubblici (CTS), based in Rome, on 1 January 1924. On 19 May 1931 the CTS sold the line to a local industrialist Luigi Barsotti who entrusted its operation to the company Lazzi e Govigli di Pistoia which continued to operate services on the line until its abolishment on 30 June 1932.

== Rolling stock ==
Services on the line were initially operated by two two-axle tramway locomotives built in 1883 by Cerimedo & C. and named no. 1 India and no. 2 Victory. A third was added in 1884; no. 3 Adele and a fourth locomotive, no. 4 Lucca built by Henschel & Son in 1895, was acquired in used-condition by Manifattura Italiana Juta from the Società Anonima dei Tramways di Torino.

10 two-axle carriages were available for passenger services, to which was added an unspecified number of freight wagons.
