= Arturo Dresco =

Argentine sculptor

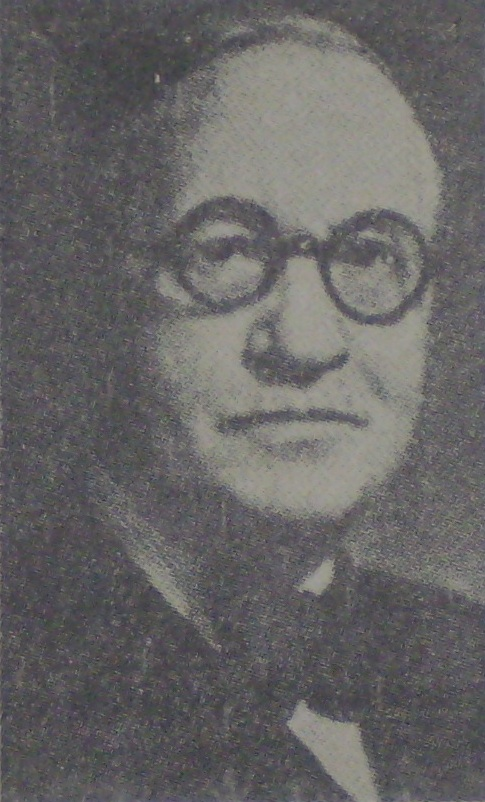
- Born: April 2, 1875; Buenos Aires, Argentina
- Died: July 21, 1961 (aged 86); Temperley, Argentina
- Known for: Sculpture, painting

Arturo Dresco (April 2, 1875 - July 21, 1961) was an Argentine sculptor.

He studied at the Sociedad Italiana Unione e Benevolenza and at the AEBA (Asociación Estímulo de Bellas Artes, Association Stimulus of Fine Arts). He moved to Florence in 1893 and studied under Augusto Passaglia until 1896.

In 1911, he was commissioned by the Argentina Centennial Commission to design the Monument to Spain, which was inaugurated in 1936.
