= Santiago Stock Exchange =

Chile's dominant stock exchange

- Bolsa de Comercio de Santiago

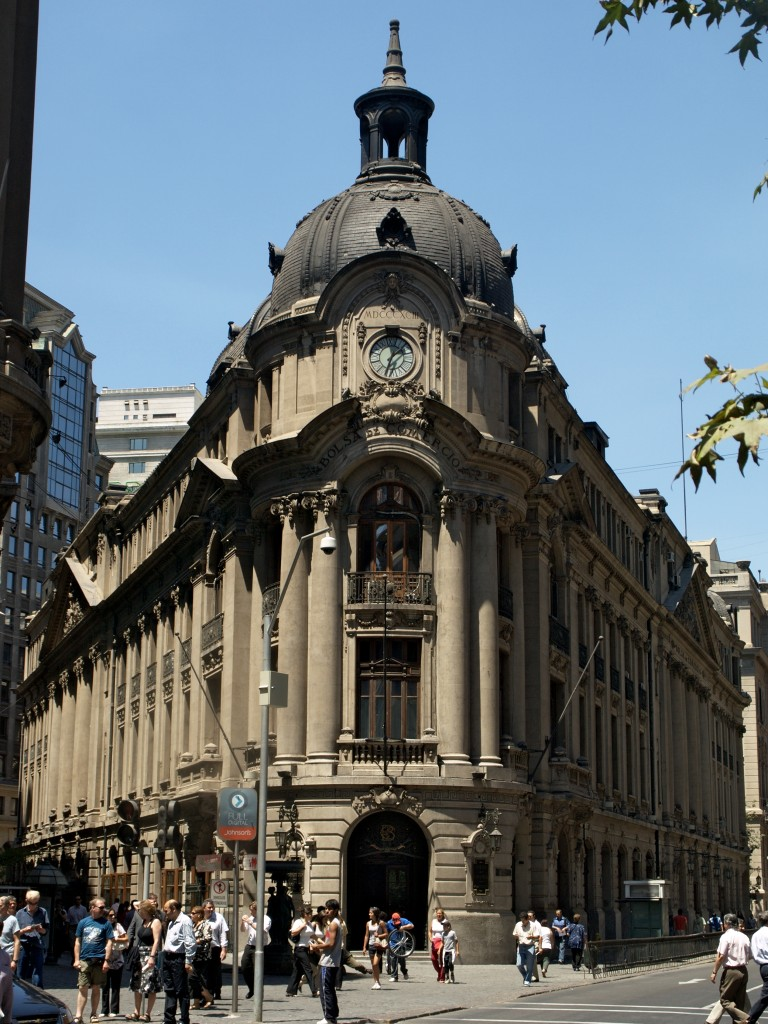
- Type: Stock exchange
- Location: Santiago, Chile
- Founded: November 27, 1893
- Owner: MILA
- Key people: José Antonio Martínez Zuggarramurdi (CEO); Pablo Yrarrázaval Valdés (Chairman)
- No. of listings: 268
- Market cap: US$ 269 billion (08/2013)
- Indices: IPSA
- Website: bolsadesantiago.com

The Santiago Stock Exchange (SSE; Spanish: Bolsa de Comercio de Santiago), founded on November 27, 1893, is Chile's dominant stock exchange, and the third largest stock exchange in Latin America, behind Brazil's BM&F Bovespa, and the Bolsa Mexicana de Valores in Mexico. On December 5, 2014, the Santiago Stock Exchange announced it was joining the United Nations Sustainable Stock Exchanges (SSE) initiative, becoming the 17th Partner Exchange of the initiative.

== Operations and indices ==
The exchange trades in stocks, bonds, investment funds, stock options, futures, gold and silver coins minted by the Banco Central de Chile, and US dollars on Telepregón, its electronic platform. The only floor trading conducted is the share market, concurrent with screen trading. Settlement for shares is T+2. The stock exchange works every day of the week, except weekends and financial holidays. The Board of Directors determines the schedule, and it generally is from 09:30 am to 04:00 pm in winter and 05:00 in summer.

=== Indices ===
Three Stock enhanced stock market indices are published.

The General Stock Price Index (Indice General de Precios de Acciones, or IGPA) is a market capitalization-weighted index that measures price variations of the majority of the exchange's listed stocks, classified by sectors according to its activity and revised annually. The index was developed with a base level of 100 as of December 30, 1980.

The Selective Stock Price Index (Indice de Precios Selectivo de Acciones, or IPSA) is composed of the 40 most heavily traded stocks and revised quarterly.

The Inter-10 Index is a volume weighted index of the 10 main Chilean stocks listed in foreign markets through ADRs; its stocks are selected from the IPSA and is revised quarterly. Futures are traded on the IPSA and the U.S. dollar.

== Building ==
Like the Club de la Unión, the Edificio Ariztía and the Edificio Ex Hotel Mundial, the building housing the stock exchange was built on land originally owned by the Augustinian nuns. The Iglesia de las Agustinas attests their former presence. The building was completed in 1917.

== See also ==
- Bolsa Electrónica de Chile (Santiago Electronic Stock Exchange)
- List of stock exchanges
- List of American stock exchanges
