= Calle Agustinas =

Historical street in Santiago, Chile

Calle Agustinas is a historical street in downtown Santiago. It stretches east from Avenida Matucana, which forms the boundary between Estación Central and Santiago, to the skirt of Santa Lucía Hill. Its length is 3.3 km. The street carries one-way traffic eastbound for its entire length and passes over the east branch of the Autopista Central.

== History ==
The street, which was created in 1576, is named after the Augustinian nuns, the first female religious order established in 1574 in Santiago. During the Conquest period, many widows of soldiers who died during the Arauco War lived in isolation in the convent. Its official name was given to it in 1576, which was Monasterio de la Limpia Concepción de Nuestra Virgen María. The monastery was bordered by the streets Agustinas on the north, Alameda on the south, Bandera on the west and Ahumada on the east.

The religious order was originally created to provide refuge for helpless women, however, during the 18th century, the nuns increased their wealth, which allowed to extend the aid to minor girls. In 1852, the nuns move to the site of the present-day Iglesia de las Agustinas, caused by the sale of the north city block that was property of the congregation. In 1912 the nuns moved their cloister to 420 Vicuña Mackenna Avenue.

Purportedly, between 1852 and 1855, the nuns built a tunnel to go from a monastery to the other without having break the vows, from the first church to that located at 1054 Moneda Street.

=== Notable residents ===
The street was once home to notable people in the history of Chile. (Old house numbering system)

- Fernando Márquez de la Plata (56 Agustinas Street)
- Ignacio de la Carrera (46 Agustinas Street), father of Javiera, Juan José, José Miguel and Luis
- Manuel Rodríguez (27 Agustinas Street)
- Hipólito Villegas (60 Agustinas Street)
- Manuel Blanco Encalada (20 Agustinas Street)
- Joaquín Prieto (27 Agustinas Street)
- Manuel Antonio Tocornal (42 Agustinas Street)
- Manuel Vicuña Larraín (100 Agustinas Street), the first archbishop of Santiago
- Benjamín Vicuña Mackenna was born at the Carrera family house (46 Agustinas Street)

In the 1900s, the Club Santiago was created to serve as an alternative to the conservative Club de la Unión. It was housed at the corner of Ahumada and Agustinas streets. By 1910, the club was headed by Ramón Barros Luco, who at the end of that year, in December, was elected by consensus as president of Chile.

In November 2013 was opened an exit ramp to connect the southbound express lanes of Autopista Central with Agustinas Street to reduce traffic congestion. With this ramp, the average trip times, from Quilicura and Lampa to downtown Santiago, were reduced by about 30%.

== Description ==
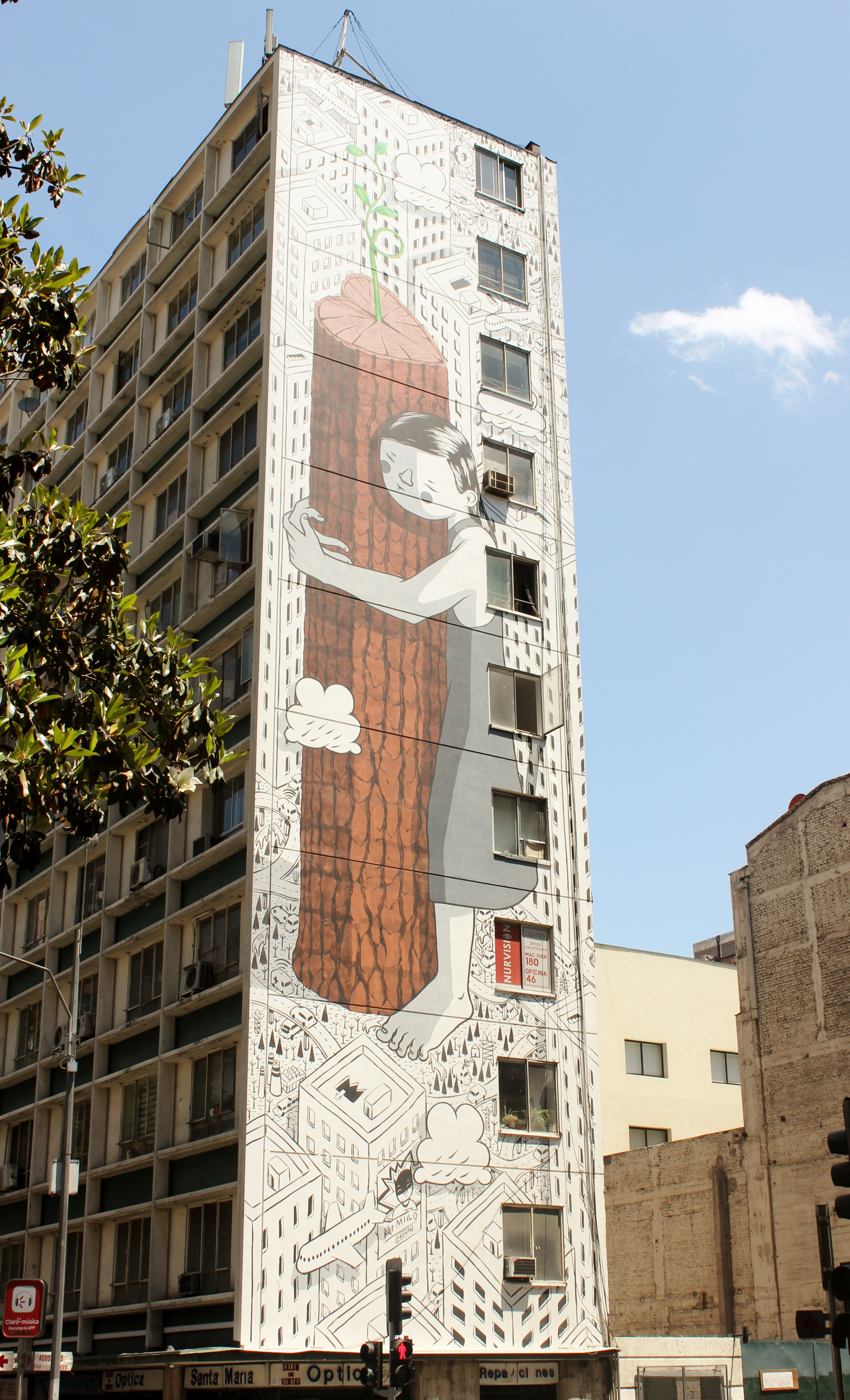
Mural by Millo at the corner of Agustinas and Mac-Iver streets

Extending eastward from the corner of San Antonio and Agustinas streets is the Plazoleta Patricio Mekis, a small square that includes the Fuente de los niños by sculptor Arturo Dresco and a statue of Patricio Mekis —known for his achievements as mayor of Santiago— by Galvarino Ponce. The plazoleta was declared as Monumento Histórico in 1973 including: the fountain, the walls, the gates and the kiosk. It is also included the Palacio Subercaseaux, a set of three adjacent properties built for the saltpeter businessman Francisco Subercaseaux Vicuña. Presently, the palace is home to the Club de la Fuerza Aérea.

The small square was formerly known as Teatro Municipal Square. In 1979, it was renamed as Patricio Mekis, who died that same year after a balcony of his summer house collapsed. The purpose of its creation was to provide better views of the main theatre facade, in order to not be overshadowed by other buildings. In 2010, the theatre was closed for five months due to the damage caused by the 2010 Chile earthquake. The theatre was reopened on 4 August 2010.

Between Teatinos and Morandé streets, on the south side of Agustinas is the Plaza de la Constitución, which offers a clear view of the north facade of the Palacio de La Moneda. The square features statues of four former presidents of Chile —Pedro Aguirre Cerda, Jorge Alessandri, Eduardo Frei Montalva and Salvador Allende. The square also contains a statue of Diego Portales by sculptor Jean-Joseph Perraud.

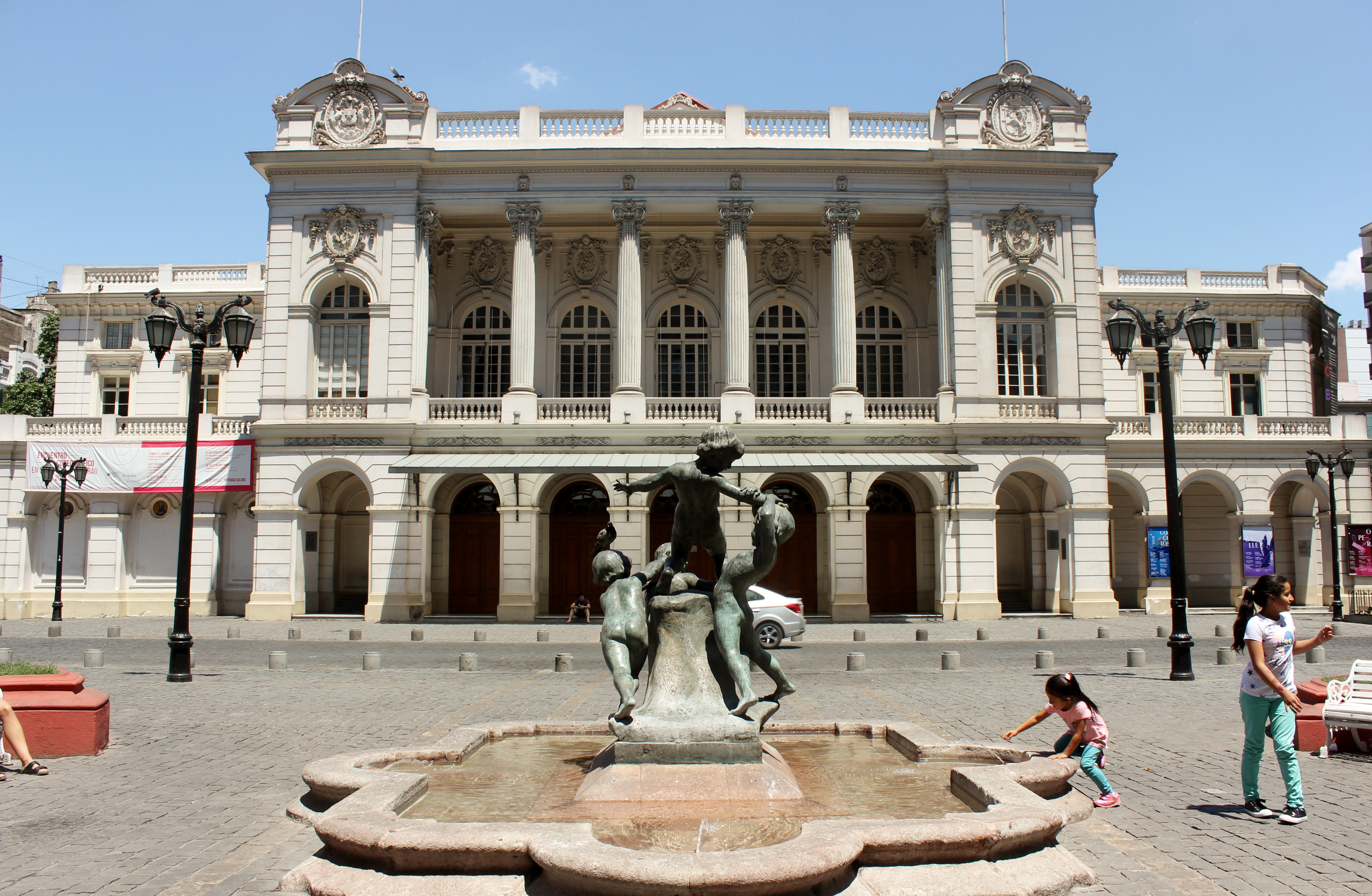
Fountain of Children and the Municipal Theatre

The western portion of Agustinas is characterized by mostly low-height buildings, being predominantly a mix of educational and residential area. High schools include Cervantes (2552 Agustinas Street) and Amunátegui (2818 Agustinas Street). The first residents in the area gave birth to the Barrio Yungay, which was the nightlife hub of the city in the early decades of the 20th century. The creation of the Quinta Normal, located immediately west of Matucana Avenue, marks the beginning of the urban expansion of the city between the mentioned avenue and Ricardo Cumming Avenue. The westernmost segment of Agustinas is separated from Portales Street by an eight-block-length park.
