= Walls of Lucca =

Defensive fortifications in Lucca, Italy

- Mura di Lucca
- Lucca, Italy
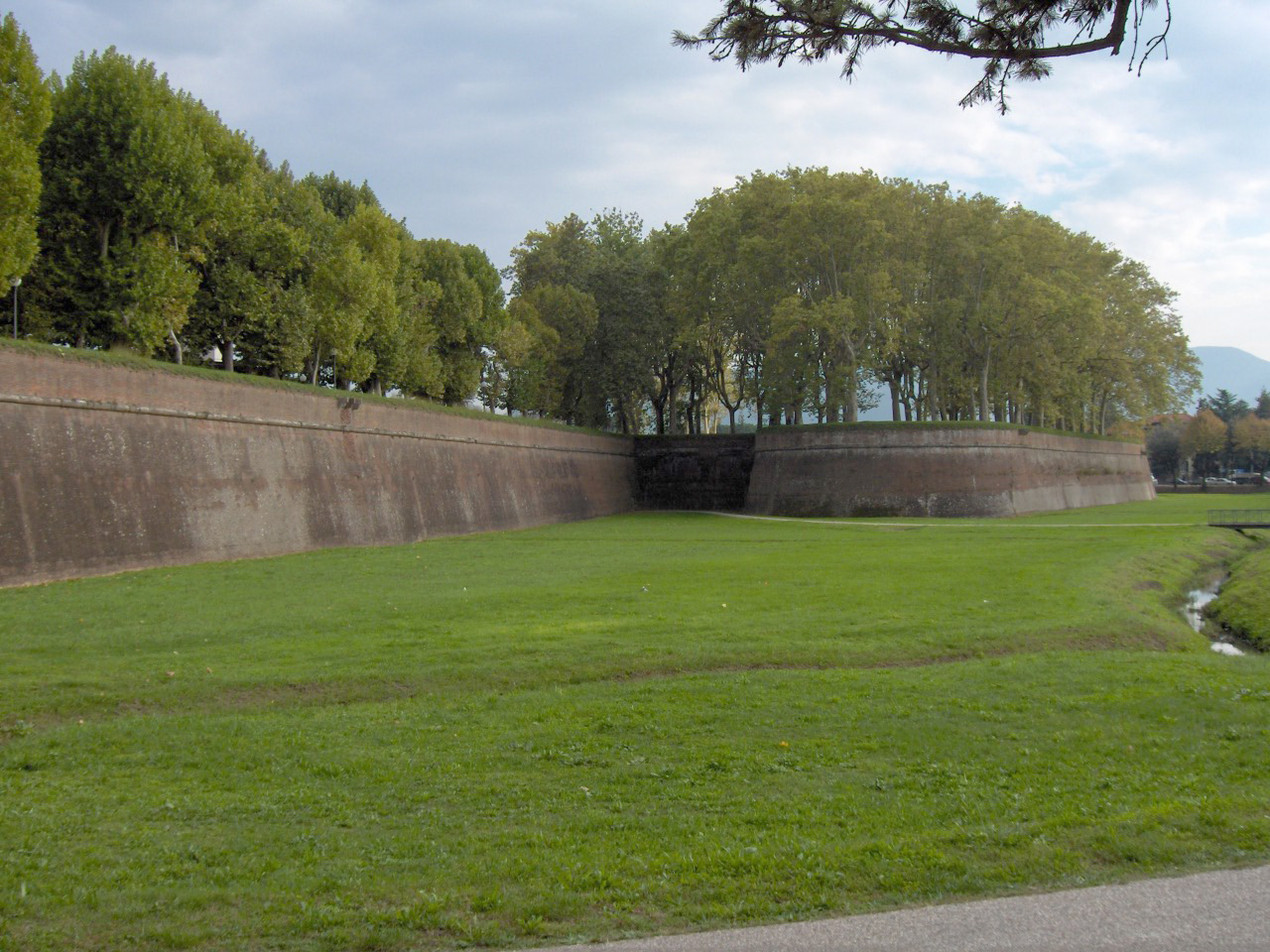
- External view of the walls of Lucca

Site information
- Type: City wall
- Open to the public: Yes
- Condition: Intact
- Engineers: Jacobo Seghezzi, Galeazzo Alghisi, Baldassarre Lanci, Alessandro Farnese

Location
- Coordinates: 43.8462233°N 10.5001148°E
- Height: 12 meters

Site history
- Built: 1504–1648
- Built by: Republic of Lucca
- Materials: stone, brick, earthwork
- Battles/wars: None
- Events: 1812 Flood of Serchio River

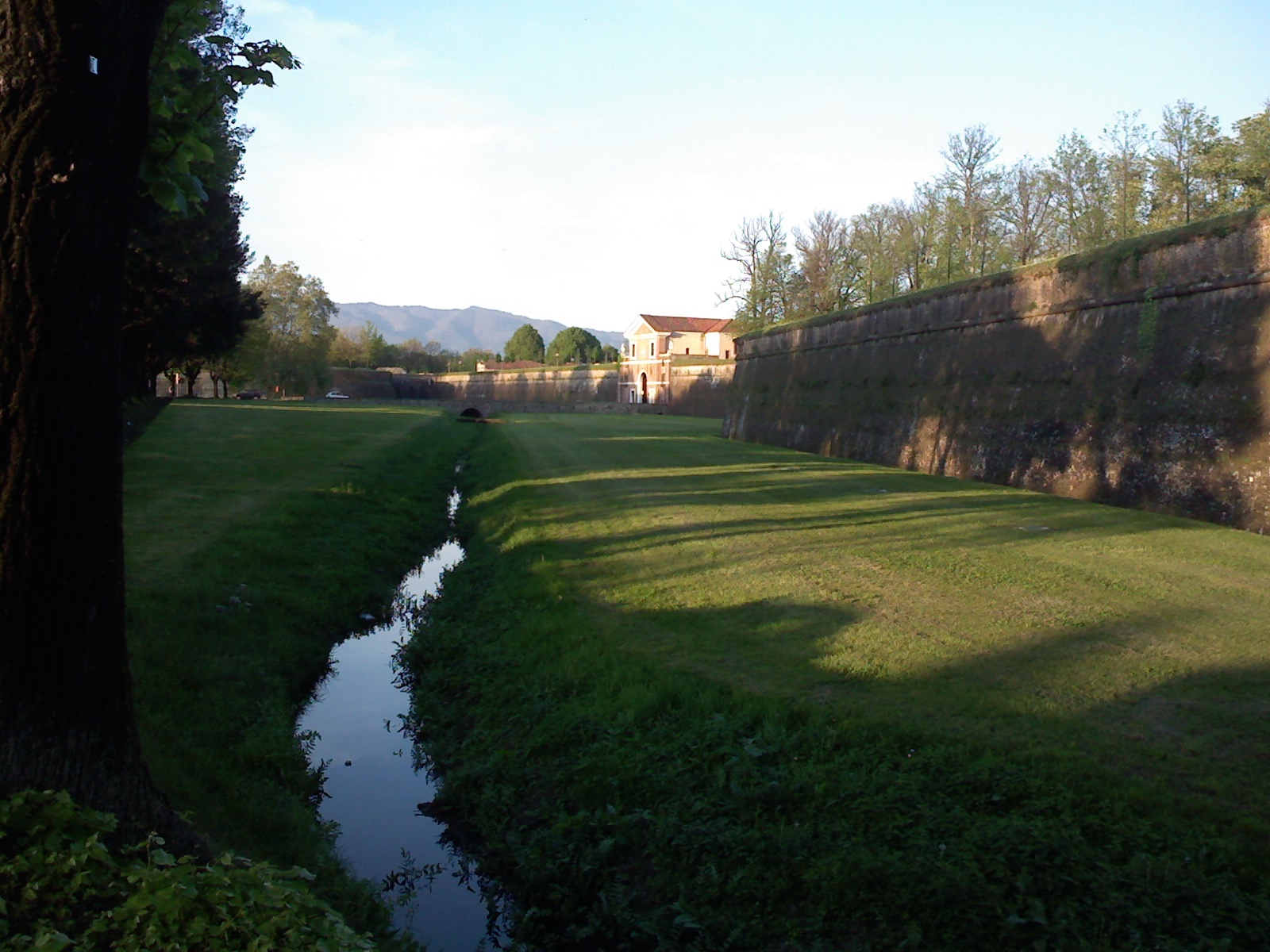
Moat external to the walls with a view of the San Donato Gate

The walls of Lucca are a series of stone, brick, and earthwork fortifications surrounding the central city of Lucca in Tuscany, Italy. They are among the best preserved Renaissance fortifications in Europe, and at 4 kilometers and 223 meters in circumference they are the second largest intact example of a fully walled Renaissance city after Nicosia, Cyprus. The current walls of Lucca, which replaced earlier medieval and Roman fortifications, are the result of a construction campaign that started on May 7, 1504, and ended a century and a half later in 1648, with additional structural updates in the second half of the seventeenth century based on new knowledge and construction techniques. These walls play an important role in the cultural identity of the city of Lucca and its surroundings, and as a physical monument to the region's history, and Lucca's longstanding independence as a republic.

The walls were also conceived as a deterrent and have never seen military use. At the time of construction, the Republic of Lucca feared the expansionist aims of the Republic of Florence and subsequently, the Grand Duchy of Tuscany. However, there was never an open war against the Grand Duchy. Although the Republic of Lucca did come into open conflict with the Duchy of Modena in the 16th and 17th centuries, these campaigns occurred exclusively in the Garfagnana, so the city of Lucca never underwent any siege and the walls were never used.

The only occasion in which the walls were put to the test was during the disastrous flood of the Serchio River on November 18, 1812. The doors were bolted and reinforced with mattresses, achieving a relative water tightness in the center of Lucca.

The structure was converted into a pedestrian promenade and public park in the 1820s under the rule of Maria Luisa de Borbón of Spain. The new use of the walls also affected the spaces outside the walls, which were converted from smaller fortifications into large lawns. This public use persists to the present day: the path above the walls remains heavily trafficked for recreation, and in the summer it also acts as a natural stage for shows and events. It is a major tourist attraction in the city of Lucca.

== The Roman and Medieval Walls ==
As in many other cities, the Renaissance walls that remain mostly intact today represent only the most recent fortified stage of Lucca. They replaced earlier medieval and Roman fortifications, modernizing and expanding the perimeter protected due to population growth and changing political and economic conditions.

=== The Roman Era ===
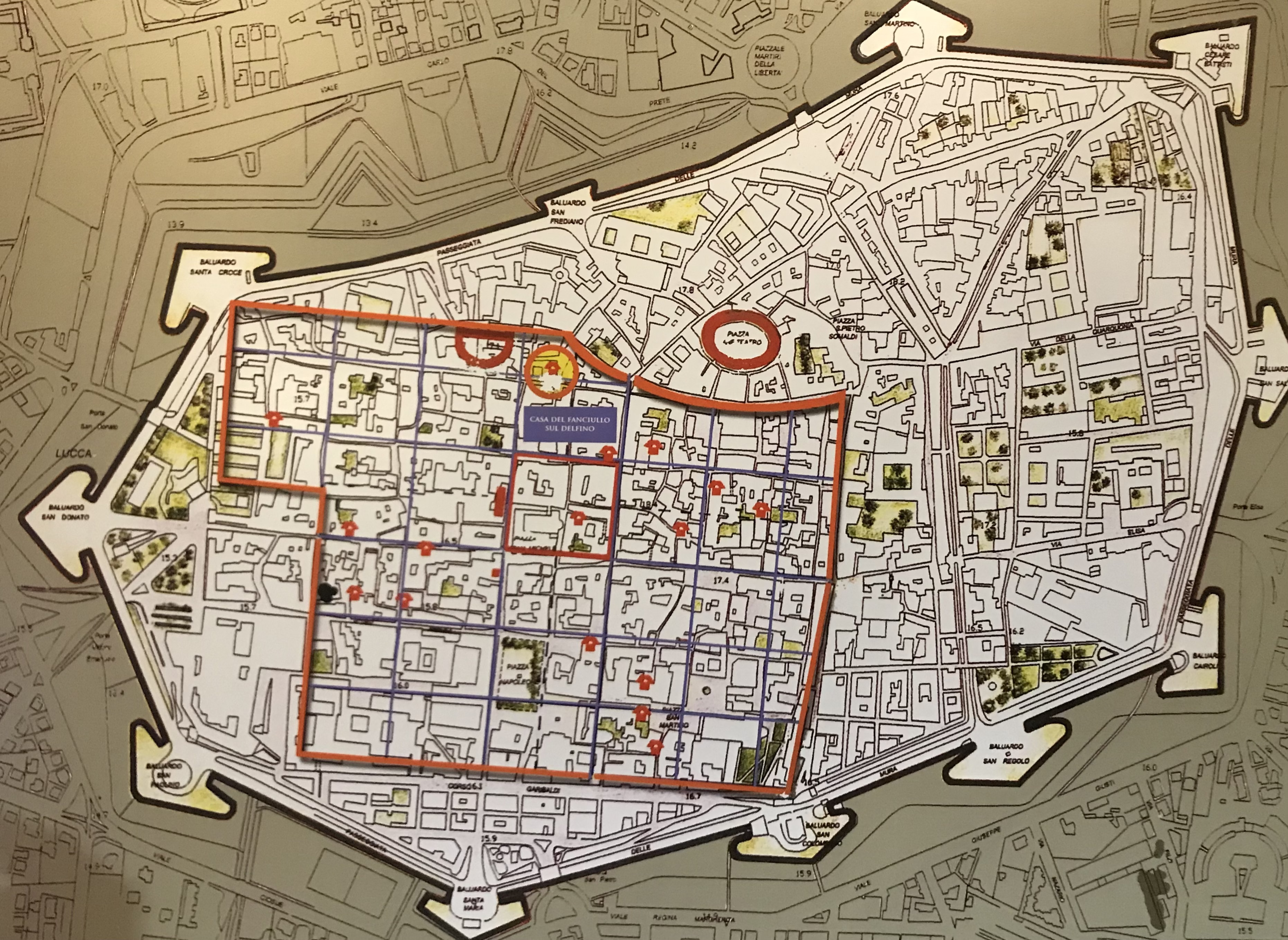
A map from Domus Romana Lucca showing Roman era structures including the walls, forum, amphitheater, and theater in comparison with modern-day fortifications.

The Roman fortified perimeter was erected as early as 180 BC when the Roman colonia of Luca was founded, and remains visible in the plan of the city streets today, with a northern boundary along Via San Giorgio, an eastern boundary along Via della Rosa and Via dell'Angelo Custode, a southern boundary along Corso Garibaldi, and a western boundary along Via Galli Tassi and Via della Cittadella.

Inside the walls, the typical Roman military castra is identifiable, with its orthogonal north–south cardus maximus and east–west decumanus maximus represented by modern-day Vias Veneto-Calderia-degli Asili and Vias San Paolino-Roma-Santa Croce respectively. These roads intersect at the ancient forum, which remains partly intact today as Piazza San Michele, dominated by the eponymous church of San Michele in Foro.

Short sections of the Roman era walls remain preserved today, incorporated into later structures, notably inside the church of Santa Maria della Rosa and in the basement of the Baluardo di San Colombano.

=== Medieval Era Walls ===
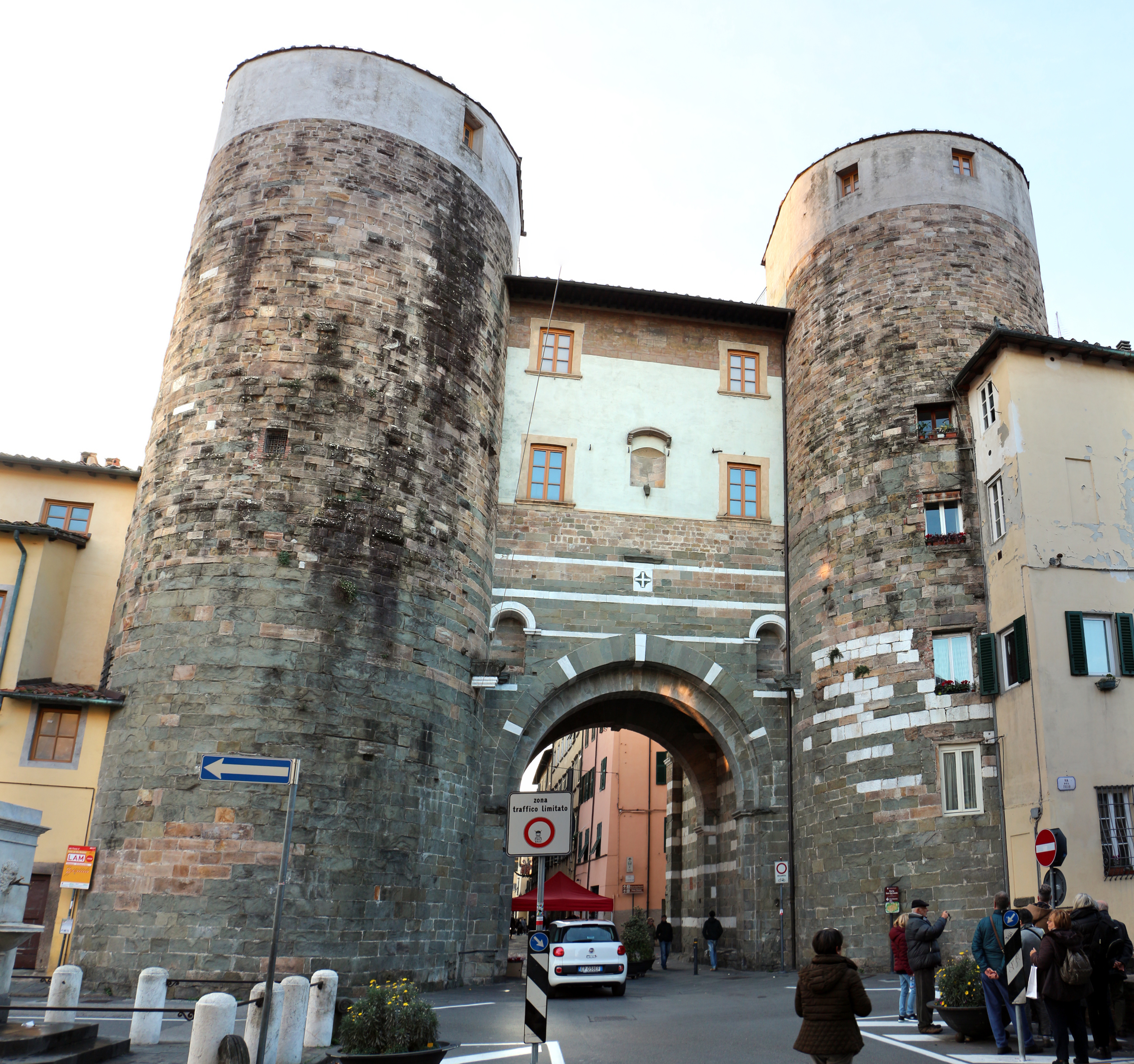
Porta San Gervasio, one of the eastern gates from the medieval era walls, still extant today but now wholly within the walled city due to the larger area encircled by the Renaissance walls.

During the eleventh or twelfth centuries, work began on a new set of walls. The towers were excavated and rebuilt and the embankments were equipped with moats functioning for both water control and defense. These walls expanded to include areas of the city that had grown since Roman settlement with the economic development of Lucca as a stop on the Via Francigena. During the same period Genoa and Pisa also invested in similarly built urban walls.

The medieval walls were about 2.45 meters thick, erected with a sack technique: a core of stones and pieces of waste embedded in mortar, layered between an outer aspect with a layer of carefully squared stone blocks, and an inner aspect made of a cheaper layer of bricks. On the outside the three lower courses were slightly protruding (about one centimeter each) for greater stability. Around twenty four semicircular turrets were also built with the same technique and therefore perfectly integral with the curtains and open towards the interior, characterized the appearance of the city, preserved in numerous pictorial representations. Portions of these medieval turrets were incorporated into the Renaissance earthworks and are therefore still visible today.

The medieval walls incorporated and updated a long stretch of the Roman era walls on the north side, but otherwise modified the rectangular shape of the Roman era to adapt to the interval development of the city. In particular, compared to the Roman walls, this medieval walled circle widened:

- northwards as far as Via dei Carrozzieri
- southwards to the current Porta San Pietro
- westwards to the current Piazzale Verdi
- eastwards to via San Nicolao

Today, Porta dei Borghi and Porta San Gervasio are the most important remnants of the medieval walls still extant.

=== The "Village Walls" ===
Despite the significantly increased area enclosed in the medieval walls, settlements soon developed to the northeast of the city outside the medieval walls. The development of the city was hindered in all other directions, to the south by the marshes and the proximity to the arch-rival Pisa, to the west by the presence of the Prato del Marquis, to the north by the ever threatening Serchio River, so the only medieval expansion of the city walls was seen in the northeast sector, where there were two additional gates built, San Gervasio and Portone dei Borghi, between which there were informally built fences and towers following the contours of the ground. Finally, at the beginning of the fifteenth century, an area formed of walls lower than the main city walls (about 7 meters high), mainly covered in bricks, was enclosed the village area.

== The Renaissance Walls ==
Starting in 1491, modernization of the city walls was deemed necessary in accordance with new techniques of warfare and fortification. In particular, the tall, thin medieval walls were effective for preventing infantry attacks, but were wholly inadequate to resisting cannon fire, which by that time had become a mainstay of siege warfare. Thus, much thicker walls would be necessary for the city to resist an artillery siege.

=== The Office of Fortifications ===
To coordinate the entire construction process of the modern walls, a specific body was created called "Office of the City and State Fortifications". Established on 7 May 1504 and dismissed three centuries later on 28 January 1801, the Office of Fortifications took care of the entire process of building the wall, and then the sole manager and maintainer. The documents of the Office of Fortifications retrace the construction of the walls day by day, also providing information on the debates of citizens, the construction difficulties encountered and the technical choices made. This body was made up of 6 members, appointed by election, but always chosen from among the group of the most influential families in the city.

=== The pre-construction phase ===
The process that led to the construction of the modern walls starts long before the actual construction work and is divided into multiple phases. The fortification campaign began in 1504, but implementation did not start until 1513. First of all, all the local villages were demolished, for a radius of about 1700 meters, so as to provide a wide view of the territory and make room for a broader wall. This process took many years, as there were ecclesiastical buildings and private territories, repaid at a later time following state estimates.

=== Design and implementation ===
For the design of the enclosure it is possible that consultations were requested from Matteo Civitali and Francesco di Giorgio Martini, but no evidence of actual projects remains. The real phase of construction began in the first half of the 16th century, with curtain wall segments flanked by large bastions allowing for reverse fire.

The construction of the current structure began with Jacobo Seghezzi in 1544, an architect who was soon joined by famous military engineers such as Galeazzo Alghisi and Baldassarre Lanci, who remained in Lucca's pay between 1547 and 1557, before moving on to the service of the Grand Duke of Tuscany. In 1561 the drawings by Francesco Paciotto da Urbino allowed to delineate the main nucleus of the fortifications. At the end of the century it was decided to request the work of Flemish engineers, whose school was the most prestigious at that time. In 1589 Alessandro Farnese was consulted, and he provided a plan that all subsequent engineers generally adhered to, up to Paolo Lipparelli who in the five-year period 1645–1650 completed the enormous construction.

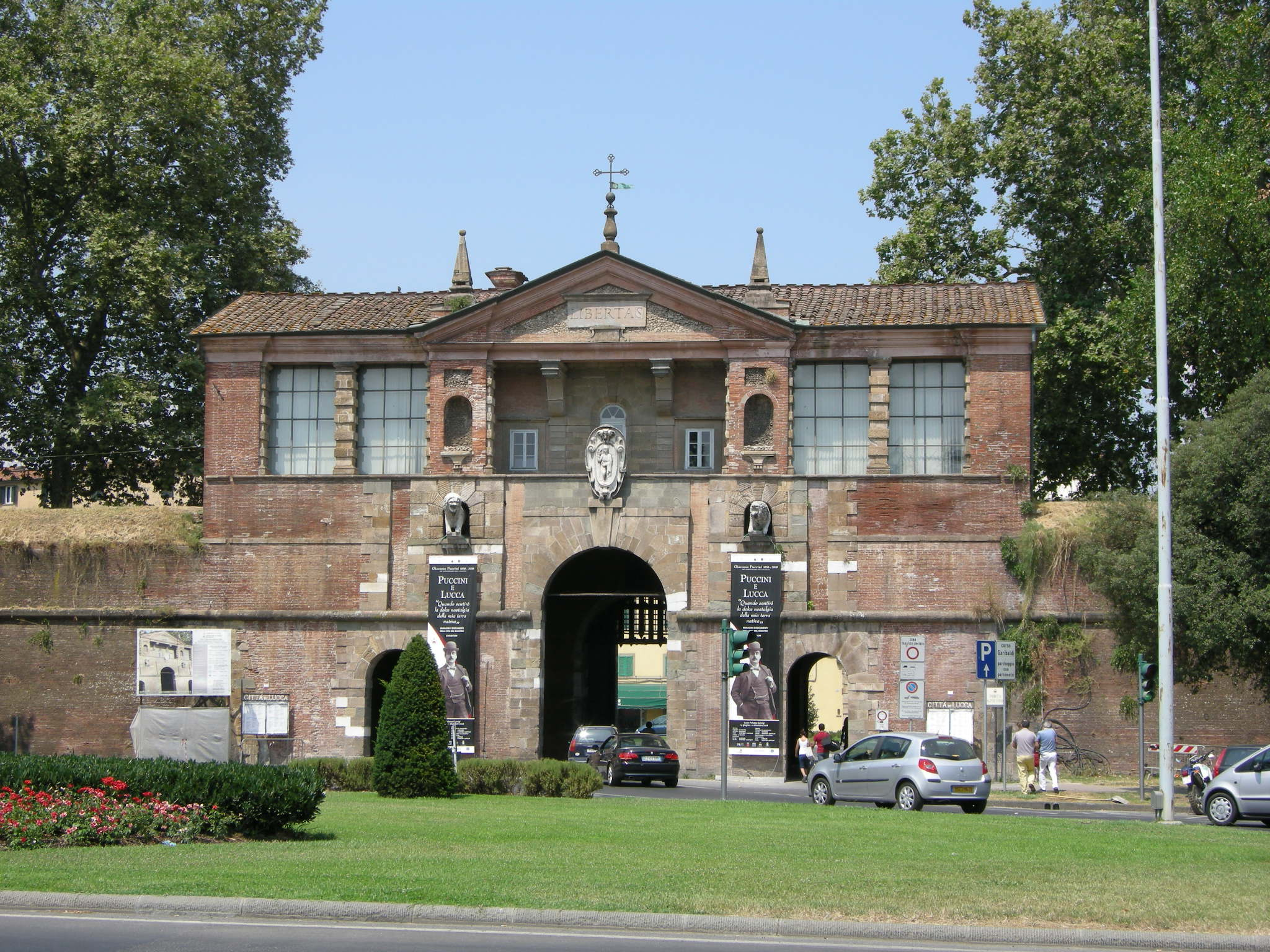
Porta San Pietro, one of three original Renaissance gates.

The walls were originally accessible through three major doors:

- Porta San Pietro
- Porta Santa Maria
- Porta San Donato

and a large number of posterns, which in reality were not doors but access points to allow the garrison to man the external works and carry out sorties. These openings were for the exclusive use of the garrison of the walls, who would open them only for sorties and counterattacks. Today they have largely been reopened for use as walkways.

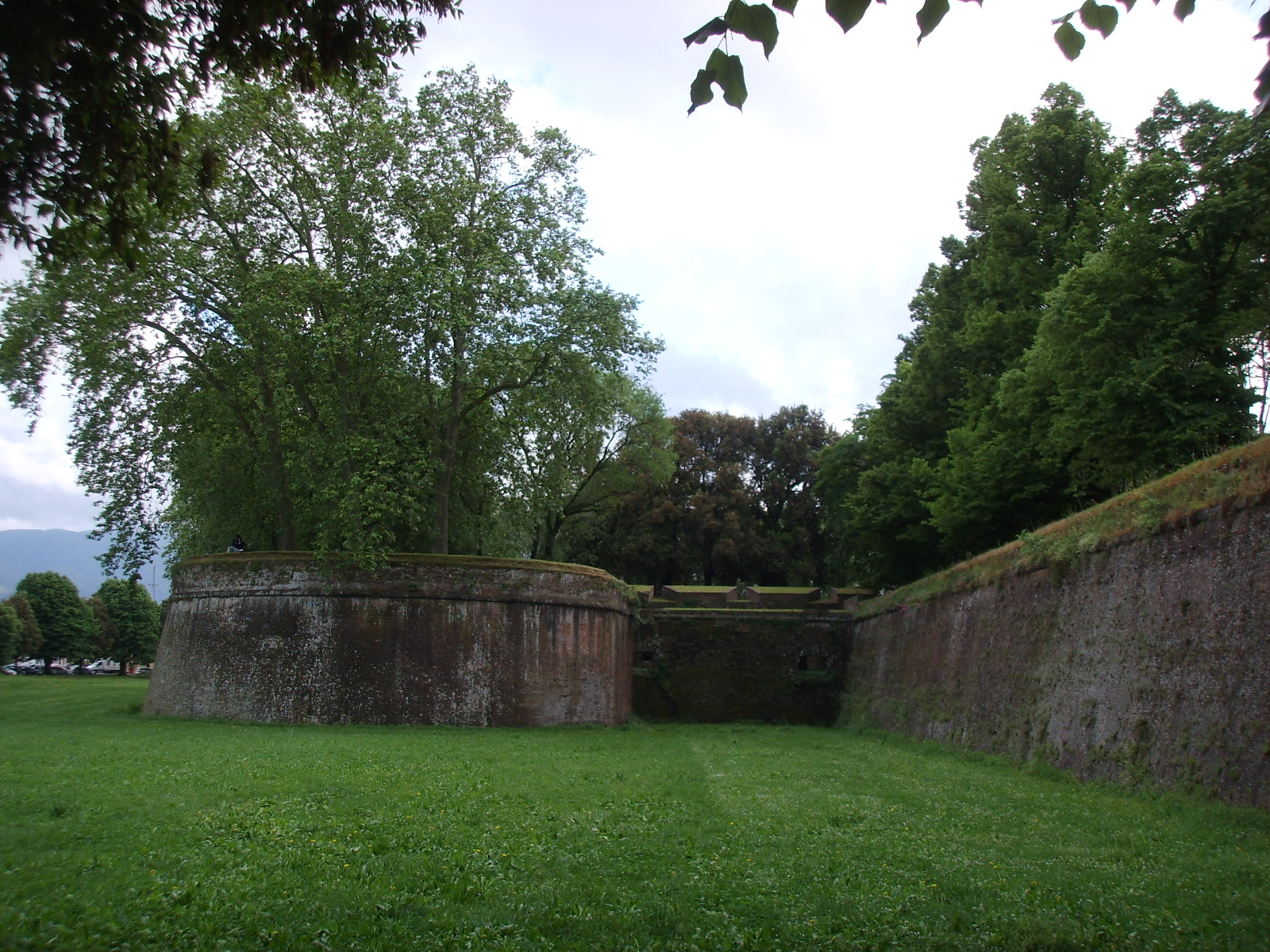
A stretch of walls near Porta Elisa showing a bastion designed to allow reverse fire.

During the Napoleonic domination, under Napoleon's sister Elisa Baciocchi, a door was built for the first time on the eastern side facing towards Florence, which until then for strategic reasons had no access. This gate, appropriately, was called Porta Elisa.

Although designed for exclusive military use, the Renaissance fortifications were considered a magnificent walk from the time of their construction. Trees along the wall, initially planted as a reserve of wood in the event of a siege, further enhanced the appeal as a public space.

The conservation of the moat (although deprived of the counter-shoe) and of some external works (a very rare case in Italy), which currently perform the function of a grandiose public green park surrounding the historic center, is due to this civil use. This function was officially recognized in 1840 with the construction of a café on the Baluardo di Santa Maria then moved further back to create space for the Statue of Vittorio Emanuele II by Augusto Passaglia placed in 1885. The ring road boulevards extend all around, and the only modern intervention on the walls is the opening of the so-called Porta Sant'Anna, of a very different architectural evidence, and the even more modest door of San Jacopo to the tomb, opened in 1940 that citizens familiarly call Il Foro Novo.

=== Construction techniques ===
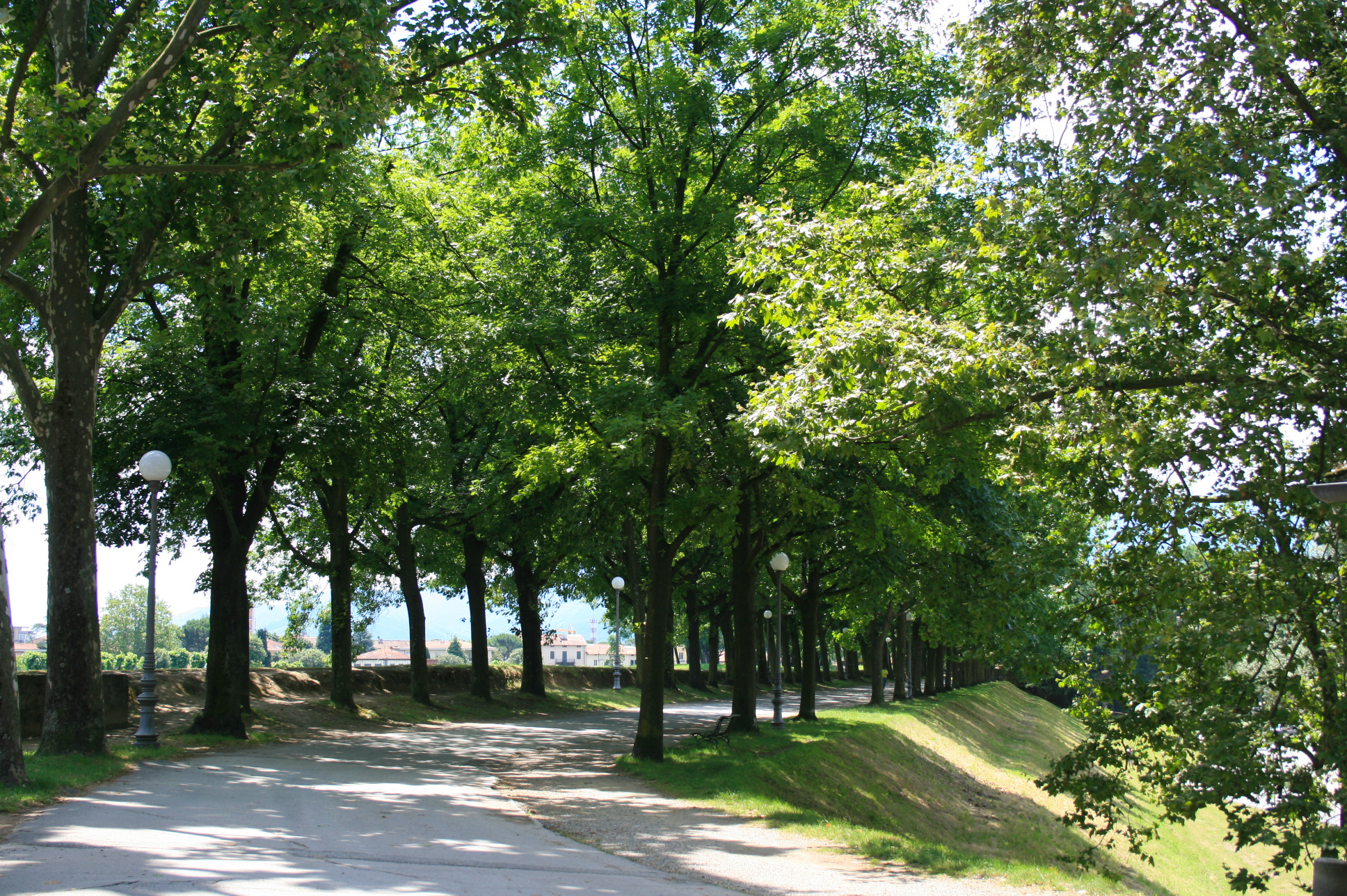
Walkways along the walls

The walls of Lucca are one of the few structures built in perfect symbiosis with the vegetation. The historical sources of the second half of the seventeenth century highlight this, among which we find a report by Giovan Battista Orsucci (1663), who highlighted the structure for its ecological qualities, making it almost seem like a work of naturalistic engineering.

The Renaissance walls were built with a "terrarium technique," an innovative method at the time that focused on the use of natural resources in the defensive and constructive fields. The system used living vegetation as a building material, in combination with man-made materials and dead organic materials. This naturalistic solution, consisting of earthworks and trees, has made it possible to make the structure perform a hydrological function, to drain the ground against landslides and slips and to distribute the loads over large surfaces.

The structure was based on a large mass of pressed and beaten earth together with dried plant materials, enclosed inside by a brick and stone outer layer. The terrariums were mainly coordinated by Vincenzo Civitali, who underlined their importance with respect to the classic brick and stone walls, which had become obsolete in the era of cannons.

For the construction of the walls there was a careful and debated selection of plant materials, with particular attention to drying and processing. In fact, at the base of the construction there were precisely these materials and to highlight it were the multiple collapses in the construction phase, almost all caused by inadequate quality of the organic materials selected.

== Gates of Lucca ==
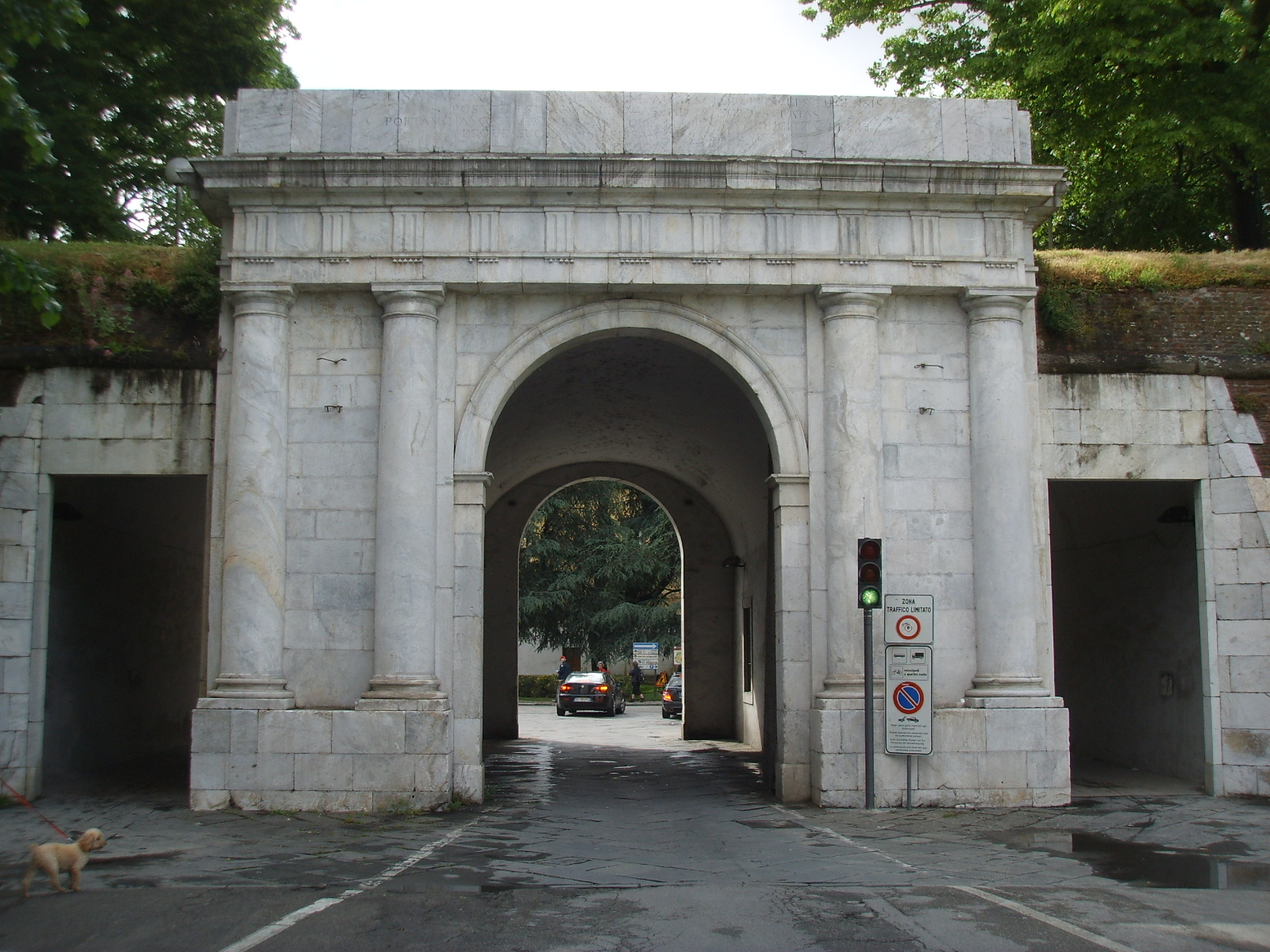
Porta Elisa

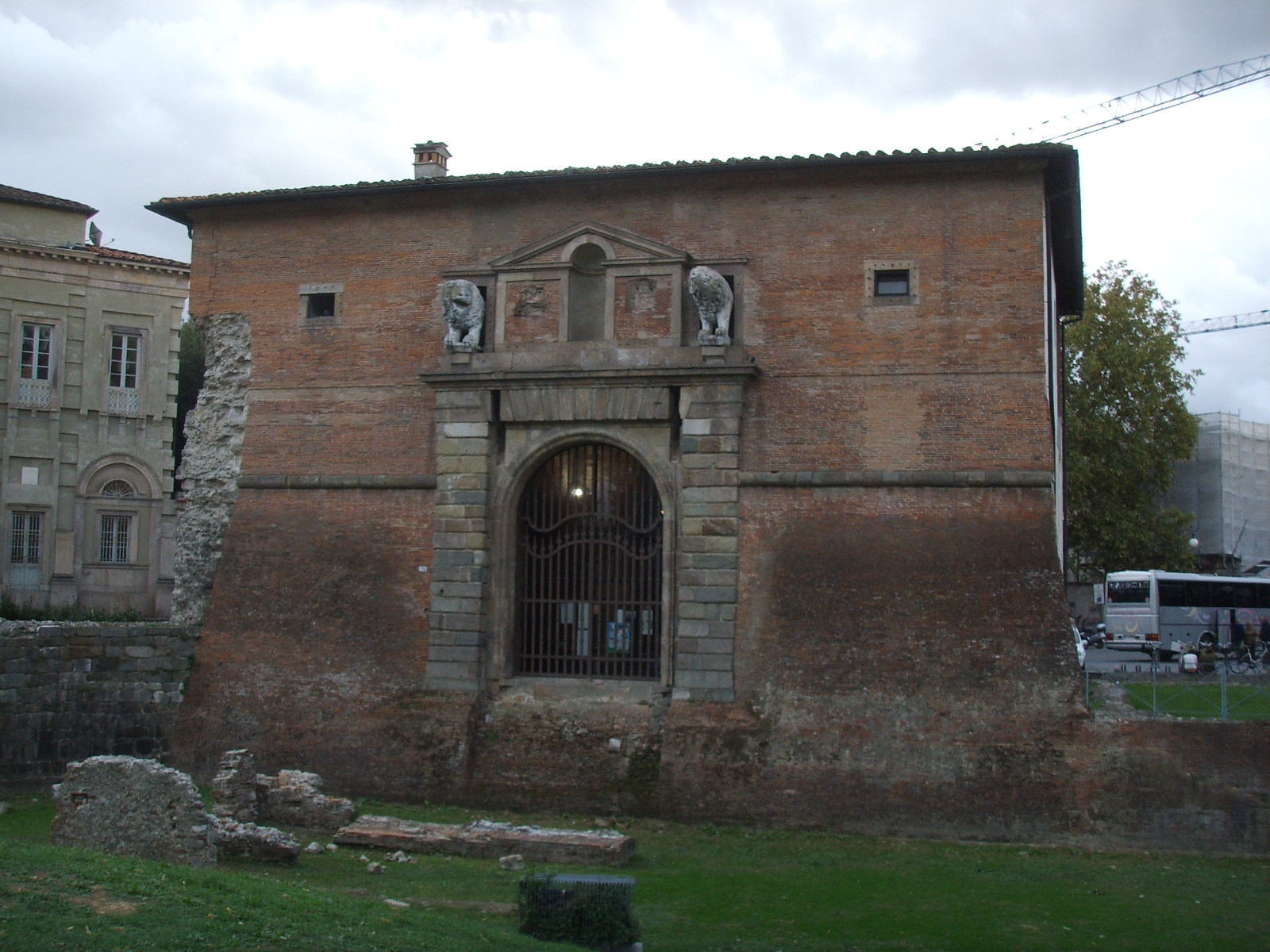
Old San Donato Gate

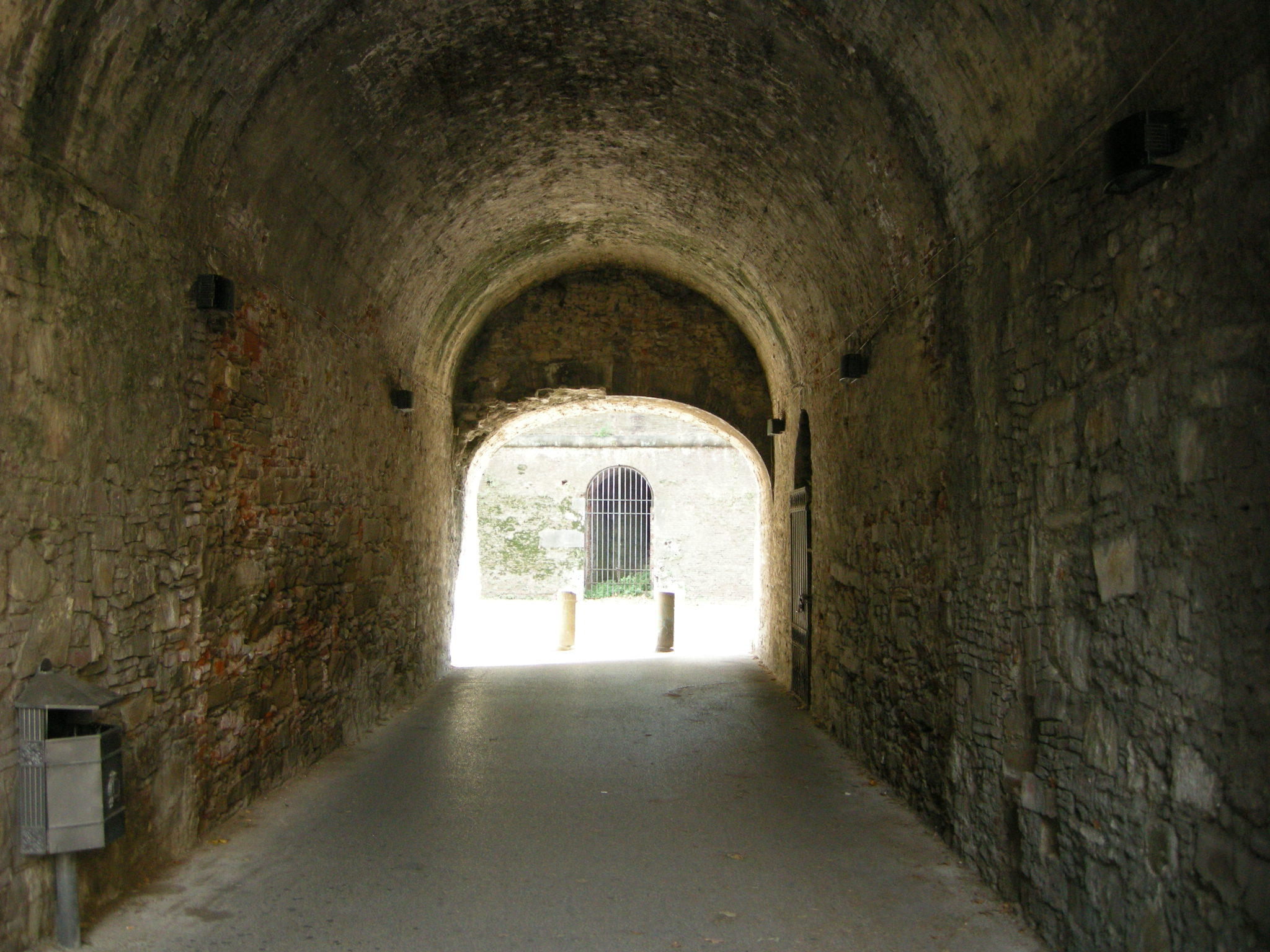
Passage under Baluardo di Santa Maria

The current configuration of the Walls of Lucca provides for the presence of six doors that allow entry into the city. The gates starting from the north and clockwise are:

- Porta Santa Maria (1592), which opens onto Piazza Santa Maria
- Porta San Jacopo alla Tomba (1930), the most recent door
- Porta Elisa (1811), crossed by via Elisa, dedicated to Elisa Baciocchi
- Porta San Pietro (1565), in the direction of the railway station (also known as the "steam door" due to the presence of steam trains), currently the headquarters of the Contrade San Paolino association
- Porta Sant'Anna, which was opened in 1911 on Piazzale Verdi
- Porta San Donato (1629), with piazzale San Donato

It is also possible to enter the city from former posterns in the Renaissance walls, today modified into pedestrian passages and from a passage opened in the nineteenth century to pass a narrow-gauge railway, no longer extant.

Other doors, dating back to earlier walls are still visible within the Renaissance walls:

- Antica Porta San Donato (1590), inside Piazza San Donato is the seat of the tourist information office of Lucca
- Porta San Gervasio (1198), along via del Fosso at the intersection with via Elisa, dates back to the Middle Ages
- Porta dei Borghi (1198) at one end of via Fillungo in the direction of Piazza Santa Maria

The opening of additional doors, which took place only starting in the 19th century, saw numerous debates between citizens and politicians. The theme of the discussions was balancing the safety of the city with the need to open greater direct connections with the territory, in order to respond to the needs of modern mobility.

== Bulwarks along the Walls ==
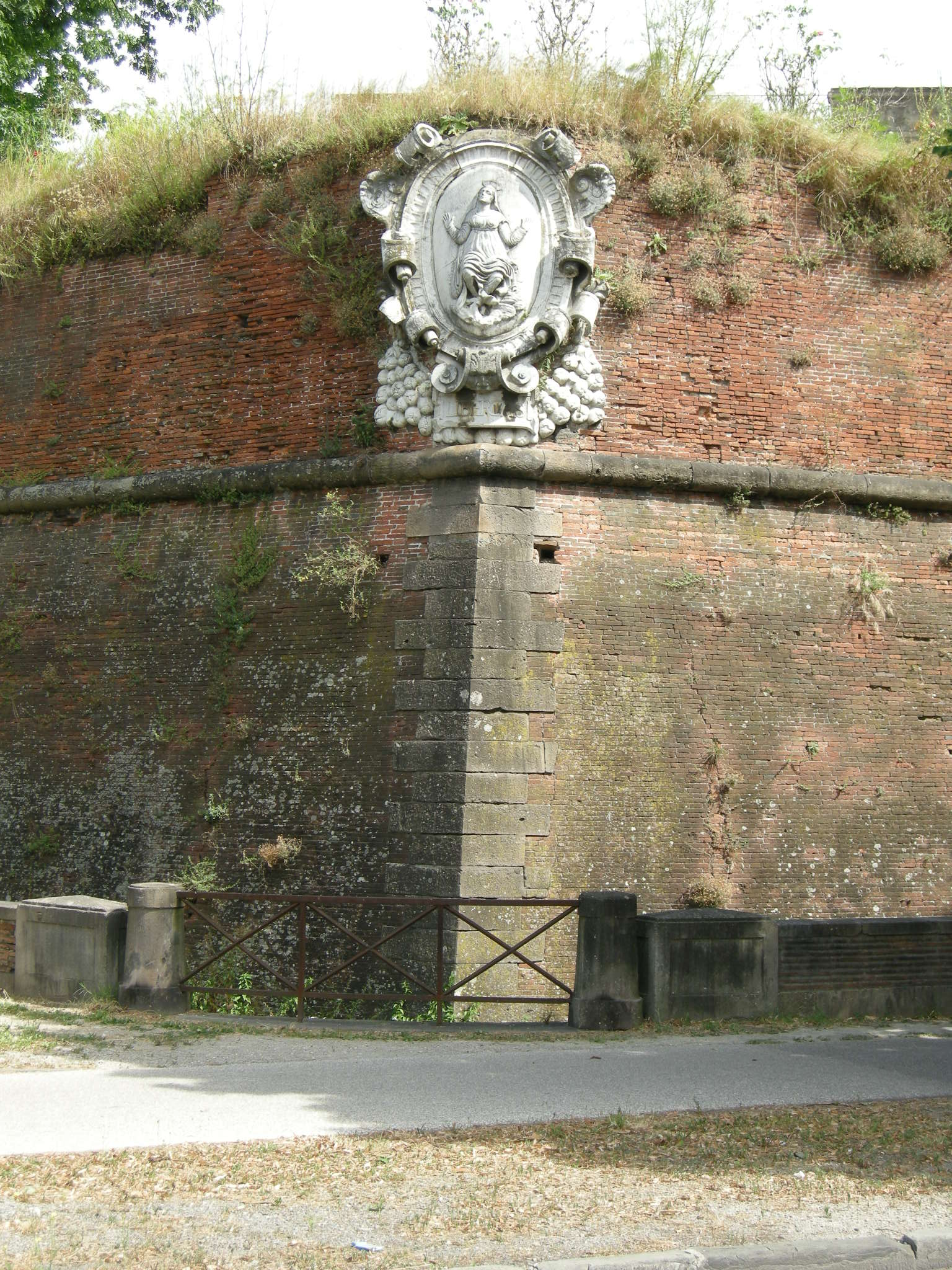
Santa Maria Bastion

The baluardi (bastions or bulwarks) are defensive elements of the walls that extend beyond the curtain wall. In the current city walls there are 11 of them. Starting from Porta Santa Maria you will find:

- Baluardo San Martino
- Baluardo San Pietro
- Baluardo San Salvatore: built on a project by Ginese Bresciani starting from 1592. The construction of this bulwark was decidedly problematic because it was plagued by numerous structural problems attributed to an incorrect choice of construction materials. Nearby is the executioner's house.
- Baluardo Cairoli: built in 1883 for the purpose of extending the Lucca–Ponte a Moriano tramway through the city.
- Baluardo San Regolo
- Baluardo San Colombano
- Baluardo Santa Maria : designed by Baldassarre Lanci of Urbino and built under the coordination of Vincenzo Civitali. The construction was finished in 1557.
- Baluardo San Paolino
- Baluardo San Donato: structured on a medieval curtain and designed by Alessandro Farnese, the bulwark was initially built under the supervision of Vincenzo Civitali. To make room for this, the church of San Donato was demolished in 1513, a gesture that brought a lot of discontent in the ecclesiastical circles, which was then rebuilt inside the walls with the name of San Paolino church. In November 1589 we remember a collapse of the structure relating to the bulwark, attributed to the use of incorrect materials and abundant rains. Following this episode, Ginese Bresciani took the place of Vincenzo Civitali.
- Baluardo Santa Croce
- San Frediano platform

== Bibliography ==
- Giulio Ciampoltrini, Lucca-La prima cerchia C.I.S.C.U, LUCCA 1995.
- Roberta Martinelli - Giuliana Puccinelli Lucca - Le Mura del Cinquecento, vicende costruttive dal 1500 al 1650 Matteoni, Lucca, 1983.
- Roberta Martinelli, La città delle Mura. Progetti e realtà di un'impresa lucchese, Lucca Maria Pacini Fazzi editore 2010.
- P. Mencacci, Le fortificazioni lucchesi della prima metà del XVI secolo, Lucca Pacini Fazzi editore / Accademia Lucchese di lettere Scienze ed arti 2007.
- P. Mencacci, Lucca: le mura medievali, Lucca, S. Marco litotipo, 2002.
- G. Matraia, Lucca nel milleduecento, Lucca 1843.
