= María Carolina Geel =

Chilean writer

- Born: Georgina Elena Silva Jiménez; August 18, 1913; Santiago, Chile
- Died: January 1, 1996 (aged 82); Santiago, Chile
- Occupation: Writer
- Writing career
- Notable work: Cárcel de mujeres

María Carolina Geel, pseudonym of Georgina Elena Silva Jiménez (August 18, 1913, in Santiago – January 1, 1996, in Santiago), was a Chilean writer and literary critic. She was regarded as a very controversial woman, both for her irreverent and daring narrative style and for being involved in one of the most well-known crimes of the time, which took place at the Hotel Crillón.

== Biography ==
She was born into a well-off middle-class family. She was the youngest of six siblings, and her father died when Georgina was only one year old. After her father's death, the family's financial situation worsened. Her formal education only reached the first cycle of Humanities, which she completed at various schools. At age 13, her interests led her to the School of Fine Arts, where she intended to study Sculpture and Drawing, though she did not complete those studies either. Even so, from a very young age she proved to be an avid and self-taught reader. By the age of 14, she was already reading authors such as Nietzsche, Cervantes, Dostoyevsky, Proust, Gide, Rilke, among many others. She would later confess that she could not determine which authors inspired her to write because she had read too many.

In 1926, at the age of 15, she married Pedro Echeverría Muñoz, an investigative officer who worked at a court in the capital. From this marriage, her first and only child, Sergio Alejandro Echeverría Silva, was born in San Vicente de Tagua-Tagua on April 4, 1932. However, some time later, for unknown reasons, the couple divorced. Both her son and her ex-husband settled in Mexico.

After her first failed marriage and in search of financial independence, María Carolina began working as a stenographer at the Caja Nacional de Empleados Públicos y Periodistas (Council of the National Fund for Public Employees and Journalists), a position she held efficiently until 1952. During this period, while living in an apartment at 2212 Las Palmas Street, Apartment 24, in Providencia, she began writing, convinced that this was the pursuit in which she would truly fulfill herself.

She married a second time to a man named René Cárdenas, a doctor about whom little is known, and from whom she later also divorced.

María Carolina suffered from acute hyperesthesia, which caused her severe physical pain.

In 1950, while working at the Public Employees' Fund, she met Roberto Pumarino Valenzuela, a young employee who served as the second head of the machinery section of the same institution. He was a member of the Socialist Party and a leader of the Public Employees' Union Association, affectionately nicknamed "Don Puma" by his colleagues and friends.

Although Pumarino was married and had a child, the two began a romantic relationship despite the noticeable age difference she was 37 and he was 27.

== Literary work ==
=== Fiction ===
She debuted as a novelist with El mundo dormido de Yenia (1946), which received a rather mixed reception from readers. She later published Extraño estío (1947), a story portraying the life of a divorced woman; Soñaba y amaba al adolescente Perces (1949); El pequeño arquitecto (1956); and Huida (1961).

One of the defining features of her works is the importance she gives to female interiority as a gendered construction. At the same time, her literature reflected the struggle for women's social and intellectual liberation.

=== Literary criticism ===
She began her career as a critic with the publication of Siete escritoras chilenas (1949), where she demonstrated her mastery of the subject and her meticulous reading. In this book, she sought engagement with her own gender and with women writers in a way that had not been done before. From that moment on, she focused her work on critical reading of works written by women as well as by non-canonical writers of the time.

She regularly published her writings in newspapers such as El Mercurio, La Crónica, the magazine Atenea, and the weekly PEC (Política, Economía y Cultura).

Alone, one of the literary critics of the time, praised her work and declared himself her most loyal admirer. She also maintained connections with other well-known writers of the era such as Gabriela Mistral, Amanda Labarca, and María Monvel, and in her later years, with poet Eugenio Cruz Vargas, among others.

== The Crillón Hotel crime ==
In February 1955, Pumarino became a widower after his wife suffered a cerebral hemorrhage. He had reportedly tried to separate from her earlier, but she had refused to grant him an annulment. After her death, he asked María Carolina to marry him, but the writer refused, having already endured two failed marriages. Following this rejection, Pumarino became engaged to another woman, younger than María Carolina, and even set a wedding date for May 13 of that same year.

On Tuesday, April 12, 1955, the writer left her downtown apartment to visit a pharmacy on Moneda Street. The painkillers she used for her hyperesthesia were out of stock. Across the street, near the Cervantes cinema, she noticed a national arms shop. She walked toward it but remembered she needed to check the train schedules to Mendoza, Argentina, where she was planning to travel. She learned the train departed Friday at six in the morning. On her way back, she decided to stop again at the gun shop. Finding the prices too high, she continued walking until, on Ahumada Street, she found another arms store and purchased a Belgian Baby Browning pistol caliber 6.35, a small and compact semiautomatic weapon with a six-round magazine. She paid for it and walked home.

The next day, Wednesday, April 13, María Carolina called Pumarino to arrange a meeting. They agreed to have tea at 5:00 p.m. the following day at the well known Hotel Crillón.

On April 14, 1955, around 4:30 in the afternoon, Roberto Pumarino arrived at the hotel located at 1035 Agustinas Street, between Bandera and Ahumada. He went up the marble staircase to the exclusive tea room, ordered a table, and lit a cigarette while waiting. The Crillón was bustling with the social elite — politicians, writers, and upper-class figures — as Schubert's waltz played in the background.

In one corner, the writer Perico Müller ("Perceval") was having tea. At the next table, the poet Matilde Ladrón de Guevara ("Mi patria era su música") was chatting with her sister Lucía.

Fifteen minutes later, Geel arrived wearing a long beige coat and carrying a leather purse. She sat across from Pumarino at a corner table. They ordered tea and began talking calmly. About half an hour later, Pumarino asked for the check. Before he could pay, María Carolina Geel pulled out the pistol she had bought two days earlier and fired five shots at her lover, the first bullet hitting him in the mouth, the last in the liver. Panic erupted in the elegant salon, screams, shattering cups, terrified people hiding under tables or fleeing. But María Carolina, unmoved, threw herself over her lover's lifeless body, took his face in her hands, and kissed him on the mouth, letting his blood stain her fine coat. She clung to him until the police arrived.

Matilde Ladrón de Guevara, a poet who witnessed the event, later recalled:

"They sat at the table next to mine, barely a meter away. She had a hard, dramatic face. I didn't hear any argument. She spoke softly. Suddenly I heard the first shot. I felt the bullet's wind over my head and dove under the table. Then came four more shots. Everyone hid or ran. There was silence. About twenty seconds later, the woman approached the bleeding body and kissed him on the mouth. A policeman took her away. It was shocking to see her covered in blood."

Another witness, waiter Roberto de la Fuente Sáez, testified:

"She seemed a bit agitated. They talked for about forty-five minutes. When she fired, I was just a meter away. I didn't see her take out the gun. Everything happened so fast I couldn't react. He didn't even get to pay the bill. I had to do it myself."

Moments later, police and journalists arrived to find her still clinging to the bloody body. When the officers pulled her away, her victim's blood covered her face and hands. She surrendered without resistance and, as she left the hotel, covered her bloodstained face with the collar of her coat to hide from photographers.

When brought before the judge of the First Criminal Court of Santiago, she simply said:

"Your Honor, I loved Roberto."

To this day, the true motives behind the crime remain a matter of debate. Over time, the press, and experts from psychologists to writers have speculated about possible causes ranging from jealousy to mental imbalance. The truth is, the writer never revealed her reasons.

== Conviction and pardon ==
Initially, she declared that she never intended to kill Roberto Pumarino, claiming she had bought the gun to commit suicide. Ultimately, she chose not to defend herself and was sentenced to 541 days in prison. Later, the Sixth Chamber of the Court of Appeals extended her sentence to three years and one day at the Buen Pastor Correctional Prison, ruling that although Georgina Silva acted with diminished impulse control, she was not entirely deprived of reason. She accepted the verdict without protest.

While serving her sentence at the convent-prison on Lira Street 133, and encouraged by her loyal friend Alone, she wrote one of her most successful novels, Cárcel de mujeres (Women's Prison, 1956). The book made a great impression and paved the way for darker, testimonial-style literature that captured the reality of imprisoned women. It is also considered the first Chilean literary work with lesbian themes.

On August 13, 1956, Gabriela Mistral was persuaded by writers José Santos González Vera and Hernán Díaz Arrieta (Alone) to request a presidential pardon for María Carolina Geel.

At the time, Mistral serving as Chilean consul in Nueva York, sent a letter to President Carlos Ibáñez del Campo.

Which read:

"Honorable Mr. President:

I respectfully ask Your Excellency for a great act of mercy, knowing your compassion and magnanimity, Mr. President.

We humbly request a full pardon for María Carolina Geel, whom we Latin American women hold dear. This would be an unforgettable gesture for all of us.

Please heed this plea, which we make full of hope, and send your noble and just response, as you have always done in similar cases.

Your loyal servant,

Gabriela Mistral."

President Ibáñez responded promptly:

"Know, my dear friend, that the very moment you made your request, it was already attended to and resolved. Consider María Carolina Geel pardoned."

It is worth noting that, according to correspondence between Mistral, González Vera, Alone, and Geel, now digitized and archived in the National Library, the poet was never aware of the actual crime for which she was asked to intercede, since none of her letters mention the murder, and Geel never replied to her letters.

In September 1956, having served nearly half of her sentence, 534 days (1 year, 4 months, and 10 days) and with the support of intellectual circles such as the Chilean Writers' Society, she was released early. Once free, she continued her literary career, living a more secluded life away from society.

== See also ==
- El lugar de la otra
- Alone
- Gabriela Mistral
- María Luisa Bombal
- Edificio Crillón (Santiago de Chile)

== Bibliography ==
- Geel, María Carolina (1956). Cárcel de mujeres (in Spanish). Zig-Zag.
- Zerán, Alia Trabucco (21 July 2020). Las Homicidas / The Murderers (in Spanish). National Geographic Books. ISBN 978-84-264-0757-3.
