= Augusto Passaglia =

Italian sculptor (1838–1918)

Augusto Passaglia (1838 in Lucca – 1918 in Florence) was an Italian sculptor.

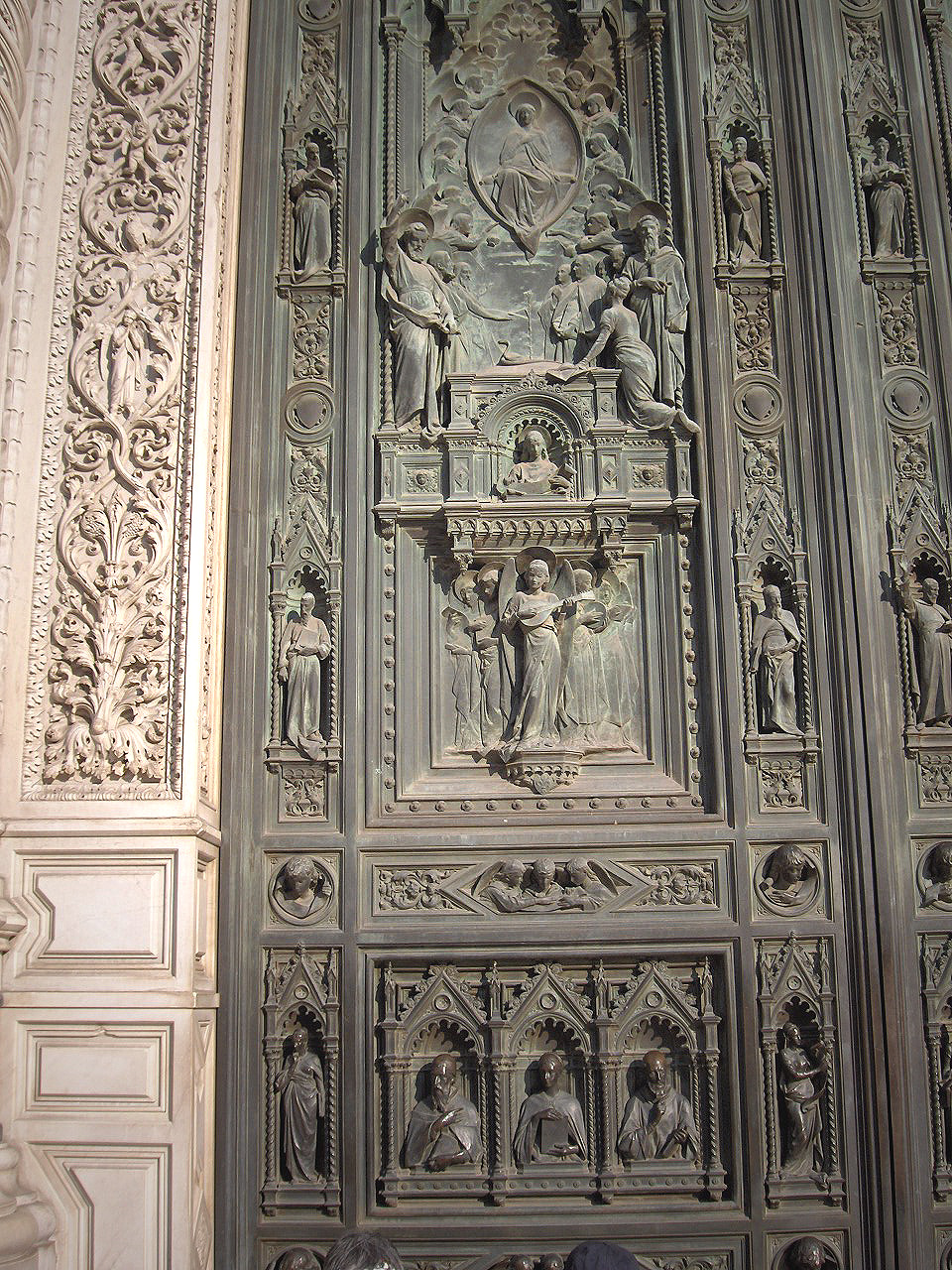
Bronze doors of the Duomo of Florence.

As a young man, he was awarded a stipend to study in Florence under Giovanni Duprè, and was active there for the remainder of his life. Among his first works were a bronze Art and Science' (sold to private buyer in St Petersburg, Russia), and a larger than life statue of the writer Boccaccio, erected in the town of the writer's birthplace, Certaldo. He also sculpted a young Benvenuto Cellini, annoyed of having to play the flute for his father, lays the instrument on his stool, and stretches in an act of extreme disgust.

He submitted proposals for monuments to Vittorio Emanuele for Venice and Turin. While not chosen, his proposal at Turin was awarded a 4000-lire prize, at Venice, 2500 lire. The Turin proposal consisted of the king Vittorio Emanuele astride a horse; while the Venice proposal had him riding alongside the Genius of Peace and Liberty and on the other side, Rome offering her crown to the king. Passaglia's design for a Monument to Vittorio Emanuele in Lucca was accepted, and the work inaugurated by September 20, 1885. It depicts not an equestrian king, but a standing leader of his people, without a crown.

Passaglia also sculpted the monument to the bishop of Lucca, Monsignor Arrigoni, consisting of a bust and a Renaissance-style base. He was commissioned by a lady from America for a sculptural group of Mother and Child. He also completed much work for the facade and other parts of the Duomo of Florence. This included the bronze bas-reliefs for the main entrance of the Cathedral. He also sculpted the marble tympanum that includes of a triangle of 6 meters, representing the seated Madonna surrounded by seraphim; at her feet is the immaculate lamb. Around them are the Gonfaloniere and the Priories of the Florentine Republic (who ordered the construction of the church), Pope Callistus III; Christopher Columbus and his friend the franciscan father Giovanni Perez; Saint Catherine of Siena; and Pope Pius V. He also made two panels in the altar with Queen Ester and the prophetess Debora. The Legend reads: Foederis arra. At the ends of the tympanum, Jacob and Judah. Above the left portal, he sculpted the half-figure of a bound Jesus in the tympanum with two flanking angels below.

Passaglia was named professor of sculpture at the Academy of Fine Arts of Florence, and knight of the Order of the Crown of Italy.

He was commissioned by the city of Lucca a monument to the famous criminalist and lawyer Francesco Carrara.
