= Paseo Ahumada =

Street in commune of Santiago, Chile

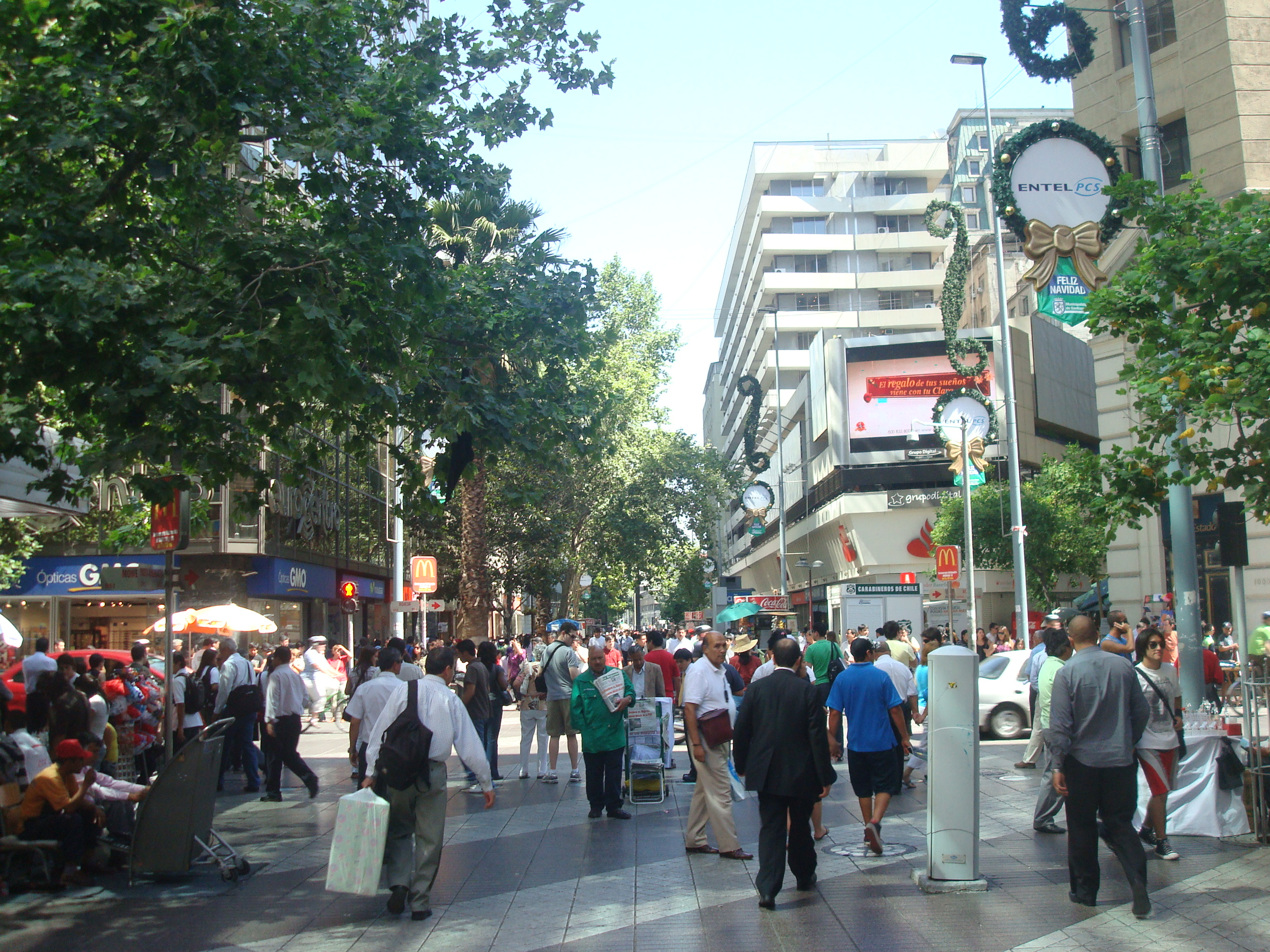
Paseo Ahumada in 2009

Paseo Ahumada is four-block-long street in downtown Santiago. It extends in a north–south direction from Plaza de Armas to the Avenida Libertador General Bernardo O'Higgins and is lined by buildings housing retail establishments at their lower levels. At its northern terminus is Plaza de Armas metro station, whereas that at its southern end is Universidad de Chile metro station.

== History ==
In early 1977, the street began to be transformed into a pedestrian zone, as a measure to reduce the migration of retailers to the then emerging commercial district of Providencia. The renovation was completed in January 1978. Pop jet fountains were placed at both ends of the street. The project was complemented by the construction of a direct entrance to the Universidad de Chile station, which included the first public escalators in Chile.

At present, the street is used by 2.5 million pedestrians each day.

== Notable buildings ==
- Casa matriz del Banco de Chile
- Edificio Crillón (Santiago de Chile)
