= List of companies of Chile =

Location of Chile

Chile is a South American country occupying a long, narrow strip of land between the Andes to the east and the Pacific Ocean to the west. It borders Peru to the north, Bolivia to the northeast, Argentina to the east, and the Drake Passage in the far south. Chilean territory includes the Pacific islands of Juan Fernández, Salas y Gómez, Desventuradas, and Easter Island in Oceania.

Chile is today one of South America's most stable and prosperous nations. It leads Latin American nations in rankings of human development, competitiveness, income per capita, globalization, state of peace, economic freedom, and low perception of corruption. It also ranks high regionally in sustainability of the state, and democratic development. Chile is a founding member of the United Nations, the Union of South American Nations (UNASUR) and the Community of Latin American and Caribbean States (CELAC).

== Notable firms ==
This list includes notable companies with primary headquarters located in the country. The industry and sector follow the Industry Classification Benchmark taxonomy. Organizations which have ceased operations are included and noted as defunct.

Notable companies Status: P=Private, S=State; A=Active, D=Defunct
Name	Industry	Sector	Headquarters	Founded	Notes	Status	
ACE Team	Technology	Software	Santiago	1997	video games	P	A
Aerocardal	Consumer services	Airlines	Santiago	1991	Airline	P	A
AeroEjecutiva	Consumer services	Airlines	Santiago	?	Charter airline	P	A
Aerovías DAP	Consumer services	Airlines	Punta Arenas	1980	Airline	P	A
AES Andes	Utilities	Conventional electricity	Santiago	1921	Electrical utility	P	A
Agrosuper	Consumer goods	Food products	Rancagua	1955	Meat	P	A
Air Comet Chile	Consumer services	Airlines	Santiago	2004	Airline, defunct 2008	P	D
AmnesiaGames	Technology	Software	Santiago	2006	Video games	P	A
AntarChile	Conglomerates	-	Santiago	2003	Timber, oil & gas, shipping and fisheries	P	A
Antofagasta PLC	Basic materials	Nonferrous metals	Santiago	1888	Copper	P	A
Asenav	Industrials	Commercial vehicles & trucks	Valdivia	1973	Shipyard	P	A
Banco BICE	Financials	Banks	Santiago	1979	Bank	P	A
Banco de Chile	Financials	Banks	Santiago	1893	Bank	P	A
Banco de Crédito e Inversiones	Financials	Banks	Santiago	1937	Bank	P	A
Banco del Estado de Chile	Financials	Banks	Santiago	1855	State bank	S	A
Banco Falabella	Financials	Banks	Las Condes	1998	Bank	P	A
Banco Paris	Financials	Banks	Santiago	2004	Bank	P	A
Banco Penta	Financials	Banks	Santiago	2004	Bank	P	A
Banco Ripley	Financials	Banks	Santiago	2003	Bank	P	A
Banmédica	Financials	Life insurance	Santiago	1988	Health insurance	P	A
Behaviour Santiago	Technology	Software	Santiago	2002	Video games	P	A
Calichera	Financials	Investment services	Santiago	2003	Investments	P	A
Canal 13	Consumer services	Broadcasting & entertainment	Santiago	1959	Television	P	A
CAP S.A.	Basic materials	Iron & steel	Santiago	1946	Iron, steel	P	A
Celulosa Arauco y Constitución	Basic materials	Forestry	Santiago	1979	Wood	P	A
Cencosud	Consumer services	Broadline retailers	Santiago	1960	Retail stores	P	A
Central Bank of Chile	Financials	Banks	Santiago	1925	Central bank	S	A
Chilevisión	Consumer services	Broadcasting & entertainment	Santiago	1960	Television	P	A
CMPC	Basic materials	Forestry	Santiago	1920	Wood	P	A
Codelco	Basic materials	Nonferrous metals	Santiago	1955	Copper	P	A
Colbún S.A.	Utilities	Conventional electricity	Santiago	1986	Power transmission	P	A
Compañía de Acero del Pacífico	Basic materials	Iron & steel	Santiago	1946	Steel	P	A
Compañía de las Cervecerías Unidas	Consumer goods	Soft drinks	Santiago	1902	Beverages	P	A
Compañía Electro-Siderúrgica e Industrial de Valdivia	Basic materials	Iron & steel	Valdivia	1926	Ironworks	P	A
Compañia General de Electricidad	Utilities	Multiutilities	Santiago	1905	Electric/gas utility	P	A
Compañía Minera San Esteban Primera	Basic materials	Nonferrous metals	Santiago	1957	Copper, gold	P	A
Concha y Toro	Consumer goods	Distillers & vintners	Santiago	1883	Wine	P	A
Cono Sur Vineyards & Winery	Consumer goods	Distillers & vintners	Santiago	1993	Wine	P	A
Cooperativa Agrícola Pisquera Elqui Limitada	Consumer goods	Distillers & vintners	Vicuña	1938	Spirits	P	A
Cooperativa Agrícola y Lechera de La Unión Limitada	Consumer goods	Soft drinks	La Unión	1949	Dairy	P	A
Copesa	Consumer services	Broadcasting & entertainment	Santiago	1955	Media conglomerate	P	A
Corpbanca	Financials	Banks	Santiago	1871	Commercial bank	P	A
Correos de Chile	Industrials	Delivery services	Santiago	1747	Postal services	S	A
CSAV	Industrials	Marine transportation	Valparaíso	1872	Shipping	P	A
Cumplo	Financials	Specialty finance	Santiago	2011	Crowd funding	P	A
DAP Helicópteros	Consumer services	Airlines	Punta Arenas	1989	Helicopters	P	A
E-CL	Utilities	Conventional electricity	Santiago	1981	Utility	P	A
El Mercurio	Consumer services	Publishing	Vitacura	1827	Newspaper	P	A
Empresa de los Ferrocarriles del Estado	Industrials	Railroads	Santiago	1884	National railway	P	A
Empresa Nacional del Petróleo	Oil & gas	Exploration & production	Santiago	1950	State-owned gas and oil	S	A
Empresas Copec	Consumer services	Integrated oil & gas	Santiago	1934	Oil and gas, retail	P	A
ENAER	Industrials	Aerospace	Santiago	1984	State-owned defense, aircraft	S	A
Endesa	Utilities	Conventional electricity	Santiago	1943	Electric utility	P	A
Enersis	Utilities	Conventional electricity	Santiago	1889	Electric power	P	A
Entel	Telecommunications	Fixed line telecommunications	Santiago	1964	Telecommunications	P	A
Entel Phone	Telecommunications	Mobile telecommunications	Santiago	1997	Mobile phones, part of Entel	P	A
Falabella	Consumer services	Broadline retailers	Santiago	1889	Department stores	P	A
FAMAE	Industrials	Defense	Santiago	1811	State-owned firearms	S	A
Ferronor	Industrials	Railroads	Santiago	1997	Railway	P	A
Fondo Nacional de Salud (FONASA)	Health care	Health care providers	Santiago	1979	Health distributions	P	A
IANSA	Consumer goods	Food products	Santiago	1953	Sugar	P	A
Inversiones Aguas Metropolitanas	Utilities	Water	Santiago	1999	Sanitation	P	A
Jumbo	Consumer services	Food retailers & wholesalers	Santiago	1976	Hypermarkets	P	A
Kingston Family Vineyards	Consumer goods	Distillers & vintners	Casablanca	1990	Wine	P	A
Kunstmann	Consumer goods	Brewers	Valdivia	1997	Brewery	P	A
La Cuarta	Consumer services	Publishing	Santiago	1984	Newspaper	P	A
La Nación	Consumer services	Publishing	Santiago	1917	Newspaper	P	A
La Polar	Consumer services	Broadline retailers	Santiago	1920	Retail stores	P	A
La Segunda	Consumer services	Publishing	Santiago	1931	Newspaper	P	A
La Tercera	Consumer services	Publishing	Santiago	1950	Newspaper	P	A
Las Últimas Noticias	Consumer services	Publishing	Santiago	1902	Newspaper	P	A
LATAM Airlines Group	Consumer services	Airlines	Santiago	2012	Airline holding group	P	A
LATAM Cargo Chile	Industrials	Delivery services	Santiago	1929	Cargo airline, part of LATAM Airlines Group	P	A
LATAM Chile	Consumer services	Airlines	Santiago	1929	Airline, part of LATAM Airlines Group	P	A
LATAM Express	Consumer services	Airlines	Santiago	1998	Airline, part of LATAM Airlines Group	P	A
Latin American Wings	Consumer services	Airlines	Santiago	2015	Charter airline	P	A
Líder	Consumer services	Food retailers & wholesalers	Santiago	1893	Hypermarket, now part of Walmart (US)	P	A
Mall Plaza	Consumer services	Broadline retailers	Santiago	1990	Malls	P	A
Masisa	Basic materials	Forestry	Santiago	1920	Wood	P	A
Mega	Consumer services	Broadcasting & entertainment	Santiago	1990	Television	P	A
Miguel Torres Chile	Consumer goods	Distillers & vintners	Curicó	1979	Wine	P	A
Minera Escondida	Basic materials	Nonferrous metals	Santiago	1978	Copper	P	A
Minera Valparaíso	Conglomerates	-	Santiago	1906	Industrial holdings, utilities	P	A
Navimag	Industrials	Marine transportation	Puerto Montt	1979	Ferries	P	A
Ochagavia Wines	Consumer goods	Distillers & vintners	Macul	1851	Wine	P	A
One Airlines	Consumer services	Airlines	Santiago	2013	Airline, defunct 2020	P	D
Oro Blanco	Financials	Investment services	Santiago	1983	Investments	P	A
PAL Airlines	Consumer services	Airlines	Las Condes	2003	Airline, defunct 2014	P	D
París	Consumer services	Broadline retailers	Santiago	1900	Department stores, part of Cencosud	P	A
Parque Arauco S.A.	Consumer services	Broadline retailers	Santiago	1979	Malls	P	A
Pilmaiquén S.A.	Utilities	Alternative electricity	Santiago	1986	Hydroelectric	P	A
Provida	Financials	Asset managers	Santiago	1981	Pension fund management	P	A
Redbanc	Financials	Banks	Santiago	1987	Banking network	P	A
Ripley S.A.	Consumer services	Broadline retailers	Santiago	1956	Department stores	P	A
SalfaCorp	Financials	Real estate holding & development	Santiago	1926	Real estate	P	A
Santa Isabel	Consumer services	Food retailers & wholesalers	Santiago	1976	Supermarkets	P	A
Santiago Stock Exchange	Financials	Investment services	Santiago	1893	Primary exchange	P	A
Sky Airline	Consumer services	Airlines	Santiago	2001	Airline	P	A
SM-Chile	Financials	Equity investment instruments	Santiago	1996	Financial holdings, including Banco de Chile	P	A
Sociedad Química y Minera	Basic materials	Specialty chemicals	Santiago	1968	Chemicals	P	A
Socovesa	Financials	Real estate holding & development	Santiago	1967	Real estate	P	A
Sodimac	Consumer services	Home improvement retailers	Renca	1952	Home improvement	P	A
Sonda S.A.	Technology	Software	Santiago	1974	Information technology	P	A
Soprole	Consumer goods	Milk products	Santiago	1949	Dairy, part of Grupo Gloria (Peru)	P	A
SVR Producciones	Consumer services	Broadcasting & entertainment	Santiago	1987	Record label	P	A
Televisión Nacional de Chile	Consumer services	Broadcasting & entertainment	Santiago	1969	Television	S	A
Tottus	Consumer services	Food retailers & wholesalers	Santiago	2002	Supermarket	P	A
Transbordadora Austral Broom S.A.	Industrials	Marine transportation	Punta Arenas	1968	Water transport	P	A
Vigatec	Industrials	Industrial machinery	Santiago	1980	Industrial equipment	P	A
VTR	Telecommunications	Fixed line telecommunications	Santiago	1928	Telecommunications	P	A

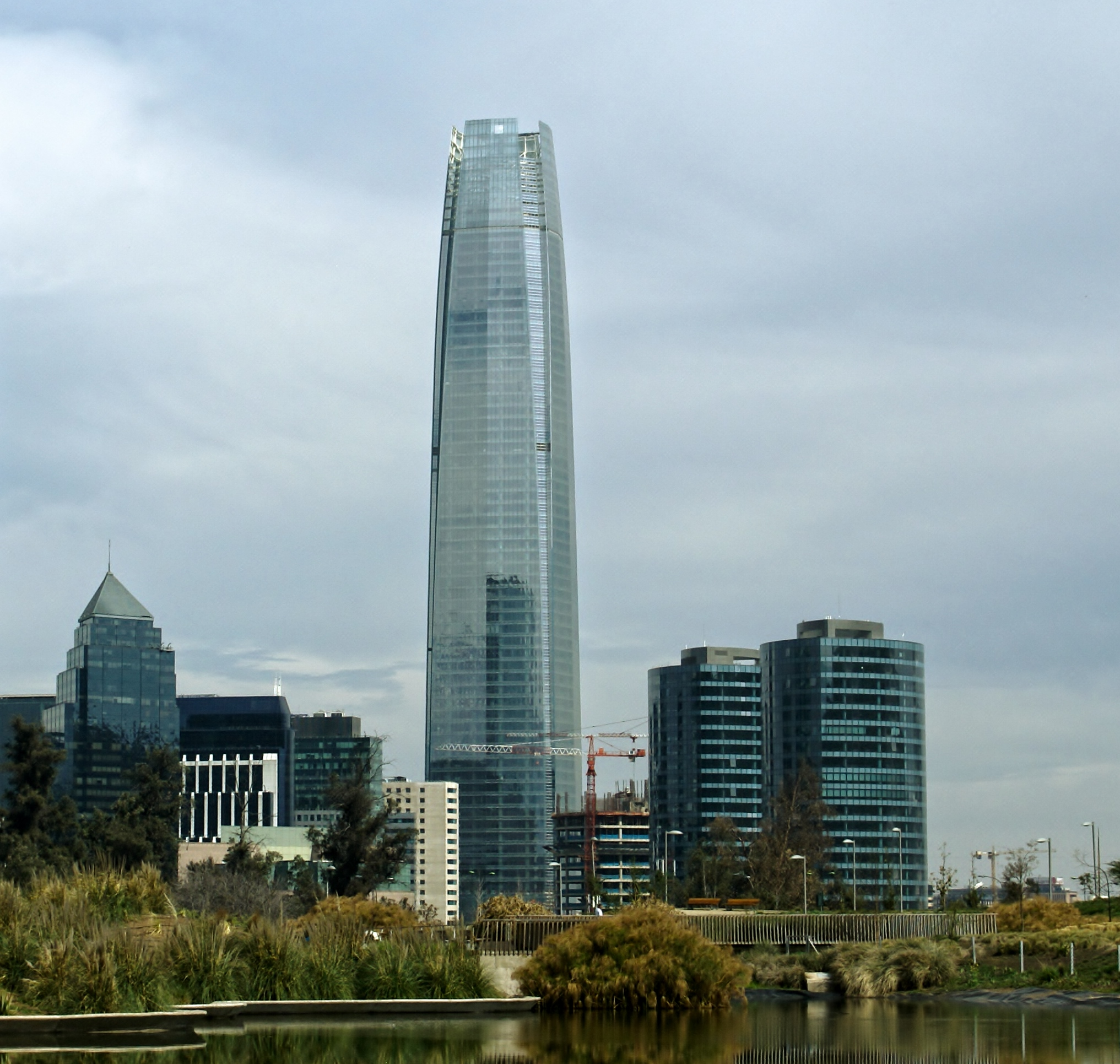
Sanhattan, the financial district in Santiago de Chile.

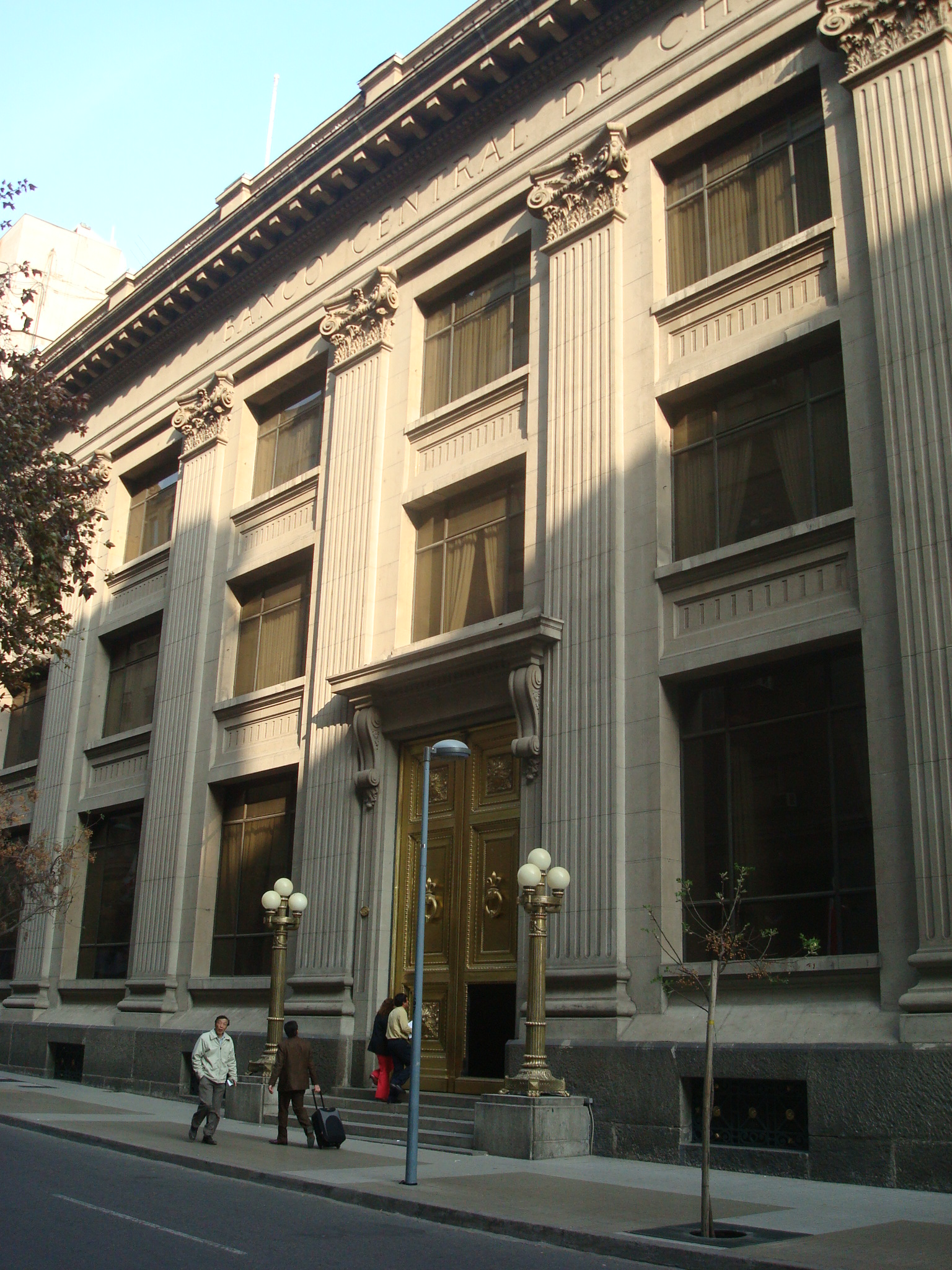
Front view of the Central Bank of Chile building.

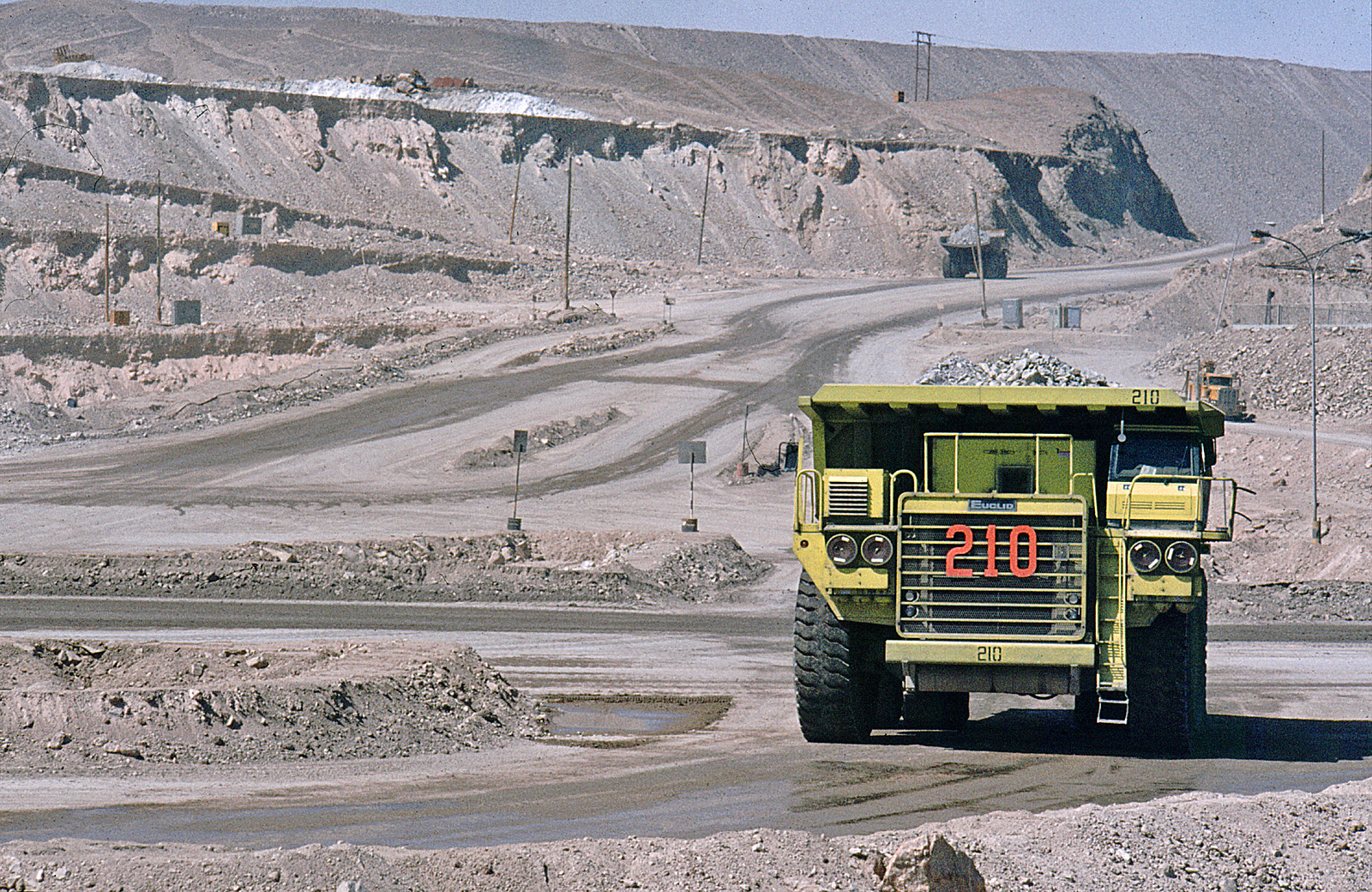
Chuquicamata copper mine.

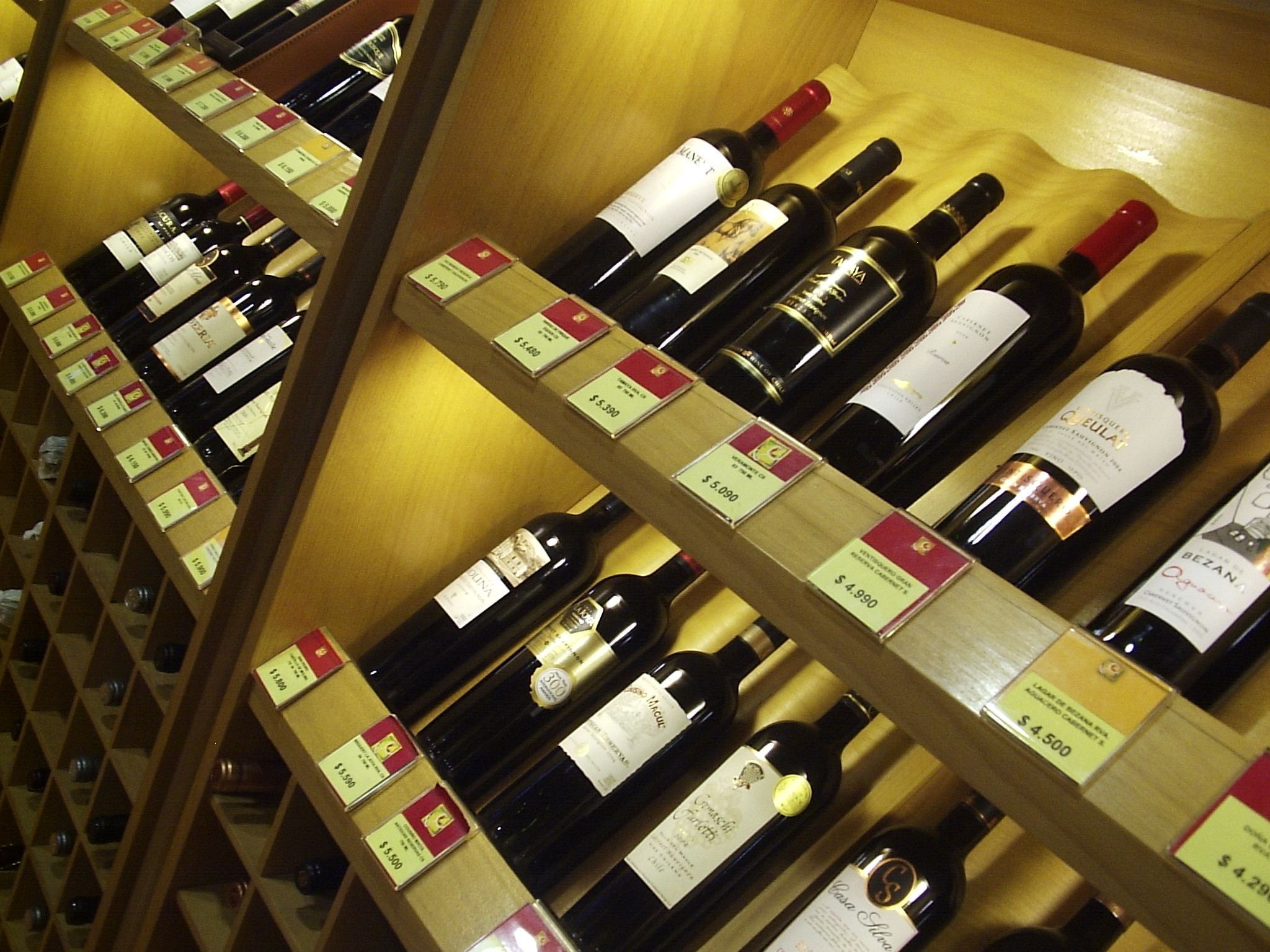
Wines of Chile.

== See also ==
- List of airlines of Chile
- List of banks in Chile
- List of newspapers in Chile
- List of shopping malls in Chile
