= Índice de Precios Selectivo de Acciones =

Chilean stock market index

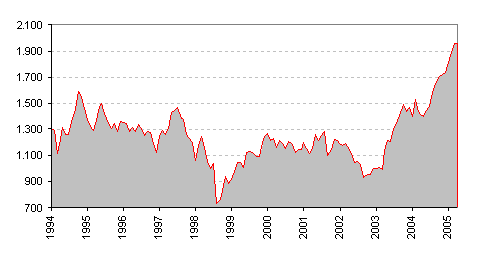
Evolution of IPSA, 1994-2005.

The Indice de Precios Selectivo de Acciones (S&P/CLX IPSA) is a Chilean stock market index composed of the 30 stocks with the highest average annual trading volume in the Santiago Stock Exchange (Spanish: Bolsa de Comercio de Santiago). In the past, the index was re-based back to 1000 on the last trading day of each year. The index has been calculated since 1977 and is revised on a quarterly basis.

== Composition ==
IPSA's component companies as of 13 January 2022 are:

Symbol	Company	Industry
AGUAS-A	Aguas Andinas	Water & Sanitation
ANDINA-B	Embotelladora Andina	Beverages
BCI	Banco de Crédito e Inversiones	Banks
BSANTANDER	Banco Santander Chile	Banks
CAP	CAP	Mining
CCU	Compañía Cervecerías Unidas	Beverages
CENCOSHOPP	Cencosud Shopping	Retailers
CENCOSUD	Cencosud	Retailers
CHILE	Banco de Chile	Banks
CMPC	Empresas CMPC	Wood Pulp
COLBUN	Colbún	Electricity
CONCHATORO	Viña Concha y Toro	Wines
COPEC	Empresas Copec	Conglomerate
ECL	Engie Energía Chile	Electricity
ENELAM	Enel Américas	Electricity
ENELCHILE	Enel Chile	Electricity
ENTEL	Entel Chile	Telecoms
FALABELLA	S.A.C.I. Falabella	Retailers
IAM	Inversiones Aguas Metropolitanas	Water & Sanitation
ITAUCORP	Itaú Corpbanca	Banks
MALLPLAZA	Mallplaza	Shopping Mall Developer
PARAUCO	Parque Arauco	Shopping Mall Developer
RIPLEY	Ripley	Retailers
SECURITY	Grupo Security	Banks
SMU	SMU	Retailers
SONDA	Sonda	Software
SQM-B	Sociedad Química y Minera de Chile	Chemicals
VAPORES	Compañía Sudamericana de Vapores	Shipping
