= Andrés Navarro Haeussler =

Chilean businessman

- Born: Andrés Navarro Haeussler; Santiago de Chile
- Occupation: CEO of Sonda SA

Andrés Navarro Haeussler (born in Santiago de Chile, November 30, 1948) is a Chilean businessman.

He was born in Santiago de Chile, studied at the Colegio San Ignacio and the Pontifical Catholic University of Chile, where he graduated as Industrial Engineer.

In 1974 he founded the company Sonda SA, a leading IT services provider in Latin America., which is present in 9 countries of the region (Argentina, Brazil, Chile, Colombia, Costa Rica, Ecuador, Mexico, Peru and Uruguay) and has with about 10 000 employees. Today, Andrés Navarro is president and CEO of Sonda, a position he has held for 36 years. He is also director of SalfaCorp and a shareholder in AFP Modelo and Banco Internacional, among other companies. He is a member of the Board of Universidad San Sebastián (USS).

Andrés Navarro Haeussler was formerly chairman of the Teletón Foundation, director of LAN Airlines, Chilevisión, Viña Santa Rita, chairman of Clinica Las Condes among other companies and institutions.

In his career he has received numerous awards, among which are Icare Award, Entrepreneur of the Year (2003), Ignaciano of the Year (2009), Business Center Award of Santiago Chamber of Commerce (2009), and College of Engineering of Chile Prize (2010).
