= Arena Corinthians =

Stadium in São Paulo, Brazil

Neo Química Arena
- Arena Corinthians
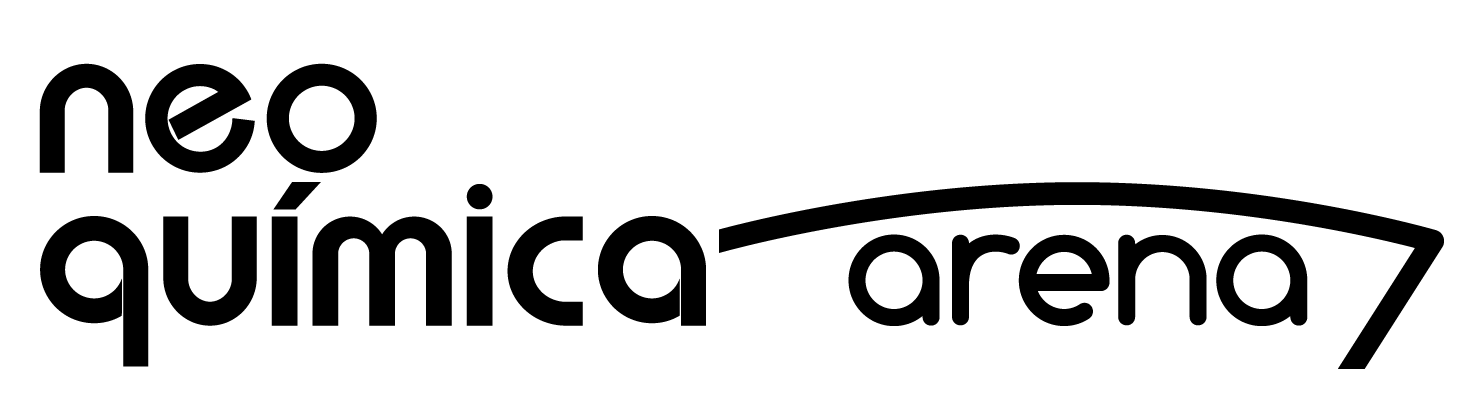

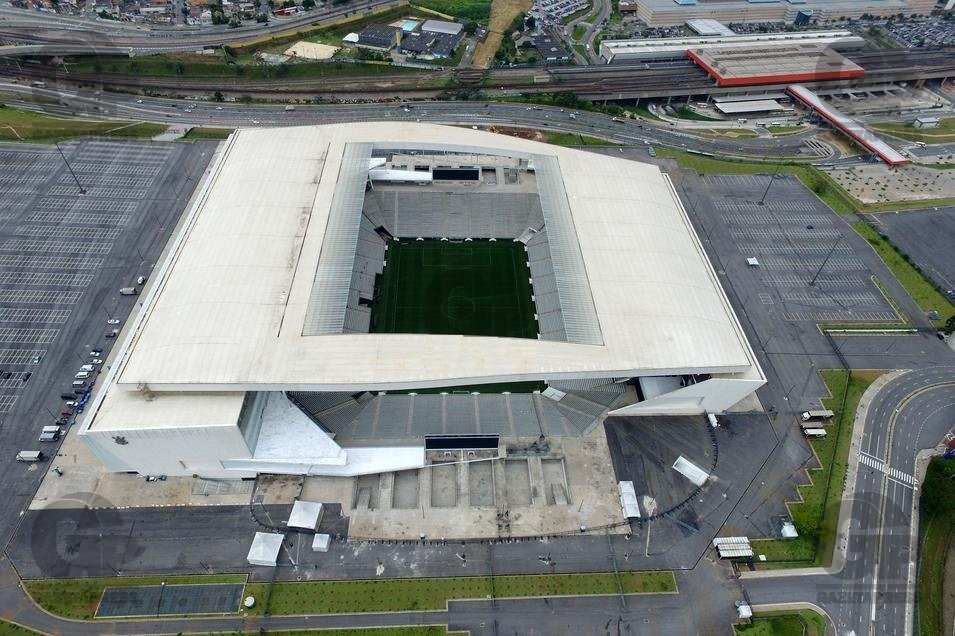
- Sisbrace
- Interactive map of Neo Química Arena
- Former names: Arena Corinthians (2014–2020); Arena de São Paulo (during the 2014 FIFA World Cup) and Arena Itaquera (during the 2027 FIFA Women's World Cup)
- Location: Avenida Miguel Ignácio Curi, 111; São Paulo, Brazil
- Coordinates: 23°32′43″S 46°28′27″W
- Owner: Corinthians
- Operator: Corinthians
- Capacity: 48,905; 68,727 (2014 FIFA World Cup)
- Executive suites: 89
- Type: Stadium
- Event: Sporting Events
- Surface: Perennial Ryegrass with Artificial Fibres (Desso GrassMaster)
- Scoreboard: Four high-resolution 30 by 7.5 metres (32.8 by 8.2 yd) LED screens
- Record attendance: 63,267 (Netherlands – Argentina, 9 July 2014) 48,932 (Corinthians – Palmeiras, 27 March 2025)
- Field size: 105 by 68 metres (115 by 74 yd)
- Field shape: rectangular
- Public transit: Corinthians-Itaquera; Itaquera Bus Terminal

Construction
- Groundbreaking: 30 May 2011
- Built: 30 May 2011 – 15 April 2014
- Opened: 10 May 2014
- Cost: R$ 965 million; US$ 435 million; € 319 million
- Architects: Aníbal Coutinho, Gensler
- Project manager: Andrés Sánchez
- Structural engineer: Werner Sobek
- Services engineer: Frederico Barbosa
- Main contractor: Odebrecht

Tenants
- Corinthians (2014–present); Brazil national football team (selected matches); NFL International Series (2024–present)

Website
- neoquimicaarena.com.br

The Arena Corinthians, officially known as the Neo Química Arena for sponsorship reasons, is a football-specific stadium located in Itaquera district, São Paulo, Brazil which serves as the home of the Brazilian professional football club SC Corinthians Paulista. With a seating capacity of 48,905, it is the seventh-largest stadium among clubs in the Campeonato Brasileiro as of 2026 and is also the 7th-largest stadium in Brazil.

The stadium has hosted multiple events since its opening in May 2014. During the 2014 FIFA World Cup, it hosted six matches, including the opening game and the third-place match. It will host ten matches in the 2027 FIFA Women's World Cup, including the third-place match. The Arena Corinthians was also the site of the first ever National Football League (NFL) game held in South America, played between the Philadelphia Eagles and the Green Bay Packers on 6 September 2024.

== History ==
=== Background ===
In 1980, Corinthians were planning on building a new 21,304-capacity stadium, as their own Alfredo Schürig Stadium, also known as Parque São Jorge, held a capacity below 14,000, and the city's Pacaembu Stadium had to be shared with other teams. The club's president Vicente Matheus asked for a concession from São Paulo's mayor Olavo Setúbal in the Itaquera district, east of the city centre. The mayor accepted the request on 10 November 1978 and a concession for 90 years was granted on 26 December 1978 for a 197,000 square metres (49 acres) property. The area was owned at the time by COHAB, an agency for public housing controlled by the São Paulo City government. The original plan was to build the stadium in three to five years. The concession was renewed in 1988 for 90 years, with the condition that any construction made in the area would revert to the city at no cost. However, funding was not obtained and other alternatives were considered, such as a concession for the Pacaembu Stadium and demolishing the Alfredo Schürig Stadium to make room for another.

On 31 August 2010, Corinthians announced the construction of the stadium with an estimated cost of R$335 million and an expected gross revenue of R$100 million per year. The original plans allowed for an expansion to 70,000 seats. The club expected to get financing from BNDES and sell the naming rights for the stadium to pay for the construction costs. The main architect of the project was Aníbal Coutinho from CDC (Coutinho Diegues Cordeiro Arquitetos), a Rio de Janeiro-based architectural firm. The stadium was planned to be completed by March 2013.

=== FIFA World Cup 2014 hosting ===
Accenture estimated that the World Cup opening would bring R$30.75 Billion over 10 years to the city's economy; the study's results encouraged Brazil to site the opening match in São Paulo. A study from Fundação Getúlio Vargas estimated R$1 Billion in revenue during the World Cup, as 290 thousand tourists were expected for the event. After Morumbi Stadium was deemed unsuitable by FIFA, the Local World Cup Committee looked for alternatives and set on offering Arena Corinthians to host the opening game; FIFA accepted the suggestion and confirmed the decision on 10 October 2011. Hosting the opening game required modifications to the project that raised the cost from the original R$335 million to R$1.07 billion to accommodate FIFA's requirements. Cuts in equipment, furniture and construction costs reduced the cost. Because of FIFA's agreements with Brazil, none of the construction work related to the World Cup was taxed by the Federal Government; the final price agreed upon was R$820 million.

A new contract was signed on 19 July 2011 with Odebrecht; R$400 million of the total would be financed by BNDES and the remaining R$420 million would come from tax credits granted by the city. A 2007 law stated the tax credits could be used by any company that established itself in the Eastern region of the city, providing a credit of R$0.60 per R$1.00 invested. A new law was passed by the city legislature to deal specifically with this stadium and reduce the incentives, linking the concession of the credits to hosting the World Cup opening match and limiting the total amount of credits to R$420 million. The concession was justified by the expectation that the stadium will generate R$950 million in city taxes during the six years after its opening. R$530 million in excess of the tax credits were given. The financing contract with BNDES was signed on 29 November 2013, under their ProCopas Arenas World Cup program. Caixa Econômica Federal is the distributing agent.

The estimated construction cost did not include the R$38.1 million required for adding temporary bleachers, which were removed after the World Cup was over. They were set on one of the sides and on the north and south ends. The addition of the bleachers would raise the stadium's capacity up to 72,000 seats, but would necessitate the relocation of VIP areas and television equipment reducing capacity. Corinthians paid for additional temporary infrastructure required exclusively for the World Cup, which was estimated to cost between R$60 million and 100 million.

== Project costs and revenue ==
The stadium eventually cost R$965 million, 15% more than originally estimated. The two-year delay in receiving BNDES funds caused an increase of R$108 million to the cost because of the difference in interest between loans taken from regular banks and from the government agency. Temporary structures were included in the total cost, currently estimated to be R$77 million. After the sale of the tax credits received, Corinthians will have to pay between R$700 and R$750 million spread over 12 years. Aníbal Coutinho projected the stadium to generate R$150 million per year. Andres Sanchez expects revenue to reach R$200 million per year and expenses to be up to R$35 million per year. Revenue will come from ticket sales and commercial properties in the arena, especially corporate conventions, fairs and events. On 25 August 2013, Andres said that out of 16 naming rights properties, he had already secured seven buyers, although no deals had yet been formalised. The club plans to sell the stadium naming rights for R$400 million for 20 years.

=== Construction ===
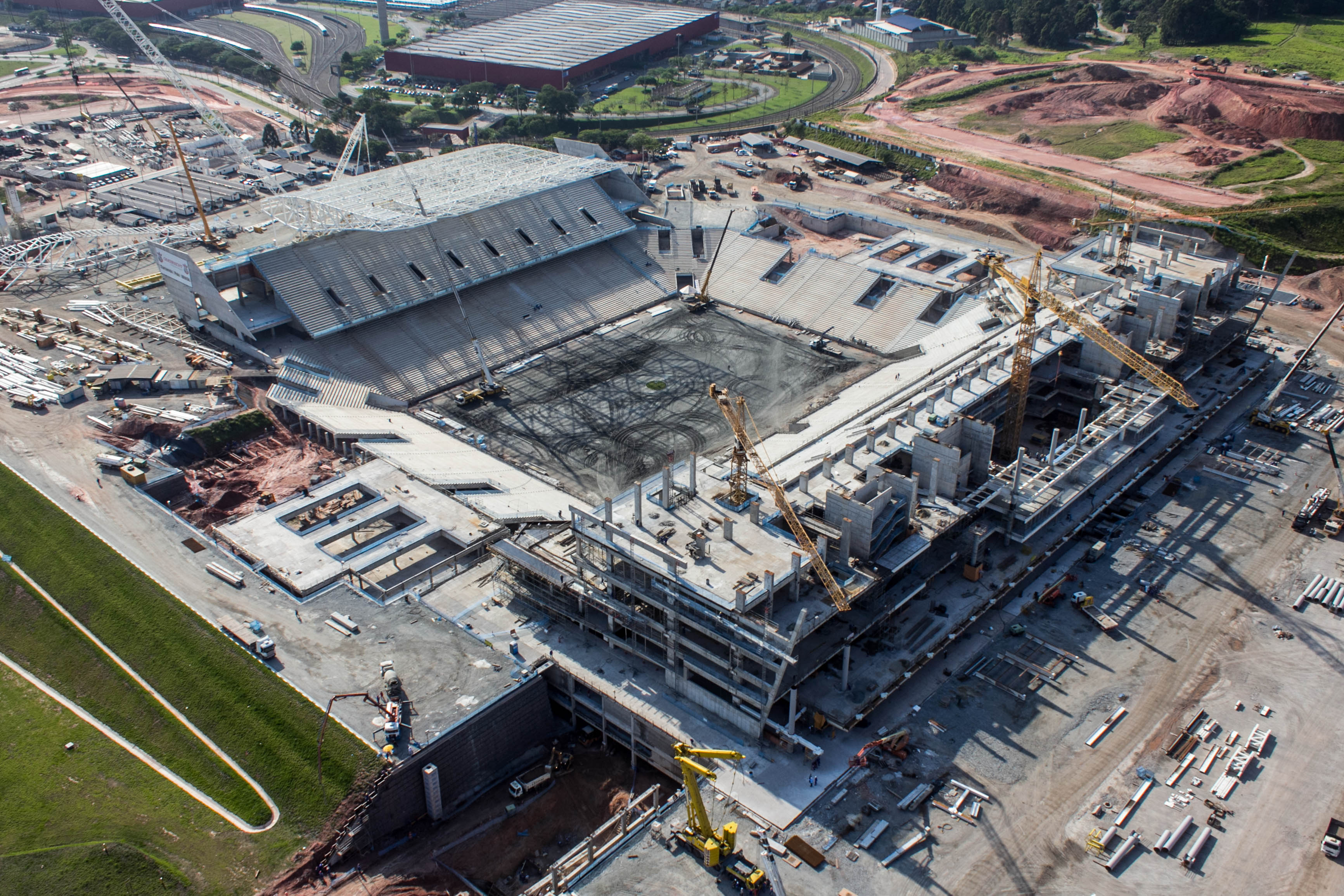
The stadium under construction in December 2012

The stadium was inaugurated on 15 April 2014. Modifications for hosting the World Cup were still underway until the club handed the arena to FIFA for the competition on 20 May 2014. The peak number of workers on site was 2,300, recorded in November 2012. The enterprise generated 26 thousand jobs during its construction.

=== Renovations ===
After the World Cup, Corinthians formally moved into the stadium; it was 92% ready for their use just after the tournament, and was completely retrofitted by February 2015. The estimated cost of the renovations was R$20 million. One of the largest changes was the construction of large balconies and the installation of scoreboards behind the goals where the temporary seating was installed for the World Cup.

==== Landscaping ====
The west side has a large, tree-lined, pedestrian mall with a reflecting pool and new illumination. The reflecting pools also work as a performance fountain, providing splash and spectacle at programmed moments during stadium events. Around the complex, granite flooring have stripes evocative of the club's second uniform, in synchronisation with the external illumination. There are benches and large gardens; the media centre is housed in one of them. The landscaping was designed by John Loomis, who headed the Burj Khalifa project. Lighting was projected by the American firm T. Kondos.

=== Stadium firsts ===
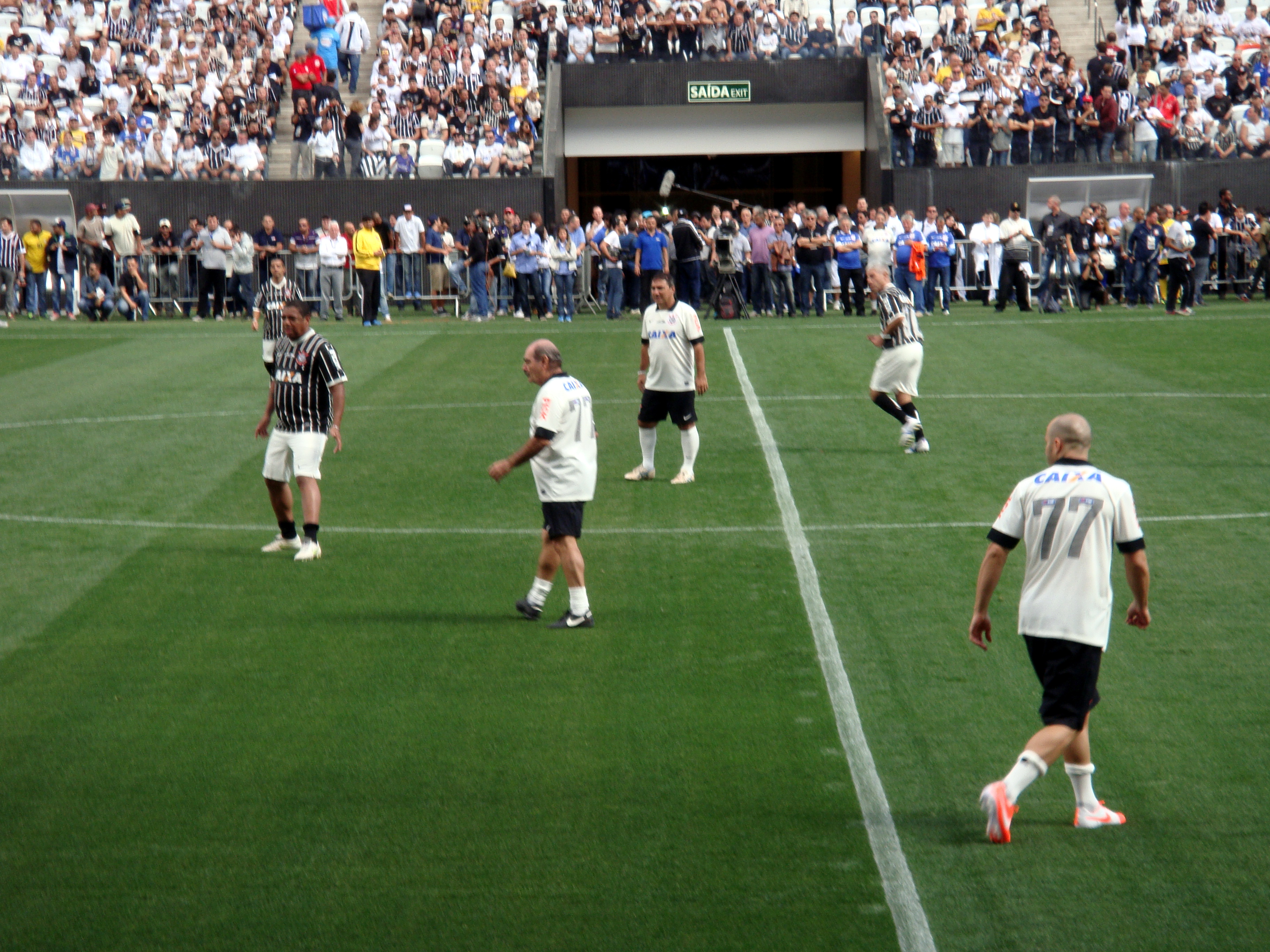
Rivellino (between Vampeta and Alessandro) scored the first goal at the inaugural match at Arena Corinthians

The first event held in the arena was an Ivete Sangalo show for 3,000, celebrating the club's 103rd anniversary on 29 September 2013. The first public football matches at the stadium consisted of friendlies between former Corinthians players on 10 May 2014. More than 100 players played at the event.

The first goal at the new stadium was scored by Rivellino from a penalty kick conceded by Palhinha. Rivellino shot at his own goal because all the players on the pitch insisted that the first goal at the Arena was his. The kick went past Ronaldo. The first competitive game was a 2014 Campeonato Brasileiro Série A match between Corinthians and Figueirense on 18 May 2014, when hosts Corinthians lost to Figueirense 0–1. The first international match was the opening match for the 2014 FIFA World Cup between Brazil and Croatia on 12 June 2014.

== International events ==
=== 2014 FIFA World Cup ===
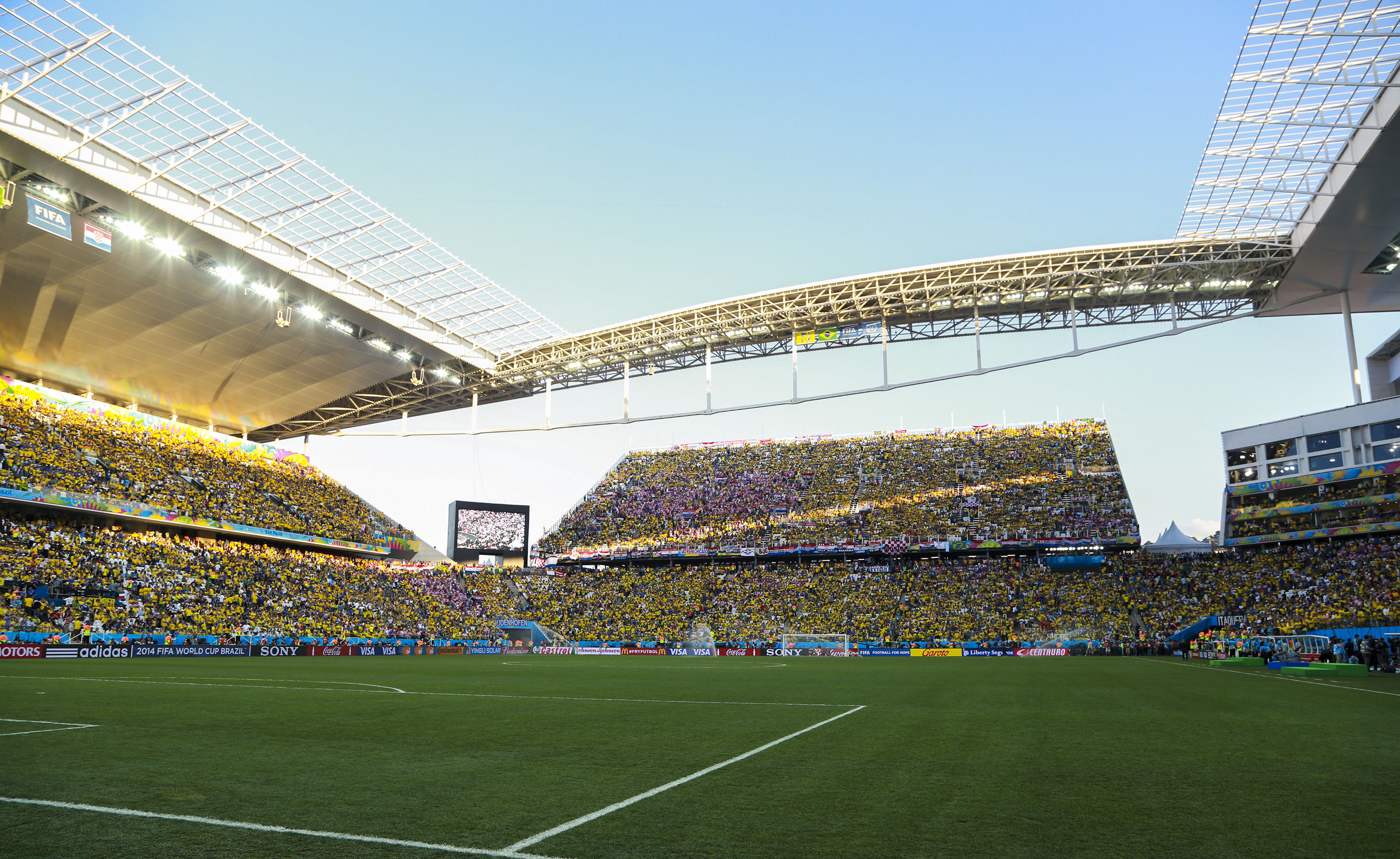
Temporary seating and scoreboard on the south end for the World Cup

The stadium was one of the venues for the 2014 FIFA World Cup. Because of FIFA rules, it was called Arena de São Paulo during the tournament. The stadium hosted the opening ceremony followed by the opening match between Brazil and Croatia, three other group stage matches, a Round 16 match and a semi-final. Because of the request of at least 65,000 seats for the World Cup opening match, temporary seats were added to the stadium for the tournament, although the final usable capacity only reached 62,200 for the opening match.

As the original screens were too large to be used with the temporary seating installed, temporary screens were rented specially for the World Cup. FIFA requires screens smaller than the originally projected, with a 90 square metres (970 sq ft) area. Because subsequent matches had lower VIP and press demands, 4,000 more seats were added, raising the usable capacity to 66,200.

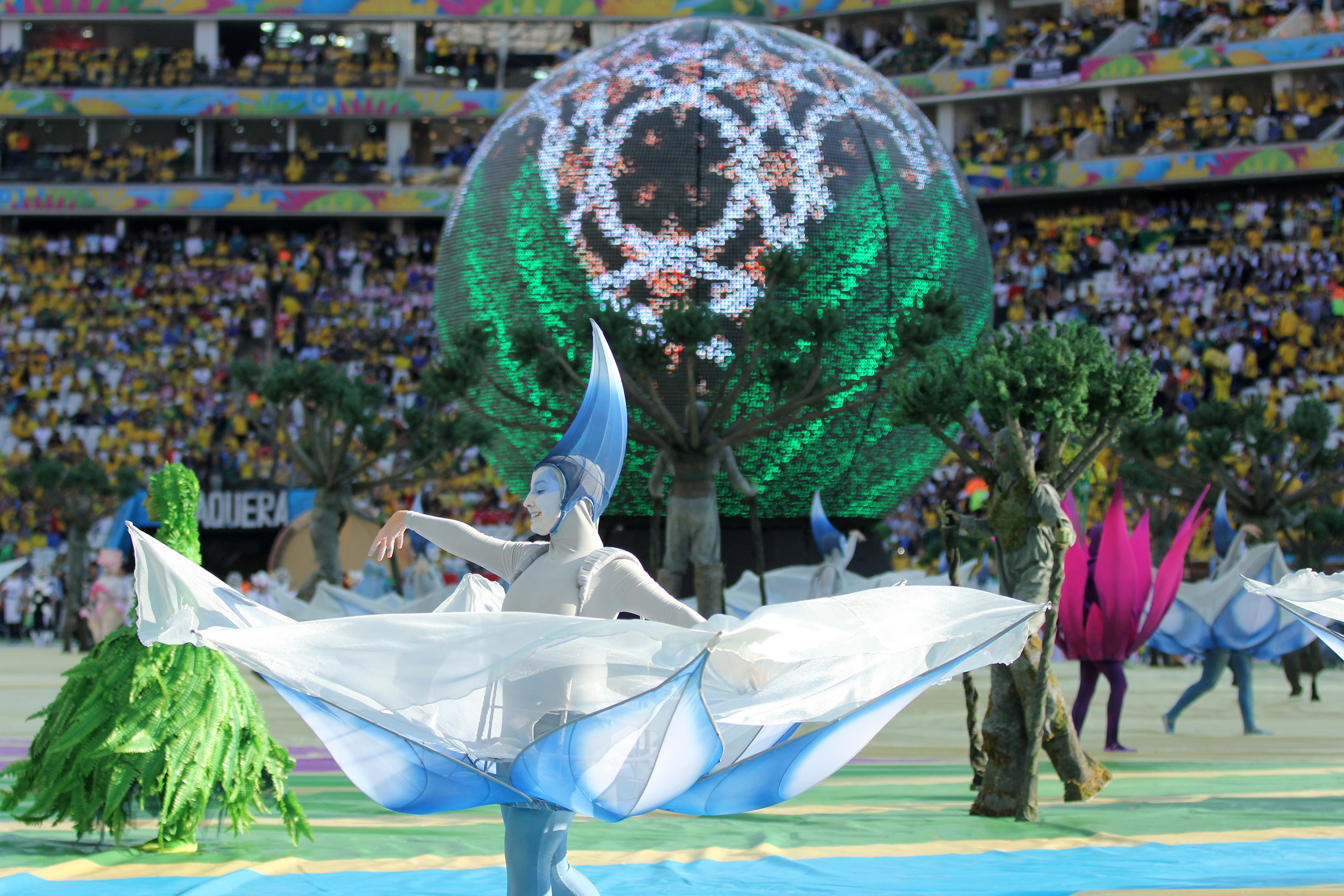
FIFA World Cup 2014 Opening Ceremony

Date	Time (UTC-03)	Team #1	Result	Team #2	Round	Attendance
12 June 2014	17:00	Brazil	3–1	Croatia	Group A (Opening Match)	62,103
19 June 2014	16:00	Uruguay	2–1	England	Group D	62,575
23 June 2014	13:00	Netherlands	2–0	Chile	Group B	62,996
26 June 2014	17:00	South Korea	0–1	Belgium	Group H	61,397
1 July 2014	13:00	Argentina	1–0 (a.e.t)	Switzerland	Round of 16	63,255
9 July 2014	17:00	Netherlands	0–0 (a.e.t) (2–4 p)	Argentina	Semi-finals	63,267

=== 2016 Summer Olympics ===
Arena Corinthians was one of the venues of the 2016 Summer Olympics football tournament. It was chosen instead of competitors Morumbi Stadium—the chosen venue before Arena Corinthians was built— and Allianz Parque. Sixteen games were played in the stadium from 3 to 16 August 2016; they were divided equally between men's and women's tournaments. Two matches were played at 17:00 and 21:30 hours on competition days.

==== Women's tournament ====
Date	Time (UTC-03)	Team #1	Res.	Team #2	Round	Attendance
3 August 2016	15:00	Canada	2–0	Australia	Group F	20,521
3 August 2016	18:00	Zimbabwe	1–6	Germany	Group F	20,521
6 August 2016	15:00	Canada	3–1	Zimbabwe	Group F	30,295
6 August 2016	18:00	Germany	2–2	Australia	Group F	37,475
12 August 2016	19:00	Canada	1–0	France	Quarterfinal	38,688
19 August 2016	13:00	Brazil	1–2	Canada	Bronze Medal Match	39,718

==== Men's tournament ====
Date	Time (UTC-03)	Team #1	Result	Team #2	Round	Attendance
10 August 2016	19:00	Colombia	2–0	Nigeria	Group B	36,702
10 August 2016	22:00	South Africa	1–1	Iraq	Group A	37,742
13 August 2016	22:00	Brazil	2–0	Colombia	Quarterfinal	41,560
17 August 2016	16:00	Nigeria	0–2	Germany	Semifinal	35,562

=== 2019 Copa América ===
Arena Corinthians was one of the venues of the 2019 Copa América.

Date	Time (UTC-03)	Team #1	Res.	Team #2	Round	Attendance
22 June 2019	16:00	Peru	0–5	Brazil	Group A	42,317
28 June 2019	20:20	Colombia	0–0 (4–5 pen.)	Chile	Quarter-finals	44,062
6 July 2019	16:00	Argentina	2–1	Chile	Third place match	44,269

=== 2027 FIFA Women's World Cup ===
Arena Corinthians was one of the venues of the 2027 FIFA Women's World Cup.

Date	Time (UTC-03)	Team #1	Result	Team #2	Round	Attendance
25 June 2027	--:--	B3	v	B4	Group B	
27 June 2027	--:--	F3	v	F4	Group F	
30 June 2027	--:--	Brazil	v	A3	Group A	
1 July 2027	--:--	D4	v	D2	Group D	
4 July 2027	--:--	H4	v	H2	Group H	
8 July 2027	--:--	G4	v	G1	Group G	
11 July 2027	--:--	Winner Group D	v	Runner-up Group C	Round of 16	
17 July 2027	--:--	Winner Match 55	v	Winner Match 56	Quarter-finals	
20 July 2027	--:--	Winner Match 57	v	Winner Match 58	Semi-finals	
24 July 2027	--:--	Loser Match 61	v	Loser Match 62	Third place play-off	

=== NFL International Series ===
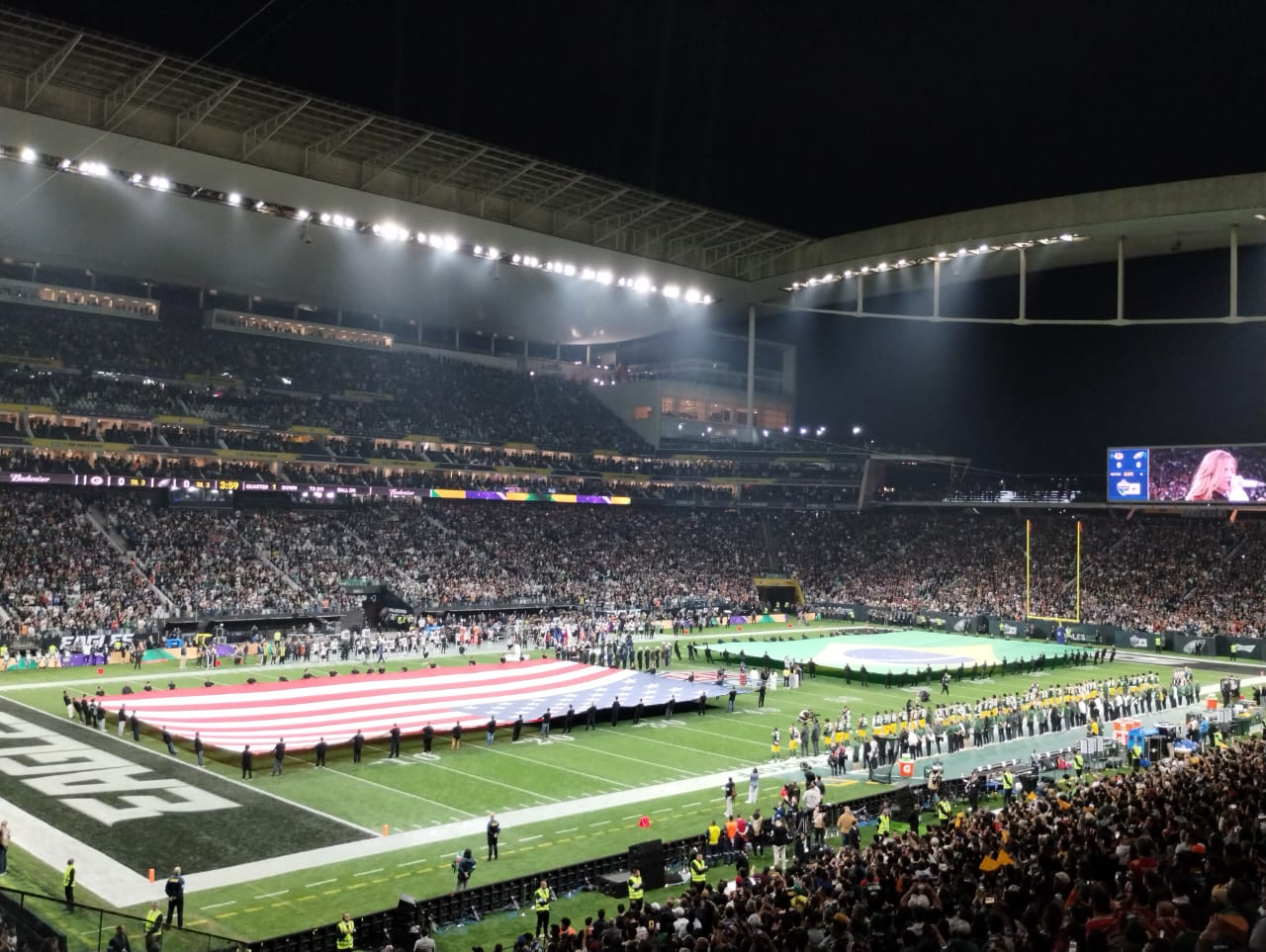
Photo of the opening ceremony of the game between the Green Bay Packers and the Philadelphia Eagles, on 6 September 2024 at Neo Química Arena.

In November 2023, the National Football League (NFL) announced it would play its first game in South America at the Arena Corinthians during the 2024 season. The league announced in February 2024 that the Philadelphia Eagles would host the Green Bay Packers during the first week of the regular season on 6 September 2024. On 19 February 2025, the NFL announced it would return to Arena Corinthians during the 2025 season on 5 September 2025, with the Los Angeles Chargers hosting the Kansas City Chiefs.

Year	Date	Designated visitor	Score	Designated home team	Score	Attendance
2024	6 September	Green Bay Packers	29	Philadelphia Eagles	34	47,236
2025	5 September	Kansas City Chiefs	21	Los Angeles Chargers	27	47,627

== Names ==
The stadium was called Estádio do Corinthians by Corinthians when it was announced. The name being used on the club's official website is Arena Corinthians. The Brazilian Football Confederation uses the name Arena Corinthians. FIFA referred to the stadium as Arena de São Paulo during the World Cup, but also recognises the name Arena Corinthians. The largest media company in Brazil, Rede Globo, uses Arena Corinthians like sports diary Lance! Local media have tried to give it nicknames. For example, newspaper Folha refers to Arena Corinthians as Itaquerão; O Estado de S. Paulo uses both the neighbourhood-based nickname and the official name. Rede Record uses Fielzão.

The club planned to sell the stadium naming rights for R$400 million for 20 years. A study by Brunoro Sports Business estimated that the value should be R$21 million per year. Companies that sought to buy the naming rights included Petrobras, Ambev, Grupo Petrópolis, Etihad Airways, Qatar Foundation, Caixa Econômica Federal, Emirates, Bradesco, Telefonica, BMG, Itaú Unibanco, Santander Group, Kalunga and Zurich Insurance Group.

On 1 September 2020 (Corinthians' 110th anniversary), a special event live from the stadium was held to announce the Arena's new name. It was officially renamed Neo Química Arena, part of a 20-year partnership with Hypera Pharma, Brazil's largest pharmaceutical company. Neo Química is Hypera's generic drugs division, which already served as Corinthians' main sponsor during the 2010 and 2011 seasons. The full contract is expected to be around R$300–320 million.

== Architecture ==
Aníbal Coutinho designed the stadium to be one "that would help the supporters, that would help the team to win matches, I wanted to make the supporters get on the pitch". Aníbal led a team of 25 architects. The complex is in a 197,095 square metres (48.703 acres) property. The built up area is 189,000 square metres (47 acres) with 17,500 cubic metres (620,000 ft^{3}) of concrete. 80% of the structural construction is made of precast elements, 40% manufactured on a 7,500 square metres (81,000 ft^{2}) plant on-site.

The rectangular, 267 by 228 metres (876 by 748 ft), 43 metres (141 ft) tall stadium has two buildings; the main building on the west side and another on the east side. When measurements are taken from the pitch, the east side height is 51 metres (167 ft), the west side is 57 metres (187 ft) and the north and south ends are 15 metres (49 ft) tall. The pitch sits at exactly 777 metres (2,549 ft); Aníbal Coutinho said, "The number 77 is considered lucky for the club. The club is located at 777 São Jorge St. and it brings to mind the 1977 that they won one of their most celebrated championships of all time." (the Campeonato Paulista of 1977).

=== West and east sectors ===
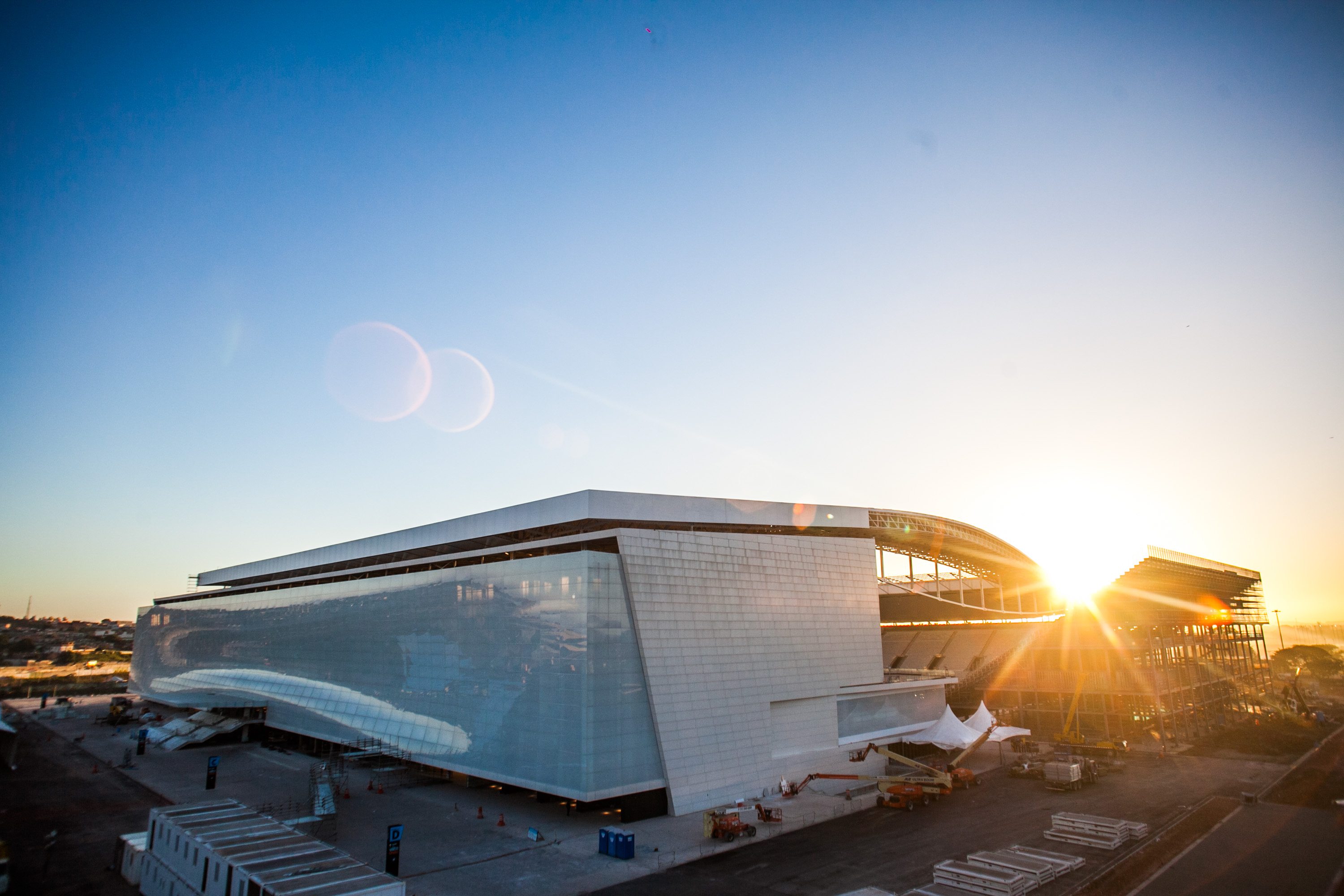
West side of the stadium

The west side has a 6,200 square metres (67,000 ft^{2}) façade. VIP seats, television crew equipment, press and most box seats are in the west building. The glass has been designed with a curvature intended to simulate the visual effect of a ball hitting the net. Special, seamless, 26 metres (85 ft) beams have been developed to support the structure. The geometry consulting company Evolute GmbH developed panelling that rationalised the 5,400 square metres (58,000 ft^{2}) double-curved freeform glass surface into 855 planar and cylindrical panels, all in hot bent toughened glass. This solution allowed for minimising the number of shapes necessary by 93%, reducing costs considerably. The photo-voltaic glass powers the air conditioning. The complete glass structure is 6,900 square metres (74,000 ft^{2}) counting the sides; the façade width is 220 metres (720 ft) by 24 metres (79 ft) tall.

The east side of the stadium houses one of the largest video screens of the world, 170 by 20 metres (558 by 66 ft)—3,400 square metres (37,000 ft^{2}). It has 210,000 individual LEDs; 1,320 custom made luminaires are fitted in 4 metres (13 ft) long glass sheets. The screen is manufactured by Osram Traxon and is controlled by an E:cue lighting control. Glass for both façades were provided by Italian company Sunglass SRL, using Asahi Glass Co.'s Planibel Clear glass.

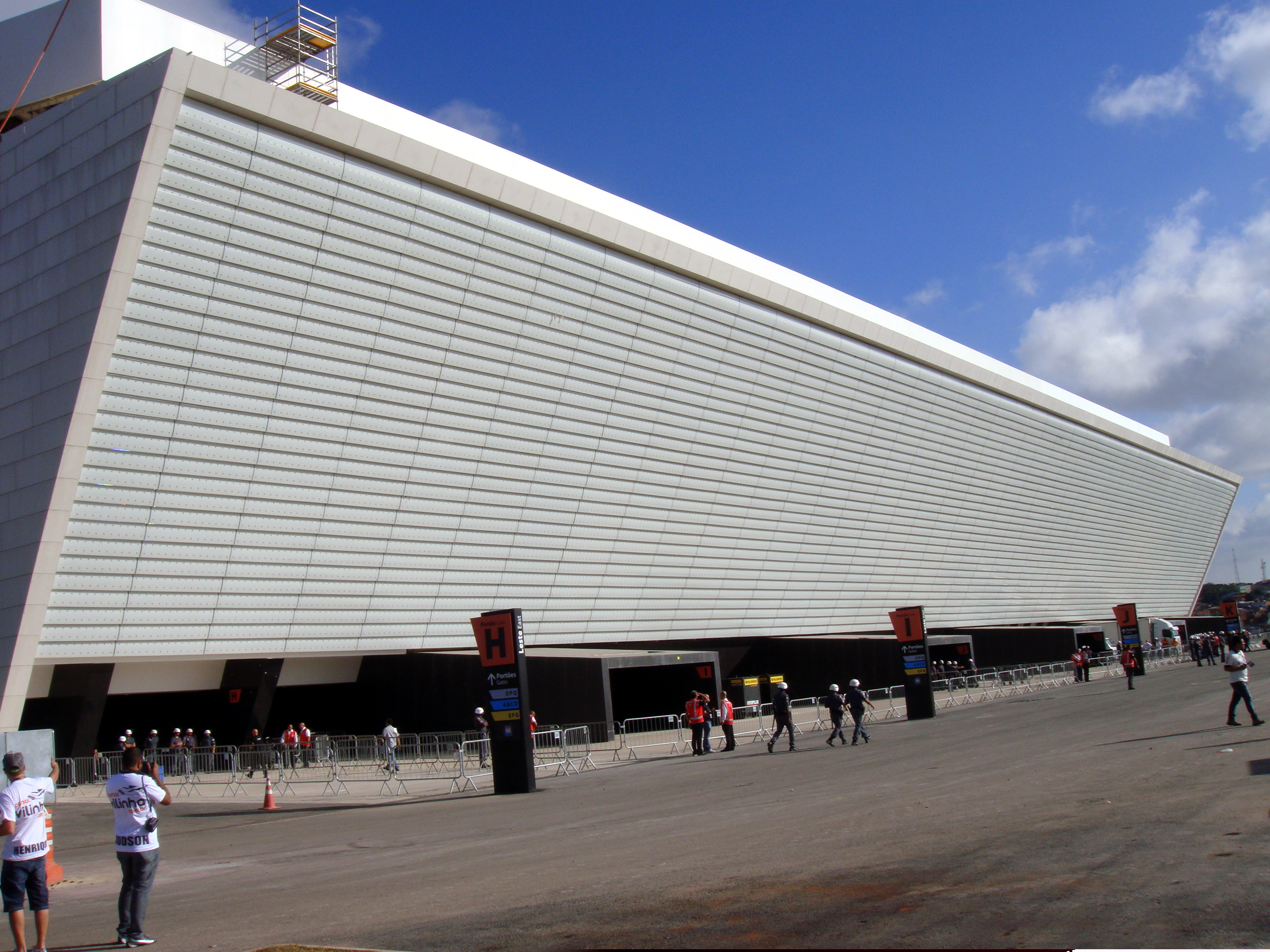
LED video screen on the east side

External walls are covered by 12,000 square metres (130,000 ft^{2}) of white Levantina Techlam ceramic tiles, A 12 metres (39 ft) Corinthians symbol, constructed from stainless steel and backlighting, will be mounted on the south wall of the east side.

The public circulates using 10 escalators, 15 lifts, two ramps and 13 staircases. 59 concession stands are available, as is an auditorium for 360 people and a 25,000 square metres (270,000 ft^{2}) convention center under the west building. A museum dedicated to Corinthians will be set up in the east building.

Interior design is designed by Gensler. There are six changing rooms. Home team changing rooms occupy 1,300 square metres (14,000 ft^{2}), with Jacuzzis, cryotherapy and a private area for the coach. The warm-up area has seating for 86 VIP ticket holders, and is separated by soundproof glass. All the public areas have air conditioning and are finished in marble, granite or top tier ceramic tile.

=== Seating ===
There are 49,205 seats. The stadium has 6,000 second tier covered seating and 10,000 VIP seats. 89 luxury boxes accommodate 1,414 spectators. Distributed on the West building's 5th and 6th floors, 87% have 12 seats, 10% between 21 and 33 seats and 4 units more than 70 seats. The largest units will cover more than 470 square metres (5,100 sq ft). The lowest ring of bleachers encircle the entire arena. It holds 10,500 seats on each side, 6,000 behind the south goal and 9,000 behind the north goal for a total of 35,000+ places.

The distance between the first row of seating and the field is 9 metres (30 ft) on all sides. General seating is provided by Bluecube^{3} using an exclusive design based on the Integra model. There are four different finishes, ranging from straight chairs without arms to stuffed chairs in leather. Most seats are white. Business level and box seats are finished in black leather and made by Poltrona Frau. The 600 seats have laser-engraved club crests.

=== Roof ===
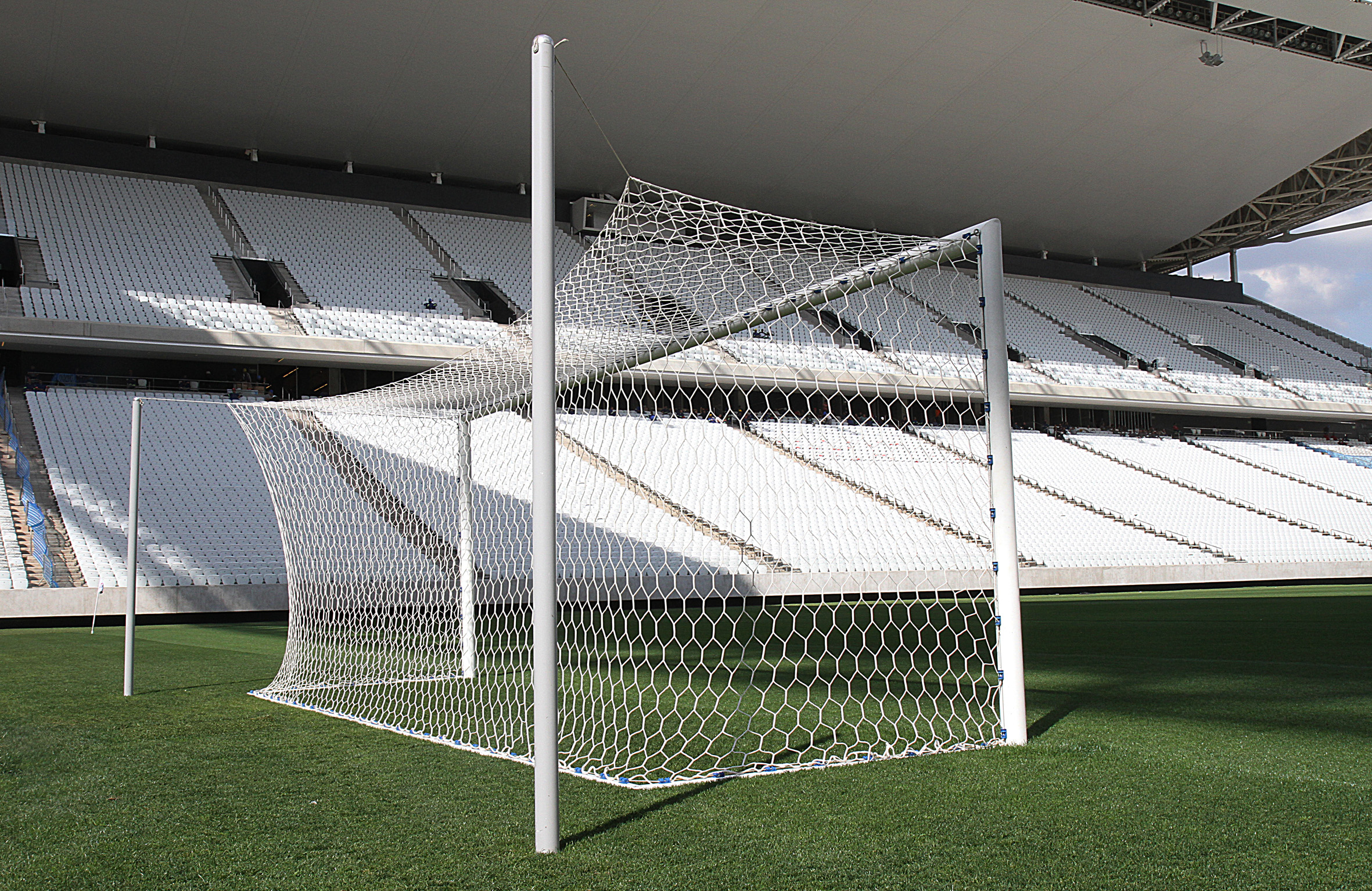
The underside of the roof is lined by a membrane

Werner Sobek designed the roof, which is held in place by 48 75 metres (246 ft)-long trusses. The west and east sides are joined by two identical structures that have a free span of 170 metres (560 ft). The total east–west roof length is 245.75 metres (806.3 ft). Aníbal Coutinho intended to bring a paulistano flair to the construction using structures that resemble the São Paulo Museum of Art, a symbol of the city. The height of the roof and weight of the trusses required the use of the largest crawler crane available in Latin America. The steel beams together weigh 4,000 tons.

The roof has four layers. On the underside is a layer of corrugated steel sheets. Above them, thermal and acoustic insulation is provided by Polyisocyanurate sheets. A layer of plasterboard is above it. Finally, the entire roof is covered with 40,000 square metres (430,000 ft^{2}) of Firestone Ultraply TPO. On the underside, a flexible membrane covers the structure. This final layer helps to collect rainwater for reuse in other areas of the stadium.

The structure was redesigned to duplicate the current noise level supporters create during games. Measurements taken on Pacaembu show that sound levels reach a peak of 113dB when goals are scored. 4,500 square metres (48,000 ft^{2}) of glass will be installed on the end closest to the pitch of the west and east roofing. The entire structure measures 32,300 square metres (348,000 ft^{2}) and weights 6,500 tons.

=== Scoreboards ===
Osram installed four scoreboards in the stadium, on the north and south ends, above the bleachers. They are set in pairs, with one facing the pitch and one facing outside. Each screen is 225 square metres (2,420 sq ft) and measures 30 by 7.5 metres (98 by 25 ft). The inside-facing screen has a 7mm dot pitch and the outside-facing screens will have a 20mm dot pitch. 3,500 flat panel televisions are installed throughout the stadium, individually or as video walls, comprising 3,100 stations.

=== Lighting ===
The pitch lighting is going to use 352 Osram Siteco 2000-Watt Metal-halide 6000K multivapour lamps, guaranteeing over 90% colour fidelity. The 5,000 lux lighting is completely uniform and is 50% brighter than FIFA's recommendation. Osram provides lighting for the entire complex.

=== Pitch ===
The field has recommended FIFA dimensions of 105 by 68 metres (115 by 74 yd). It was prepared by World Sports in partnership with Desso. The field is made up of Perennial Ryegrass, which is grown directly at the site. The original idea was to use black grass to avoid the colours of Palmeiras—Corinthians' biggest rivals—but it was proved to be technically impossible and the club chose to use grass with a darker hue. To improve fixation, the grass is intertwined with 22 million artificial fibres. Ultraviolet lights are used nightly to ensure that all parts of the pitch will receive equal lighting; the field is exposed to only two hours of direct sunlight per day.

World Sports uses a blend of three cultivars from DLF-Trifolium, Ph.D. Ryegrass Perenne, from Oregon, US. DLF states that this grass has strong cold and wear tolerance and is disease resistant, combined with fast growth rate. The hue is 8.7 on a scale of 1 to 9, where 9 is dark green. The choice of using ryegrass instead of the most common and usually recommended Bermuda brought advantages like having longitudinal roots, avoiding the cleats to tangle with them, and resistance to yellowing. It also brought challenges; ryegrass is native to cooler climates and needs temperatures of 23 °C (73 °F) for optimum growth. Because the temperature in São Paulo rarely falls below 14 °C (57 °F), a heating system is not used. A cooling system pushes cold water through 40,000 metres (130,000 ft) of drainage pipes, reducing the grass roots temperature to 6 °C (43 °F). The grass is mowed to between 2.2 centimetres (0.87 in) and 2.5 centimetres (0.98 in).

The drainage system has two operating modes; gravitational and vacuum-enhanced (Subair System). The vacuum draining system can handle up to 400,000 litres (88,000 imp gal) per hour, improving oxygen levels in the rooting system and cooling the pitch, even during matches. This is equivalent to 56 millimetres (2.2 in) of rain drained in one hour. The irrigation system has individual sprinkler controls, which are controlled by a computerised system. The system comprises 48 sprinklers—twice the minimum FIFA recommendation.

=== Information technology and communications ===
The stadium has wifi and 4G LTE in all its sectors. Spectators are able to access game statistics and watch replays that are published on a website maintained by the stadium crew. Supporters are monitored by hundreds of security cameras. All services are contracted with Sonda IT.

=== Hospitality and stores ===
There are for 75 bars—including 13 in the VIP areas—two restaurants and two sports bars in the stadium. All the restaurants and bars are managed by Diverti Arena on a 10-year contract. Diverti invested R$40 million in the stadium; all the properties were fully operational in 2015. Other commercial properties inside the stadium complex are two clothing stores.

== Reception ==
Average Série A attendances
Season	Stadium capacity	Average attendance	% of capacity	Ranking within SA
2019	49,205	32,856	66.8%	3rd highest
2018	49,205	31,367	63.7%	4th highest
2017	49,205	30,465	61.9%	1st highest
2016	49,205	28,795	58.5%	2nd highest
2015	49,205	34,256	69.6%	1st highest

The project received awards for the Best Commercial Project and the Grand Prize as the Best Overall Project in Brazil in the largest Corporate Architecture events in Latin America in 2011; it competed against 1,116 projects. Reception by Corinthians supporters was enthusiastic according to a poll, with 83% approval of the stadium. Opposition fans have good approval rates of the stadium. Hundreds of supporters frequently visited the construction site.

== Transport ==
The stadium is 19 kilometres (12 miles) east of the city centre and 21 kilometres (13 miles) away from the São Paulo–Guarulhos International Airport. The nearest subway station is Corinthians-Itaquera, 500 metres (550 yd) from the stadium. It connects to a railway station with the same name. The Artur Alvim subway station is 800 metres (2,600 ft) away. If all the stadium's users boarded trains to leave it, the stadium would be empty in 30 minutes. Created for World Cup matches, an express train connects Luz and the Corinthians-Itaquera CPTM Station, making the trip in 17 minutes. Because of its success, the service was extended to local matches, renamed to 'Expresso Corinthians'. The metro and train stations can accommodate 114,000 passengers per hour. Each metro train can carry 1,600 passengers; trains depart at 85-second intervals.

The site has 1,620 covered parking spaces and 929 open air parking spaces, with another 2,214 spaces provided by a shopping mall nearby. There are 61 bus routes that stop close to Arena Corinthians.

== Other uses ==
When the stadium first opened, Corinthians did not plan to host concerts or other sport events in the stadium because the use for non-football events could destroy the pitch and football ticket sales would compensate for the loss of revenue. However, the stadium has still hosted conventions, trade shows, and other events, taking advantage of the luxury boxes in the stadium to host events.

== In popular culture ==
EA Sports added all 12 venues used at the 2014 FIFA World Cup, including the Arena Corinthians, to the 2014 FIFA World Cup Brazil video game.

The Arena Corinthians is featured on "You Don't Have to Live Like a Referee", the sixteenth episode of the 25th season of the American animated sitcom The Simpsons, and the 546th episode of the series. Homer Simpson acts as a FIFA World Cup 2014 referee in a game played at Arena Corinthians.

The second episode of Discovery Channel's three-episode series Building the World Cup is dedicated to Arena Corinthians.

The Netflix show 3% used the stadium's marble halls and platforms as a shooting location.

== Controversies ==
The circumstances in which Arena Corinthians was chosen as the World Cup stadium for São Paulo, and the resources used for its construction, have been criticised.

=== World Cup hosts ===
Jose Serra, governor of São Paulo in 2007, planned to bring the opening game to his state—specifically to the Morumbi Stadium—as soon as Brazil was confirmed as the host nation of FIFA World Cup 2014. Mayor Gilberto Kassab supported the option of Morumbi and was assured that president Luiz Inácio Lula da Silva wanted the same. Unhappy with Morumbi, FIFA's secretary general Jérôme Valcke said the Morumbi Stadium could not host the opening game and was the worst among the 12 venues presented to FIFA. He recommended that the city should build a new stadium. FIFA technicians stated that the maximum capacity of the current structure would be 46,000 spectators—below the FIFA minimum of 60,000. São Paulo Futebol Clube's director João Paulo de Jesus Lopes said this was "a lie". FIFA's president Sepp Blatter stated that Morumbi could not host the opening game or semifinals without an extensive renovations plan.

The Morumbi Stadium failed to provide proof of funding for a R$630 million renovation plan requested by FIFA to secure its status as a World Cup venue; the stadium was then excluded from the tournament on 16 June 2010. The Local World Cup Committee suggested to use Arena Corinthians instead. FIFA accepted the suggestion and confirmed the decision on 10 October 2011. Journalist Wagner Vilaron from O Estado de S. Paulo deemed the exclusion of the Morumbi Stadium from the World Cup and the subsequent choice of Arena Corinthians as a venue for the event to be politically charged. After receiving several negative responses from FIFA about the renovation project for Morumbi, then-CBF-president Ricardo Teixeira lost patience with São Paulo Futebol Clube officers; he considered that they were delaying the decision by purposely failing to meet the requirements to force the government to spend money on the construction. São Paulo's opposition to Teixeira in the now defunct Clube dos 13 election—which was won by ruling-side Fábio Koff, aligned with São Paulo's Juvenal Juvêncio—irritated the CBF president. At the same time, an affinity between Teixeira and then-president of Corinthians, Andrés Sanchez—who was chosen as the head of delegation for the national team during the 2010 FIFA World Cup and on the same side on Clube dos 13's election—was noticed.

São Paulo's mayor Gilberto Kassab supported the selection of the Morumbi Stadium and guaranteed that president Luiz Inácio Lula da Silva wanted the same; he blamed FIFA for vetoing the selection. He said Corinthians could not influence FIFA and that CBF wanted Morumbi Stadium to host the opening game. The senior management of São Paulo F.C. criticised the chosen stadium and the selection process on numerous occasions after Morumbi Stadium was excluded from the World Cup. President Juvenal Juvencio said the region had no city structures, hospitals or hotels; the only way to enter or leave the area would be to use a fire engine and that there was no way to create a VIP area around the stadium. Juvenal blamed ex-governor José Serra for Morumbi Stadium's deselection. Serra denied the accusations.

Carlos Miguel Aidar, then a candidate for the SPFC presidency, said Arena Corinthians exists because Brazil's president demanded the construction of a new stadium in São Paulo; he also said Corinthians will never repay the loans for the stadium, that Odebrecht was the real owner, that FIFA and the Brazilian government only wanted to make money for construction companies, and that Itaquera was "another world, another country, nobody can get there". Later he visited the Arena by car, recanted his opinion and said the stadium was "marvelous" and could be reached easily.

=== Public funding allegations ===
Vinícius Segalla from UOL said tax credits and BNDES resources are public money and that the concession of those resources to Corinthians are unclear. The federal government dismissed the notion, saying that tax credits are intended to encourage economical growth and work opportunities for the areas surrounding the stadia. The city government said tax credits are not subsidies and the stadium will be a boon to the city, especially the east zone. They also said subsidies given to the Brazilian Grand Prix and Carnaval among others also bring benefits to the city. Public Prosecutor Marcelo Milani contested the validity of tax credits issued by the city and sued then-mayor Gilberto Kassab for R$1.74 billion; the judges said Milani's case was without merit and dismissed it.

=== Project changes ===
The project executed is not the project approved by the city council in 2011. Amendments were made to the final project, which was submitted on 25 July 2013 and approved on 13 February 2014.

=== Construction accidents ===
Two people were killed in an accident on 27 November 2013, which destroyed part of the east building. A crane fell while carrying a part of the roof, destroying eight columns of the LED screen and part of an internal slab. The structure was not affected because anti-vandalism glass was installed on the east façade. An area of 5,000 square metres (54,000 ft^{2}) was closed for investigation. Initial hypotheses were human error, crane mechanical failure and unstable ground under the crane. Liebherr said the crane's "black box" data recorder did not record anything on the day of the accident, although it should have.

As of August 2014, the case has not yet been concluded. Liebherr paid for a study from the Federal University of Rio de Janeiro, which concluded that the cause was unstable ground— the same conclusion reached by police experts; based on this, police indicted nine construction workers. Odebrecht refuted the conclusions, and showed a study by private company Geocompany as proof. Another report on the incident provided by IPT/University of São Paulo blamed the accident on the counterweights being heavier than what was specified on the rigging plan. Crane operations in the stadium were suspended at the time; all cranes on the site were inspected and approved to continue work 16 days later. The families of the deceased workers received R$2.9 million in compensation.

Another worker died in an accident on the site while working on the temporary seating. Local authorities' initial assessment was that the worker caused the accident by not following the required safety procedures. As of March 2014, an investigation into the death was underway.

== Average attendances ==
Tenants	League season	Home games	Average attendance
Corinthians	2024	19	43,612
Corinthians	2023	19	36,398
Corinthians	2022	19	39,088
Corinthians	2019	19	32,870
Corinthians	2018	19	31,052
Corinthians	2017	19	40,043
Corinthians	2016	19	28,791
Corinthians	2015	19	34,150
Corinthians	2014	19	29,195
Corinthians	2013	19	25,168
Corinthians	2012	19	25,498
Corinthians	2011	19	29,951
Corinthians	2010	19	28,269

== See also ==
- List of football stadiums in Brazil
- Lists of stadiums

Events and tenants
Preceded by Soccer City; Johannesburg	FIFA World Cup; Opening Venue; 2014	Succeeded by Luzhniki Stadium; Moscow
