= Death of Francisco Martínez =

The death of Francisco Martínez was a Chilean police incident in which the 27-year old street-juggler Francisco Martínez was shot to death by Chilean police forces in the southern city of Panguipulli. Various events of street demonstrations and episodes of violent rioting spread across the country of Chile after the event.

== Biography ==
Francisco Martínez
- Born: Francisco Andrés Martínez Romero; August 7, 1993; Puente Alto, Chile
- Died: February 5, 2021 (aged 27); Panguipulli, Chile
- Cause of death: Gunshot wound
- Occupation: Street artist

Francisco Andrés Martínez Romero (August 7, 1993 – February 5, 2021) was 27 years old at the time of his death. His family lived in the Puente Alto commune, in Santiago, a city which he left at 18 years of age in order to live in various Latin American countries.

In 2015, he settled in Panguipulli, living on the streets and working as a street artist, juggler and craftsman. In that city he was known as "Franco" or "Tibet", and participated in the mobilizations of the 2019–2020 Chilean protests.

According to the testimony of his sister, Francisco had schizophrenia. He was the uncle of a minor who was also involved in an episode of police brutality caused by the Carabineros on the Pío Nono Bridge in Santiago, also within the context of the 2019–2020 protests.

=== Death ===
After 3:00 p.m. on Friday, February 5, 2021, in the city of Panguipulli, southern Chile, Francisco Martínez was juggling with machetes at the busy intersection of Martínez de Rozas and Pedro de Valdivia streets. At the scene, a group of three Carabineros stopped him to carry out an identity check.

According to police testimony, Martínez said that he did not have an identification card but that he knew his tax identification number. When Second Sergeant Juan Guillermo González Iturriaga asked Martínez accompany him to the police station, Martínez reportedly grew agitated and lunged at the officers with the machetes he had been carrying. González then fired several shots at Martínez at point-blank range, killing him.

A nursing technician who was at the scene gave Martinez first aid and unsuccessfully performed cardiopulmonary resuscitation.

== Reaction ==
Martinez's death was recorded by a passerby and the video was broadcast through social media. The event generated several spontaneous protests in the main streets of Panguipulli during the afternoon of February 5. The demonstrations led to incidents during the night, with the Municipality of Panguipulli being completely burned down. Other buildings affected were the Chilean Post Office, the Local Police Court, the Civil Registry, and the ESSAL office. The protests ended with five people arrested. Rioting plagued the main streets of other cities as the manifestations entered its second day, with clashes with police becoming a frequent occurrence in Santiago.

On February 6, Martínez's body left the Panguipulli Medical Legal Service for Santiago, being honored by the local community. During that day, protests also took place in other cities of Chile, such as Antofagasta, Santiago, Concepción, Temuco and Valdivia.

On the morning of February 7, Martínez's remains arrived in Bajos de Mena, Puente Alto commune, for his wake, which was attended by the singer Roberto Márquez, 16. His funeral was held the next day in the Parque El Prado cemetery. On February 8, protests over Martínez's death were also held in various cities in Chile, including Santiago, Valparaíso, and La Serena.

Left-wing politicians Gabriel Boric, Camila Vallejo and Nicolás Grau all condemned the death as murder in social media.

In February 2022 the Supreme Court of Chile dismissed the case against the involved police officer and ratified the previous ruling of the Court of Valdivia that established he acted in legitimate self-defense.

== See also ==
- 2019–2021 Chilean protests
