= Inversiones Aguas Metropolitanas =

Inversiones Águas Metropolitanas S.A.
- Company type: Sociedad Anónima
- Traded as: BCS: IAM
- Industry: Water & Wastewater
- Headquarters: Santiago, Chile
- Key people: Angel Simon Grimaldo, (Chairman); Marta Colet Gonzalo, (CEO)
- Products: Water supply & Wastewater treatment
- Revenue: ▲US$ 754.7 million (2012)
- Net income: ▲US$ 114.4 million (2012)
- Number of employees: 1,809
- Parent: Grupo Agbar
- Subsidiaries: Aguas Andinas; ESSAL
- Website: https://www.iam.cl/en

Inversiones Aguas Metropolitanas (IAM) is the controlling holding of Aguas Andinas through a shareholding of 50.1% in this company. Aguas Andinas and its subsidiaries are the largest sanitation group in Chile and one of the largest in Latin America.

IAM’s subsidiaries manage the integral water cycle, which implies operating the abstraction processes of raw water, the production, transportation, and distribution of water, and the collection, treatment, and final disposal of sewage. It provides sanitation services to close to six million residents of the Metropolitan Region, covering an area of more than 70 thousand hectares corresponding to its concession zone.

Subsidiaries claim coverage levels which reach 100% in the supply of water and 98% in sewage. Also, they treat more than 72% of the sewage generated in its concession zone.

The Company’s operations have the support of its controlling shareholder, Agbar, the principal Spanish private-sector company for supplying water to households.

The sanitation subsidiaries of IAM are Aguas Andinas, Aguas Cordillera, Aguas Los Dominicos and Aguas Manquehue. Its nonregulated subsidiaries are EcoRiles, Gestión y Servicios and Anam, companies related to the sanitation industry and which provide it with an integral service.
