= Chapiquiña =

Coordinates: 18°23′41″S 69°32′13″W

- Village
- Interactive map of Chapiquiña
- Country: Chile
- Region: Arica and Parinacota Region

Chapiquiña is a village in the Arica and Parinacota Region, Chile. According to informants, the 2002 census registers 38 people residing in Chapiquiña.

== See also ==
- Chapiquiña power plant
