= Socovesa =

Socovesa S.A.
- Company type: Public (IPSA: SOCOVESA)
- Industry: Real estate and construction
- Founded: 1965 (current name since 1967)
- Headquarters: Santiago, Chile
- Key people: Eduardo Gras Díaz (Chairman); Cristián Hartwig (CEO)
- Products: Properties
- Revenue: ▲US$488.1 million (2010)
- Website: www.socovesa.cl

Socovesa operates as a real estate and construction company in Chile. The company develops housing units and housing works, corporate buildings, malls, and offices, among others.

Socovesa was founded in 1965 and is based in Santiago.

== Background ==
The company was founded in Temuco in 1965, with a small backlog of 16 homes. In 1982, amid the economic crisis of that year, operations moved to Santiago, where its expansion began. Currently Socovesa has a presence in most of Chile, from Antofagasta to Punta Arenas. It has subsidiaries in the real estate hotspots of Chile, specifically the Regional Valdivia (Valdivia, the Union, Osorno, Puerto Varas, Puerto Montt, Coyhaique, Punta Arenas), Regional Temuco, Regional Santiago, Almagro, and Empresa Pillars (dedicated to social housing). Socovesa additionally has foundations in the engineering and construction firm Socoicsa.
