= Chapiquiña Power Plant =

Hydroelectric power station in Chile

- Scheme of the rivers in Arica y Parinacota, with Canal Lauca highlighted; the plant lies at the south-west end of the canal
- Official name: Central Hidroeléctrica Chapiquiña
- Country: Chile
- Location: Arica y Parinacota Region
- Coordinates: 18°22′22.8″S 69°33′18″W
- Status: Active
- Construction began: 1962
- Commission date: 1967
- Owner: E-CL
- Operator: Engie Energía Chile

Power generation
- Units operational: 2
- Nameplate capacity: 10.2 MW
- Annual net output: 44 GW·h

Chapiquiña power plant is a hydroelectric power plant in northern Chile. It takes water from the Canal Lauca and produces electrical power through a Pelton turbine.

== Structure ==
External image
- Chapiquiña power plant
- 1969 photo of the power plant

It lies 120 kilometres (75 mi) east of Arica, in the Putre commune of the Arica y Parinacota Region. The plant lies at an elevation of 3,300 metres (10,800 ft); the town of Chapiquiña lies south of the plant. The name Chapiquiña is derived from Aymara ch`apikiña and means "bed of thorns".

Water is carried by the 28 kilometres (17 mi) long Canal Lauca to the plant and drops over a distance of 1,008 metres (3,307 ft) to produce electrical power through two 5.1 megawatt Pelton turbines. The water is held in a reservoir after exiting the plant before being discharged into the Quebrada Cosapilla; from there it flows into the Rio Seco and eventually into the San José River. The maximum flow capacity of the plant is 137 cubic metres per second (4,800 cu ft/s) while the capacity of the feeder Canal Lauca is only 2,750 litres per second (97 cu ft/s) and a more typical flow rate is 670 litres per second (24 cu ft/s); most of the water in the San José River comes from the Chapiquiña power plant. There is also a rain gauging station at Chapiquiña.

== Operation ==
Chapiquiña produces about 10.2 megawatt of power (Note: Such high power production is only possible with a minimum flow of 1.2 cubic metres per second (42 cu ft/s) and thus does not occur during low flow periods.) which is injected into the Sistema Interconectado del Norte Grande, the regional power grid, through the Águila substation farther west. In 2013 the plant generated almost 44 GWh. It operates mainly when power consumption is high and is one of the few hydroelectric power plants in northern Chile.

Aside from producing electrical power, the water discharged into the San Jose River is intercepted downriver and used to irrigate the Azapa Valley; the reservoir downstream of the turbines serves to secure water delivery even when water is low in the Canal Lauca.

Operating principle of a Pelton turbine

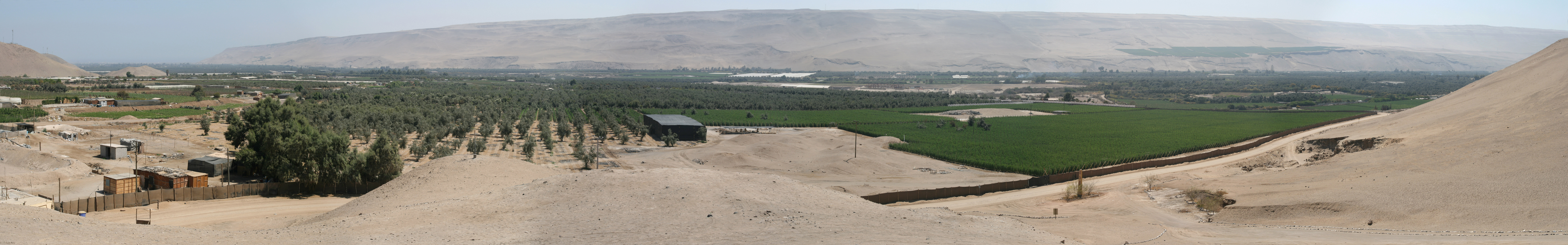
The Azapa Valley close to Arica

== History ==
Studies on the possibility to use the Lauca River as a water source for the Azapa Valley were made after 1945; during planning of the diversion the idea rose to use the drop at Chapiquiña for hydropower generation. Construction of the plant was started by the company ENDESA in 1962 and operations commenced in March 1967. Until 2017, it was the largest public works project in the Arica y Parinacota Region; the construction of the power plant was part of a series of public work projects in the 1960s–1970s in the Arica region. The plant underwent a number of ownership changes after it was built; it is currently owned by the company E-CL.

It was also planned to augment the water supply to the plant by pumping water from Lake Chungara, but in 1985 the Supreme Court of Chile disallowed such pumping for environmental reasons as Lake Chungara is located in the Lauca National Park. In 2012, the Spanish ambassador Iñigo de Palacio visited the plant; in the same year quenoa woodlands began to be planted in initially about 2 hectares (4.9 acres) land owned by the plant as a conservation measure. Such trees provide nesting sites for birds and regulate the local water balance.
