= Courtney Kingston =

American winemaker

- Education: Princeton University; Stanford University Graduate School of Business
- Occupation: Winemaker
- Years active: 1998 - present
- Known for: Kingston Family Vineyards

Courtney Kingston is an American winemaker and entrepreneur whose work to pivot her family's Chilean dairy farm to growing wine is taught through case studies at Stanford Graduate School of Business. Her company, Kingston Family Vineyards has been called one of the best wineries in Chile.

== Personal life and education ==
Kingston grew up in Princeton, New Jersey and attended Princeton University for her undergraduate education. Her college thesis for her degree in Latin American studies was titled “A Crisis of Justice – Civil Liberties under the Pinochet Regime and during the Democratic Transition.”

After college, Kingston moved to San Francisco and worked at Deloitte & Touche as a consultant for California wineries. She then attended the Stanford Graduate School of Business for an MBA, graduating in 1997. After graduate school, she and her husband worked in the technology industry in San Francisco.

Kingston and her husband Andrew Pflaum have three daughters, and split time between Portola Valley, California, and Chile’s Casablanca Valley.

== Career ==
In 1994, Kingston and her siblings began discussing whether the 7,500-acre cattle ranch in Valparaiso, Chile where their father grew up could grow wine. Kingston was a management consultant for some California wineries at the time, and understood the potential. While pursuing an MBA at Stanford, she had a business plan about planting a vineyard in the Casablanca Valley, zone known to be a wine-producing region of Chile. The cattle farm's profits were subject to the whims of commodity pricing swings, but wine could have more growth potential.

In 1996, the family launched Kingston Family Vineyards with Kingston as CEO and lead for sales and marketing, with her brother Tim advising as a founding partner. Kingston's decision to grow pinot noir and syrah grapes proved important, despite the region not being known for this type of grape. All their vines are farmed organically and planted on their own roots.

While the Chilean wine industry has been dominated by large global producers, Kingston Family Vineyards is one of a handful of Chilean vineyards leveraging California-style winemaking to spotlight Chilean terroir.

In 2003, the Kingston Family label produced 450 cases. In 2025, the winery produced 5000 cases.

Stanford has published two case studies about Kingston Family Vineyards.
