= Oro Blanco =

Sociedad de Inversiones Oro Blanco S.A.
- Company type: Sociedad Anónima
- Traded as: BCS: ORO BLANCO
- Industry: Holding
- Founded: 1983
- Headquarters: Santiago, Chile
- Key people: Julio Ponce Lerou, (Chairman); Aldo Motta Camp, (CEO)
- Products: Investment
- Revenue: ▼US$ 5.0 million (2011)
- Net income: ▲US$ 323.0 million (2011)
- Parent: Norte Grande
- Subsidiaries: Calichera

Oro Blanco ( BCS: ORO BLANCO) is an investment company based in Chile. Through its 83.23%-owned subsidiary Calichera, the company holds interests in the Chilean Chemical company SQM. The company's majority shareholder is Norte Grande, with 86.1% of its interests.

According to the fact finding website, "snopes.com". The claims made by Oro Blanco, through a viral marketing advertisement created by Kent Moors, are fraudulent The 'superfuel' turns out to be lithium, which is mined as the mineral lithium carbonate. Purified lithium is used in lithium-ion batteries (which include the batteries that power electric cars), though the advertisement persistently omits to mention the word "lithium".
