= Canal Lauca =

Canal in Chile

Coordinates: 18°18′S 69°21′W

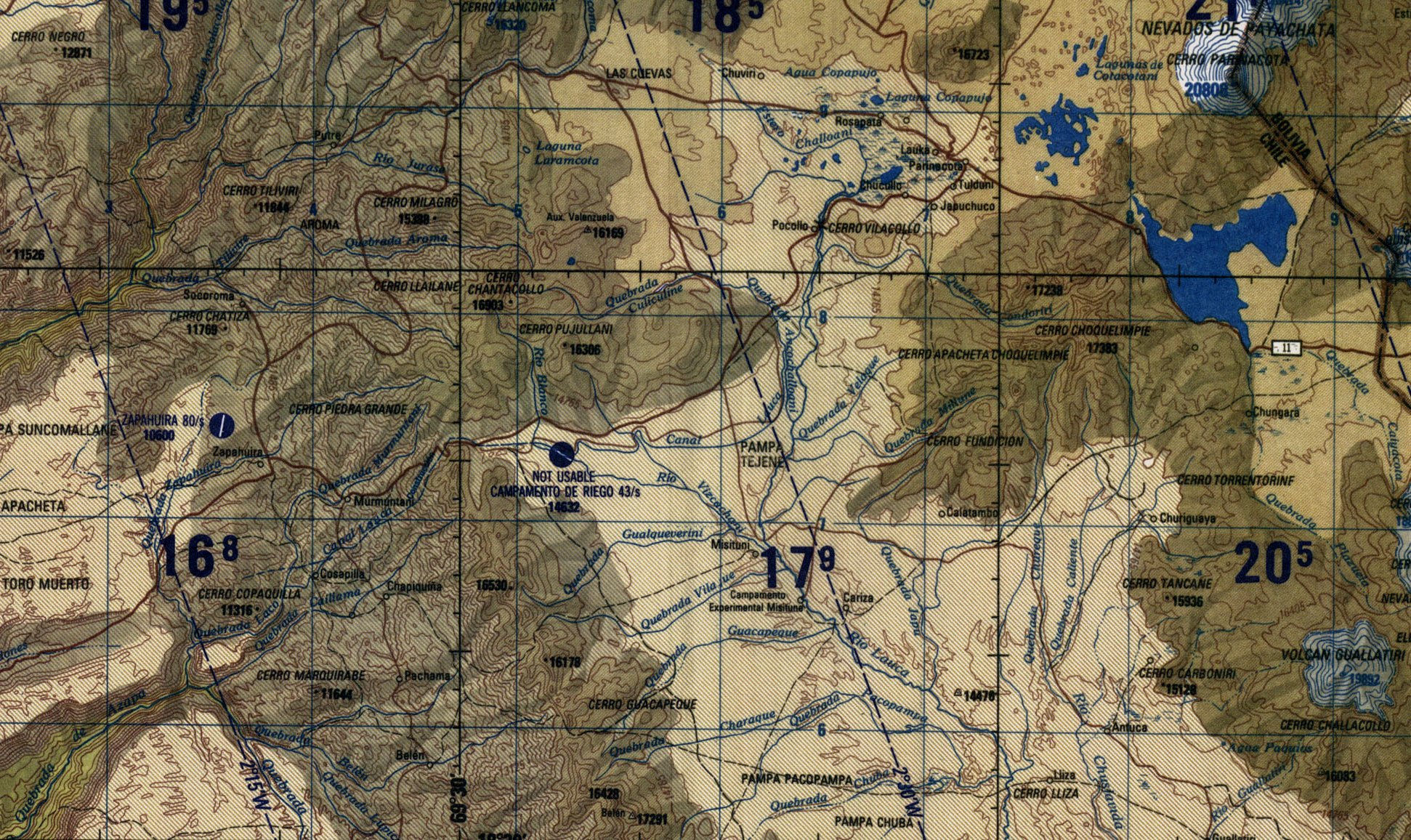
Canal Lauca

The Canal Lauca is an artificial channel to divert the waters of the Lauca River westward through a canal and tunnel into the Azapa Valley for purposes of irrigation in the valley and hydroelectric-power generation. Its construction began 1948 and water diversion began 14 years later from a dam located about 16 miles southwest of Lago Cotacotani Lake.

The canal lies in the commune of Putre in the Arica y Parinacota Region of Chile. It is 33 kilometres (21 mi) long and has a capacity of 1.9 cubic metres per second (67 cu ft/s). It transfers water from the Lauca River into the Rio San Jose for irrigation and hydropower purposes; the endpoint of the canal includes the Chapiquiña power plant which produces 56 gigawatt-hours per year (6.4 MW). Typically about 0.8 cubic metres per second (28 cu ft/s) are transferred; a plan to transfer additional water from Lake Chungara was blocked after litigation by an environmentalist group.

The canal was put into service in 1962 and is owned by the government of Chile. As a consequence of the construction of the canal, the surface of irrigated land in the Azapa valley increased. This also led to increased immigration from Bolivia into Chile. The construction of the canal led to protests by Bolivians and appears to have primarily favoured large agribusiness.

The Lauca River originates at the Laguna Cotacotani, which in turn receives seepage water from Lake Chungara. It first flows due westward before turning south and later back east into Bolivia. After draining a watershed of 2,350 square kilometres (910 sq mi), the river ends in the Salar de Coipasa of Bolivia.

== See also ==
- Bolivian Chile Boundary
- Canal Lauca
