= Pilmaiquén S.A. =

Chile-based investment company

Empresa Eléctrica Pilmaiquén S.A
- Company type: Sociedad Anónima
- Traded as: BCS: PILMAIQUEN
- Industry: Electricity
- Founded: 1986
- Headquarters: Santiago, Chile
- Key people: Francisco Javier Courbis Grez, (Chairman); Alejandro Artus Bórquez, (CEO)
- Products: Financial services Beverages and food Manufacturing; Energy; Transport
- Net income: ▲US$4.3 million (2011)
- Number of employees: 16,555
- Website: www.epilmaiquen.cl

Pilmaiquén is a Chile-based investment company engaged in the generation, transmission and distribution of hydroelectric energy. The company was founded in 1986 as an investment company called Inversiones I.M.S.A. and in the same year the company acquired from Endesa, a 99.73% stake in the ownership of Empresa Hidroeléctrica Pilmaiquén S.A and in 1987 the company changed its name to Empresa Eléctrica Pilmaiquén.

== History ==
On December 21, 1999, after a competitive bidding process, the Company proceeded to the sale of its main asset: Pilmaiquén power plant. Since then Empresa Eléctrica Pilmaiquén S.A. is operating as an investment company. Subsequently, and together with the management of its financial investments overseas, the Company has continued the development of the legal permits, engineering, and environmental studies of several hydroelectric power projects, especially Rucatayo project, which is being developed through its subsidiary Hidroeléctricas del Sur S.A.

After the sale of Pilmaiquén power plant, Empresa Eléctrica Pilmaiquén S.A., ceased its operations in the energy market, which had been held for more than a decade. Since January 1, 2000, the main assets of the company are financial instruments, so today it trades in the financial market. Nevertheless, it maintains property of non-consumptive water rights and is developing studies for the possible use of these rights in new hydroelectric power plants.

After the sale of the Pilmaiquén power plant in 1999, the company no longer trades in the energy market. Therefore, it neither generates nor sells electric energy. Currently the suppliers are reduced to those that are related to the management and maintenance of the offices of the company and whose movements are to cover the expenses generated by the administration and operation of the organization. Additionally, there exist contracts with engineering and other consultants for the development of new projects in the area of hydropower.
