= Calichera =

Sociedad de Inversiones Pampa Calichera S.A.
- Company type: Public (IPSA:CALICHERAA)
- Industry: Investment
- Founded: (2003)
- Headquarters: Santiago, Chile
- Key people: Julio Ponce Lerou (Chairman); Aldo Motta Camp(CEO)
- Products: Assets; Securities
- Revenue: ▼US$ 2.1 billion (2008)
- Subsidiaries: SQM

Pampa Calichera (IPSA:CALICHERAA) is a Chile-based investment company.

The company is a major shareholder of SQM.
