= Banmédica =

Health insurance company

Empresas Banmédica S.A.
- Type: Holding
- Traded as: BCS: BANMEDICA
- Industry: Health
- Founded: 1988
- Headquarters: Santiago, Chile
- Key people: Gonzalo Ibáñez Langlois (Chairman); Carlos Kubik Castro (CEO)
- Products: Hospitals; Clinics; Health insurance
- Revenue: ▲US$ 1.0 Billion (2008)
- Website: www.empresasbanmedica.cl

Banmédica is a private health insurance company from Chile.
