= Vigatec (Chile) =

Chilean corporation

- Type: Corporation
- Industry: Office equipment
- Founded: 1980
- Headquarters: Santiago, Chile
- Products: Plastic Cards, Mail Handling Equipment, etc.
- Revenue: ▲ S/. ? million (2006)
- Net income: ▼ S/. ? million (2006)
- Website: https://web.archive.org/web/20060901194139/http://www.vigatec.cl:80/

Vigatec is a Chilean corporation founded in 1980. The company headquarters is in Santiago de Chile, and it has subsidiaries in Ecuador, Bolivia and Brazil. Vigatec currently has about 200 employees.

Vigatec has several products and services:

- The reselling and marketing of various types of plastic cards (like: ATM cards, various credit cards, phone cards, loyalty program cards, etc.).
- Mail handling equipment.
- Control & security systems.
- Packaging equipment.

In Chile, Vigatec is the exclusive reseller of the following brands: Datacard, Pitney Bowes, Kyocera Mita, Rexel, Tempo, Mach, Linear, Synel, Secom, and Thermo Electron.

== History ==
Vigatec was founded in 1980 as a division of Vigamil, a paper envelope manufacturing company.

In 1991, Vigatec started selling products for attendance & access control.

In 1999 the company started selling security products (alarms, CCTV equipment)

== Labor oriented initiatives ==
Vigatec has initiated several labor environment improvement projects:

- The Second generation plan is a summer work program directed at the children (between 14 and 18 years of age) of the employees.
- Vigatec is willing to pay, for children of the employees, the registration and monthly costs of studies in the pre-university institute of the Catholic University in San Joaquín.
- An Internet for all program which means that in the summer months there is a special room with computers connected to the Internet, so the employees, with or without their children, could use them to for their personal interests.
- A Vocational & professional orientation program to help the children of their employees to explore their motivations and interests
