= Kingston Family Vineyards =

- Location: Casablanca, Chile
- Appellation: Casablanca
- Key people: Courtney Kingston, General Manager; Byron Kosuge, Winemaking - B Kosuge Wines; Amael Orrego, Winemaking; David Gates, Vineyard Operations
- Known for: Alazan Pinot noir
- Varietals: Pinot noir, Syrah, Sauvignon blanc, Chardonnay
- Website: www.kingstonvineyards.com

Kingston Family Vineyards is a Chilean winery located in the Casablanca Valley of Chile. Considered pioneers for growing red wine grapes in a valley known for whites, they have been called "one of the area’s most promising producers". The vineyard was founded in the early 1990s by the Kingston Family.

== History ==
Although Kingston Family Vineyards was established in the early 1990s, the land upon which it was built has a much longer history. Founded by the family's patriarch, C.J. Kingston, a copper miner from the Upper Peninsula of Michigan who was drawn to Chile in a search for gold in the early 1900s. Unable to find gold, Kingston was left with a simple 7,500 acre farm in the Casablanca Valley of Chile, located between the city of Santiago and the oceanside city of Valparaíso. Since then the ranch has been owned by Kingston descendants who set up a cattle ranch and dairy.

Though still a working cattle farm and dairy, much of the ranch's land has been re-devoted to grape growing as a result of Courtney, Tim, and Michael Kingston who founded the winery. It was Courtney Kingston, the great-great-granddaughter of CJ Kingston who formulated the idea to plant vineyards on the land and sell the grapes to the wineries in the region while in business school at Stanford University. After discovering that the wineries in the region did not know how to work with Pinot noir grapes, they decided to produce the wines themselves. They consulted several winemakers and eventually partnered with Byron Kosuge, a winemaker from California and Evelyn Vidal, an up-and-coming female winemaker from Chile.

== Wines ==
Though Kingston Family Vineyards focuses on red wines, such as Syrah and Pinot noir, it has also makes Sauvignon blanc and Chardonnay. All their wines are named for family horses of years past.

== Vineyards ==
Specializing in small-production Pinot noir, Syrah, Sauvignon blanc and Chardonnay from some of Casablanca's westernmost vineyards, their vineyards grow on "hillsides of red clay loam and decomposed granite, and benefit from a coastal climate cooler than eastern Casablanca."

== Winemaking ==
The winemaking process at Kingston is overseen by winemakers Amael Orrego and consulting winemaker Byron Kosuge and they use 15 percent of the vineyards grapes to produce just 5,000 cases a year. To make each wine, individual lots are selected and combined to create 4 different types of wine all single varietal. The rest of the grapes which Kingston Family Vineyards grows are sold to other Chilean wineries.

== Awards ==
- A 2011 Winery of the Year by Wine & Spirits Magazine
- 2010 Value Brand of the Year by Wine & Spirits Magazine
- Decanter World Wine Awards - Gold medal, silver medals, bronze medals, regional medal

== See also ==
Chilean wine
