= Cono Sur Vineyards & Winery =

Viña Cono Sur
- Location: Chile
- Founded: 1993 (31–32 years ago)
- Parent company: Concha y Toro Company
- Website: conosur.com

Cono Sur Vineyards & Winery is a subsidiary of Concha y Toro Winery and is the third largest exporter of bottled wine in Chile. Established in 1993, its name is a reference to its location in the Southern Cone of South America and a play on the word connoisseur. In 2015, it was the official wine of the Tour de France.

== Pinot noir project ==
In 1999, Cono Sur launched the "Pinot noir project" with the aim of producing Pinot Noir wine using traditional methods from the Burgundy region of France, where the variety originated. The winery sought the guidance of Martin Prieur, a seasoned Pinot Noir winemaker from Burgundy, in selecting the appropriate terroirs in Chile and optimizing vineyard management practices.

=== Sustainable agriculture ===
In 1998, Cono Sur began transitioning from traditional to sustainable agriculture, a system that favors the use of natural alternatives to fertilize, prevent and control pests, diseases and weeds. The idea was to avoid the use of non-natural substances as much as possible and rather use geese, sheep, insects and plants.

=== Organic agriculture ===
An organic wine is a wine made from organically grown grapes, meaning they were farmed and harvested entirely without the use of man-made chemicals, whether in the form of fertilizers, pesticides, herbicides, insecticides or fungicides. For some years now, Cono Sur has promoted the production of organic wine in Chile.

In 1999, Cono Sur began its organic viticulture project with 40 hectares (99 acres) of Chimbarongo vineyards in the Colchagua Valley. In 2003, after the necessary three-year transition period, it produced its first wine – a Cabernet Sauvignon / Carménère – made from organically grown grapes, certified by BCS Oeko Garantie GMBH Germany. In 2009, the three varieties that were part of the sustainable agriculture range (Sauvignon blanc, Chardonnay and Pinot noir) became part of Cono Sur's organic wine range, after obtaining the organic certification.

== Vineyards ==
Cono Sur has vineyards in several valleys along the country:

Limarí Valley (Chardonnay, Viognier, Carmenere, Syrah).

Aconcagua Valley (Chardonnay, Pinot noir, Merlot, Cabernet Sauvignon.)

Casablanca Valley (Sauvignon blanc, Chardonnay, Gewürztraminner, Pinot noir, Merlot.)

San Antonio Valley (Sauvignon blanc, Chardonnay, Pinot noir, Merlot, Syrah.)

Maipo Valley (Pinot noir, Syrah, Cabernet Sauvignon.)

Cachapoal Valley (Riesling, Merlot, Malbec, Carmenere, Syrah, Cabernet Sauvignon, Cabernet Sauvignon).

Colchagua Valley (Sauvignon blanc, Chardonnay, Viognier, Gewürztraminer, Pinot noir, Merlot, Malbec, Carmenere, Syrah, Cabernet Sauvignon).

Curicó Valley (Sauvignon blanc, Chardonnay, Viognier, Pinot noir, Malbec.)

Maule Valley (Sauvignon blanc, Chardonnay, Riesling, Viognier, Pinot noir, Merlot, Carmenere, Syrah, Cabernet Sauvignon.)

Bío-Bío Valley (Sauvignon blanc, Chardonnay, Riesling, Gewürztraminer, Pinot noir.)

== Winery ==
Cono Sur's main winery is located in Chimbarongo, in Colchagua Valley.

In 1999, Cono Sur inaugurated an annex winery especially designed for the vinification of Pinot noir, where the ancient Burgundian winemaking traditions blend with New World forefront technology. In 2009, another 530,000-litre capacity cellar was built, which will be exclusively for premium Pinot noir wines.

== Other brands ==
Cono Sur also produces the brand Isla Negra Wines, which is mainly exported to Europe.
