= Compañia General de Electricidad =

Chilean utility company

Compañia General de Electricidad S.A.
- Company type: Sociedad Anónima
- Traded as: BCS: CGE
- Industry: Utilities
- Founded: 1905
- Headquarters: Santiago, Chile
- Key people: Jorge Eduardo Marín Correa, (Chairman); Pablo Guarda Barros, (CEO)
- Products: Electricity; Natural gas among others
- Revenue: ▲US$ 4.4 billion (2011)
- Net income: ▼ - US$ 27.2 million(2011)
- Number of employees: 7,880
- Website: www.cgeboleta.cl

CGE is a utility company based in Chile, operates in the sectors of electricity, natural gas and other services and is listed on the Santiago Stock Exchange.
