= SM-Chile =

Sociedad Matriz del Banco de Chile S.A.
- Type: Sociedad Anónima
- Traded as: BCS: SM-CHILE A, SM-CHILE B, SM-CHILE D, SM-CHILE E
- Industry: Holding
- Founded: 1996
- Headquarters: Santiago, Chile
- Key people: Andrónico Luksic Craig, (Chairman); Arturo Tagle Quiroz, (CEO)
- Products: Financial services
- Revenue: ▲US$ 2.4 billion (2012)
- Net income: ▼US$ 153.8 million (2012)
- Total assets: ▲US$ 48.4 billion (2012)
- Parent: Banco de Chile
- Website: www.sm-chile.cl

SM-Chile is a holding company for Banco de Chile. Until 1996, when its Board of Shareholders agreed to become an investment company with exclusive turn, governed by Law No. 19,396, changing its name to Bank of Parent Company Chile SA' Simultaneously, the parent company of Banco de Chile SA created a commercial bank under the name Banco de Chile and was transferred all its assets and liabilities, excluding subordinated obligation call with the Central Bank of Chile, obligation undertaken following the banking crisis of the years 1982 - 1984 and the consequent bailout carried out by the Central Bank. After this transformation, the sole shareholder of Banco de Chile was the parent company of Banco de Chile SA

From 1996 to 2008, the parent company of Banco de Chile has reduced its participation in Banco de Chile, the proceeds of redemption of shares of Series E of the capitalization of profits of the Bank, the merger of Banco de Chile, from January 2002 merger with Citibank Chile, from January 2008.

At December 2015, SM-Chile owns directly the 42.38% of Banco de Chile (12.63% directly and 29.7% though its subsidiary management company of the Subordinated Obligation SAOS SA).

The ownership of the Company is divided into four sets of actions: A, B, D and E. The Company's shares are traded on the Stock Exchange of Chile, the Chilean Electronic Stock Exchange and the Valparaíso Stock Exchange.

The parent company of Banco de Chile is monitored by the Superintendency of Banks and Financial Institutions of Chile.
