= Masisa =

MASIZA S.A.
- Company type: Sociedad Anónima
- Traded as: BCS: MASISA
- Industry: Wood products
- Founded: 1920
- Headquarters: Santiago, Chile
- Key people: Jorge Carey Tagle, (Chairman); Roberto Salas Guzman, (CEO)
- Products: Panels doors wood boards
- Revenue: ▲US$ 1.2 billion (2011)
- Net income: ▼US$ 69.9 million (2011)
- Website: www.masisa.com

MASISA S.A. (BCS: MASISA) is a wood products' company headquartered in Chile with manufacturing operations in Chile, Argentina, Peru, Brazil, Venezuela, Mexico and the United States. Its manufactured products include solid wood, particleboard, medium-density fibreboard (MDF) and oriented strand board (OSB), as well as interior doors, mouldings and millwork. The company is currently the second-largest company of its sector, after Brazilian meu furebs Duratex.
