= AmnesiaGames =

Chilean video game developer

- Type: Privately held company
- Industry: Video games
- Founded: March 16, 2006
- Headquarters: Santiago, Chile
- Key people: Alejandro Woywood, CEO; Francisco Alcántara, Lead Developer
- Products: Ninja Joe; 31 minutos
- Website: http://www.AmnesiaGames.cl/

AmnesiaGames is an independent video game developer based in Santiago, Chile founded in 2006 in Santiago, Chile. The company creates multi-platform games and applications for Smartphones, Tablets and the Web.

== History ==
AmnesiaGames was founded in 2006 by Alejandro Woywood, who was the teacher of the course “Creation of Videogames” at the Pontificia Universidad Catolica de Chile (still teaching it). The first employees of the company were the top students of this course.

Early on, the company made games for mobiles phones using technologies like J2ME, SMS and WML. The company grew organically making games for third parties, including foreign game developers and national mobile operators like ENTEL and CLARO CHILE.

In 2010 AmnesiaGames won a regional contest from Nokia, with its game “Ninja Joe”. The game was available for J2ME (JAVAME) devices in the Nokia Store where according to AmnesiaGames CEO- it was downloaded near 1.5 million times achieving top 10 rankings in some Asian countries. After this event, AmnesiaGames become a developer partner for Nokia Chile and for two years developed series of games and applications for J2ME and Symbian.

In 2012, the company refocused its strategy and began building games for iOS and Android. As the company had experienced first-hand the fragmentation problem in J2ME, it was soon obvious they had to overcome the new fragmentation problem of all the competing platforms with a technological tool. During 2012 the engineers at AmnesiaGames developed a proprietary engine called internally APE (Amnesia Programing Engine). The engine is programmed in a C++ like scripting language, is intended for 2D games and exports to several platforms including: iOS, Android, WindowsPhone, Windows8, HTML5 and Flash.

In December 2012 AmnesiaGames released its first multiplatform game based on its proprietary engine APE. The name of the game is again “Ninja Joe”. The version from 2010 is now called “Ninja Joe Classic”. The game is available in Apple Appstore, Google Play, WindowsPhone, Windows8, Amazon, Blackberry 10, Blackberry Playbook and Samsung Apps.

The game was the first Chilean game created for Windows 8 and was spotlighted by Amazon as Free App of the Day on 9th Abril 2013, by Lenovo in its Windows8 Store on 18 March 2013, Samsung Apps Spain on 14 July 2013 and by Microsoft Chile on 16 June and 2 August 2013.

In February 2013, AmnesiaGames released the game “31 Minutos” based on the Chilean TV series 31 minutos that is popular in Chile and Mexico. The game was commissioned by mobile operator Claro Chile in December 2012. The game had to be ready and published for the show of “31 minutos” at the “Festival de Viña” on 27 February 2013. That means that AmnesiaGames had only 7 weeks to design and create the game. The game was designed in 2 weeks. The game designers at AmnesiaGames decided to use the micro-games genre (made popular by Wario Party). The game would include new interviews by the characters of the TV series and include 50 micro-games. The brainstorming phase produced 120 micro-games designs. 70 were selected and prototyped on paper. 50 were finally selected for production. In 5 weeks, the team at AmnesiaGames created 50 micro-games. The game included new interviews and dialogs, and even new characters, which were developed by the team in collaboration with the creative team from Aplaplac, the creators and owners of the TV series 31 minutos. The game achieved top rankings in Chile and México and was featured by Apple in May 2013.

Between 2007 and 2012 AmnesiaGames also created and operated the mobile portals of two national mobile operators: ENTEL and CLARO CHILE. Together, its software sustained 20 million monthly pageviews.

AmnesiaGames is a founding member of the "Asociacion Gremial Chilena de Desarrolladores de Videojuegos (VideoGamesChile). Actually, the CEO of AmnesiaGames was its first president.

AmnesiaGames is also a member of GECHS (Grupo de Empresas Chilenas de Software), the association for mid-size software companies in Chile.

The company participates regularly in events related to Game Development and Entrepreneurship. AmnesiaGames and its CEO are also regularly interviewed in the Chilean press.

== Games ==
- 31 minutos (2012 - iOS, Android, Windows Phone, based on the TV series 31 minutos)
- GirlyGirl (2013 - Facebook )
- Ninja Joe (2012 - iOS, Android, Windows Phone, Windows 8, Blackberry, Amazon, Samsung)
- World of Doodles (2012 - Facebook )
- Ciudad McDonald’s (2011 - Symbian)
- Ninja Joe Undercover (2011 - Symbian)
- Balloon Buster (2011 - Symbian)
- Ninja Joe (Classic) (2010 - J2ME)
- Combate Politico (2010 - J2ME)
- Shooting Range Simulator (2009 - C++ - Made for the Chilean Army)

Other games under NDA.
