= Redbanc =

- Operating area: Chile
- Members: 21
- ATMs: 3,688 (2005)
- Founded: 1987
- Website: www.redbanc.cl

Redbanc is an interbank network in Chile connecting the ATMs of all the banks in Chile. ATMs are available all over Chile and Redbanc ATMs work with any Cirrus, MasterCard, or Visa card.

== History ==
All the ATMs in Chile are on the Redbanc system after Redbanc merged with Banlider and the ATMs of Banco del Estado.
