= Empresa de Servicios Sanitarios de Los Lagos =

Water supply and sanitation company in Chile

- Industry: Water & Wastewater
- Founded: 1990
- Headquarters: Puerto Montt, Chile

Empresa de Servicios Sanitarios de Los Lagos is company that provides water supply and sanitation in the Chilean regions of Los Ríos and Los Lagos. It was established in 1990 and has its headquarter in Puerto Montt. The parent company is Aguas Andinas and it has been controlled by the Spanish company Agbar since 2008.

The company was responsible for a crisis that left the city of Osorno without water supply from July 10 to July 21, 2019. The origin of the crisis was an oil spill that affected both the water supply and Rahue River. In a popular consultation held in Osorno following the 2019 Chilean protests over 90% of the participants voted to end ESSAL's concession. Results are however, not binding.

During the 2021 Panguipulli riots its office in Panguipulli caught fire causing the company to open a new office in a different place of the city a few days later.
