= List of shopping malls in Chile =

This article is a list of shopping malls, locally referred to as "shopping centers" in Chile.

== City of Concepción ==
- Mall del Centro Concepción
- Mall Plaza
  - Mall Plaza El Trébol
  - Mall Plaza Mirador Bio Bio

== City of Las Condes ==
- Mall Plaza Los Dominicos

== City of La Reina ==
- Mall Plaza Egaña

== Santiago Metropolitan Region ==
- Alto Las Condes
- Costanera Center
- Mall Arauco
  - Mall Arauco Maipú
  - Mall Arauco Quilicura
  - Parque Arauco
- Mall Barrio Independencia
- Mall Florida Center
- Mall Paseo Quilín
- Mall Plaza
  - Mall Plaza Alameda
  - Mall Plaza Egaña
  - Mall Plaza Los Dominicos
  - Mall Plaza Norte
  - Mall Plaza Oeste
  - Mall Plaza Sur
  - Mall Plaza Tobalaba
  - Mall Plaza Vespucio
- Portal La Dehesa

== Valparaíso Region ==
- Arauco Outlet Curacuma
- Arauco San Antonio
- Espacio Urbano Los Andes
- Mall Marina
- Mall Paseo Ross
- Mall Shopping Center Quillota
- Open La Calera
- Open San Felipe
- Portal Belloto
- Viña Outlet Park
