= E-CL =

E-CL S.A.
- Type: Sociedad Anónima
- Traded as: BCS: ECL
- Industry: Utility
- Founded: 1981
- Headquarters: Santiago, Chile
- Key people: Jan Franciscus María Flachet, (Chairman); Juan Claveria Aliste, (CEO)
- Products: Electricity generation and transmissomn Natural gas
- Revenue: ▼US$ 1.1 billion (2012)
- Net income: ▼US$ 56.2 million (2012)
- Number of employees: 781
- Parent: Engie
- Website: www.e-cl.cl

E-CL is a Chilean utility company based in Santiago and formerly known as Empresa Electrica Del Norte Grande or Edelnor. The company, which changed its name in 2010, was founded in 1981 with contributions from the Empresa Nacional de Electricidad SA (Endesa) and the Corporacion de Fomento de la Produccion (CORFO).

The company's activities comprise the production, transportation and distribution of electric energy and natural gas; the purchase, sale and transportation of liquid, solid and gaseous fuels; as well as the provision of engineering consulting services. The company's products and services are principally oriented towards the mining companies and other industries operating in the north of Chile.

The company is a subsidiary of French company Engie and its main competitors are Colbún, AES Andes and Chilectra.

== See also ==
- Chapiquiña power plant
