= Aguas Andinas =

Water Company of Santiago de Chile

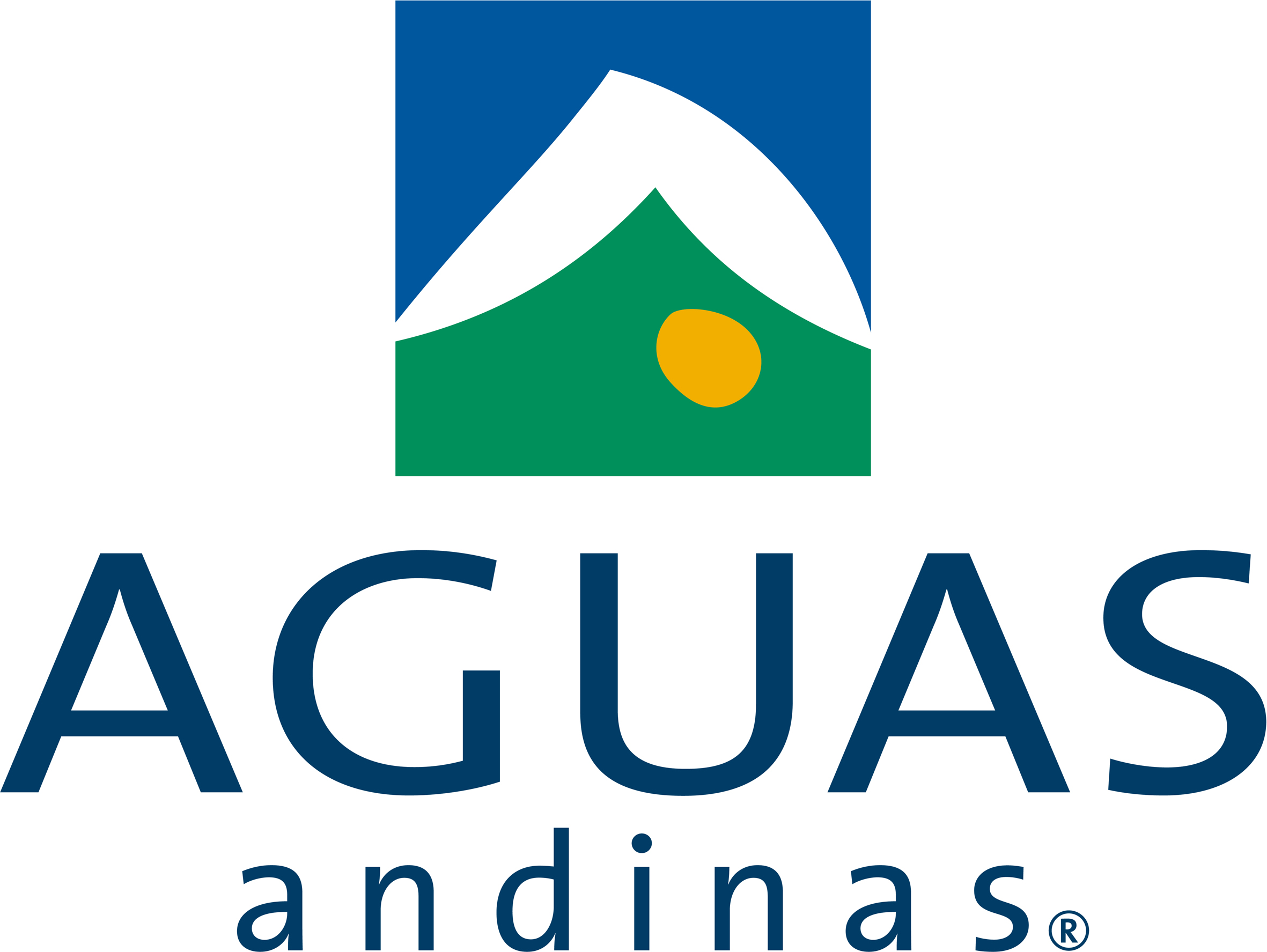
- Company type: Sociedad Anónima
- Industry: Water & Wastewater
- Headquarters: Santiago, Chile
- Key people: Marta Colet Gonzalo (CEO)
- Number of employees: 1,083
- Parent: Grupo Agbar
- Subsidiaries: ESSAL

Aguas Andinas is a water supply and sanitation company that operates in Chile. Aguas Andinas has been controlled by the Spanish company Agbar since 2008. The company owns ESSAL, a subsidiary in Los Lagos and Los Ríos regions of southern Chile, which it started to divest in 2020.
