= SalfaCorp =

Chile-based construction and real estate company

SalfaCorp Ingienería Construcción Inmobiliaria S.A.
- Company type: Sociedad Anónima
- Traded as: BCS: SALFACORP
- Industry: Real estate, construction
- Founded: 1929
- Headquarters: Santiago, Chile
- Key people: Alberto Etchgaray Aubry, (Chairman)
- Products: Infrastructure
- Revenue: ▲US$ 2.2 billion (2012)
- Net income: ▲US$ 48.3 million (2012)
- Number of employees: 2,992
- Website: www.salfacorp.com

SalfaCorp is a Chilean company operating in the sector of construction and real estate. It is an international company with offices in Santiago, Chile; Buenos Aires, Argentina; Bogotá, Colombia; Lima, Peru; Shanghai, China; and Petaling Jaya, Malaysia.

SalfaCorp leads the industrial assembly and civil work market in Chile. The company operates in two business units: engineering and construction and property development. Engineering and construction is engaged in civil works, industrial assembly, new businesses such as industrial support, maritime works and, tunnels. Property development is engaged in the execution of all related activities from the design and coordination of projects including construction, marketing and after sales.

Aconcagua Inmobiliaria is a corporation from SalfaCorp, it has projects from Antofagasta to Puerto Montt. Is one of the most important Corporation.
