= Sonda S.A. =

Chilean IT company

SONDA S.A.
- Type: Sociedad Anónima
- Traded as: BCS: SONDA
- Industry: IT
- Founded: 1974
- Headquarters: Santiago, Chile
- Key people: Andrés Navarro Haeussler, (Founder); Mario Pavón Robinson, (Chairman); Raúl Vejár Olea, (CEO)
- Products: Software & Hardware; Outsourcing; Datacenter
- Revenue: ▼US$ 1.4 billion (2012)
- Net income: ▲US$ 95.0 Million (2012)
- Number of employees: 23,000
- Website: www.sonda.com. www.sondait.com.br.

SONDA is a Chilean multinational IT company headquartered in Santiago, it is the biggest in the sector of Information technology (IT) in Latin America. Founded in 1974 in association with Copec. Its engaged in the provision of consultancy services and information technology (IT). The Company's services are structured in three divisions: IT Services, including IT outsourcing, systems integration projects, infrastructure support, professional services and consulting and BPO (Business Processes Operation) services; Applications, oriented to support its clients' business processes through own or third-party software; and Platforms, which provides platforms as a service through a network of regional alliances and partnerships, such as Cisco, Autodesk, EMC, HP, IBM, VCE, Microsoft, Oracle and VMware, among others.

The company is present in 11 countries: Chile, Argentina, Brazil, Colombia, Costa Rica, Ecuador, Mexico, Panama, Peru and Uruguay and its main competitors are Totvs, Stefanini, Neoris and CPM Braxis.
