= Jorge Rosenblut =

- Born: Jorge Rosenblut; 7 June 1952 (age 74)
- Education: Universidad de Chile; University of Harvard
- Occupations: Civil engineer, academic, businessman and consultant
- Political party: Partido por la Democracia

Jorge Rosenblut Ratinoff (born 7 July 1952) is a Chilean engineer, academic, businessman, consultant and the former president of ENDESA; the Latin American branch of the Italian-based ENEL Group.

Rosenblut is a vocal supporter of the Pacific Alliance and has written extensively on the subject. In 2013 Rosenblut wrote a guest post for the Financial Times online editions in which he expressed his conviction that the Pacific Alliance, of which Chile is a member, represents a "seismic shift in Latin American integration" by standing together" in what promises to be a historic breakthrough for the region". During a speech in Washington DC, also in April 2013, Rosenblut described the Pacific Alliance as "a route to join the league of highly developed nations".

Rosenblut studied at the Instituto Nacional General José Miguel Carrera and then went on to study industrial civil engineering at the University of Chile, where he then continued his academic activities after he had graduated.

In the 1980s, he studied for a master's degree in Public Administration at Harvard University in the United States, where he had travelled to be with his then wife, Liora Haymann.

He was working at the World Bank in North America when he received a call from Edgardo Boeninger, who invited Rosenblut to work with him in the Ministry General Secretariat of the Presidency (Spanish: Ministerio Secretaría General de la Presidencia), specifically as the Head of the Inter-ministerial Division.

His first foray into the world of business came in 1994, as undersecretary of telecommunications in Chile, when he got the multicarrier off the ground following challenging negotiations with major companies including CTC, Entel, and Telex-Chile. He was subsequently one of those closest to Eduardo Frei Ruiz-Tagle, who named him general undersecretary to the President's office, second to Genaro Arriagada.

Political differences with certain members of the governing Concert of Parties for Democracy (Spanish: Concertación de Partidos por la Democracia) brought about his move to the private sector after almost seven years in the Public Sector. (Note: His main disputes were with Arriagada himself, the Minister of Defense Edmundo Pérez Yoma, and the undersecretary of public works, Guillermo Pickering. The latter two men are accused of having made derogatory comments (they are alleged to have talked privately of a jewish troika) against three Jewish members of the Government, one of whom was Rosenblut. Additionally, the then member of parliament Juan Carlos Latorre accused him of "challenging, obstructing or preventing" the passing of various draft bills that were supposedly detrimental to some businessmen.) In 1997, he started his business Development of Strategic Projects (Spanish: Desarrollo de Proyectos Estratégicos) which became his center of operations in Chile.

Through this work he became close to economic groups in the country, becoming president of Chilectra S.A. (now Enel Distribución S.A.) in the year 2000.

Determined to make the most of the business opportunities opened up by the Free Trade Agreement (FTA) with the United States, he started up a branch of his consultancy firm in Miami in 2002, this time under the name Strategies and Business Development. In Miami, he also founded the Real Estate Development firm Terra Group with Patricio Kreutzberger, son of Mario Kreutzberger, along with the architecture firm Archiplan, with brothers Jaime and Ignacio Hernández, Raimundo Onetto, Argentinian Manuel Grosskopf and Cuban-American businessman Pedro Martin. Rosenblut was vice-chairman at Terra Group, which focused on developing High Rise Buildings until he left the business in 2009. The demand generated by these projects led him to settle in Miami at the beginning of 2004.

In 2005, he was a fundraiser and one of the main contacts linking socialist candidate – and future president – Michelle Bachelet with the business world.

In 2009, after almost a decade as the head of Chilectra he took on the presidency of Endesa.

In 2012, as president of Endesa, Rosenblut said that Chile "must double its energy network in the next ten years". He has also stated his belief in the importance of generating a higher percentage of energy through renewable energy sources to reduce Chile's dependence on imported oil, specifically through the building of hydroelectric power stations. In an interview with La Tercera newspaper in 2012 Rosenblut repeated his conviction that the concept of CALL (Competitive, Abundant, Clean (Spanish: Limpia) and Local) is key to the future of Chile's energy policy, an opinion that he has voiced publicly on previous occasions.

In 2013, Mr. Rosenblut was named one of the "100 Most Powerful Businessmen in Latin America" by Latin Business Chronicle.

In 2015, Mr. Rosenblut left ENDESA and is living full-time in Miami where he works as a business consultant and frequent lecturer and writer on Latin American affairs.

A friend of the economist Jorge Marshall, both are mainstays of the think tank Expansiva, allowing him to stay abreast of the state of the country.

Preceded by Alfredo Llorente Legaz	President of Chilectra; 28 January 2000 – 16 December 2009	Succeeded by Juan María Moreno Mellado
Preceded by Mario Valcarce Durán	President of the National; Electricity Company (Endesa); 17 December 2009 –	Succeeded by Current Incumbent
