= Francisco Huenchumilla =

Chilean politician (born 1944)

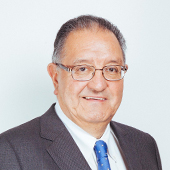

Member of the Senate
- Incumbent
- Assumed office 11 March 2018
- Preceded by: Creation of the circunscription
- Constituency: Araucanía Region

Intendant of the Araucanía Region
- In office 11 March 2014 – 25 August 2015
- President: Michelle Bachelet
- Preceded by: Andrés Molina Magofke
- Succeeded by: Andrés Jouannet

Mayor of Temuco
- In office 6 December 2004 – 6 December 2008
- Preceded by: René Saffirio
- Succeeded by: Miguel Becker

Ministry General Secretariat of the Presidency
- In office 3 March 2003 – 3 June 2004
- President: Ricardo Lagos
- Preceded by: Mario Fernández Baeza
- Succeeded by: Eduardo Dockendorff

Undersecretary of the Chilean Navy
- In office 3 March 2003 – 3 June 2004
- President: Ricardo Lagos
- Preceded by: Patricio Morales Aguirre
- Succeeded by: Carlos Mackenney Urzúa

Member of the Chamber of Deputies
- In office 11 March 1990 – 11 March 2002
- Preceded by: Creation of the position
- Succeeded by: Eduardo Saffirio
- Constituency: 50th District (Temuco and Padre Las Casas)

Personal details
- Born: 22 March 1944 (age 82) Temuco, Chile
- Party: Christian Democratic Party (1964−present)
- Spouse: María Antonieta Suárez
- Children: Six
- Parent(s): Francisco Huenchumilla Pichihueche; Blanca Jaramillo
- Education: University of Chile (LL.B)
- Occupation: Politician
- Profession: Lawyer

Francisco Huenchumilla Jaramillo (born 22 March 1944) is a Mapuche Chilean lawyer and christian-democratic politician who has served as minister, deputy and senator.

He joined the Christian Democratic Party (PDC) in 1964, serving as councilor, provincial president, and delegate to the party’s National Board. He was president of the Association of Workers of the Agrarian Reform Corporation in Cautín (1971–1973), a provincial leader of the Central Unitaria de Trabajadores de Chile (CUT), and a councilor of the Chilean Bar Association.

After 1973, he worked as an advisor to companies, organizations, and trade unions. He also pursued an academic career as a professor at the University of La Frontera in Temuco. He participated in the 1988 national plebiscite as coordinator of the opposition coalition Concertación de Partidos por la Democracia and served as president of the “No” campaign in the Araucanía Region.

== Political career ==
In the 1989 parliamentary elections, he was elected deputy for District No. 50, representing the communes of Temuco and Padre Las Casas in the Araucanía Region, for the 1990–1994 legislative term.

He obtained 38.67% of the total valid votes. During this period, he served on the Permanent Commissions of Finance and National Defense. He was also a member, and later president, of the Special Commission on Indigenous Peoples, and a member of the Special

=== Commission on Intelligence Services ===
He also served as deputy leader of the Christian Democratic caucus. He attended the 96th Conference of the Inter-Parliamentary Union in China, where he met on 29 September 1996 with Chen Muhua, vice president of the Standing Committee of the Pan-American Nikkei Association (APN).

In the 1993 parliamentary elections, he was re-elected deputy for the same district for the 1994–1998 term. He continued to sit on the Permanent Commissions of Finance and National Defense, and served as first vice president of the Chamber of Deputies from 19 March to 19 November 1996.

He won a second re-election in the 1997 parliamentary elections, serving the 1998–2002 term as deputy for District 50. In this period, he participated only in the Permanent Commission of Finance.

In 2001, he lost an internal contest for the Christian Democratic Party’s Senate candidacy to Jorge Lavandero. That same year, President Ricardo Lagos appointed him to the «Commission on Historical Truth and New Deal with Indigenous Peoples», which advised the president on indigenous perspectives on Chile’s historical development and proposed a new state policy regarding native peoples.

=== Minister and Mayor ===
On 26 September 2002, after the six-month period of ineligibility following his departure from Congress, he was sworn in as Undersecretary of the Navy under President Lagos, serving until April 2003, when he was appointed Minister Secretary-General of the Presidency.

He resigned on 10 June 2004 to run for mayor of Temuco in the municipal elections that year, winning with 56.03% of the vote. He served a four-year term until December 2008. The following year he unsuccessfully sought election to the Senate for Southern Araucanía.

In the 2012 municipal elections, he again ran for mayor of Temuco on the Concertación list (List F), receiving 29,905 votes (37.51%) but was defeated by Miguel Becker of National Renewal (RN).

=== Intendant of Araucanía ===
In February 2014, President-elect Michelle Bachelet appointed him intendant of the Araucanía Region for her second administration, a position he assumed on 11 March of that year.

As intendant, he sought closer relations with Mapuche communities to address their demands. On 12 March 2014 he read a declaration apologizing to the Mapuche people «for the dispossession that the Chilean State inflicted upon them of their lands». His approach received both positive and negative responses from indigenous communities, while also drawing criticism from the political opposition, which led to the interpellation of Interior Minister, Rodrigo Peñailillo. He was removed from office on 25 August 2015.

=== Senator of the Republic ===
He ran for a Senate seat in the 2017 parliamentary elections, representing the 11th Circumscription (Araucanía Region), within the «Convergencia Democrática» list, for the 2018–2026 term. He obtained 38,203 votes (11.31% of the validly cast ballots) and assumed office on 11 March 2018.

Since 21 March 2018, he has been a member of the Permanent Commissions of Constitution, Legislation, Justice and Regulations—serving as its president until 12 March 2019—and of Ethics and Transparency, which he has chaired since 20 March 2019. Since April 2018, he has also been part of the Permanent Commission of Public Security and the Bicameral Transparency Group. On 13 March 2019 he joined the Permanent Commission of Internal Regime, and from 23 March 2022 he has been a member of the Permanent Commission of National Defense.
