= John Biehl =

Chilean diplomat (1939–2023)

John Biehl del Río

Ambassador to the United States for Chile
- In office 1 August 1994 – 31 July 1998
- President: Eduardo Frei Ruiz-Tagle
- Preceded by: Patricio Silva Echeñique
- Succeeded by: Genaro Arriagada Herrera

Minister Secretary-General of the Presidency
- In office 1 August 1998 – 22 June 1999
- President: Eduardo Frei Ruiz-Tagle
- Preceded by: Juan Villarzú Rohde
- Succeeded by: José Miguel Insulza Salinas

Personal details
- Born: 26 August 1939 Valparaíso, Chile
- Died: 17 December 2023 (aged 84) Santiago, Chile
- Party: Independent, allied with Christian Democrat Party of Chile
- Spouse: Gloria Navarrete Borgoño
- Children: Juan Ignacio, María Loreto, Luis Felipe, María Cristina, Paulina y Oscar
- Education: Universidad Católica de Valparaíso
- Profession: Lawyer and political scientist

John Henry Biehl del Río (/ˈbiːl/; 26 August 1939 – 17 December 2023) was a Chilean lawyer, political scientist, and diplomat who served as the cabinet-level Minister Secretary-General of the Presidency for Eduardo Frei Ruiz-Tagle's administration.

== Early life ==
Biehl was of Danish ancestry. He studied law at the Pontifical Catholic University of Valparaíso in his home city, and later national development in the Netherlands, and finally political science at the University of Essex, where he received his Master's degree.

Biehl was the founder and director of the Institute of Political Science at the Pontifical Catholic University of Chile.

== Diplomatic and political career ==
Although Biehl had never registered for any political party, he was considered more of a Christian Democrat due to his exile after the 1973 Chilean coup d'état and Pinochet's rise to power. He gained diplomatic experience acting as an advisor to various governments. These included that of Óscar Arias in Costa Rica, where he worked as a policymaker and speechwriter; The New York Times referred to him as Arias' "closest confidant" and "alter ego". Biehl also led the successful campaign for Arias' 1987 Nobel Peace Prize. As a United Nations official working for the United Nations Development Programme (UNDP), Biehl also lived in Honduras, Mexico, and Panama. However, Biehl was forced out of the UN in 1987 after demands by the United States government, due to unhappiness in the Reagan administration over his part in Arias' opposition to funding of the Contras.

During the administration of President Eduardo Frei Ruiz-Tagle, Biehl was appointed Chile's ambassador to the United States. He was then appointed Minister Secretary-General of the Presidency, a cabinet-level role which serves as the link between the executive and the legislative. He served from 1998 to 1999.

== After the government ==
As of 2023, Biehl worked for the Organization of American States (OAS), in the Department of Political Affairs. Among other things, he was named by the Secretary General, fellow Chilean José Miguel Insulza, special envoy to direct the mission to observe the regional and presidential elections in Nicaragua, conducted 5 March through 5 November 2006. Biehl died on 17 December 2023, at the age of 84.
