= Peñailillo =

Peñailillo is a surname. Notable people with the surname include:

- Nicolás Peñailillo (born 1991), Chilean footballer
- Rodrigo Peñailillo (born 1973), Chilean politician
