= Gob.cl =

Official website of the Government of Chile

- Logo of Gob.cl

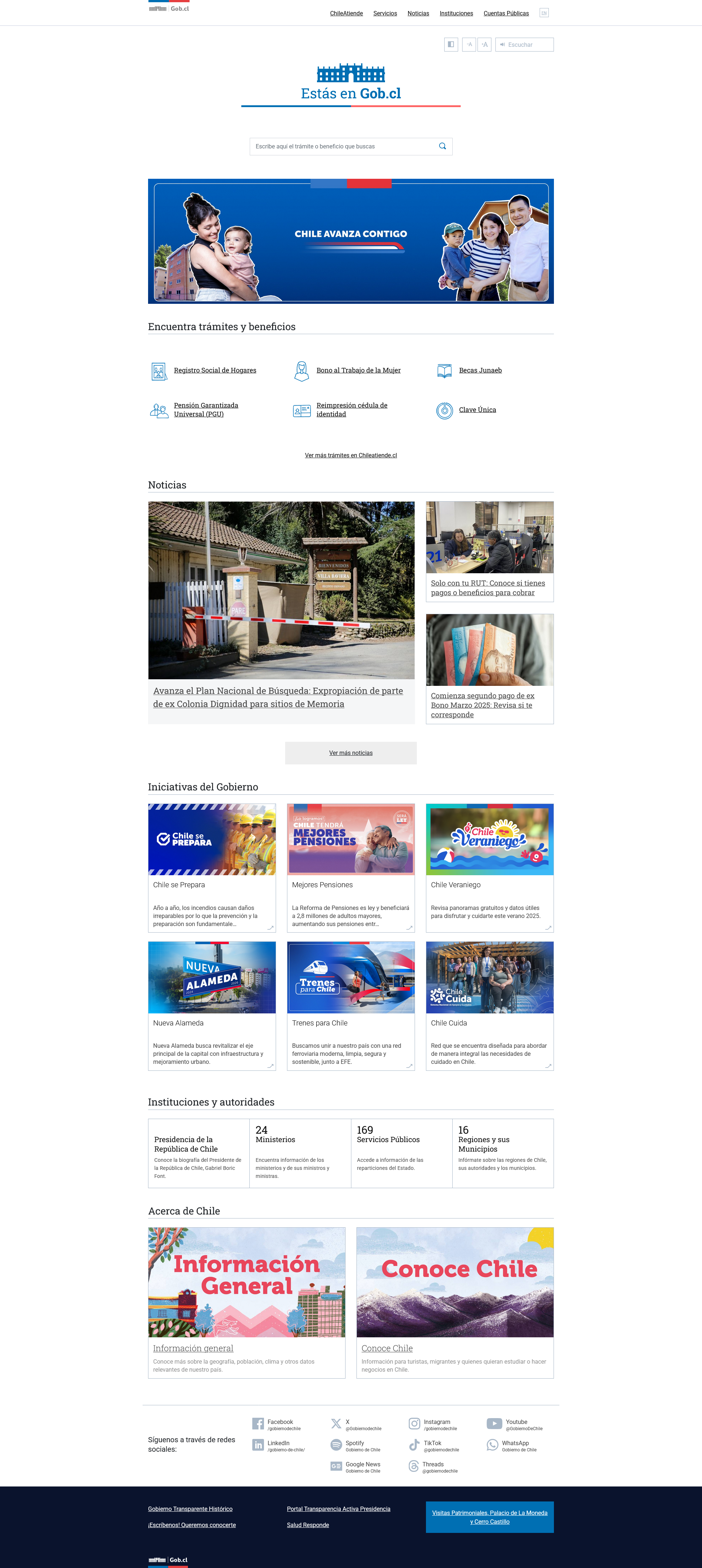
- Homepage of Gob.cl in 2025
- Website type: Government portal
- Available in: Spanish
- Owner: Government of Chile
- Website: www.gob.cl
- Commercial: No
- Launched: 2002; 24 years ago
- Current status: Active

Gob.cl is the official website and digital portal of the government of Chile. It serves as a centralized platform for citizens to access government services, information, and resources. The website is managed by the Digital Government Division of the Ministry General Secretariat of the Presidency and is designed to promote transparency, efficiency, and accessibility in public administration.

Gob.cl provides a wide range of services and information, including access to government procedures and forms, information about public policies and programs, news and updates from the Chilean government, links to other government agencies and institutions, and tools for citizen participation and engagement.

The website is available in Spanish and is designed to be user-friendly, with a focus on accessibility for all citizens, including those with disabilities.

== History ==
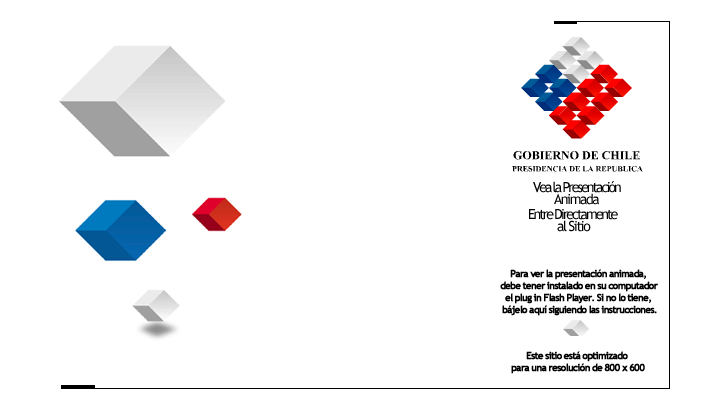
The gobiernodechile.cl website in 2000

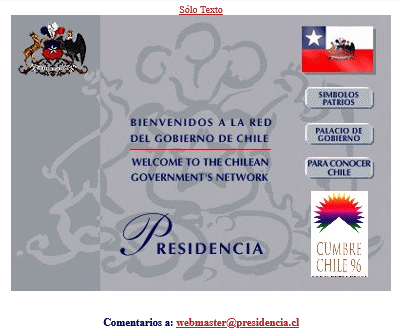
The Presidencia.cl website in 1996

The Chilean government website was first launched in late 1996 as Presidencia.cl. By August 2000, the Presidency website moved to GobiernodeChile.cl, while an all-government website was set-up in Gob.cl. It was launched as part of the Chilean government's efforts to modernize public administration and improve access to government services. In 2002, the Government website was redesigned.

Over the years, the portal has undergone several updates to enhance its functionality and user experience. In 2016, the website was redesigned to align with the Chilean government's broader digital transformation strategy, which aims to streamline public services and promote digital inclusion.

== Governance ==
Gob.cl is managed by the Digital Government Division of the Ministry General Secretariat of the Presidency. The division is responsible for overseeing the development and maintenance of the portal, as well as implementing policies to promote digital transformation across the Chilean government.

== See also ==
- ClaveÚnica
