= KMG =

KMG may refer to:

== Music ==
- KMG the Illustrator, member of the rap group Above the Law
- KMG Records (Killen Music Group), a Christian record label
- The KMG's (Krazy Mess Groovers), a Belgian musical group

== Companies ==
- Kantipur Media Group, Nepal
- KazMunayGas, the state-owned oil and gas company of Kazakhstan
- Kerr-McGee, an energy company involved in the exploration and production of oil and gas
- Klynveld Main Goerdeler (KMG), a predecessor of the professional services company KPMG
- KMG Company, a Dutch company manufacturing amusement rides
- KMG Group (Killarney Manufacturing Group), an Irish engineering company

== Other organisations ==
- KMG Ethiopia, an Ethiopian women's rights group

== Other uses ==
- Kâte language, ISO 639 language code
- Kunming Changshui International Airport, IATA code KMG, serving Kunming, China
- Kunming Wujiaba International Airport, former IATA code KMG, the old Kunming airport
- Kisari Mohan Ganguli, a translator of the Hindu epic Mahabharata
