= Sergio Galilea =

Chilean politician (born 1948)

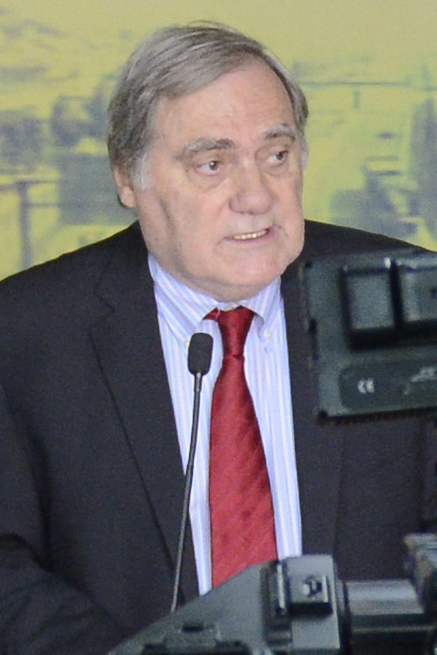

Undersecretary of Public Works
- In office 11 March 2014 – 11 March 2018
- President: Michelle Bachelet
- Preceded by: Lucas Palacios
- Succeeded by: Lucas Palacios

Intendant of Los Lagos Region
- In office 4 January 2008 – 11 March 2010
- President: Michelle Bachelet
- Preceded by: Juan Bertín
- Succeeded by: Juan Sebastián Montes

Intendant of the Santiago Metropolitan Region
- In office 13 March 2000 – 26 December 2001
- President: Ricardo Lagos
- Preceded by: Ernesto Velasco
- Succeeded by: Marcelo Trivelli

Minister of National Assets
- In office 13 August 1999 – 11 March 2000
- President: Eduardo Frei Ruíz-Tagle
- Preceded by: Jorge Heine
- Succeeded by: Claudio Orrego

General Undersecreatry of Government
- In office 18 November 1996 – 13 August 1999
- President: Eduardo Frei Ruíz-Tagle
- Preceded by: Jorge Rosenblut
- Succeeded by: Carlos Carmona Santander

Undersecretary of Urbanism
- In office 11 March 1994 – 18 December 1996
- President: Eduardo Frei Ruíz-Tagle
- Preceded by: Joan McDonald
- Succeeded by: Juan Manuel Cortínez

Personal details
- Born: 20 May 1948 (age 78) Puerto Montt, Chile
- Party: Christian Democratic Party (1960s); Popular Unitary Action Movement (1969−1973); Party for Democracy (1987−2020)
- Spouse(s): Eugenia Weinstein (1992−2002)
- Children: One
- Parent(s): Félix Galilea; Marina Ocón
- Education: University of Chile (BA); Pontifical Catholic University of Chile (Master of Arts) (Ph.D.)
- Occupation: Politician
- Profession: Engineer

Sergio Félix Galilea Ocón (born 20 May 1948) is a Chilean politician and engineer who served as minister of State.

In 2017, he was appointed by Michelle Bachelet as the reconstruction manager after the 2017 wildfires in cities like Santa Olga.

== Early life ==
He is the son of Félix Galilea Martínez and Marina Ocon. In 1982, he married psychologist Eugenia Aída Weinstein Levy, with whom he had one son. The couple divorced in 2002.

He attended the Colegio San Francisco Javier in Puerto Montt. In 1970, he graduated in industrial engineering from the University of Chile, and the following year earned a master's degree in urban and regional planning from the Pontifical Catholic University of Chile.

Originally a member of the Christian Democratic Party in his youth, he joined the MAPU following the split within the Christian Democratic movement. He has maintained close ties with former MAPU members, including Jaime Estévez, Carlos Montes, and Enrique Correa.

== Political career ==
=== Aylwin and Frei Ruiz-Tagle administrations ===
During the administration of Patricio Aylwin, he served as director of the Regional Development Division of the Ministry of the Interior. In that capacity, he oversaw the National Regional Development Fund (FNDR), the Neighborhood Improvement Program, and the Urban Improvement and Community Infrastructure Program.

From March 1994 to November 1996, he served as Undersecretary of Housing and Urban Development, where he was responsible for the strategic planning and budgeting of social housing and participatory pavement programs. From November 1996 to August 1999, he was Undersecretary General of the Presidency, and from 1999 to 2000 he served as Minister of National Assets.

=== Lagos and Bachelet administrations ===
During the administration of Ricardo Lagos, he served as Intendant of the Santiago Metropolitan Region from March 2000 to December 2001. During his tenure, he dealt with issues related to Santiago's air pollution control plan and several landfill sites. He subsequently returned to La Moneda Palace as a presidential adviser in the so-called "second floor" office, where he coordinated relations with political parties.

He later served as National Director of Highways within the Ministry of Public Works from 2003 to 2005, and as Intendant of the Los Lagos Region beginning in January 2008. In the latter position, he oversaw the government's response to the devastating eruption of the Chaitén Volcano in Palena Province.

In 2005, he unsuccessfully ran for a seat in the National Congress of Chile, representing the district that included his native region.

In 2014, President-elect Michelle Bachelet appointed him Undersecretary of Public Works, and he assumed office in March of that year.

Later that year, the Office of the Comptroller General alleged numerous administrative irregularities involving his tenure.

=== Later activities ===
He resigned from the Party for Democracy (PPD) in June 2020 after thirty-three years of membership, having been one of its founding members in 1987.

== Academic career ==
He has served as a full professor at the Institute of Urban Studies of the Pontifical Catholic University of Chile and at the School of Government and Public Management, University of Chile. He has also worked as a consultant on urban, regional, and social planning for international organizations, including the Economic Commission for Latin America and the Caribbean (ECLAC), the Latin American and Caribbean Institute for Economic and Social Planning (ILPES), the Organization of American States (OAS), the World Bank, and UNICEF. Between 1980 and 1982, he served as president of the Inter-American Society of Planning (SIAP).

He has served as director of the Center for Public Policy Analysis at the University of Chile and as coordinator of the university's master's program in Regional and Local Management and Development.
