= Jorge Burgos =

Chilean politician (born 1956)

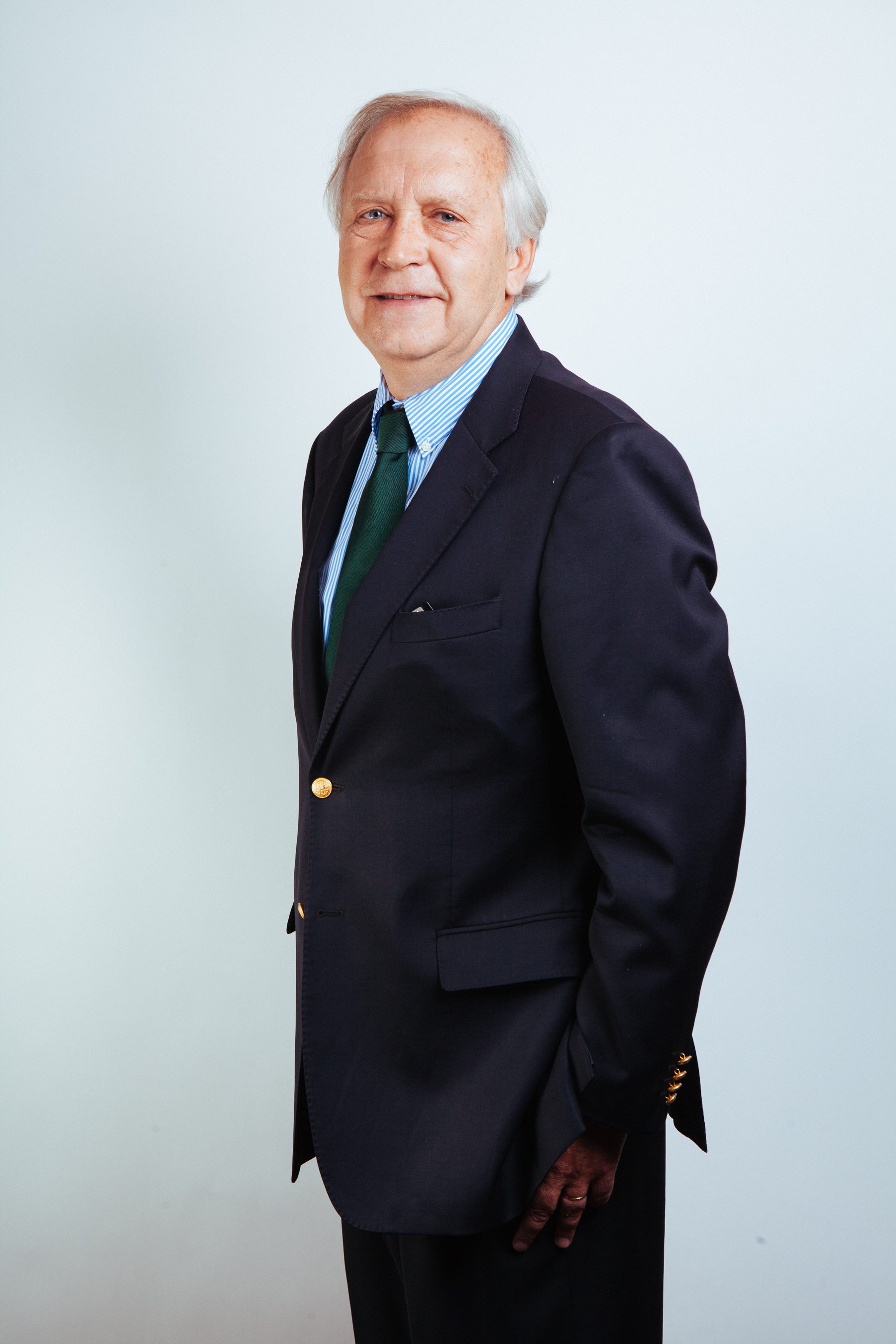

Minister of the Interior and Public Security
- In office 11 May 2015 – 8 June 2016
- President: Michelle Bachelet
- Preceded by: Rodrigo Peñailillo
- Succeeded by: Mario Fernández Baeza

Minister of National Defense
- In office 11 March 2014 – 11 May 2015
- President: Michelle Bachelet
- Preceded by: Rodrigo Hinzpeter
- Succeeded by: José Antonio Gómez

Member of the Chamber of Deputies
- In office 11 March 2002 – 11 March 2014
- Preceded by: Gutenberg Martínez
- Succeeded by: Maya Fernández
- Constituency: 21st District (Providencia and Ñuñoa)

Personal details
- Born: 24 June 1956 (age 69) Santiago, Chile
- Party: Christian Democratic Party (1977−2020); Amarillos por Chile (2022–2025)
- Spouse: Maria Patricia Sala
- Children: Three
- Education: St. Ignatius El Bosque
- Alma mater: University of Chile
- Occupation: Politician
- Profession: Lawyer

Jorge Burgos (born 24 June 1956) is a Chilean lawyer and politician. He was Defense Minister until May 11, 2015 and Interior Minister until 8 June 2016.

In May 2006, he was elected vice president of the Christian Democratic Party (DC). Following the resignation of Soledad Alvear as party president on 28 October 2008, he left his position as vice president and assumed the presidency of the DC until 5 December 2008, when the National Board elected a new leadership.

Burgos was a member of the board of directors of Azul Azul S.A., the company that administers Club Universidad de Chile, from 22 April 2019 until the end of that year.

== Biography ==
Burgos was born on 24 June 1956 in Santiago, Chile. He is married to María Patricia Salas, who serves as a labor judge. He is the father of three children: Vicente, Domingo and Raimundo.

He completed his primary and secondary education at the Colegio San Ignacio de El Bosque, graduating in 1974. He continued his higher education at the Faculty of Law of the University of Chile, where he received his law degree in 1979.

== Political career ==
He began his political involvement in 1975 during his university years. The following year, he joined the Christian Democratic Party (DC) as a member.

Between 1990 and 1993, he served as chief of staff and legal adviser at the Ministry of the Interior. In 1992, he acted as interim Intendant of the Metropolitan Region for a period of three months.

Between 1993 and 1996, during the presidency of Eduardo Frei Ruiz-Tagle, he served as Undersecretary of War. He later resigned from that position to serve as Ambassador of Chile to Ecuador, remaining in office until 2000. That same year, during the presidency of Ricardo Lagos, he returned to Chile to serve as Undersecretary of the Interior, a position he held for one year before pursuing a candidacy for deputy in the Metropolitan Region.

For the 2009 presidential election, he served as territorial chief of the campaign of candidate Eduardo Frei Ruiz-Tagle until August 2009, after which he became campaign spokesperson.

On 24 January 2014, he was appointed Minister of Defense by President-elect Michelle Bachelet. He assumed office on 11 March 2014. He later served as Minister of the Interior and Public Security during Bachelet’s second administration, from 11 May 2015 to 8 June 2016.

He resigned from the Christian Democratic Party in 2019 in order to join the Electoral Qualification Court (Tricel). In late September 2022, he signed the founding charter of the political movement Amarillos por Chile. He left that organization in late May 2025.

== Parliamentary Career ==
=== 2002–2006 Period ===
In December 2001, he was elected deputy representing the Christian Democratic Party (DC) for District No. 21 in the Santiago Metropolitan Region, corresponding to the communes of Ñuñoa and Providencia, for the 2002–2006 legislative period.

He chaired the standing committees on Constitution, Legislation and Justice and on Citizen Security, and was a member of the National Defense Committee. He participated in the Investigative Commissions on Irregularities at Casa de Moneda and on Irregularities in the Los Andes Customs Service.

He was also a member of the Special Commission on Drugs. In 2005, he served as head of the Christian Democratic Party’s caucus in the Chamber of Deputies.

=== 2006–2010 Period ===
In December 2005, he was re-elected for the same district for the 2006–2010 legislative period. He served as First Vice President of the Chamber of Deputies of Chile from 11 March 2006 to 20 March 2007.

He was a member of the standing committees on Human Rights, Nationality and Citizenship; National Defense; Constitution, Legislation and Justice; and Citizen Security and Drugs. He also served on the Investigative Commission on the Transantiago Plan and on the Special Commission for the Study of the Chilean Political Regime. He was part of the Official Presidential Delegation during a trip to Colombia.

In addition, he participated in the Chilean–Colombian, Chilean–Ecuadorian and Chilean–Jordanian interparliamentary groups.

=== 2010–2014 Period ===
In December 2009, he was re-elected for a third term representing District No. 21 in the Santiago Metropolitan Region for the 2010–2014 legislative period.

He served on the standing committees on Citizen Security and Drugs; National Defense; and Constitution, Legislation and Justice.

For the November 2013 parliamentary elections, he decided not to seek re-election for a new term.
