= Nicolás Grau =

Chilean business manager, economist and politician

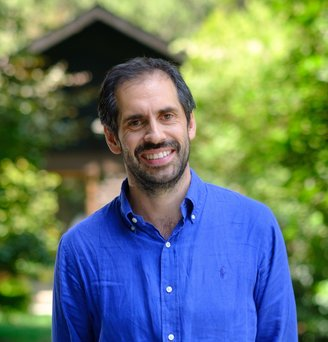

Minister of Finance
- In office 21 August 2025 – 11 March 2026
- President: Gabriel Boric
- Preceded by: Mario Marcel
- Succeeded by: Jorge Quiroz

Minister of Economy, Development and Tourism
- In office 11 March 2022 – 21 August 2025
- President: Gabriel Boric
- Preceded by: Lucas Palacios
- Succeeded by: Álvaro García Hurtado

President of the University of Chile Student Federation
- In office 16 November 2005 – 16 November 2006
- Preceded by: Felipe Melo Rivera
- Succeeded by: Giorgio Boccardo

Personal details
- Born: 9 April 1983 (age 43) Concepción, Chile
- Party: Social Convergence (2019−present)
- Other political affiliations: Autonomist Movement (2016−2019)
- Spouse: Catalina Amenábar
- Parent(s): Francisco Grau Mascayano; Paulina Veloso
- Education: University of Chile (BA) (MA); University of Pennsylvania (PhD)
- Occupation: Politician
- Profession: Economist

Nicolás Andrés Grau Veloso (born 9 April 1983) is a Chilean business manager, economist and politician who been serving as Chile Minister of Finance since 21 August 2025. He previously served as Chile's Minister of Minister of Economy, Development and Tourism from 11 March 2022 to 21 August 2025.

== Biography ==
Grau is the son of Francisco Grau Mascayano and Paulina Veloso, the former Secretary-General of the Presidency during Michelle Bachelet's first government (2006−2010). Despite being born in Concepción, at a young age he moved with his family to Santiago. In Chile's capital city, Grau attended basic and secondary education at the Raimapu School in La Florida.

He completed his BA at the Universidad de Chile Faculty of Economics and Business (FEN), in which he served as president of the Student Federation (FECh) from 2005 to 2006. Similarly, he was publicly questioned for the failed celebration of the FECh first centenary, where were lost around $120 million pesos.

In 2011, he studied a master's degree in economics at the University of Chile. Then, he did a Ph.D. −also in economics− at the University of Pennsylvania, in Philadelphia, United States.

== Political career ==
Parallel to his position as president of the FECh, Grau was a member of the Izquierda Amplia, which grouped the Assembly of Students of the Left, the New University Left —to which he belonged— and the SurDa movement. He had a prominent role as a university leader in the 2006 student mobilization. Also, he was a member of the Presidential Advisory Council on Education.

Grau has worked as a scholar at the FEN. Also, he is a researcher at the Center for Studies on Conflict and Social Cohesion (COES).

In 2017, Grau participated in the foundation of the Broad Front (FA) coalition. Similarly, from 2016, he was a member of the Autonomist Movement (MA), which merged into Social Convergence led by the then deputy Gabriel Boric, also leader of the MA. In that way, Grau was part of the presidential campaigns of Beatriz Sánchez (2017) and Boric, who won the 2021 elections against José Antonio Kast.

On 22 January 2022, Grau was appointed Minister of Economy, Development, and Tourism by the elected president Boric. On 11 March, he assumed the office alongside Boric.

In August 2022, already as minister, He was widely questioned for saying, in a context of high inflation, "Inflation brings costs and benefits to SMEs, unlike individuals," sayings that provoked anger in unions of small and medium-sized companies, as well as parliamentarians demanding their undergraduate and graduate degrees.

As minister Grau has faced severe criticism for his use of twitter in 2020 and 2021 where he made hateful comments against Chilean police. In relation to the death of Francisco Martínez in February 2021 Grau wrote: "Murderous cops. The people have the right to hate you" (Spanish: Pacos asesinos. El pueblo tiene todo derecho a odiarles). In face of mounting criticism in October 2022 Grau deleted the tweets and said that "that these were said in specific context" adding that "I do not share [these comments] now".

Political offices
Preceded by Lucas Palacios	Minister of Economy, Development and Tourism; 2022–2025	Succeeded by Álvaro García Hurtado
Preceded by Mario Marcel	Minister of Finance; 2025–present	Incumbent
