= Lucas Palacios =

Chilean economist

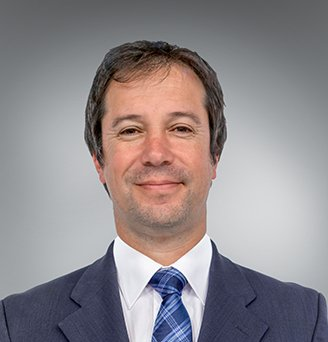
- Official portrait (2019)

Minister of Economy, Development and Tourism
- In office 28 October 2019 – 11 March 2022
- President: Sebastián Piñera
- Preceded by: Juan Andrés Fontaine
- Succeeded by: Nicolás Grau

Undersecretary of Public Works
- In office 11 March 2018 – 28 October 2019
- Preceded by: Sergio Galilea
- Succeeded by: Cristóbal Leturia Infante
- In office 12 November 2012 – 11 March 2014
- Preceded by: Loreto Silva
- Succeeded by: Sergio Galilea

Counsilman of Puente Alto
- In office 6 December 2004 – 12 November 2012

Personal details
- Born: 17 March 1974 (age 52) Lima, Peru
- Party: Unión Demócrata Independiente (1993–1997)
- Spouse: Unknown
- Children: Five
- Parent(s): Patricio Palacios del Villar; María Inés Covarrubias
- Education: Pontifical Catholic University of Chile (BS); University of Salamanca (MS)
- Occupation: Politician
- Profession: Economist

Lucas Patricio Palacios Covarrubias (born 17 March 1974) is a Chilean politician, economist and current militant of Unión Demócrata Independiente (UDI).

On 28 October 2019, he was appointed by Sebastián Piñera as Minister of Economy, Development and Tourism amid beginnings of the 2019–20 social crisis where his predecessor Juan Andrés Fontaine gave controversial statements which immediately animated 18 October riots.

== Biography ==
=== Family ===
He is the son of Luis Patricio Palacios del Villar, an industrial businessman and executive director of the winery Tres Palacios, and María Inés Covarrubias Larraín. Through his mother, he is a great-great-grandson of the conservative politician Ramón Covarrubias Ortúzar, who served as a member of the Chamber of Deputies in the late 19th century.

He is married to María Francisca Medeiros Urzúa, a commercial engineer, with whom he has four children.

=== Education ===
He completed his primary and secondary education at Colegio Sagrados Corazones de Manquehue. He later studied commercial engineering with a concentration in business at the Pontifical Catholic University of Chile. He also earned a Master’s degree in Latin American Studies from the University of Salamanca, Spain.

In August 2015, he published the poetry book Lunavela through RIL Editores. In 2025, he published La mano invisible y otras ficciones, his first narrative work.

== Political career ==
He served as a councillor of Puente Alto between 2004 and 2011. In 2011, he resigned to become an advisor to the Budget Office](Dipres) of the Ministry of Finance during the first presidency of Sebastián Piñera.

On 12 November 2012, he was appointed Undersecretary of Public Works, a position he held until the end of Piñera’s first administration on 11 March 2014.

On 11 March 2018, he was again appointed Undersecretary of Public Works during Piñera’s second administration. He remained in that position until 28 October 2019, when he was appointed Minister of Economy, Development and Tourism, replacing Juan Andrés Fontaine, as part of a cabinet reshuffle during the 2019–2020 Chilean protests.
