= Eduardo Dockendorff =

Chilean minister

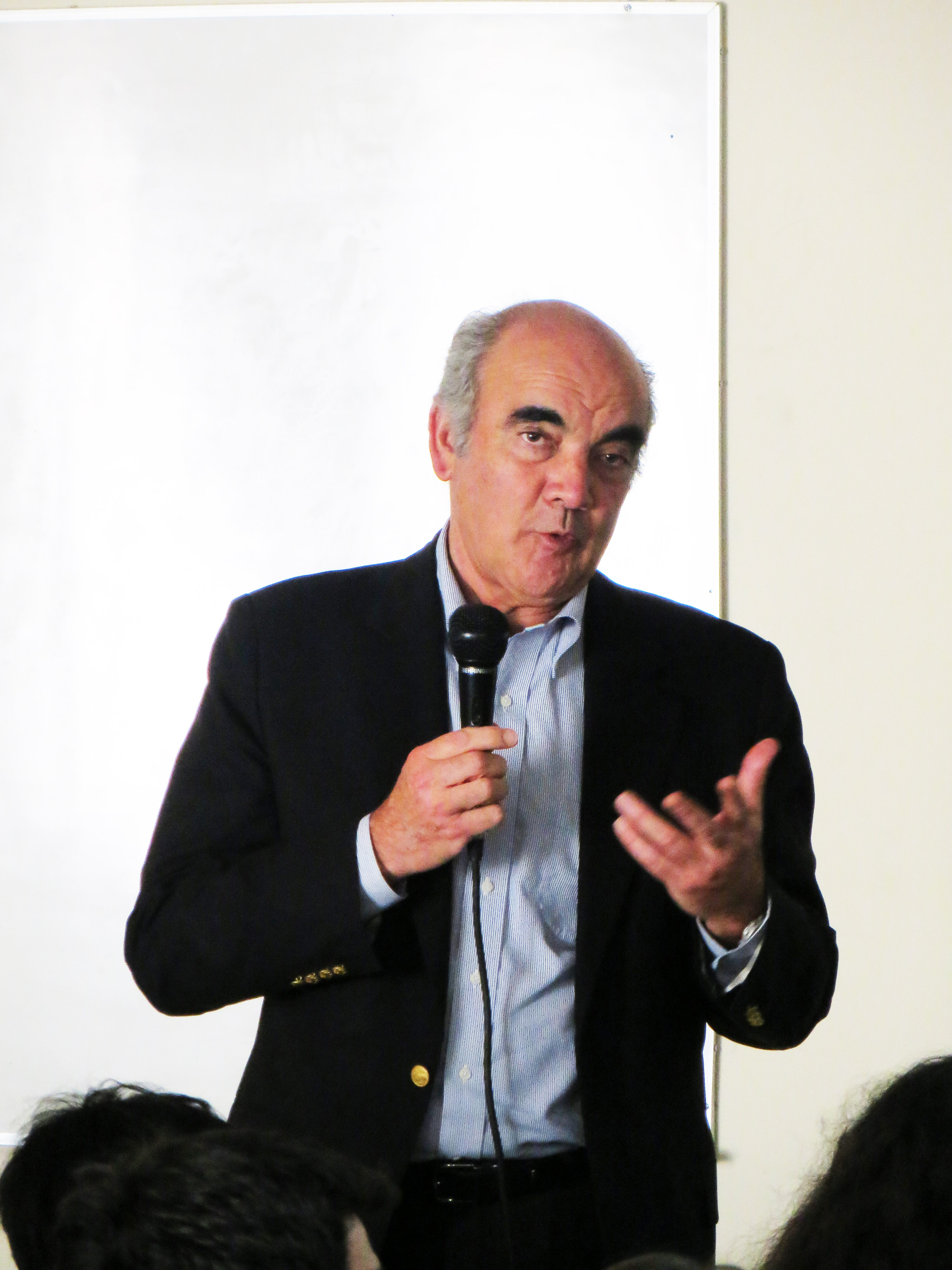

Ministry General Secretary of the Presidency
- In office 3 June 2004 – 11 March 2006
- President: Ricardo Lagos
- Preceded by: Francisco Huenchumilla
- Succeeded by: Paulina Veloso

Undersecretary-General of the Presidency
- In office 11 March 2000 – 11 January 2002
- Preceded by: Carlos Carmona
- Succeeded by: Gonzalo Martner

Personal details
- Born: 22 January 1949 (age 77) Los Ángeles, Chile
- Party: Christian Democratic Party
- Children: Four
- Education: University of Chile (BA); Karlsruhe Institute of Technology (MA) (PhD)
- Occupation: Politician
- Profession: Architect

Eduardo Arturo Dockendorff Vallejos (born 22 January 1949) is a Chilean architect and politician who served as minister during Ricardo Lagos' government (2000–2006).

== Early life ==
He completed his primary and secondary education at the German School of Los Ángeles in Los Ángeles, his hometown. He then studied architecture at the University of Chile, graduating with highest honors in 1976.

From 1979 to 1982, he pursued postgraduate studies at the Institute for Regional Science of the University of Karlsruhe in West Germany. Based in Bonn from 1982 to 1989, he worked for German corporations and institutions (DSE and GTZ) dedicated to international development cooperation.

He began his professional career as a lecturer and academic administrator at the University of Chile (1972–1978). After returning to Chile in 1989, he served as director of the Centro de Estudios del Desarrollo (Center for Development Studies) while also working as a consultant for the German Agency for Technical Cooperation (GTZ) on projects throughout Latin America, in collaboration with other international organizations.

== Political career ==
A member of the Christian Democratic Party, he served during the early years of the administration of Ricardo Lagos as Undersecretary General of the Presidency from 2000 to 2002.

In 2003, while engaged in consultancy work for international organizations, he was invited by Lagos to join the cabinet as Minister Secretary-General of the Presidency. He left office at the end of Lagos's presidential term in March 2006.

Later that year, he became principal adviser to the Valparaíso Heritage Protection and Urban Development Programme, a joint initiative of the Inter-American Development Bank (IDB) and the Government of Chile aimed at consolidating UNESCO's 2003 designation of Valparaíso as a World Heritage Site.

On 28 December 2008, upon concluding his work with the programme, he was elected vice-chairman of the board of Metro Regional de Valparaíso, a subsidiary of the Empresa de los Ferrocarriles del Estado (EFE), where he had already been serving as a board member.

In 2009, he became director of the Institute of Public Affairs at the University of Chile.

In April 2011, he joined the board of the Chilean chapter of Transparency International. In September of the same year, he assumed the presidency of Editorial Universitaria, a publishing company affiliated with the University of Chile.

He has belonged to several academic and public policy organizations, including the Corporación de Altos Estudios Sociales Foro Valparaíso, ProyectAmérica, Corporación Chile XXI, and the Chilean Society for Public Policy.

In 2014, aged 65, he retired from professional life and moved to a remote mountainous area in the commune of Alto Biobío, in southern Chile. There, he has devoted his time to studying and cultivating native forests, writing, reading from his extensive personal library, and playing the piano.
