= Mario Fernández Baeza =

Chilean lawyer, professor and politician

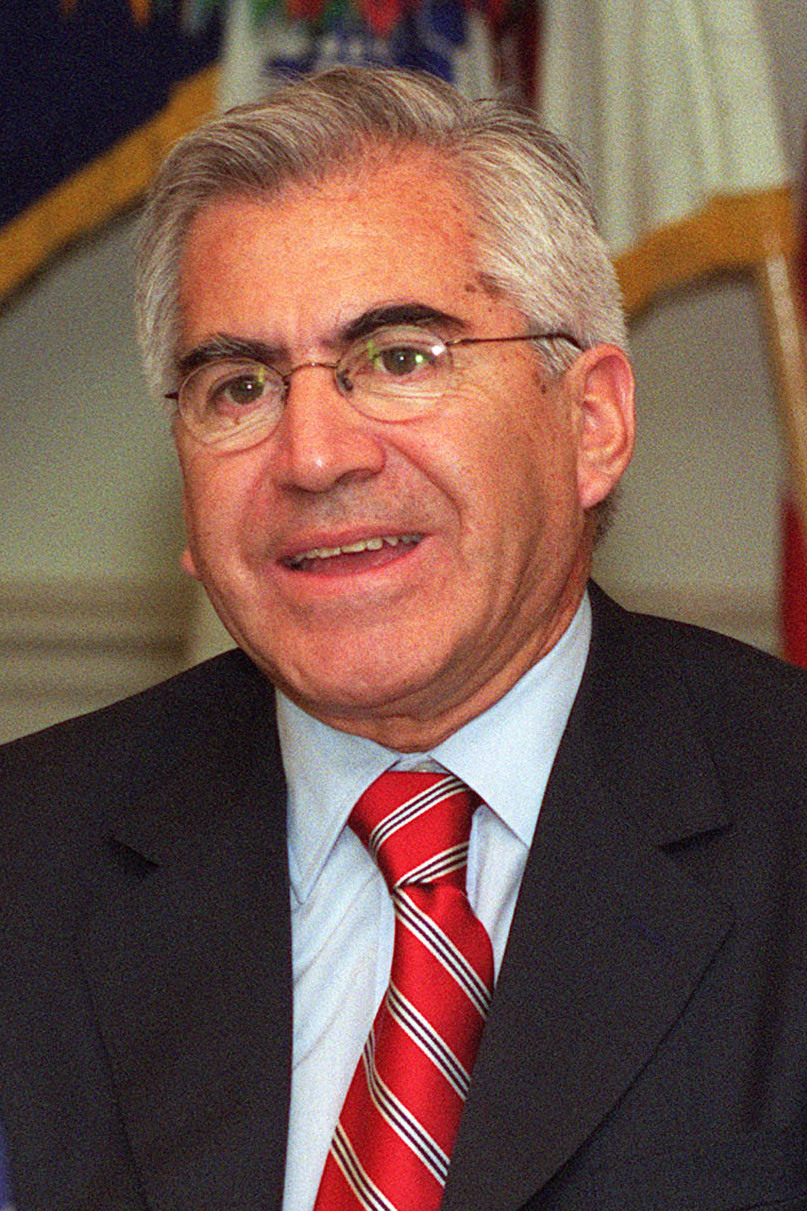

Interior Minister of Chile
- In office 8 June 2016 – 11 March 2018
- President: Michelle Bachelet
- Preceded by: Jorge Burgos
- Succeeded by: Andrés Chadwick

Defense Minister of Chile
- In office 11 March 2000 – 7 January 2002
- President: Ricardo Lagos
- Preceded by: Edmundo Pérez Yoma
- Succeeded by: Michelle Bachelet

Minister Secretary-General of the Presidency
- In office 7 January 2002 – 3 March 2003
- President: Ricardo Lagos
- Preceded by: Álvaro García Hurtado
- Succeeded by: Francisco Huenchumilla

Personal details
- Born: 22 November 1947 (age 78) Rancagua, Chile
- Party: Christian Democratic Party (Chile)
- Education: Universidad de Chile; Heidelberg University

Mario Adolfo del Carmen Fernández Baeza (born 22 November 1947 in Rancagua) is a Chilean lawyer, professor and politician, member of the Christian Democratic Party. He served as the Minister of the Interior and Public Security in Michelle Bachelet's second term.

Previously he served as Minister of State of president Ricardo Lagos, minister of the Chilean Constitutional Court (2006-2011), and ambassador of Chile to Germany, Austria, and Uruguay.

== Studies and academic career ==
He studied in the Public School Nª 3 and the Liceo de Hombres, both in his native town. He was secretary and vice-president of the Students Centre of his school, and its delegate in two National Congresses of Secondary Students. He also was member of the Youth of Catholic Students.

Later he studied in the Universidad de Chile Law School in Valparaíso, between 1967 and 1969, when he moved to the Law School in Santiago. He got a grade in Juridical and Social Sciences in 1975. Afterwards he earned doctorates in political science, history, international right public and philosophy from Heidelberg University, Germany.

He has been Law professor in the Diego Portales University, Pontifical Catholic University of Chile and University of Chile, among others.

== Political and public career ==
He joined the Christian Democrat Party in 1966. He served as undersecretary of Aviation and War during the governments of the presidents Patricio Aylwin and Eduardo Frei Ruiz-Tagle (1990-1993, 1994-1995 and 1996-1999).

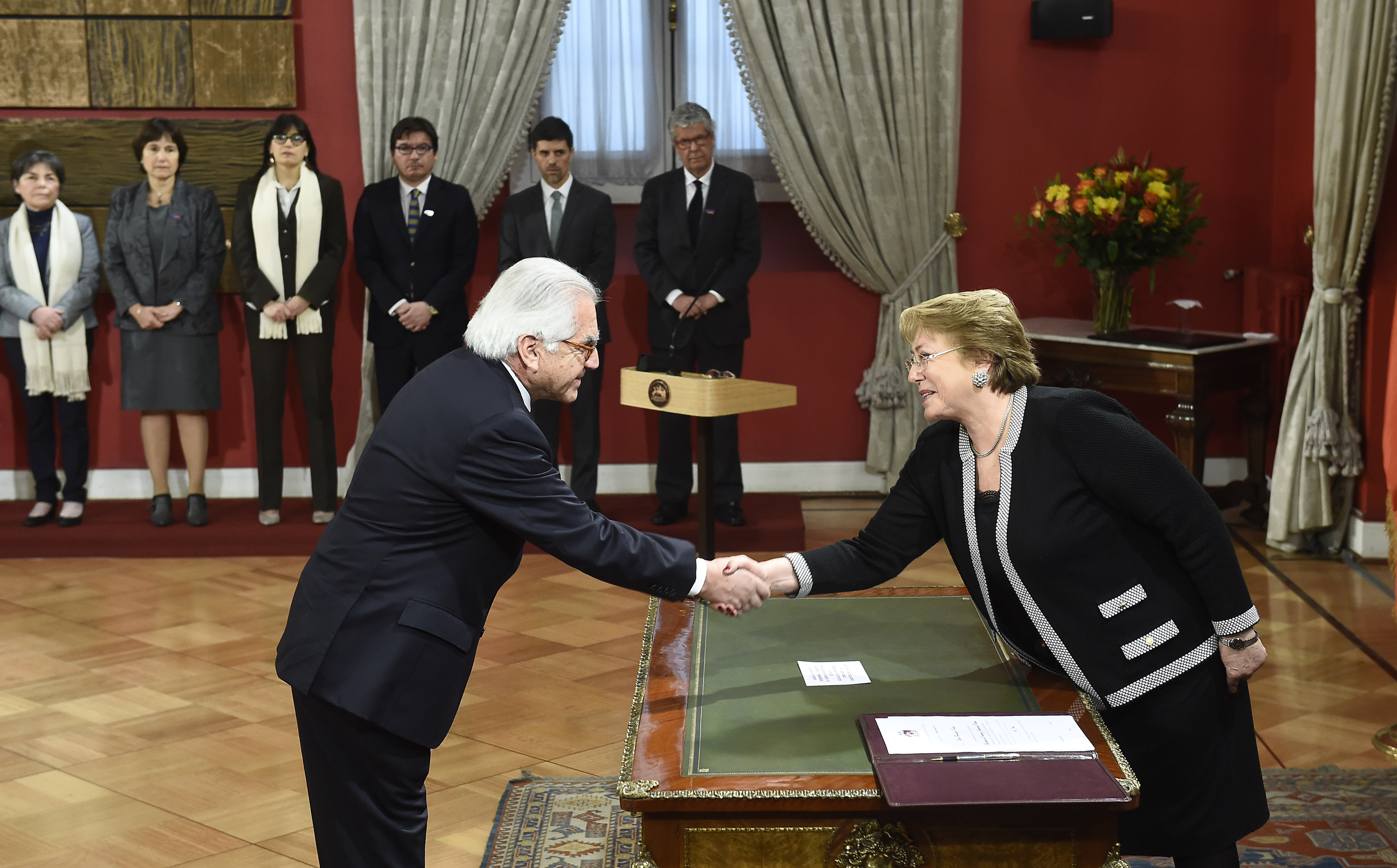
Fernández in the ceremony of assumption of the charge of minister of Interior, in 2016.

In 2000 he was appointed by president Ricardo Lagos as minister of National Defence, until 2002, when a cabinet reshuffle assigned the Ministry to Michelle Bachelet, and Fernández was named Minister General Secretariat of the Presidency (2002-2003). Later he was designated ambassador to Germany.

On 13 December 2005, the Senate appointed him minister of the Constitutional Court of Chile, starting on 1 January 2006. He resigned on 31 March 2011, to join the consulting firm Latinus and restart his teaching classes in different universities.

In 2014 he assumed, in the second term of Michelle Bachelet, as ambassador to Germany, being reassigned in mid-2015 to Uruguay. On 8 June 2016, president Bachelet appointed him as minister of the Interior and Public Security, in replacement of the renounced Jorge Burgos.

== Beliefs ==
Fernández is an Opus Dei member.

== Works ==
- Más allá de la transición, Santiago, 1986
- Las políticas sociales en el Cono Sur, 1975-1985, Santiago, 1986
- (ed., with Dieter Nohlen and O. Bareiro) Kooperation und Konflikt im La Plata-Becken, Saarbrücken/Fort Lauderdale, 1986
- (with Dieter Nohlen and A. van Klaveren) Demokratie und Aussenpolitik in Lateinamerika, Opladen, 1991
- (with Dieter Nohlen) Presidencialismo versus parlamentarismo en América Latina, Caracas, 1991
- (with Dieter Nohlen) El Presidencialismo renovado, Caracas, 1998
