= Enel Generación Chile =

Enel Generación Chile S.A.
- Company type: Sociedad Anónima
- Traded as: BCS: ENELGXCH; NYSE: ENIC; BMAD: XEOC
- Industry: utilities
- Founded: 1943
- Headquarters: Santiago, Chile
- Key people: Joaquín Galindo Vélez, (CEO) Eduardo Escaffi Johnson, (CFO)
- Services: Electricity generation
- Revenue: ▼US$4.5 billion (2011)
- Net income: ▼US$858.0 million (2011)
- Number of employees: 2,447
- Parent: Enel Americas
- Website: www.enel.cl

Enel Generación Chile S.A., formerly known as Endesa Chile and Empresa Nacional de Electricidad, is the largest electric utility company in Chile. It was created as a subsidiary of the state-owned CORFO on 1 December 1943 and was privatized in 1989. As of April 2009, it is owned by Enersis with a 60% stake, which in turn is 61% owned by Endesa International SA, a wholly owned subsidiary of the Spanish Endesa Group. Besides Chile, the Company has investments in Argentina, Colombia and Peru. It also has unconsolidated equity investments in companies engaged primarily in the electricity generation, transmission and distribution business in Brazil. Endesa Chile owns a 51% stake in the controversial HidroAysén project in Aisén Region, which would build 5 hydropower dams on two of Chile's largest wild rivers, the Baker and the Pascua. As of the 17 December 2009, Jorge Rosenblut has been the President of Endesa. Enel has signed a contract to deliver renewable power to SCM Minera Lumina Copper Chile starting in January 2021.

== See also ==
- Chapiquiña power plant
- HidroAysén
- Ralco Hydroelectric Plant
- Endesa (Spain)
- Colbún S.A.
