= Paulina Veloso =

Chilean lawyer and politician

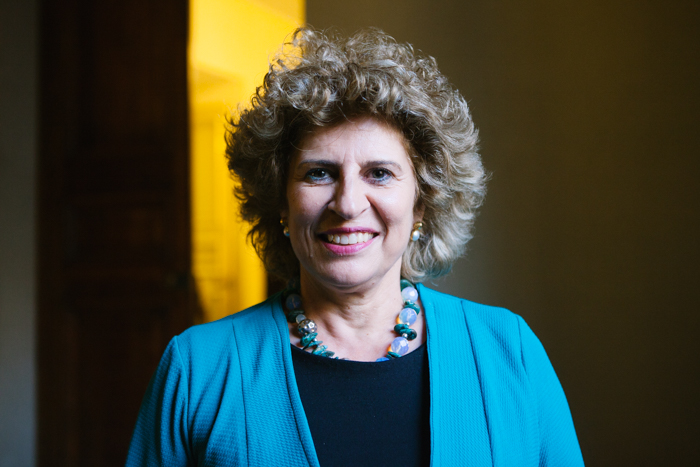

Minister General Secretariat of Government
- In office 6 December 2007 – 12 March 2009
- President: Eduardo Dockendorff
- Preceded by: José Antonio Viera-Gallo
- Succeeded by: Carolina Tohá

Personal details
- Born: 14 August 1957 (age 69) Santiago, Chile
- Party: Socialist Party
- Spouse(s): Alexei Jaccard; Francisco Grau
- Children: 2 (among them, Nicolás Grau)
- Parent(s): Adolfo Veloso; Felicitas Veloso
- Education: University of Concepción; University of Chile
- Occupation: Politician
- Profession: Lawyer

Paulina Eliana Veloso Valenzuela (born in Concepción, Chile, February 14, 1957) is a Chilean lawyer and Socialist Party politician who served as the Minister Secretary-General of the Presidency of Chile (also rendered as the president's Chief of Staff in English) from March 11, 2006 to March 27, 2007.

== Family ==
Velaso is the daughter of the ex-intendant of the Biobío Region, lawyer Adolfo Veloso Figueroa (Socialist Party) and Felicitas Valenzuela, an academic with the Universidad de Concepción. She is a cousin of the intendant of Biobío Region, María Soledad Tohá Veloso. She is also the mother of Nicolás Grau, who was the president of the Students Federation of the Universidad de Chile (Federación de Estudiantes de la Universidad de Chile).

== Life under the Pinochet regime ==
After the Chilean coup d'état of Augusto Pinochet on September 11, 1973, Veloso's fiancé at the time (and later husband), Alexei Jaccard Siegler, was detained and tortured by agents of the DINA. In 1974, the two escaped together for an exile in Switzerland. On May 15, 1977, during a trip to Buenos Aires, Jaccard was detained in the name of Operation Condor for Chilean and Argentine agents. He was moved to the ESMA internment camp, tortured, and later was disappeared.

Paulina Veloso lived in Switzerland for many years, where she obtained dual nationality, and finally returned to Chile in 1979. Veloso studied law at the Universidad de Concepción, graduating with the highest distinction. She was sworn in as a lawyer before the Supreme Court of Chile in 1987. Principally dedicated to the academic life, she has served as the chair of civil law at the Universidad de Chile School of Law in Santiago from 1991 until the present. She also served as member of the Council of the Faculty.

== Government service ==
With the return of democracy to Chile at the beginning of the 1990s, Veloso began to work in various public offices, including Undersecretary of Labor and chief of staff in the Ministry of Labor and Social Security (Ministerio del Trabajo y Previsión Social) from 1990 to 1994, Deputy Director of the National Women's Service (Servicio Nacional de la Mujer) from 1994 to 1997. In 2002 the President appointed Veloso to be a court-assisting attorney for the Court of Appeals of Santiago. In 2005, she was elected a councilor of the State Defense Council (Consejo de Defensa del Estado).

Veloso was appointed Minister Secretary-General of the Presidency by President Michelle Bachelet, and she assumed the post on March 11, 2006. This appointment made her one of the 10 women appointed to Bachelet's historic half-female, half-male cabinet. On March 27, 2007 Velaso was replaced as minister by the Socialist lawyer José Antonio Viera-Gallo as part of Bachelet's rearrangement of the cabinet in the midst of fallout over the handling of Transantiago.
