= José Miguel Insulza =

Chilean politician

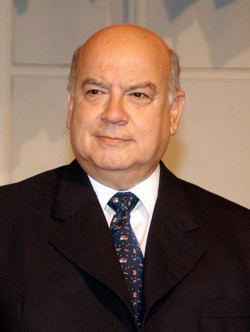

Senator of the Republic of Chile for the Arica y Parinacota Region
- In office 11 March 2018 – 11 March 2026

9th Secretary General of the Organization of American States
- In office May 26, 2005 – May 26, 2015
- Preceded by: Luigi R. Einaudi (acting)
- Succeeded by: Luis Almagro

Minister of the Interior
- In office March 11, 2000 – May 24, 2005
- President: Ricardo Lagos
- Preceded by: Raúl Troncoso
- Succeeded by: Francisco Vidal Salinas

Minister Secretary-General of the Presidency
- In office June 22, 1999 – March 11, 2000
- President: Eduardo Frei Ruiz-Tagle
- Preceded by: John Biel del Río
- Succeeded by: Alvaro García Hurtado

Minister of Foreign Affairs
- In office September 20, 1994 – June 22, 1999
- President: Eduardo Frei Ruiz-Tagle
- Preceded by: Carlos Figueroa Serrano
- Succeeded by: Juan Gabriel Valdés

Undersecretary of Foreign Affairs
- In office March 11, 1994 – September 20, 1994
- President: Eduardo Frei Ruiz-Tagle

Personal details
- Born: 2 June 1943 (age 83) Santiago, Chile
- Party: Socialist Party (since 1985); MAPU (1969–1973); Christian Democratic Party (1961–1969)
- Other political affiliations: Puebla Group (since 2019)
- Spouse: Georgina Núñez Reyes
- Parent(s): Agustín Insulza Fuentes; Ana Salinas Cordovez
- Education: University of Chile; University of Michigan; Latin American Faculty of Social Sciences
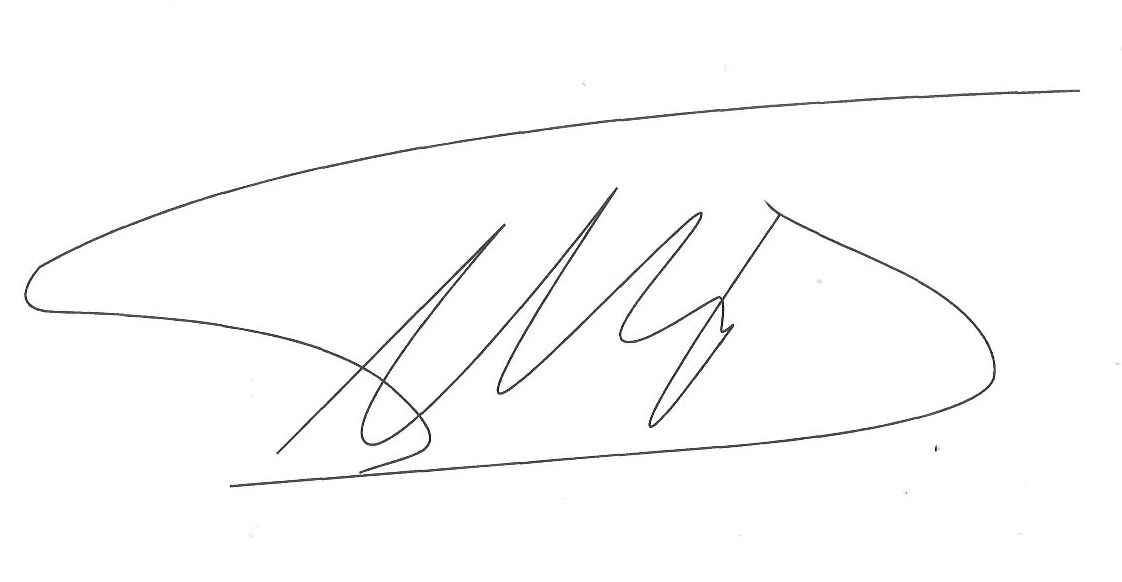
- Signature

José Miguel Insulza Salinas (born June 2, 1943) is a Chilean politician, lawyer, and academic serving as a senator for the Arica y Parinacota Region since 2018. He previously served as Minister of Foreign Affairs from 1994 to 1999 and Minister Secretary-General of the Presidency from 1999 to 2000 under president Eduardo Frei Ruiz-Tagle, as Minister of the Interior from 2000 to 2005 under president Ricardo Lagos, and as Secretary General of the Organization of American States from 2005 to 2015.

Insulza is nicknamed El Panzer in Chile, for his tank-like drive and reputation due to his ability to take political heat with little apparent damage.

== Early life and education ==
Insulza completed his primary and secondary education at St. George's College, an elite American English-language school in Santiago, Chile. He demonstrated an early interest in civil service while studying law at the University of Chile, serving as president of the Law Students Center, vice president of the University of Chile Student Federation (FECH), and President of the National Association of Student Unions (UFUCH). After graduating from law school, he obtained a graduate degree from the Latin American Social Sciences Faculty (FLACSO) and a Master of Arts in political science from the University of Michigan. He was professor of Political Theory at the University of Chile and of Political Science at the Catholic University in Chile until 1973.

== Career ==
=== Early beginnings ===
Insulza was a member of the Popular Unitary Action Movement (MAPU) from 1969 to 1973. He ran for deputy for the Third District of Santiago, Puente Alto, in the 1973 parliamentary election but was unsuccessful. He served as Political Advisor to the Chilean Ministry of Foreign Affairs and Director of the Diplomatic Academy of Chile in 1973.

=== Exile in Mexico ===
Following the 1973 Chilean coup d'état, Insulza was prohibited from re-entering Chile (he had been at an international conference in Paris at the time). He spent the next 15 years in exile, living first in Rome, Italy from 1974 to 1981 and then in Mexico from 1981 to 1988. There, he worked as a researcher, eventually becoming the Director of the United States Studies Institute at the Centro de Investigación y Docencia Económicas (CIDE). He also taught at the National Autonomous University of Mexico, the Universidad Iberoamericana, and the Diplomatic Studies Institute. He has written numerous publications in his field.

He joined the Socialist Party of Chile in 1985.

=== Return to Chile ===
Insulza returned to Chile in early 1988 and joined the Concertación coalition of left-leaning political parties as a member of the Socialist Party. Following the end of military rule, Insulza was appointed Chilean Ambassador for International Cooperation in 1990. He became Director of Multilateral Economic Affairs at the Ministry of Foreign Affairs and Vice President of the International Cooperation Agency (AGCI) some time later. He became a member of the Chilean Association of Political Science, the Bar Association, and the Chilean Council of International Relations.

On March 11, 1994, Insulza became Undersecretary of Foreign Affairs under president Eduardo Frei Ruiz-Tagle. On September 20, 1994, he rose to the position of Minister of Foreign Affairs.

Insulza quickly accepted the unfavorable and disputed ruling regarding the Laguna del Desierto dispute, which awarded the vast majority of the territory to Argentina.

He was a promoter of the controversial 1998 agreement regarding the Southern Patagonian Ice Field dispute which sought to redraw the boundary already defined 100 years ago by the surveyors of both countries, together with María Teresa Infante Caffi, then director of the DIFROL.

On June 22, 1999, he became Minister Secretary-General of the Presidency. On March 11, 2000, he took office as Minister of the Interior under president Ricardo Lagos.

=== Secretary General of the Organization of American States ===
Insulza was elected Secretary General of the Organization of American States on May 2, 2005, following Mexican Foreign Secretary Luis Ernesto Derbez's withdrawal from the race. (See 2005 Organization of American States Secretary General election.)

On January 5, 2007, Insulza criticized Venezuelan president Hugo Chávez's decision not to renew television channel RCTV's broadcast license (Chávez had accused the station of being a coup d'état instigator.) Three days later, Chávez responded to Insulza by calling for his resignation and referring to him as a pendejo—a Spanish profanity equivalent to "dumbass". Insulza later received the support of several OAS members, including the US, and Chávez conceded he had gone too far with his words. In April 2008, Chávez congratulated Insulza for stating in a presentation before the United States House of Representatives Subcommittee on the Western Hemisphere that there was no evidence linking Venezuela to terrorist groups.

Insulza openly stated his intention to run for President of Chile, but withdrew from the race on January 5, 2009 and vowed to continue as Secretary General of the OAS until the end of his mandate. He gave his support to Eduardo Frei Ruiz-Tagle as the Concertación candidate for president.

On March 24, 2010, Insulza—the sole candidate—was reelected (with the abstention of Bolivia) as OAS chief for another five-year term.

Insulza won the Washington Office on Latin America's prestigious Human Rights Award in 2008. In 2014 Insulza was awarded the prestigious Kalman H. Silvert Award presented by the Council on Hemispheric Affairs.

==== Criticism ====
As Secretary General, Insulza was criticized for not taking enough action against human rights abuses in the Americas. In 2008, the Human Rights Foundation started the "Inter-American Democratic Charter and Mr. Insulza" program, to inform Insulza every month of human rights abuses taking place in the Americas.

== Later career ==
In 2019, Insulza joined the inaugural meeting of the so-called Puebla Group in Buenos Aires, a conference of left-leaning political leaders.

== Links ==
- Biography at OAS site
- Insulza CV (OAS.org)
- (in Spanish) "Perfil de Insulza, futuro Secretario General de la OEA" (El Mercurio Online, Santiago)
- (grassrootsonline.org)

Political offices
| Preceded by Carlos Figueroa | Minister of Foreign Affairs; 1994-1999 | Succeeded by Juan Gabriel Valdés |
| Preceded by John Biehl | Minister Secretary-General of the Presidency; 1999-2000 | Succeeded by Álvaro García Hurtado |
| Preceded by Raúl Troncoso | Minister of the Interior; 2000-2005 | Succeeded by Francisco Vidal Salinas |
Diplomatic posts
| Preceded by Luigi R. Einaudi | Secretary General of the Organization of American States; 2005-2015 | Succeeded by Luis Almagro |
