= Raúl Troncoso =

Chilean politician (1935–2004)

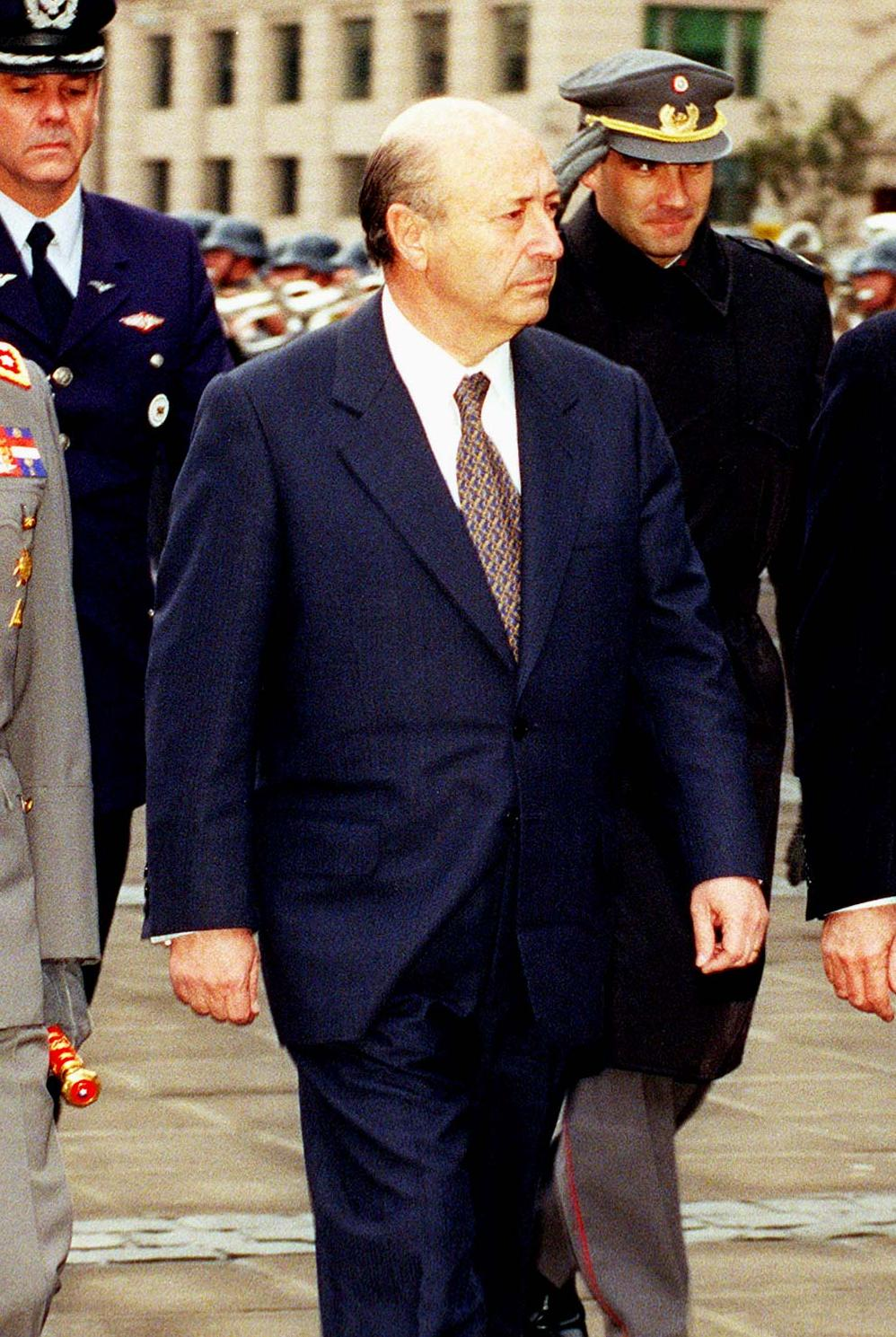

Minister of the Interior
- In office 1 August 1998 – 11 March 2000
- President: Eduardo Frei Ruíz-Tagle
- Preceded by: Carlos Figueroa Serrano
- Succeeded by: José Miguel Insulza

Minister of Denfense
- In office 16 January 1998 – 1 August 1998
- President: Eduardo Frei Ruíz-Tagle
- Preceded by: Edmundo Pérez Yoma
- Succeeded by: José Florencio Guzmán

Minister General Secretariat of Government
- In office 12 May 1965 – 4 November 1970
- President: Eduardo Frei Montalva
- Preceded by: Enrique Ortúzar
- Succeeded by: Jaime Suárez Bastidas

Personal details
- Born: 27 April 1935 Santiago, Chile
- Died: 28 November 2004 (aged 69) Santiago, Chile
- Party: Social Christian Conservative Party (?−1957); Christian Democratic Party (1957−2004)
- Children: Five
- Parent(s): Raúl Troncoso Ovalle; Teresa Castillo
- Education: Pontifical Catholic University of Chile (LL.B)
- Occupation: Politician
- Profession: Lawyer

Raúl Troncoso Castillo (27 April 1935−28 November 2004) was a Chilean politician and lawyer who served as Minister of the Interior, Minister of Denfense and as Minister General Secretariat of Government.

== Early life and education ==
Troncoso was the son of Raúl Troncoso Ovalle and Teresa Castillo Aránguiz, who was the sister of Sergio Castillo Aránguiz, Commander-in-Chief of the Chilean Army during the administration of Eduardo Frei Montalva, serving from 3 May 1968 to 2 October 1969.

He married María Josefina Keymer Aguirre, with whom he had five children: Raúl José, Ignacio, María Josefina, María Carolina, and Diego Sebastián.

He attended the St. Ignatius College, Santiago before studying law at the Pontifical Catholic University of Chile (PUC), where he distinguished himself as an outstanding student, athlete, and football player.

== Political career ==
=== Early career ===
Troncoso was initially a member of the Social Christian Conservative Party (PCSC), which merged with the National Falange in 1957 to form the Christian Democratic Party (PDC).

In 1960, he became president of the party's youth organization.

He played an active role in Eduardo Frei Montalva's successful 1964 presidential campaign and was subsequently appointed Secretary General of Government, serving from 12 May 1965 to 4 November 1970. At the time, the office had not yet been granted ministerial status, which it only acquired in 1976.

After the end of Frei Montalva's administration, Troncoso entered private legal practice with fellow Christian Democrat José Florencio Guzmán in Santiago.

During the military dictatorship of General Augusto Pinochet, he remained closely associated with the Frei family. Following the death of Eduardo Frei Montalva, he served as president of the Eduardo Frei Foundation from 1985 to 1990.

He was also a founding member and secretary-general of the Democratic Alliance, the coalition of opposition parties that later evolved into the Concertación.

=== Concertación governments ===
Following the return to democracy, Troncoso was appointed Ambassador of Chile to Italy, serving from 1990 to 1992. Upon his return to Chile, he became a member of the board of directors of BancoEstado.

In 1991, he nearly died after suffering a pulmonary embolism caused by tachycardia.

Widely regarded as one of Eduardo Frei Ruiz-Tagle's closest advisers, he was appointed Minister of National Defense in 1998 and later that year became Minister of the Interior, serving until 2000.

A practicing Catholic, Troncoso served on a committee organized by Chilean Cardinal Carlos Oviedo Cavada to raise funds for Pope John Paul II's visit to Cuba in the late 1990s.

He died on 28 November 2004, aged 69, at his home in Vitacura after suffering from stomach cancer, which had been diagnosed in late 2003.
