= Juan Villarzú =

Chilean politician

Minister Secretary-General of the Presidency
- In office 28 September 1996 – 1 August 1998
- President: Eduardo Frei Ruiz-Tagle
- Preceded by: Genaro Arriagada
- Succeeded by: John Biehl

Budget manager
- In office 12 September 1973 – January 1975
- President: Augusto Pinochet
- Preceded by: Mario Vergara Pérez
- Succeeded by: Juan Carlos Méndez

Personal details
- Born: 16 May 1944 (age 82) Arica, Chile
- Party: Christian Democratic Party (1962−present)
- Spouse(s): Margarita Gallo; Maria Olivia Ávalos
- Children: Three
- Parent(s): Juan Villarzú; Ilse J. Rohde
- Education: University of Chile (B.Sc); University of Chicago (M.Sc)
- Profession: Economist

Juan Rodolfo Villarzú Rohde (born 16 May 1944) is a Chilean politician who served as minister under Eduardo Frei Ruiz-Tagle government.

He earned a degree in business administration (ingeniería comercial), with concentrations in management and accounting, from the University of Chile, and later obtained a master's degree in economics from the University of Chicago.

Villarzú joined the Christian Democratic Party at the age of eighteen.

In 1995, he was diagnosed with Parkinson's disease, a condition he continued to manage while holding public office.

== Biography ==
Villarzú was the only surviving child of the second marriage of Juan Villarzú Burgoa, a nitrate industry worker who, following the collapse of the Chilean nitrate industry, managed a sulfur mine near Visviri. Through his frequent travels to La Paz, Bolivia, his father met Ilse Johanna Rohde, a German refugee who had fled World War II.

Villarzú attended the German School, first in Villa Alemana and later in Santiago, where he studied alongside, among others, José Joaquín Brunner.

In 1967, he married María Margarita Gallo Donoso, with whom he had three children: Rodrigo, Alejandra, and Andrea. The couple divorced in 1990. In 1992, he married María Olivia Ávalos Cisternas; their marriage ended in divorce in 2008.

== Public career ==
=== UP and Pinochet era ===
After returning from the United States, Villarzú became associated with the group of economists later known as the Chicago Boys, many of whom were affiliated with the consulting firm Gemines and contributed to El Ladrillo, the economic policy blueprint adopted by the military government following the overthrow of President Salvador Allende.

Following the 1973 Chilean coup d'état, Villarzú was appointed Director of the Budget Office in the Ministry of Finance, serving until January 1975. He resigned over disagreements with the military government on both economic and political matters.

He subsequently joined the World Bank in Washington, D.C., where he worked as an economist responsible for Mexico.

Returning to Chile in 1978, Villarzú became deputy general manager of Banco Concepción (later Corpbanca). He remained there until disagreements with the bank's shareholders led to his departure shortly before the economic crisis of the early 1980s.

=== Concertación ===
In the late 1980s, Villarzú began working as an independent consultant and joined the economic team of the Christian Democratic Party, collaborating with economist Alejandro Foxley on the government program of Concertación presidential candidate Patricio Aylwin.

Following the election of President Eduardo Frei Ruiz-Tagle in 1993, Villarzú —who had been widely mentioned as a potential finance minister— was instead appointed chief executive officer of Codelco before later becoming Minister Secretary-General of the Presidency.

During the administration of President Ricardo Lagos (2000–2006), he returned as chief executive officer of Codelco. At the beginning of his tenure, he faced declining copper prices and pressure from the Ministry of Finance to increase transfers to the state while pursuing plans to double the company's value. Conditions improved during his final two years as copper prices rose, and legislation establishing a specific mining tax was enacted, a measure for which he was one of the principal advocates.

His name was considered for another term as head of Codelco following the inauguration of President Michelle Bachelet in 2006, but he was ultimately replaced by fellow Christian Democrat José Pablo Arellano and returned to the private sector.

In early 2013, Villarzú expressed interest in seeking a Senate seat representing the Antofagasta Region in that year's 2013 Chilean parliamentary election, although he ultimately did not become a candidate.
