= José Florencio Guzmán =

Chilean politician (1929–2017)

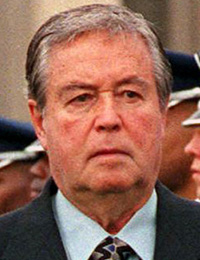

Ambassador of Chile to Argentina
- In office 1 July 1999 – 11 March 2000
- President: Eduardo Frei Ruiz-Tagle
- Preceded by: Edmundo Pérez Yoma
- Succeeded by: Jorge Arrate

Minister of National Defense
- In office 1 August 1998 – 22 June 1999
- President: Eduardo Frei Ruiz-Tagle
- Preceded by: Raúl Troncoso
- Succeeded by: Edmundo Pérez Yoma

Superintendent of Banks and Financial Institutions of Chile
- In office 11 March 1994 – 31 July 1998
- President: Eduardo Frei Ruiz-Tagle
- Preceded by: Himself
- Succeeded by: Ernesto Livacic

Superintendent of Banks and Financial Institutions of Chile
- In office 11 March 1990 – 11 March 1994
- President: Patricio Aylwin
- Preceded by: Guillermo Ramírez Vilardell
- Succeeded by: Himself

Personal details
- Born: 22 June 1929 Santiago, Chile
- Died: 16 September 2017 (aged 88)
- Party: Christian Democratic Party (1967); Social Christian Conservative Party
- Spouse: María Angélica González
- Children: Four
- Education: Pontifical Catholic University of Chile (LL.B)
- Profession: Lawyer

José Florencio Guzmán Correa (22 June 1929 – 16 September 2017) was a Chilean lawyer and politician who served as Minister of National Defense from 1 August 1998 until 22 June 1999.

His tenure as Minister of National Defense was largely dominated by the arrest of Augusto Pinochet in London. Tensions between the government and the Chilean military over the affair ultimately led to his replacement by Edmundo Pérez Yoma, who maintained closer relations with both the Chilean Army and Pinochet.

After leaving the cabinet, Guzmán was appointed Ambassador of Chile to Argentina, serving until May 2000.

== Biography ==
Guzmán was the son of engineer Florencio Guzmán Larraín and María Luisa Correa. He was the brother of actress Delfina Guzmán, filmmaker María Teresa Guzmán, and sociologist Gerardo Guzmán.

He spent his childhood in a traditional mansion in downtown Santiago, owned by his maternal grandfather, Pedro Correa Ovalle, a former Conservative Party senator for Talca and Linares.

Guzmán attended Cardinal Newman College before completing his secondary education at the Colegio de los Sagrados Corazones de Santiago. In 1945, two years before completing secondary school, he joined the Catholic Student Youth (Juventud Estudiantil Católica, JEC).

He began studying law at the Pontifical Catholic University of Chile before transferring the following year to the University of Chile.

=== Personal life ===
Guzmán married María Cristina Gutiérrez, with whom he had five children: María Cristina, Pilar, Soledad, Gerardo, and Luisa. Following their separation, he married María Angélica González Soulat.

== Political career ==
In 1953, together with Gustavo Serrano and Alberto Zaldívar, Guzmán established a law firm in downtown Santiago. He was later recruited by Finance Minister Carlos Vial Espantoso to serve as his private secretary because of his affiliation with the Social Christian Conservative movement.

He subsequently joined the Superintendency of Corporations, Insurance Companies and Stock Exchanges, headed by Julio Chaná.

In 1957, he joined the Christian Democratic Party.

Following the election of President Eduardo Frei Montalva in 1964, Guzmán was appointed Superintendent of Corporations. In 1968, Finance Minister Andrés Zaldívar appointed him Undersecretary of Finance, a position in which he dealt with the Tacnazo military uprising over salary demands in 1969. Later that year, he returned to the Superintendency.

After Salvador Allende assumed the presidency in 1970, Guzmán returned to private legal practice while also teaching at the University of Chile.

=== Concertación ===
Following Chile's return to democracy, Guzmán served as Superintendent of Banks and Financial Institutions from 1990 to 1998 before being appointed Minister of National Defense, serving from 1998 to 1999.

As superintendent, he oversaw major financial reforms, including the Banking Law and the resolution of Chile's subordinated debt issue.

He later became a member of the Senior Public Management Council, the body responsible for selecting senior officials for Chile's public administration.
