= Edmundo Pérez Yoma =

Chilean politician

Edmundo Jaime Pérez Yoma
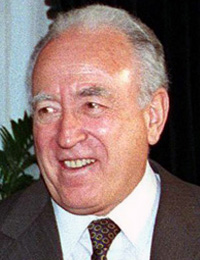

Minister of the Interior
- In office 8 March 2008 – 11 March 2010
- Appointed by: Michelle Bachelet
- Preceded by: Felipe Harboe Bascuñán (interim)
- Succeeded by: Rodrigo Hinzpeter

Minister of National Defense
- In office 22 June 1999 – 11 March 2000
- Appointed by: Eduardo Frei Ruiz-Tagle
- Preceded by: José Florencio Guzmán Correa
- Succeeded by: Mario Fernández Baeza
- In office 11 March 1994 – 16 January 1998
- Appointed by: Eduardo Frei Ruiz-Tagle
- Preceded by: Patricio Rojas
- Succeeded by: Raúl Troncoso Castillo

Personal details
- Born: 10 January 1939 (age 87) Antofagasta, Chile
- Party: Christian Democrat
- Spouse: Paz Vergara Larraín
- Children: Six
- Education: University of Washington

Edmundo Jaime Pérez Yoma (born 10 January 1939 Antofagasta) is a Chilean politician from the Christian Democrat Party of Chile. He was twice the Minister of Defense during the administration of President Eduardo Frei Ruiz-Tagle, and he served as the Minister of the Interior for President Michelle Bachelet's administration.

Pérez Yoma is the son of Edmundo Pérez Zujovic, the assassinated minister under President Eduardo Frei Montalva, father of President Frei Ruiz-Tagle. As a boy, he came to Santiago, the capital, with his family, enrolling in Saint George's College and then the University of Chile, where for two years he studied engineering. Later, he moved to Seattle to attend the University of Washington, from which he earned a Bachelor of Arts in 1962. Pérez Yoma then returned to Chile, marrying Paz Vergara Larraín in 1965, with whom he has had six children.

In the following years, while working in business, Pérez Yoma was critical of Popular Unity, the coalition of parties that brought the socialist Salvador Allende to power in 1970. In 1988, he served as national advisor for the Christian Democrat Party (PDC) and in 1989, he managed the senatorial campaign of Eduardo Frei Ruiz-Tagle. In 1991, he was named president of the Defense Commission of his party. In the 1990s, he was president on the board of Petrox and Chilectra Metropolitana, oil and electricity companies, respectively. In 1993, he was executive secretary of Frei's presidential campaign.

In the 2010s Pérez Yoma was fined for theft of water in Petorca.

== Political career ==
=== Frei Ruiz-Tagle administration ===
Due to Pérez Yoma's closeness with the army, President Eduardo Frei Ruiz-Tagle—a personal friend due to the closeness of their fathers—appointed him Minister of Defense in 1994. In this role, he had the task of managing relations with General Augusto Pinochet and preparing the transfer of command of the army from his hands. In contrast with his predecessor, Patricio Rojas Pérex Yoma maintained good personal and professional relations with Pinochet, coming to an agreement that his successor in command would be Ricardo Izurieta.

Another situation that Pérez Yoma faced was the removal from the direction of the Carabineros of General Rodolfo Stange, who refused to resign after having been accused of dereliction of duty regarding the Caso Degollados.

Within the Frei administration, Pérez Yoma was in conflict with Minister of Public Works Ricardo Lagos. Lagos refused to assent to the creation of Punta Peuca, a prison built specifically for the military convicts detained for violations of human rights, whose first occupants were General Manuel Contreras and Brigadier Pedro Espinoza for the murder of former Foreign Minister Orlando Letelier.

On January 16, 1998, Pérez Yoma left office to become the ambassador to Argentina On June 22, 1999, he returned to the administration as Minister of National Defense. In that stint, he created the Mesa de Diálogo (English: Bargaining Table), a body that sought to resolve problems concerning the violation of human rights during the military regime.
