= Genaro Arriagada =

Chilean politician

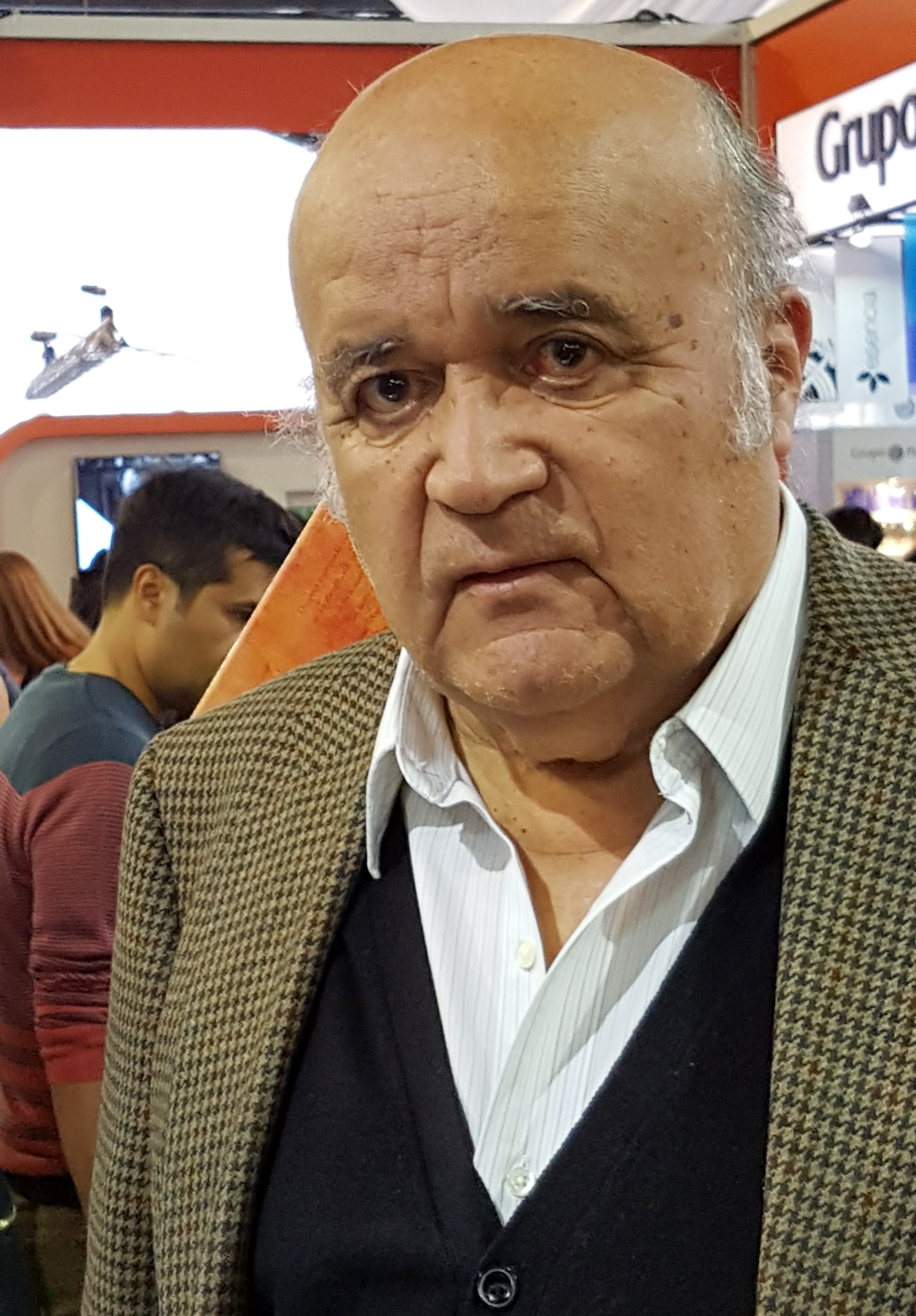

Minister Secretary-General of the Presidency
- In office 11 March 1994 – 26 September 1996
- President: Eduardo Frei Ruíz-Tagle
- Preceded by: Edgardo Boeninger
- Succeeded by: Juan Villarzú

Personal details
- Born: 26 January 1943 (age 83) Santiago, Chile
- Party: Radical Party (1958−1963); Christian Democratic Party (1963−2021)
- Spouse: Ana María Urzúa
- Children: Two
- Education: University of Chile (LL.B); Harvard University (PhD)
- Profession: Lawyer

Genaro Luis Arriagada Herrera (born 26 January 1943) is a Chilean politician who served as minister.

In December 2021, after 58 years of membership, he resigned from Christian Democracy.

== Biography ==
Arriagada attended the Internado Nacional Barros Arana before studying law at the University of Chile, graduating in 1965. He later pursued further studies at Harvard University and the Smithsonian Institution in the United States.

Between 1978 and 1979, he was a research fellow at the Woodrow Wilson International Center for Scholars in Washington, D.C.. He returned to the institution in January and February 2007 as a Public Policy Scholar. In 1990, he was a fellow at the Institute of Politics of the Harvard Kennedy School.

Throughout his academic career, Arriagada has taught courses, delivered lectures, and participated in seminars at institutions including Harvard University, Princeton University, the University of Notre Dame, Columbia University, Georgetown University, Duke University, American University, Johns Hopkins University, the University of Salamanca, the Council on Foreign Relations, the Carnegie Endowment for International Peace, the Chicago Council on Global Affairs, and others.

In 2005, he was appointed to the board of trustees of the Universidad de Las Américas (UDLA), and in 2008 became a Senior Non-Resident Fellow at the Inter-American Dialogue in Washington, D.C.

Arriagada made his literary debut in 2014 with the novel Trotsky y la Marilyn. Reviewing the work, literary critic José Promis argued that it was difficult to classify as conventional fiction, describing it instead as a politically and historically engaged work that readers would approach more as an essay or historical document than as a novel.

== Political career ==
Arriagada joined the Radical Party in 1958 and remained a member until 1961, when the party entered the government of President Jorge Alessandri. In 1963, despite being an agnostic, he joined the Christian Democratic Party, remaining a member until announcing his resignation in 2021.

He participated in Radomiro Tomic's 1970 presidential campaign. He later served as deputy director of the Christian Democratic Party's 1973 parliamentary campaign, a member of its political commission from 1974 to 1985, and as party vice president from 1989 to 1991. He was also executive secretary of the Concertación and of the No campaign, serving as campaign manager for the opposition campaign that defeated Augusto Pinochet in the 1988 Chilean national plebiscite.

He also worked on Eduardo Frei Ruiz-Tagle's 1993 presidential campaign, coordinating the preparation of the candidate's government program. During Frei's administration, Arriagada served as Minister Secretary-General of the Presidency from 1994 to 1996, as presidential representative and coordinator of the National Commission on Public Ethics in 1994, as ambassador-at-large responsible for negotiating and coordinating preparations for the 2nd Summit of the Americas held in Santiago in 1998, and as special envoy to the hemisphere's heads of state in 1997. He later served as Ambassador of Chile to the United States from 1998 to 1999.

During the 1999–2000 Chilean presidential election, Arriagada managed the first-round presidential campaign of Ricardo Lagos, who narrowly led Joaquín Lavín in the initial vote. For the runoff campaign, he was succeeded by fellow Christian Democrat Soledad Alvear.

He has also served as a member of the board of BancoEstado (2000–2006) and as a researcher at CIEPLAN, ICHEH, FLACSO, SUR, the Economic Commission for Latin America and the Caribbean (ECLAC), and the Inter-American Development Bank.
