= Jorge Lavandero =

Chilean politician

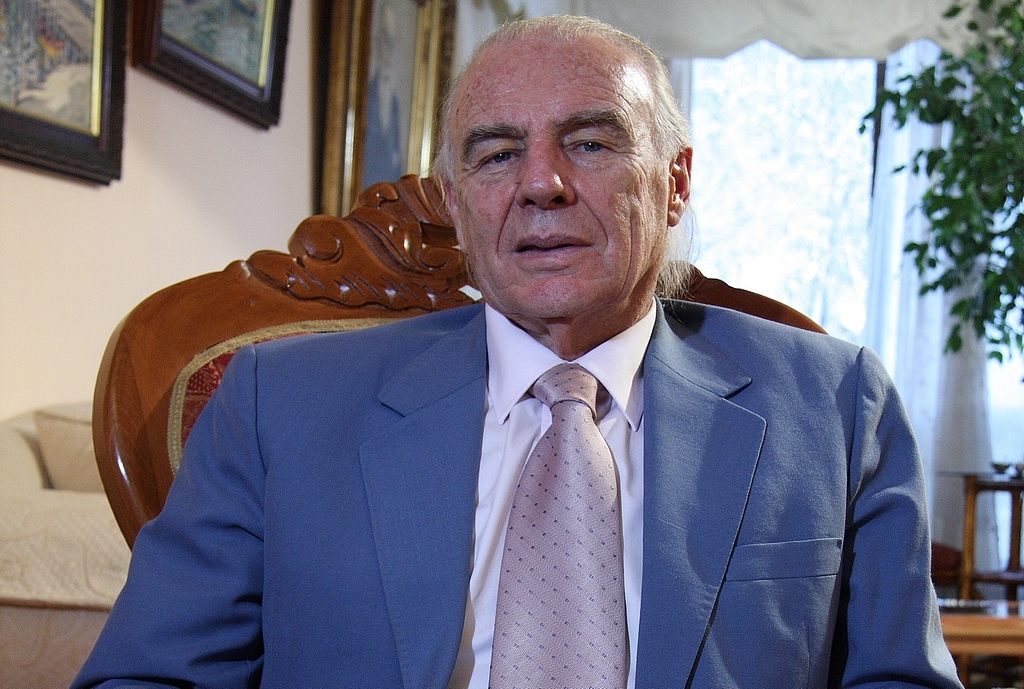

Member of the Senate of Chile
- In office 11 March 1990 – 9 August 2005
- Preceded by: Creation of the Circumscription
- Succeeded by: Guillermo Vásquez
- Constituency: Araucanía Region (15th Circumscription)
- In office 15 May 1973 – 21 September 1973
- Preceded by: Ricardo Ferrando
- Succeeded by: Dissolution of the Circumscription
- Constituency: Bío Bío and Araucanía

Member of the Chamber of Deputies
- In office 15 May 1957 – 15 May 1973
- Constituency: Araucanía Region

Personal details
- Born: 6 May 1930 (age 96) Renaico, Chile
- Party: Agrarian Labor Party (–1958); National Democratic Party (1958–1963); New Democratic Left (1963); Christian Democratic Party (1963–2005)
- Children: Ten
- Education: University of Chile (LL.B)
- Occupation: Politician
- Profession: Lawyer

Jorge Exequiel Lavandero Illanes (born 6 May 1930) is a Chilean politician who was a member of the Senate of Chile.

He was a member of the Agrarian Labor Party, the National Democratic Party, and the Christian Democratic Party (PDC).

He served as senator for the 15th Senatorial District of the Araucanía Region for four consecutive terms between 1990 and 2006, as senator for the Eighth Provincial Grouping (Bío-Bío, Malleco and Cautín) in 1973, and as a member of the Chamber of Deputies for the 21st Departmental Grouping (Temuco, Lautaro, Imperial, Pitrufquén and Villarrica) for four consecutive terms between 1957 and 1973.

== Early life and family ==
Lavandero was born in Renaico, Araucanía Region, on 6 May 1930. He was the son of Jorge Lavandero Eyzaguirre and Rebeca Illanes Benítez. His father served as a senator between 1953 and 1961.

He married Celia Marcela Masson Catton, with whom he had three children: Jorge Carlos, Carolina, and Felipe. He later married Ximena Risopatrón Larraín, with whom he had six children: Paula, Nicolás, Sebastián, Diego, Valentina, and Catalina. Since 12 June 2010, he has been married to social worker Natalia Lizama Lovera.

== Professional career ==
He completed his primary education at the Sacred Hearts School and his secondary education at the San Ignacio School in Santiago. He later entered the Faculty of Law at the University of Chile. While studying, he worked as a journalist, collaborating with the newspaper La Opinión of Santiago in 1964.

He was president, owner, and columnist of the newspaper Fortín Mapocho, which during its second period was published between 1978 and 1991. The newspaper was temporarily suspended for several months in 1984 and 1987.

Throughout his life, he was engaged in agricultural and livestock activities on his farm El Litre, located on the Victoria–Curacautín railway branch. He formed a partnership with Lorenzo de la Maza for the operation of the San Lorenzo farm in Selva Oscura. He was also a partner and manager of the company Jorge Lavandero y Cía., involved in livestock brokerage, agricultural products, and real estate, and participated in the operation of a ranch in Argentina.

== Political career ==
Lavandero began his political activity by joining the Agrarian Labor Party, formed by supporters of Carlos Ibáñez del Campo, where he was elected president of its youth wing. From 1956, he was a member of the National Party (1956–1958), formed by groups of Ibáñez supporters.

During one of his terms as deputy, he was elected councillor of the Public Employees and Journalists Pension Fund. In 1961, he was appointed head of the parliamentary caucus of the National Democratic Party (PADENA). In 1963, he joined the Christian Democratic Party.

In early 1982, during the military regime led by Augusto Pinochet, he co-founded a closed joint-stock company named Proyecto de Desarrollo Nacional (PRODEN), together with members of the Radical Party, the Christian Democratic Party, the National Party, the Communist Party, and the Socialist Party, as well as social and trade union organizations such as the Workers' Command.

Together with Gabriel Valdés, he participated in a march supporting the visit to Chile of U.S. Senator Edward Kennedy in January 1986, and in a demonstration led by Eduardo Frei Montalva at the Caupolicán Theatre in 1980 to protest against the approval of the Constitution. During his parliamentary work, he played a role in the discussion and approval of several laws, including legislation establishing a mining royalty.

On 10 January 2005, the Supreme Tribunal of the Christian Democratic Party suspended his party membership. He was stripped of parliamentary immunity by a ruling of the Supreme Court on 16 March 2005.
