= Rodrigo Peñailillo =

Chilean politician

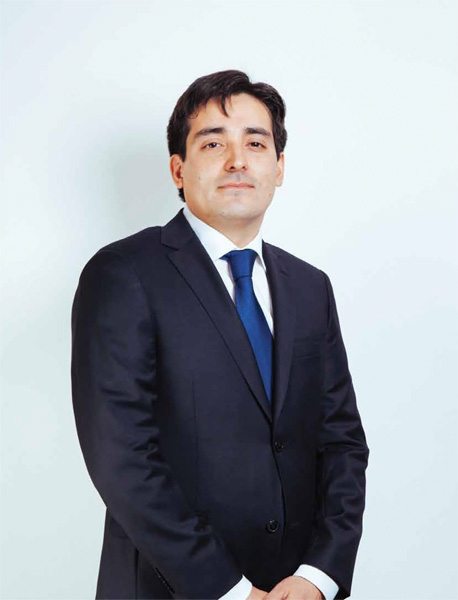

Minister of the Interior
- In office 11 March 2014 – 11 May 2015
- President: Michelle Bachelet
- Preceded by: Andrés Chadwick
- Succeeded by: Jorge Burgos

Personal details
- Born: 12 December 1973 (age 52) Concepción, Chile
- Party: Party for Democracy (2002–2021)
- Children: 2
- Parent(s): Hernán Peñailillo; Rosa Briceño
- Education: University of Bío-Bío (B.Sc); Complutense University of Madrid (M.Sc)
- Occupation: Researcher, Scholar and Politician
- Profession: Economist

Rodrigo Julián Peñailillo Briceño (born 12 December 1973) is a former Minister of the Interior of Chile.

From 2002 to 2005, Peñailillo served as governor of Arauco Province, a position he left to join Michelle Bachelet's presidential campaign. Following her election, he became chief of staff at the Palace of La Moneda. During Bachelet's second presidential campaign, Peñailillo was one of her closest advisers.

== Political career ==
=== Student leadership ===
In 1993, Peñailillo began his involvement in student politics, becoming a member of his degree program's student council. In late 1995, he was elected president of the Student Federation of the University of Bío-Bío (Concepción campus), a position he held for two consecutive terms. During his time at the university, he organized a student strike and led one of the first large-scale student demonstrations since Chile's return to democracy.

As a student leader, he faced criticism for his political proximity to the government, then led by the Concertación centre-left coalition.

In this capacity, he represented all traditional universities from southern Chile within the Confederation of Chilean Students (CONFECH). In 1997, he actively participated in discussions surrounding the proposed framework law for higher education.

These discussions sparked significant university mobilizations against the government's proposal. Peñailillo reached an agreement with the government, but it was rejected by Rodrigo Roco, president of the University of Chile Student Federation, resulting in a split within CONFECH. Sixteen years later, Peñailillo and Roco would belong to the same political coalition and serve under the same administration.

=== Concertación era (1998–2010) ===
He moved to the capital city Santiago in 1998, and four years later he joined the Party for Democracy (PPD).

In late 90s, he completed a professional internship at the Production Development Corporation (CORFO) and later worked at Fundación Chile 21, a think tank associated with Ricardo Lagos.

When Lagos launched his presidential campaign in 1999, Peñailillo worked in field operations under the direction of campaign coordinator Francisco Vidal. After Lagos was elected president, he joined the Undersecretariat for Regional and Administrative Development (Subdere), then headed by Vidal. Within the Party for Democracy (PPD), he ran on a slate alongside Harold Correa in the party's youth elections and was elected national president of the PPD Youth in 2000.

On 28 December 2001, President Ricardo Lagos appointed Peñailillo governor of Arauco Province, making him, at age 27, the youngest person to hold the office at the time.

As governor, he was one of the Chilean government's representatives in the Mapuche conflict. During his tenure, he developed relations with Mapuche leaders and implemented the Indigenous Development Area (ADI), receiving positive assessments from municipal authorities in the province. He also faced a number of protests and filed eleven legal complaints.

Peñailillo resigned as governor on 3 January 2005 to join the presidential campaign of Michelle Bachelet. After Bachelet's election, he became chief of staff during her first administration (2006–2010), coordinating the president's agenda, regional visits and media communications.

Following the end of Bachelet's first administration in 2010, Peñailillo moved to Spain, where he earned a master's degree in Political Analysis from the Complutense University of Madrid.
