= Tricel =

Irish Engineering Company

- Company type: Group of privately owned companies
- Founded: 1973
- Founders: Anne Stack & Con Stack
- Headquarters: Killarney, Ireland
- Number of locations: Ireland, UK, France, Denmark, Sweden.
- Key people: Mike Stack - CEO
- Number of employees: 650
- Divisions: Water Storage; Environmental; Construction; Distribution
- Subsidiaries: Tricel (Portsmouth) Limited; Tricel (Westin) Limited; Finol Oils Limited; Tricel (Gloucester) Limited; Tricel Composites (GB) Limited; Tricel Composites (NI) Limited; Tricel (Killarney) Unlimited Company; Nicholson Plastics Limited; Tricel Poitier SAS; Biokube Denmark; Magnum Industries Europe Ltd; Tricel (Gothenburg) AB; Edincare Pumps; Lowara Distribution Ireland
- Website: Tricel.eu

Tricel is a global engineering company headquartered in Killarney in County Kerry, Ireland. Tricel's four core divisions are Water Storage, Environmental, Construction, and Distribution. It has production sites in ten locations in Northern Europe, including Ireland, Britain Denmark, Sweden and France, which services customers in over 50 countries. As of 2012, Tricel employs 650 people and exports 75% of its products worldwide.

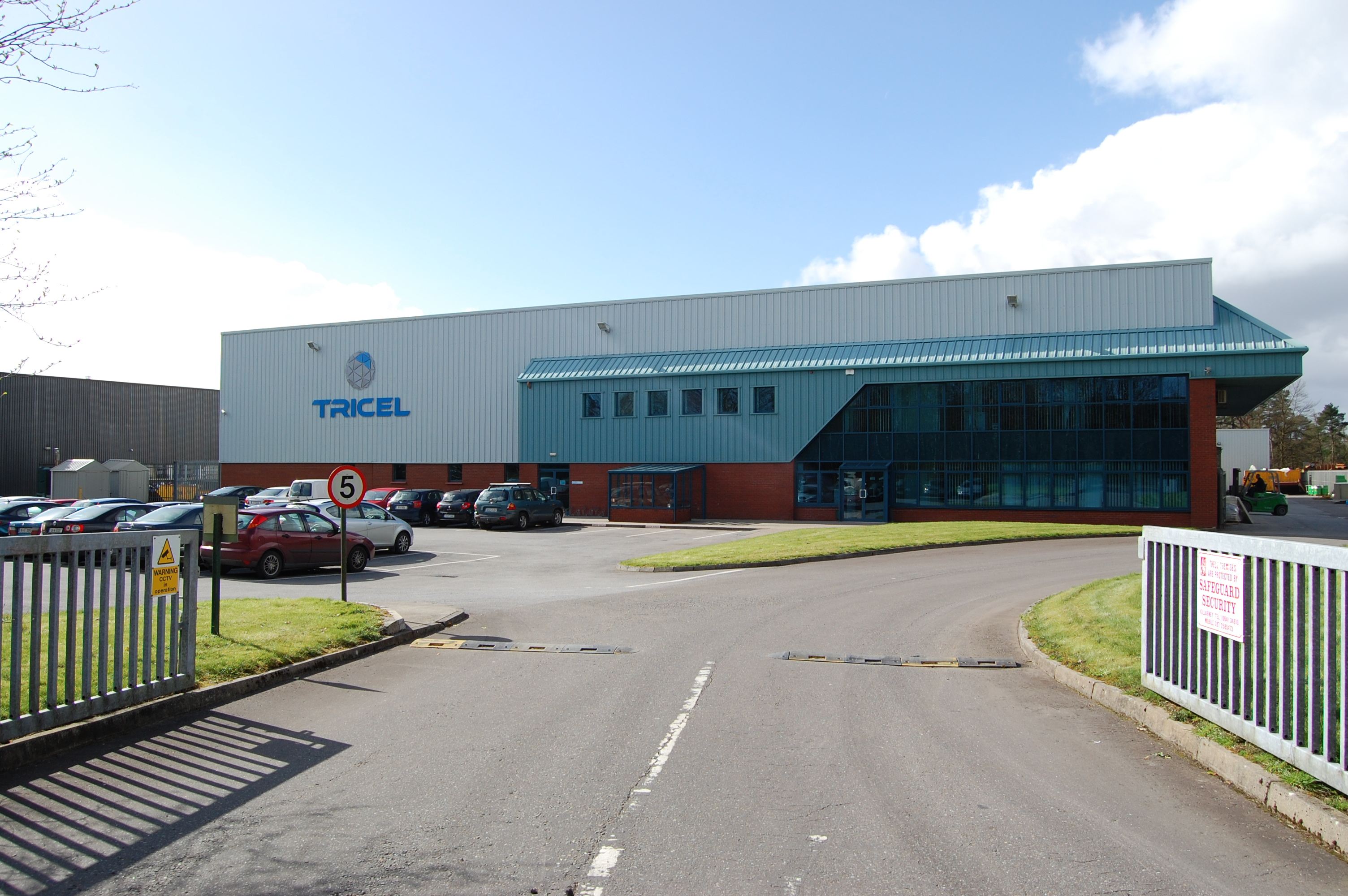
Tricel Killarney

== Rebranding to Tricel ==
The Tricel brand was established in 2002 as KMG expanded into new markets and was already an established name in a number of countries. Tricel was awarded French and German trading licences in 2011 and 2012, respectively. Due to the growing success of KMG's sub-division Tricel, on 28 March 2014 Killarney Manufacturing Group, headed by its founding company, Killarney Plastics, underwent a rebrand which saw companies within the groups existing structure renamed to Tricel.

== Companies rebranding ==
The companies included in the rebrand include: Killarney Plastics, now Tricel (Killarney); Fibreglass Sales, now Tricel (Newry) Ltd.; Gloucester Composites, now Tricel (Gloucester) Ltd.; and Tricel, now Tricel Poitiers SAS.

Tricel Headquarters

== History ==
Killarney Plastics was founded on 1 February 1973 by Anne and Con Stack in Killarney. Con had previously been involved in setting up Ross Products for the local health board. Ross Products manufactured cardboard boxes and traded in the town for over 30 years. Killarney Plastics started off from a small lane in Killarney, manufacturing composite and fibreglass (GRP) products which were still relatively new to the Irish market. The company also manufactured a range of products including boats and building products for people in the locality.

== Killarney Plastics ==
To accommodate increased business, a new site was acquired and a small factory built in the early 1980s, also in Killarney. It was then the company started to develop its own range of products such as water-storage tanks and meter enclosures. By the early 1990s the company had expanded its range of water-storage tanks and meter enclosures and its first export sales were sent to the UK and Europe. This trend continued and soon after Killarney Plastics was being awarded contracts for Irish and U.K. utility companies such as the ESB and Bord Gáis (now Ervia). Tricel (Killarney) now employ's 195 people at its main manufacturing site located just outside Killarney.

== Growth and formation of the KMG Group ==
Tricel (Gloucester), previously under the name of Gloucester Composites, was established in 1994 to establish a base in the UK. The function of this business was to manufacture a specific amount of products for the U.K market. Fibreglass Sales, now Tricel (Newry), was then established to distribute raw materials in Northern Ireland in 1997. As a direct result, Killarney Manufacturing Group was established in 1998 to integrate all three companies. In 1999 KMG completed its first acquisition, Technotrak, which allowed the group to diversify into the design and manufacture of civil and road safety products.

At the end of 1999 KMG acquired two of the UK's water tank manufacturers, Dewey Waters and Nicholson Plastics. Dewey Waters, based in Bristol, was formed in 1956 and Nicholson Plastics with bases in Scotland and London was formed in 1968. As the size of the company had doubled, a R&D centre and advanced manufacturing facility was constructed in Ballyspillane Industrial Estate, Killarney by the end of 1999.

== Diversification ==
As part of the KMG Group diversification strategy, the group expanded into the environmental sector. A new division called Tricel was formed in 2002. Tricel was originally established to focus on the sewage treatment market, initially in Ireland and the UK and thereafter in Europe and the USA. In 2005, the KMG Group acquired A.C. Plastic Industries, a UK manufacturer of water and fire sprinkler tanks. A.C. Plastic Industries Limited was formed in 1958. The company already had business in supplying water tanks to the Middle East and North Africa which further diversified the company.

Tricel Novo wastewater treatment systems

== Cancelled Acquisition ==
In 2007, the KMG Group negotiated the purchase of the GRP Cold Water Tanks section from the Balmoral Group, a Scottish-based manufacturer. The merger was debated by the Office of Fair Trading and referred to the Competition Commission. However, it was ruled that it would reduce the competitiveness of the GRP cold water tank market in the UK. The deal was subsequently abandoned.

== Recent Developments ==
- 2011 - In early 2011, the KMG Group was granted a French Government Licence for its Tricel Sewage Treatment Systems. As a result, a European factory was opened in Poitiers, France to manufacture the Tricel waste water treatment systems for the French market, which has created 15 new jobs.
- 2012 - In 2012, KMG Group added a new sand polishing filtration system called Sandcel to their Tricel range. This is for the Irish market. Tricel was also awarded the allgemeine bauaufsichtliche Zulassung des DIBt, the German Certification to sell Tricel wastewater treatment systems in Germany.
- 2013 - In March 2013 Cavus, a range of recycled structural chamber systems and access covers was launched by KMG company Gloucester Composites Limited.
- 2014 - In March 2014 KMG headed by its founding company Killarney Plastics underwent a rebrand which saw companies within the groups existing structure renamed to Tricel. The new companies in this rebranding venture included: Killarney Plastics, now Tricel (Killarney); Fibreglass Sales (UK) Ltd., now called Tricel (Newry) Ltd.; Gloucester Composites Ltd., now called Tricel (Gloucester) Ltd.; and finally Tricel, now called Tricel Poitiers SAS.
- 2014 - In 2014 Tricel Novo attained the Benor Certificate (Belgian licence) for their wastewater-treatment plants.
- 2015 - In May 2015, Minister for Jobs, Enterprise and Innovation, Richard Bruton announces the creation of 100 new jobs at Tricel. 40 of these are to be situated in the company's headquarters in Killarney. The new jobs, including graduate positions, will bolster the existing workforce of 270 based in Ireland, UK and France over the next 18 months and will strengthen operations in management, engineering, R&D, product development, marketing and manufacturing. The 40 new jobs in the Killarney HQ will be worth an extra €2.4 million to the local economy.
  Sectional Water Tank Installation
- 2015 - In September 2015, Tricel announced the acquisition of CE certified Puraflo and the Platinum range of sewage treatment systems from Bord Na Móna. The purchase includes the assets, rights, trademarks and intellectual property related to the Puraflo and Platinum range. Puraflo is a peat fibre system that is sustainable and uses little to no energy to operate. Tricel has entered into a long-term supply agreement with Bord Na Móna for the supply of the peat fibre which is key to the functioning of the system.
- 2015 - In October 2015, Tricel announced the acquisition of Finol Oils who are located in Dublin, Ireland. Finol Oil provides lubricant and maintenance products across a wide range of industries including Automotive, Commercial, Agriculture, Construction, Marine, Motorcycle, Industrial and Food manufacturing, further diversifying Tricel's product portfolio.
- 2016 - Fiberglass Supplies (Leeds) Ltd., a specialist fibreglass company, were acquired by Tricel in January 2016. The company is based in West Yorkshire and was founded in the 1970s. The acquisition significantly increased the portfolio of fibreglass products available from Tricel.
- 2016 - In May 2016, Tricel was awarded another Agrément from the French Government. This Agrément refers to the 'Seta' - a compact filter wastewater treatment system which uses coconut hairs to treat wastewater. This Agrément allows Tricel to offer this product in the French market.
- 2017 - In September, Fiberglass Supplies Leeds and Glasplies merged into Tricel Composites (GB) Ltd, and Tricel (Newry) rebranded to Tricel Composites (NI) Ltd. Along with the successful launch of Tricel Composites, the group also acquired Action Pumps Ltd, a UK based company. Ongoing growth throughout the company resulted in over 110 new employees. Tricel also achieved the French Agreement for the Seta Simplex, along with a French Agreement for the Novo pumped system. The company's position in the French market is now firmly secured with the establishment of Tricel Avignon, which is now assembling the full range of Tricel treatment systems and supplying to the French market.
- 2020 Tricel have launched Engineering tools to help in the specification of cold water storage tanks which can be used across a wide selection of industry sectors. Tools developed include a Cold water storage tank capacity calculator to aid calculating the correct water capacity options for different housing types including: Domestic housing, hospitals, hostels, factories, offices, small commercial premises, hotels, guesthouses and schools. The second calculator tool developed for the water storage industry is a water storage tank size calculator to calculate what size tank will be required when entering the volume of water needed to service a building. In May Tricel acquired Associated Pumps in Cork, Associated Pumps are a distributor of Grundfos products.
- 2022 Tricel acquired Biokube in Denmark. This company is focused on the Wastewater market in the Nordic countries.
- 2023 Tricel acquired Edincare Pumps in the UK. The firm provides pumping solutions and services to the water industry.
- 2024 Tricel acquired Magnum Industries Europe Ltd. The firm supplys composite manufacturing equipment.
- 2025 Tricel acquired Lowara Distribution Ireland, an exclusive distributor of Lowara products in the Republic of Ireland.
- 2025 Tricel acquired Rana Miljöteknik. The firm provides Waste Water Solutions and services in Sweden.
