= Edgardo Böeninger =

Chilean politician (1925–2009)

Edgardo Boeninger
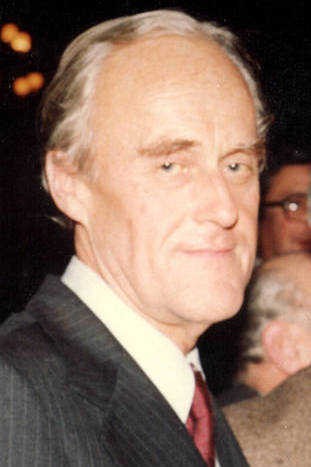

Member of the Senate
- In office 11 March 1998 – 11 March 2006
- Appointed by: Eduardo Frei Ruíz-Tagle
- Preceded by: Sergio Fernández Fernández
- Succeeded by: Dissolution of the position

Minister Secretary-General of the Presidency
- In office 11 March 1990 – 11 March 1994
- President: Patricio Aylwin
- Preceded by: Jorge Ballerino

Head of the University of Chile
- In office 1969–1973
- Preceded by: Ruy Barboza
- Succeeded by: César Ruíz Danyau

Personal details
- Born: 23 August 1925 Santiago, Chile
- Died: 13 September 2009 (aged 84) Santiago, Chile
- Party: Christian Democratic Party
- Spouse: Marta Gómez Maira
- Children: Two
- Education: The Grange School, Santiago; Instituto Nacional General José Miguel Carrera
- Alma mater: Pontifical Catholic University of Chile (BA); University of Chile (MA); University of California, Los Angeles (PhD)
- Profession: Economist

Edgardo Boeninger Kausel (23 August 1925 − 13 September 2009) was a Chilean politician who served as minister.

== Biography ==
=== Early life ===
Born in Santiago de Chile as Edgar Arnold Dagmar (?) Hanz (Hans?) Heinz Böninger Kausel, his parents were Edgar Böninger and Isabel Kausel, who married in October 1924. He had no siblings. When he was ten, his mother left the house tired of a violent husband, so since then Boeninger lived in pensions. His father also left home when he was a teenager.

As a child attended The Grange School, Santiago. Then he was a member of the Instituto Nacional General José Miguel Carrera and later at the Alonso de Ercilla Institute in Santiago, belonging to the Congregation of the Marist Brothers, where he would finish the High School in 1941.

He studied civil engineering at the Pontifical Catholic University of Chile, obtaining his Bachelor of Arts in 1950.

He actively devoted himself to teaching at the university where he studied, as a professor of geometry and stability at the Faculty of Architecture. Then, in 1955−1960, he finished his Master of Arts in economy at the University of Chile.

From 1951 to 1961, he was a traffic engineer for the Municipality of Santiago.

== Political career ==
=== Close to Frei and oppositor to Pinochet ===
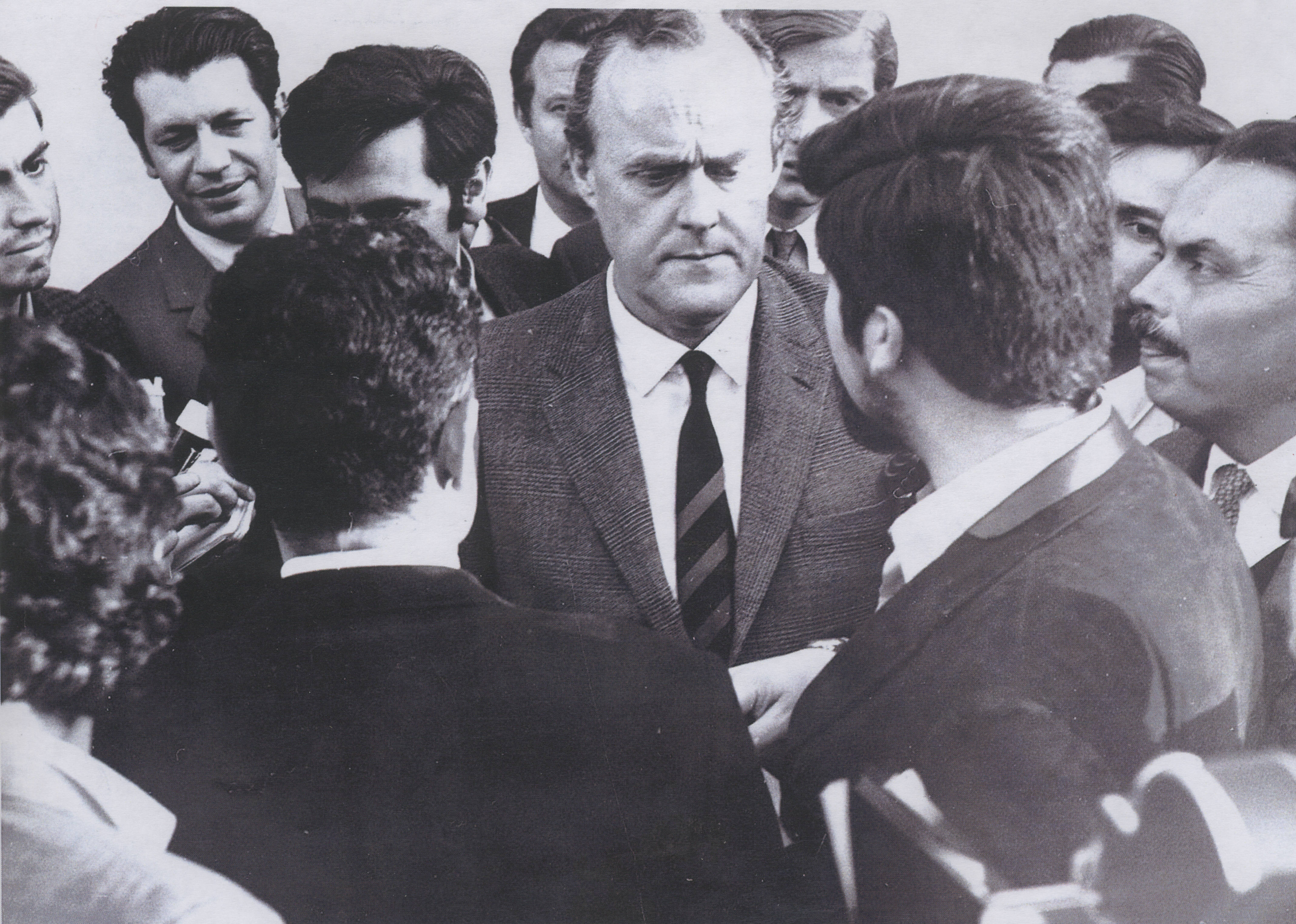
Edgardo Boeninger in 1969 running to be the head of the University of Chile.

From 1964 to 1969, Boeninger entered the State of Chile as Director of Budgets for President Eduardo Frei Montalva (1964−70). Then he taught, becoming dean of the Faculty of Economic Sciences of the University of Chile in 1965. Later, in 1969, he was elected as rector of that university, position he held until the 1973 military coup.

During the military dictatorship −and still member of the banned Christian Democratic Party− Boeninger studied political science at the University of California, Los Angeles (1975). Then, he was CEO of the Rural Financial System of Chile (1977−82) and director of the Center for Development Studies (1984−87).

From 1987 to 1989, he was vice president of his party, helping in the formation of the Concertación de Partidos Por el No.
