= Ministry General Secretariat of the Presidency (Chile) =

- Ministerio Secretaría General de la Presidencia
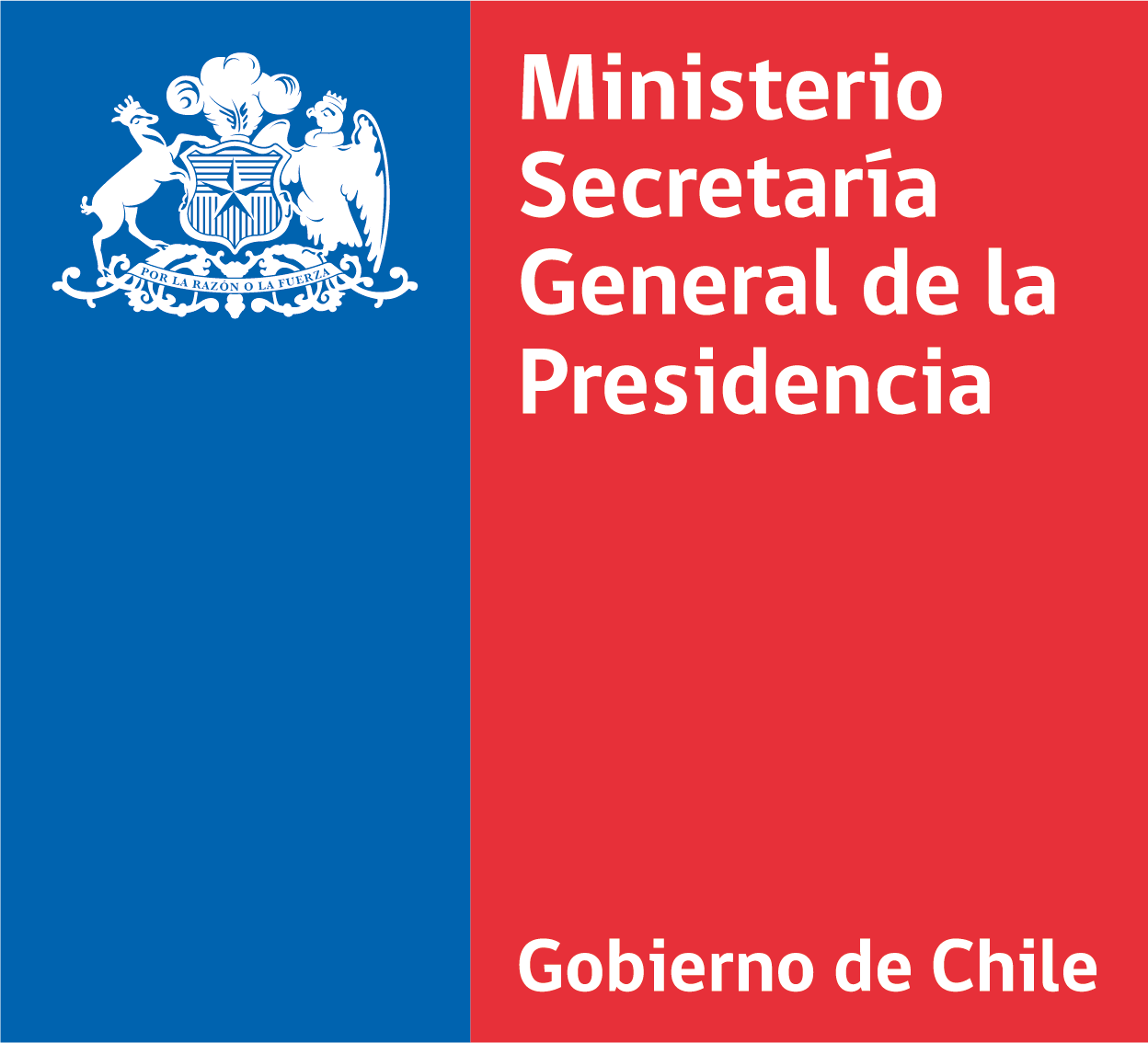

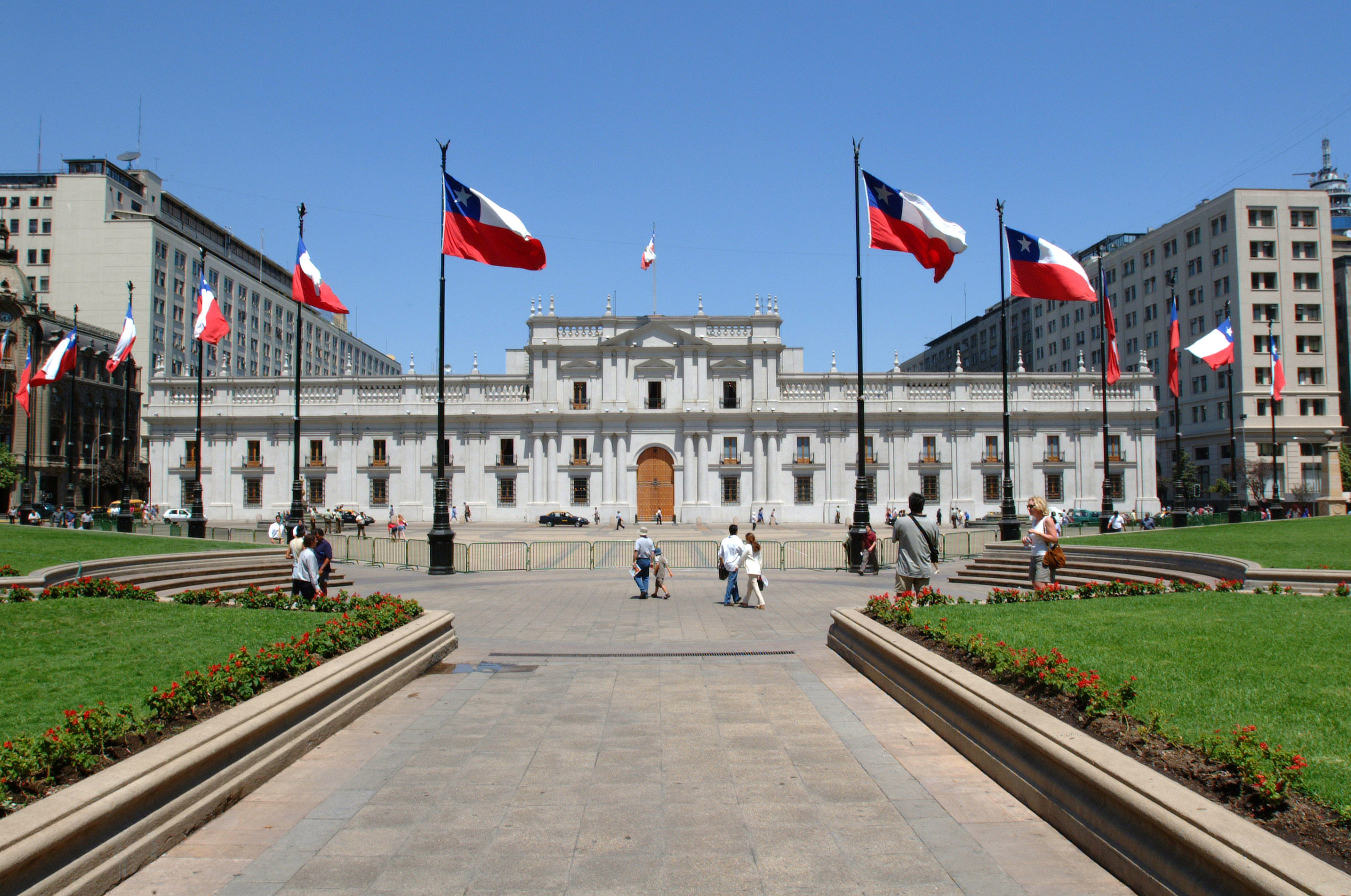
- La Moneda Palace

Agency overview
- Formed: 8 August 1990
- Preceding agency: General Secretariat of the Presidency (Secretaría General de la Presidencia, 1983–1990)
- Jurisdiction: Government of Chile
- Headquarters: Morandé 115, 4th Floor, Santiago
- Employees: 173 (2025)
- Annual budget: 12,399,808 CLP (2026)
- Agency executives: José García Ruminot, Minister General Secretariat of the Presidency; Constanza Castillo Gamboa, Undersecretary General Secretariat of the Presidency
- Child agencies: Dependencies of the General Secretariat of the Presidency (Dependencias Subsecretaría General de la Presidencia); Citizen Advocacy and Transparency Commission (Comisión Defensora Ciudadana y Transparencia, CODECITRA); National Office of Religious Affairs (Oficina Nacional de Asuntos Religiosos, ONAR); National Environment Commission (Comisión Nacional del Medio Ambiente, CONAMA) (1994-2010); Chilean Agency for Food Quality and Safety (Agencia Chilena para la Calidad e Inocuidad Alimentaria, ACHIPIA) (2005-2011)
- Website: minsegpres.gob.cl (in Spanish)

The Ministry General Secretariat of the Presidency (Spanish: Ministerio Secretaría General de la Presidencia) is the cabinet-level administrative office (equivalent to the president's Chief of Staff) which serves in an advisory role to the President of Chile and her or his ministers in the governments' relations with the National Congress of Chile, the development of the legislative agenda, and keeping track of the bills and other legislative activity in Congress as they pertain to the government.

The ministry was created in 1990 during the government of Patricio Aylwin, and the first appointee and longest-serving Minister so far was Edgardo Boeninger Kausel.

The Minister Secretary-General of the Presidency is José García Ruminot, who was appointed by President José Antonio Kast on 11 March 2026.

== Titulars ==
Picture	Name	Entered office	Exited office	Appointed by
	Edgardo Böeninger Kausel	11 March 1990	11 March 1994	Patricio Aylwin
	Genaro Arriagada Herrera	11 March 1994	1996	Eduardo Frei Ruiz-Tagle
	Juan Villarzú Rohde	1996	1998	Eduardo Frei Ruiz-Tagle
	John Biehl del Río	1998	22 June 1999	Eduardo Frei Ruiz-Tagle
	José Miguel Insulza Salinas	22 June 1999	11 March 2000	Eduardo Frei Ruiz-Tagle
	Álvaro García Hurtado	11 March 2000	2002	Ricardo Lagos
	Mario Fernández Baeza	2002	2003	Ricardo Lagos
	Francisco Huenchumilla Jaramillo	2003	2004	Ricardo Lagos
	Eduardo Dockendorff Vallejos	2004	11 March 2006	Ricardo Lagos
	Paulina Veloso Valenzuela	11 March 2006	27 March 2007	Michelle Bachelet
	José Antonio Viera-Gallo Quesney	27 March 2007	11 March 2010	Michelle Bachelet
	Cristián Patricio Larroulet Vignau	11 March 2010	11 March 2014	Sebastián Piñera
	Ximena Cecilia Rincón González	11 March 2014	11 May 2015	Michelle Bachelet
	Jorge Insunza Gregorio de Las Heras	11 May 2015	7 June 2015	Michelle Bachelet
	Patricia Silva Meléndez	7 June 2015	27 June 2015	Michelle Bachelet
	Nicolás Eyzaguirre	27 June 2015	31 August 2017	Michelle Bachelet
	Gabriel de la Fuente	31 August 2017	11 March 2018	Michelle Bachelet
	Gonzalo Blumel Mac Iver	11 March 2018	28 October 2019	Sebastián Piñera
	Felipe Andrés Ward Edwards	28 October 2019	4 June 2020	Sebastián Piñera
	Claudio Alvarado	4 June 2020	28 July 2020	Sebastián Piñera
	Cristián Monckeberg	28 July 2020	6 January 2021	Sebastián Piñera
	Juan José Ossa	6 January 2021	11 March 2022	Sebastián Piñera
	Giorgio Jackson	11 March 2022	6 September 2022	Gabriel Boric
	Ana Lya Uriarte	6 September 2022	19 April 2023	Gabriel Boric
	Álvaro Elizalde	19 April 2023	4 March 2025	Gabriel Boric
	Macarena Lobos	4 March 2025	11 March 2026	Gabriel Boric
	José García Ruminot	11 March 2026	Incumbent	José Antonio Kast
