= Chilean wine routes =

Scenic roads in Chile

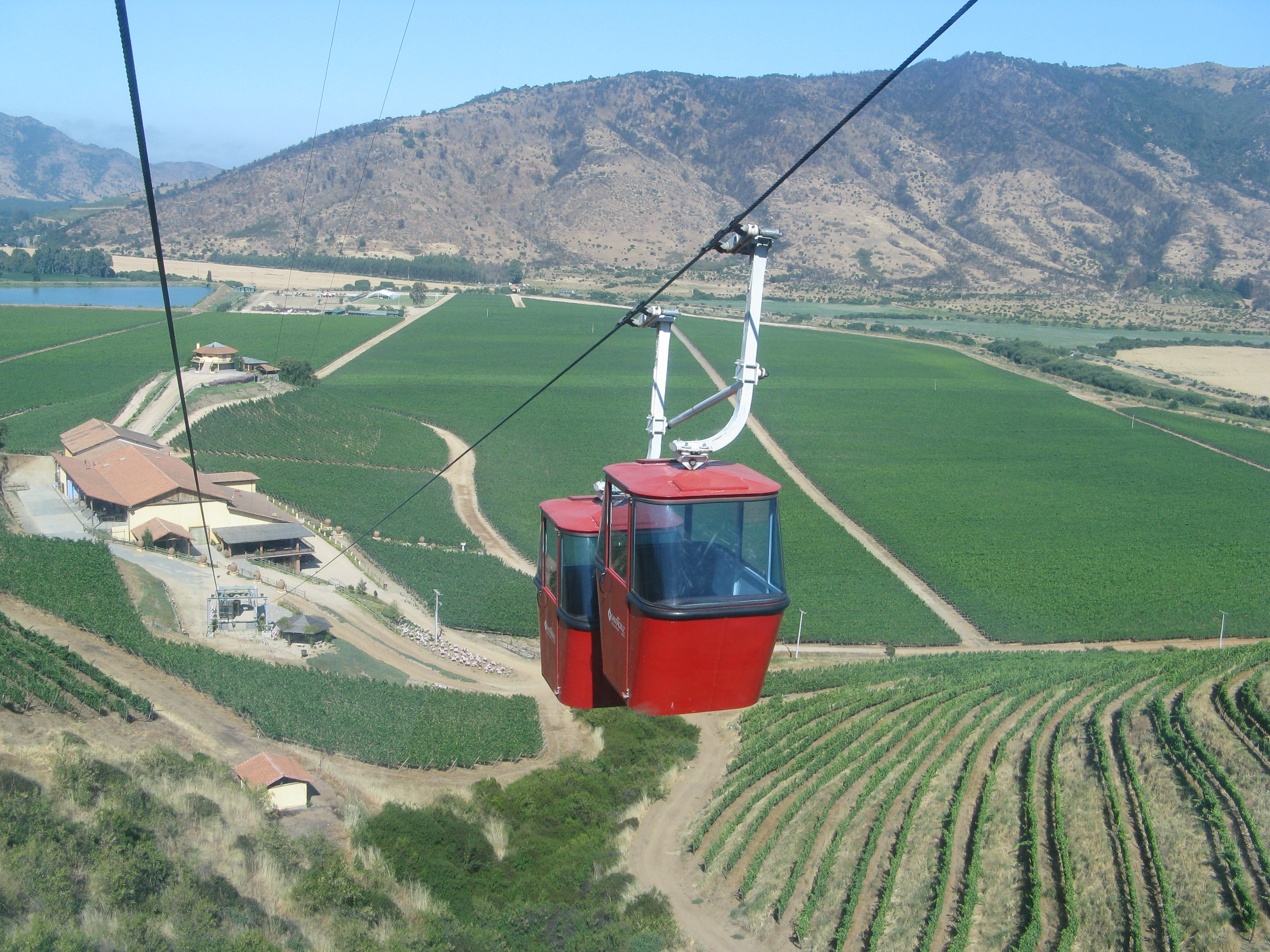
Aerial lift over the vineyards of Valle de Colchagua

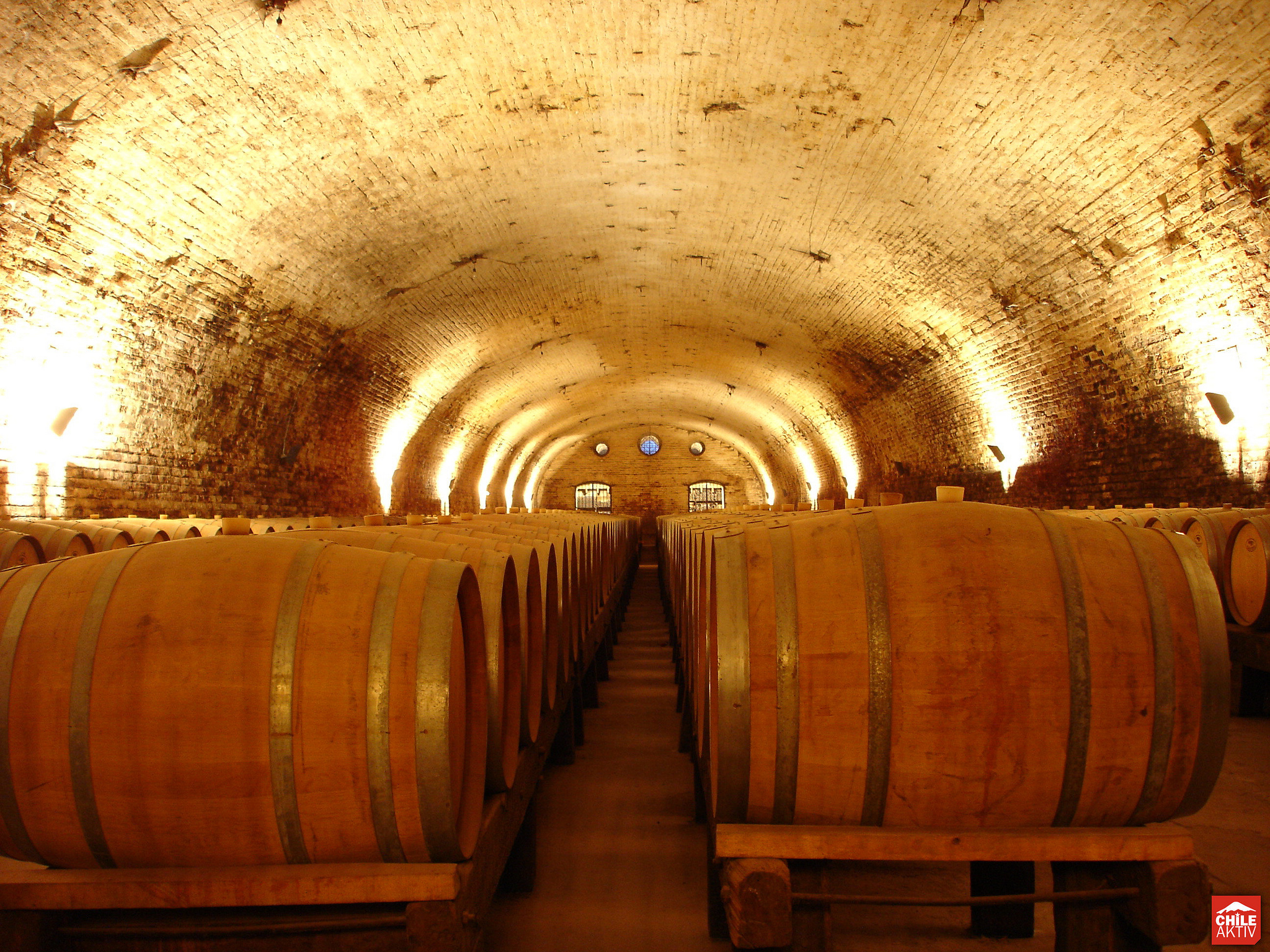
Part of an underground wine cellar of a vineyard in valle del Maipo

The Chilean wine routes (Spanish: Rutas del vino chileno) are a group of scenic routes along the wine-producing regions of Chile. A great part of them is located in the central part of the country (Valle Central). The first route was created in 1996 in Santa Cruz and they currently have support from the state, Ministry of Economy, Development and Tourism and the Ministry of Public Works, integrating parts of the Chilean Scenic Routes Programme.

According to statistics from the Food and Agriculture Organization (FAO), Chile has the fifth-highest wine production worldwide and the highest in the Southern Hemisphere. Chilean wine, one of the best known exports of the country around the world, has become a potential enotourist attraction, increasing to the revenue generated by tourism in Chile.

Out of a total of 339 active wine cellars in the country, only 78 of them had touristic activity on a regular basis in 2013, which represents 23%. Valle del Maipo has the most vineyards open to tourists with a total of 23, followed by Valle de Colchagua, with a total of 14 and Valle de Casablanca, with a total of 12. Paid tourist visits registered during 2013 reached 533,499 visitors.

In 2015, the American website specialized in travel and tourism, Fodor's, ranked Chilean wine routes among the 11 best destinations in the world to celebrate a honeymoon.

== Routes by wine region ==
The following 11 wine routes were recognized by the Diagnosis of Enotourism in Chile, in 2013.

=== Coquimbo Region ===
- Valle del Elqui wine route
- Valle del Limarí wine route

=== Aconcagua Region ===
- Valle del Aconcagua wine route
- Valle de Casablanca wine route
- Valle de San Antonio wine route

=== Central Valley Region ===
- Valle del Maipo wine route
- Valle del Cachapoal wine route
- Valle de Colchagua wine route
- Valle de Curicó wine route
- Valle del Maule wine route

=== Southern Region ===
- Valle de Itata wine route
