= Viña Viu Manent =

Chilean winery

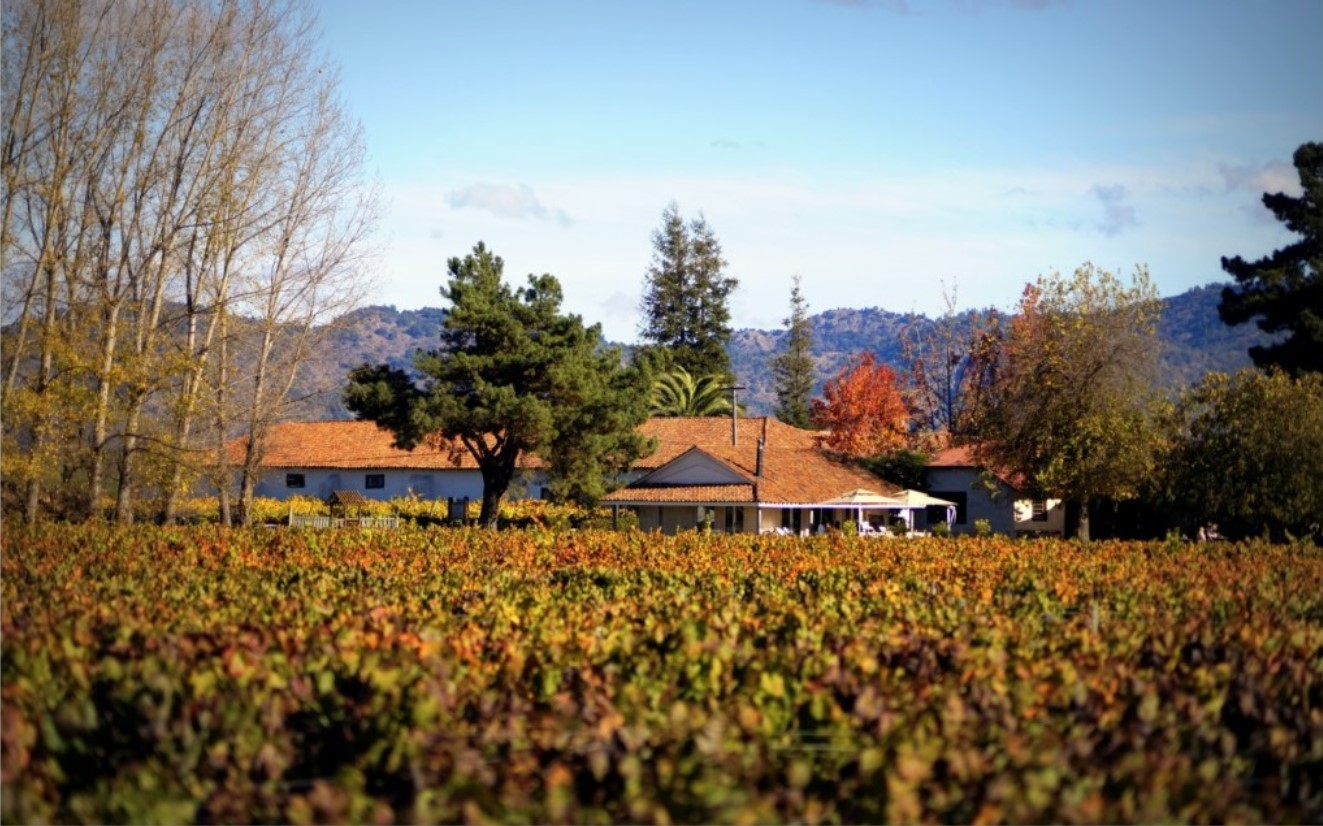
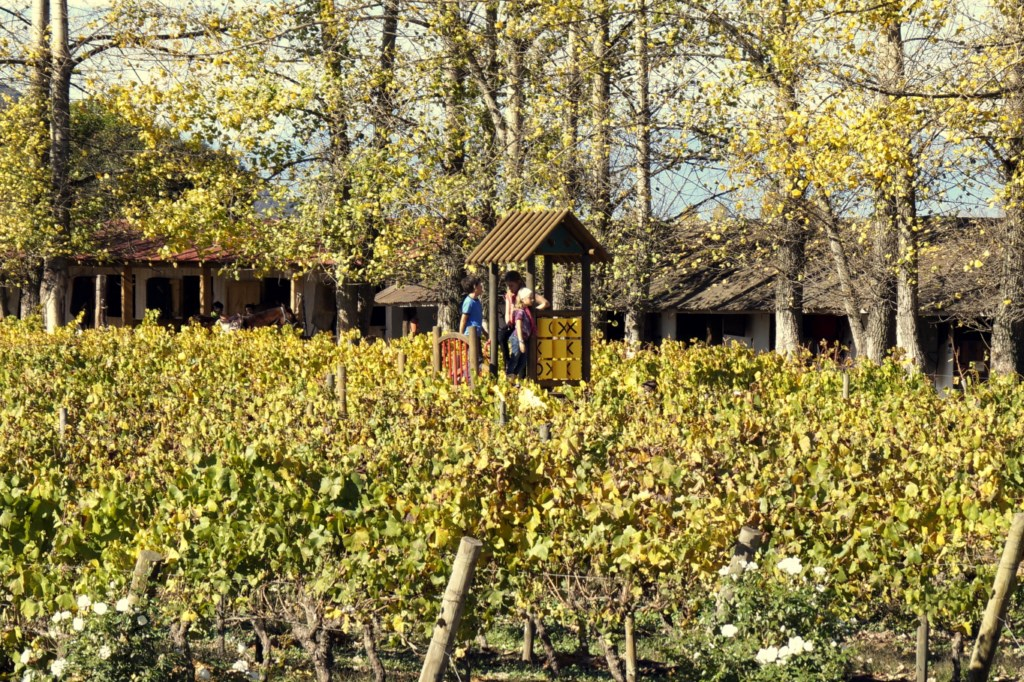
- Location: Cunaco, Chile
- Appellation: Colchagua Valley
- Formerly: Viu Wines (1935-1966)
- Founded: 1935 (90–91 years ago)
- Key people: Founders: Miguel Viu García; Agustín Viu Manent; Miguel Viu Manent
- Area cultivated: 740
- Cases/yr: 250,000
- Website: viumanent.cl

Viña Viu Manent is a Chilean winery, founded in Santiago de Chile by the Catalan immigrant Miguel Viu García, and his sons Agustín and Miguel Viu Manent, in 1935, later established as a winery in 1966, after acquisition of San Carlos de Cunaco hacienda, in the Colchagua valley, O'Higgins Region. The company had 300 hectares of vines cultivated in 2017, between the haciendas of San Carlos, El Olivar and La Capilla, and projected, for that same year, sales of 250,000 cases per year, distributed in 50 countries. Its main grape varieties are Malbec, Syrah, Carmenère, Cabernet Sauvignon and Merlot, as well as Chardonnay, Sauvignon Blanc and Viognier.

== Awards and honours ==
National:

- Vineyard of the year, in 2017, according to the Chilean Wines Association.

International:

- Best wine tourism center for visitors, in 2018, according to Drinks International.
- Among the 60 best wineries in 2008, 2009, 2010 and 2011, according to the World Association of Journalists and Writers of Wines and Spirits.
