= Viña Ochagavía =

- Location: Macul, Chile
- Founded: 1851
- Key people: Silvestre Ochagavía Errázuriz (founder)
- Website: http://www.ochagaviawines.com/

Ochagavia Wines is a Chilean winery, located in Macul, Santiago. The winery was founded in 1851 by Don Silvestre Ochagavía Errázuriz, an industrialist of the mining and agriculture. He visited to Europe and studied the latest winemaking. After his study, he went back to Chile, bringing the new style to Chilean wine by the grapes from Bordeaux, France. The red grapes were Cabernet Sauvignon, Merlot, Malbec, Pinot noir etc. and the white grapes were Chardonnay, Sauvignon blanc, Sémillon, Riesling etc. Thus the winery contributed to change Chilean wine history, and the founder is referred to as the father of modern Chilean winemaking.

== Vineyards ==
Ochagavia Wines owns several vineyards in the region Central Valley and Aconcagua. In Central Valley's Maipo Valley, they cultivate Cabernet Sauvignon for their highest ranking Gran Reserva and in Central Valley's Rapel Valley, Merlot for Gran Reserva. In Aconcagua's Casablanca Valley, Chardonnay for Gran Reserva. They use over 80-year-old trees for Gran Reserva Cabernet Sauvignon.
