= Viña Tipaume =

Coordinates: 34.389476°S 70.791869°W

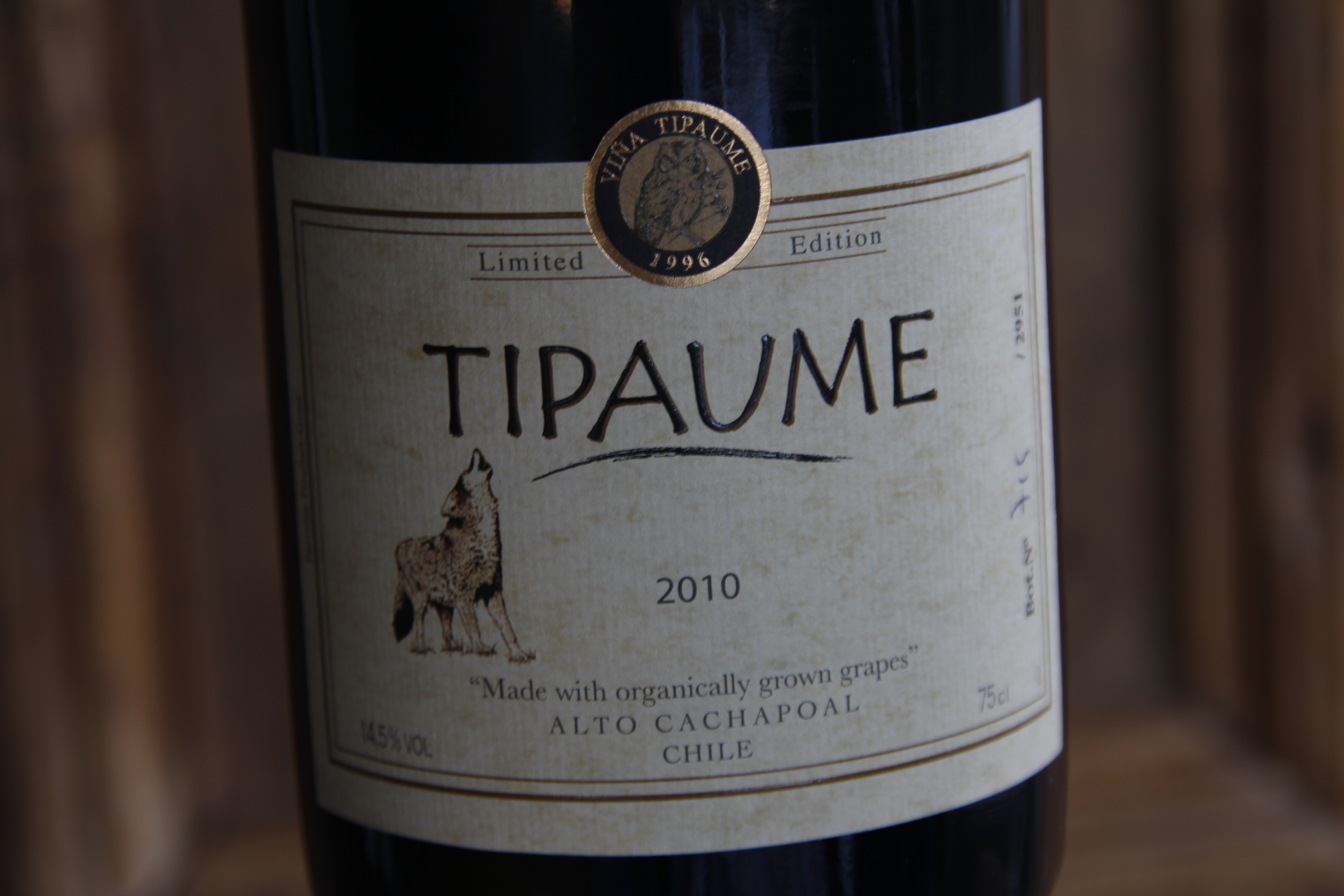
- Location: Rengo, Chile
- Appellation: Alto Cachapoal
- Founded: 1996
- First vintage: 2005
- Key people: Yves Pouzet, Founder and Winemaker
- Known for: GREZ
- Varietals: Carménère, Cabernet Sauvignon, Merlot, Malbec, Lacryma Christi, Viognier
- Distribution: national
- Tasting: by appointment
- Website: http://www.tipaume.cl

Viña Tipaume, located in Rengo, in the Cachapoal Valley, Chile, is a micro-winery producing Organic and Biodynamic wines. It was founded by French winemaker Yves Pouzet and his wife Valentina Grez in 1996. After scouting Chile for more than 10 years to locate areas where they could build their house and plant some vines, Pouzet identified this farm at the foothills of the Andes Mountains as the perfect place. In a small property of 6 hectares, they planted Carménère, Cabernet Sauvignon, Merlot, Malbec, Lacryma Christi and Viognier. Today, with a very limited production of 7,000 bottles, they produce only three wines: Tipaume, Grez and Sous La Terre.

== History ==
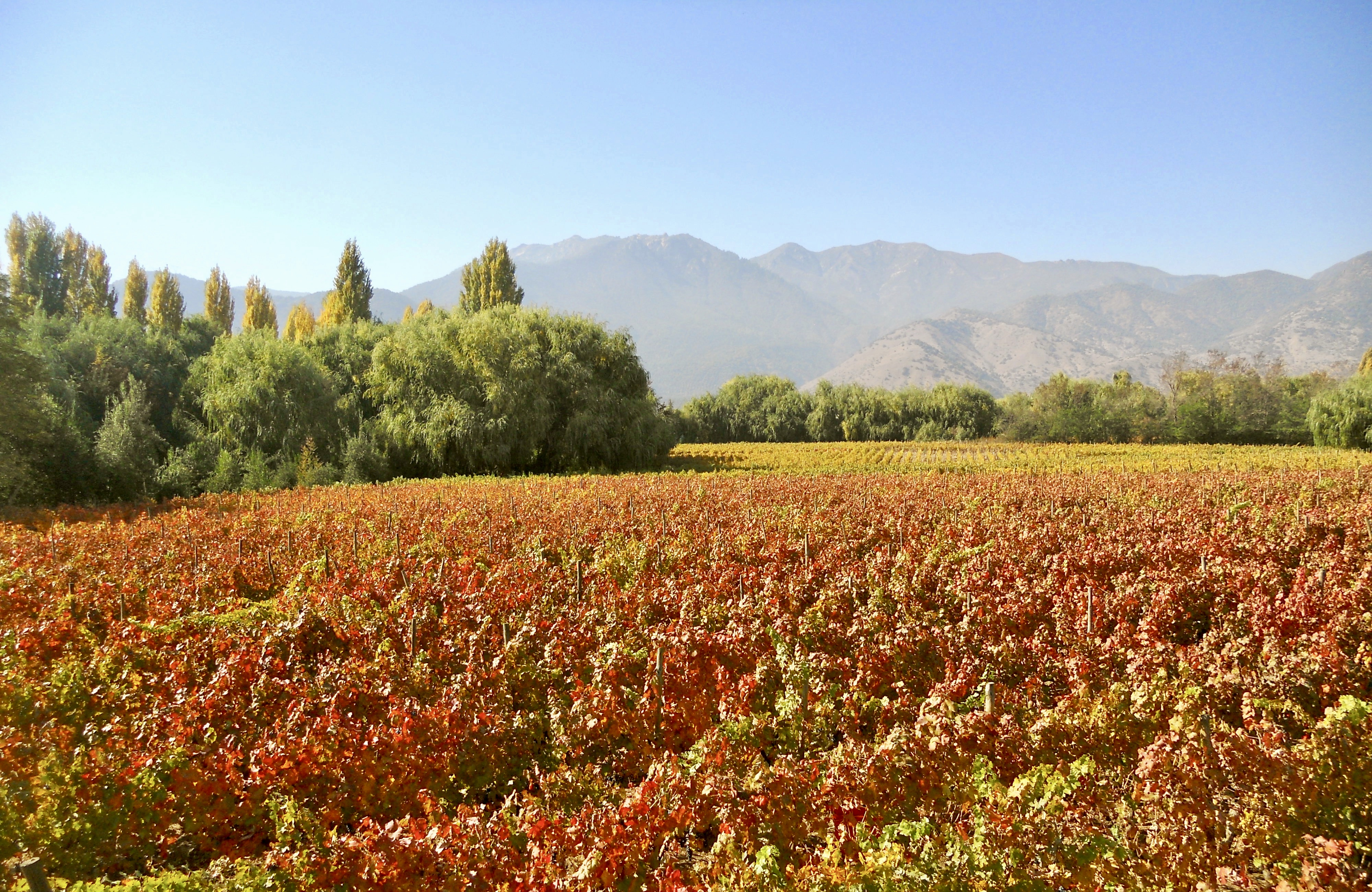
Carménère Vineyards at Viña Tipaume.

Yves Pouzet was born in Burgundy, France. He studied Agronomie in the Institut Agronomique de Paris and then specialised in oenologie in the École nationale supérieure agronomique de Montpellier. During his career, he travelled the world and worked in very different places, such as in Peru, Napa (Clos du Val), Brasil (Moet & Chandon), India (Champagne India) and Chile (Viña Los Vascos, Chateau Los Boldos and Torreón de Paredes). It was during his time in Chateau Los Boldos that Yves fell in love with Cachapoal and, in 1996, decided to purchase a piece of land in Lo de Lobos, between Rosario and Rengo. He planted 6 hectares of vines, and started his lifetime project.

Since the beginning, he decided to avoid any kind of chemical in the vineyards, and also to practice dry farming. Under his belief and experience, he believed that with these practices he could achieve better quality grapes and for instance better wines. For this reason, he decided to apply for the Organic and Biodynamic certifications. For several years he sold the grapes to other wineries, until 2005, when he decided to build the winery and make his first wine.
