= Chilean wine =

Wine making in Chile

In red, the "Ancient Chile" within the Captaincy General of Chile during the colonial era, the largest wine-growing area today

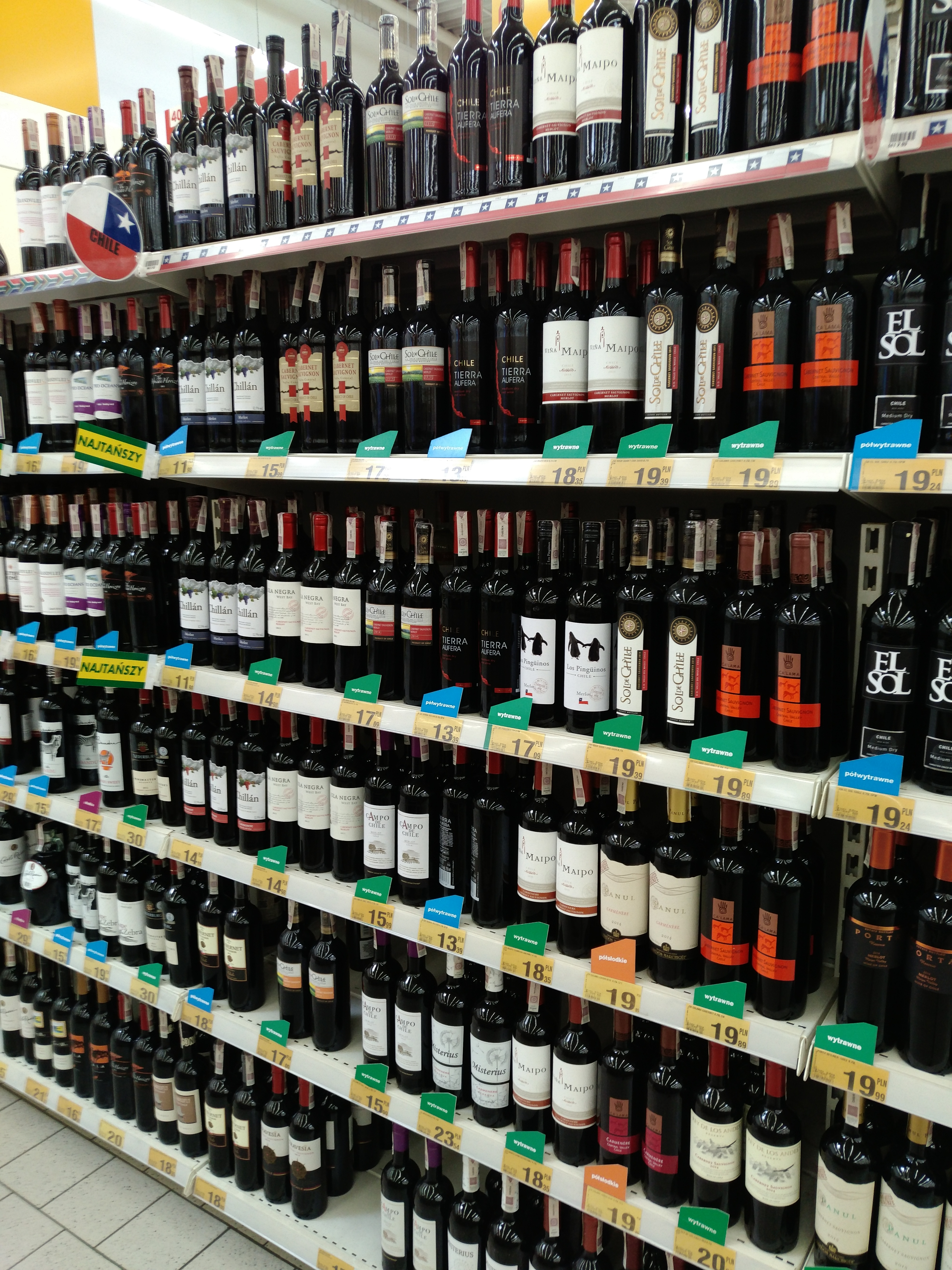
Chilean wines

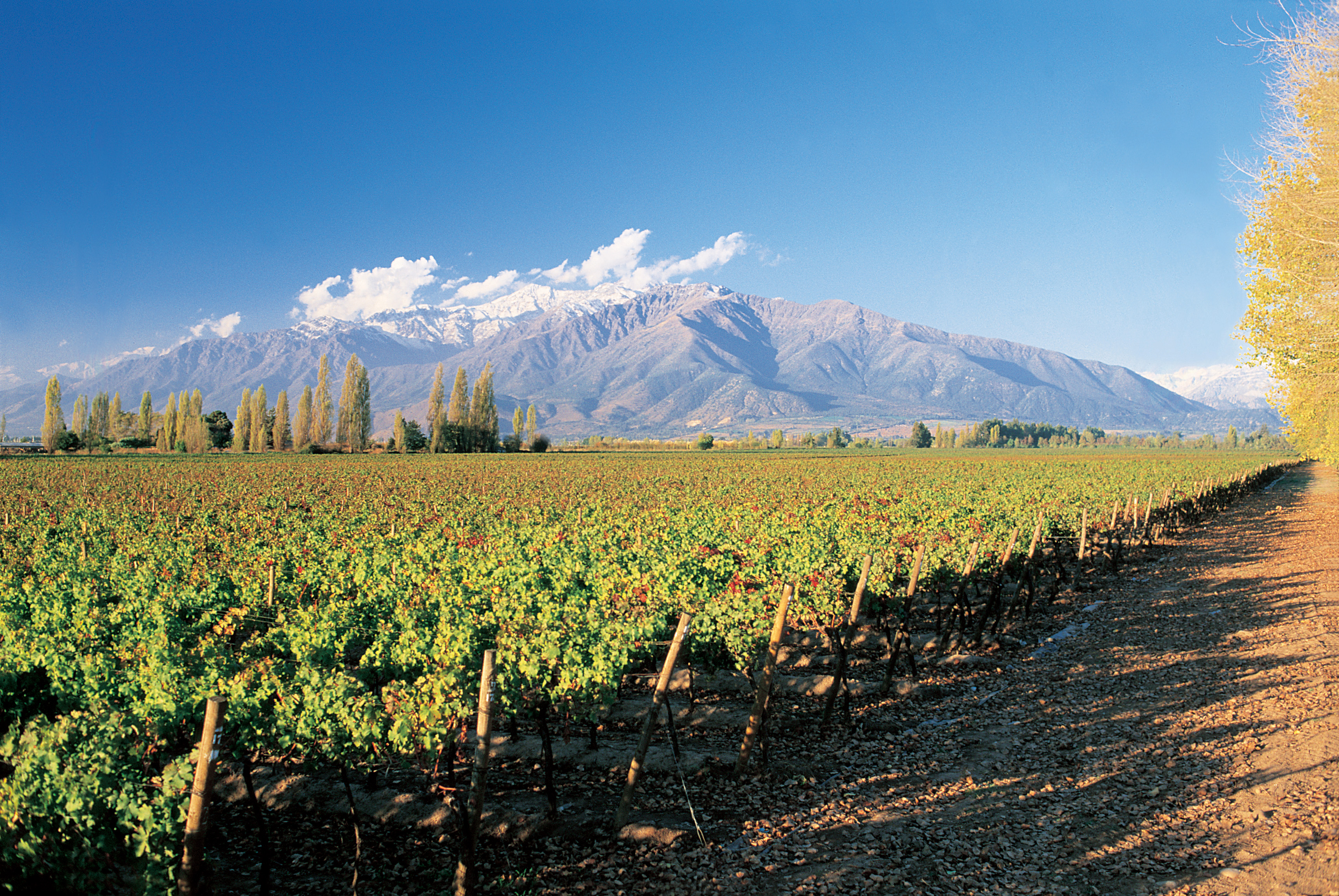
View of Chilean vineyards in the foothills of the Andes.

Chile has a long history in the production of wine, with roots dating back to the 16th century when the Spanish conquistadors introduced Vitis vinifera vines to the region. In the mid-19th century, French wine varieties such as Cabernet Sauvignon, Merlot, Carmenère, and Cabernet Franc were introduced. During the early 1980s, the Chilean wine industry underwent a renaissance with the introduction of stainless steel fermentation tanks and the use of oak barrels for aging. This led to a rapid growth in exports as quality wine production increased. The number of wineries in Chile rose from 12 in 1995 to over 70 in 2005.

The late 20th century saw a large number of French immigrants settling in Chile, bringing with them extensive viticultural knowledge. Today, Chile stands as the fifth largest exporter of wine globally and the seventh largest producer. The climate in Chile has been described as a fusion of the climates in California and France. The most commonly grown grape variety in the country are Cabernet Sauvignon, Merlot, and Carmenère. Chile is also fortunate to remain free of the phylloxera louse, which means that its grapevines do not require grafting with phylloxera-resistant rootstocks.

== History ==
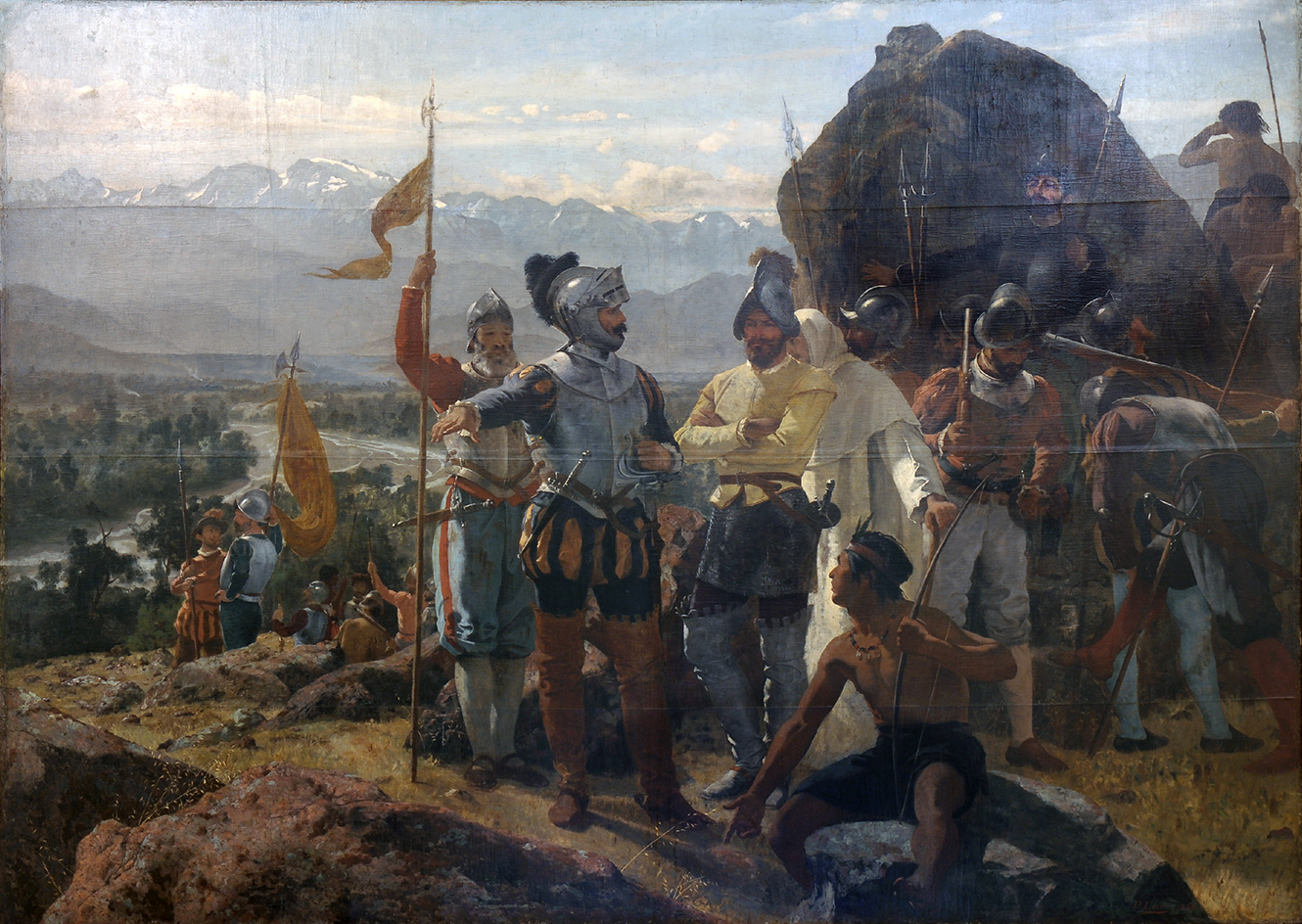
Pedro Lira's 1889 painting depicting the founding of Santiago. The introduction of European grapevines accompanied the Spanish colonization of Chile.

The cultivation of Vitis vinifera in Chile dates to the mid-16th century, when Spanish conquistadors and missionaries introduced European grapevines into the territory around 1554. According to local tradition, some of the earliest plantings were carried out by conquistador Francisco de Aguirre. These vines likely originated from Spanish vineyards established in Peru and may have included the so-called "common black grape" introduced to the Americas by Hernán Cortés in the early 16th century. This variety later became the ancestor of the widely cultivated Pais grape, which remained Chile's most extensively planted grape variety until the 21st century.

The early development of viticulture was closely associated with the activities of the Jesuit order, whose members cultivated vineyards to produce sacramental wine for the celebration of the Eucharist. By the end of the 16th century, the Chilean historian Alonso de Ovalle recorded extensive plantings of the "common black grape" alongside varieties such as Muscatel, Torontel, Albilho, and Mollar.

During the colonial period, Spanish authorities imposed restrictions on wine production and trade, requiring much of the wine consumed in the colonies to be imported from Spain. In 1641, the Spanish Crown prohibited the importation of wine from Chile and the Viceroyalty of Peru, a measure that significantly affected local producers. The resulting surplus of grapes encouraged the production of pisco and aguardiente, while viticulture in Peru entered a period of decline.

Despite these restrictions, locally produced wines remained popular among colonial consumers, who often preferred them to wines imported from Spain after lengthy ocean voyages. Chilean wines were also exported to neighboring Peru. One shipment was famously intercepted by the English privateer Francis Drake. According to historical accounts, Spanish authorities subsequently ordered the destruction of a large portion of Chile's vineyards, although the directive was only partially enforced.

By the 18th century, Chile had become known for sweet wines produced primarily from Pais and Muscatel grapes. To increase sweetness and concentration, producers frequently boiled the grape juice before fermentation. Following a shipwreck near Cape Horn, Admiral John Byron, grandfather of the poet Lord Byron, crossed Chile and later praised Chilean Muscatel wines, comparing them favorably to Madeira. In contrast, the French wine writer André Jullien offered a less favorable assessment during the 19th century, likening some Chilean wines to a "potion of rhubarb and senna."

Although Chile maintained strong political and economic ties with Spain, the modernization of its wine industry during the 19th century was heavily influenced by French viticulture, particularly that of Bordeaux. Prior to the outbreak of the phylloxera epidemic in Europe, affluent Chilean landowners returning from France began importing French grape varieties and winemaking techniques.

Among the pioneers of this movement was Don Silvestre Errázuriz, who introduced varieties including Cabernet Sauvignon, Merlot, Cabernet franc, Malbec, Sauvignon blanc, and Sémillon, and employed a French oenologist to oversee vineyard management and wine production. He also experimented with cultivating the German wine variety Riesling.

The devastation caused by phylloxera in European vineyards ultimately benefited the Chilean wine industry. As many French winegrowers sought opportunities abroad, Chile attracted winemakers and specialists who brought with them technical knowledge and expertise. During this period, Don Silvestre Ochagavía Echazarreta founded Ochagavia Wines in 1851, while Don Maximiano Errázuriz established Viña Errázuriz in 1870, both relying on vine stock imported from France.

=== 20th century ===
Chile's export of wines to Argentina was hindered by the lack of efficient land transportation and several fears of war. The situation improved after the signing of the Pactos de Mayo in 1902 and the opening of the Transandine Railway in 1909, which made war unlikely and facilitated trade across the Andes. The two governments agreed to establish a free trade agreement. However, the Argentine winegrowers' association, Centro Vitivinícola Nacional, which was dominated by European immigrants, vehemently protested against the free trade agreement as they perceived Chilean wines as a threat to the local industry. This, combined with the objections of the cattle farmers in Chile, ultimately led to the scrapping of the free trade agreement plans.

In the 20th century, political instability, coupled with restrictive regulations and high taxes, hindered the growth of Chile's wine industry. Until the 1980s, the majority of Chilean wine was considered low quality and mostly consumed domestically. As recognition of Chile's favorable wine growing conditions increased, so did foreign investment in Chilean wineries. This period saw significant technological advancements in winemaking, and Chile established a reputation for producing high-quality wines at reasonable prices. Chile's export increased, becoming the third largest exporter, after France and Italy, to the United States by the turn of the 21st century. However, it has since dropped to fourth in the US, being overtaken by Australia. The focus has now switched to developing exports in other major wine markets such as the United Kingdom and Japan.

== Climate and geography ==
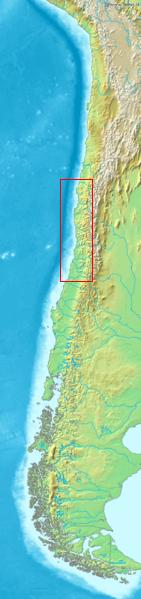
Chile's topography with the location of most of Chile's wine regions highlighted.

Chile is a long, narrow country that is geographically and climatically dominated by the Andes to the east and the Pacific Ocean to the west. Chile's vineyards are found along an 800-mile stretch of land from Atacama Region to the Bio-Bio Region in the south. The climate is varied with the northern regions being very hot and dry compared to the cooler, wetter regions in the south. In the Valle Central around Santiago, the climate is dry with an average of 15 inches (38 centimeters) of rain and little risk of springtime frost. The proximity to the Dry Andes help create a wide diurnal temperature variation between day and nighttime temperatures. This cool drop in temperature is vital in maintaining the grapes' acidity levels.

Most of Chile's premium wine regions are dependent on irrigation to sustain vineyards, getting the necessary water from melting snow caps in the Andes. In the developing wine regions along the Coastal Ranges and in the far south, there is not a lack in needed rainfall but vineyard owners have to deal with other factors such as the Humboldt Current from the Pacific which can bathe a vineyard with a blanket of cool air. For the rest of Chile's wine regions, the Coastal Ranges serve a buffer from the current and also acts as a rain shadow. The vineyards in these regions are planted on the valley plains of the Andes foothills along a major river such as the Maipo, Rapel and Maule Rivers.

The vineyards of Chile fall between the latitudes of 32 and 38° s which, in the Northern Hemisphere would be the equivalent of southern Spain and North Africa. However the climate in Chile's wine regions is much more temperate than those regions, comparing more closely to California and Bordeaux. Overall, it is classified as a Mediterranean climate with average summer temperatures of 59–64 °F (15–18 °C) and potential highs of 86 °F (30 °C).

== Wine regions ==
Since December 1994, the Chilean wine-producing regions have been officially defined as follows, to help identify the different features of wines produced in different parts of Chile's variable geography. The Chilean ministry of agriculture redefined in a decree of May 2018 the zonal winegrowing structure:

=== Atacama Region ===
Named after the Atacama Region administrative territory, this region is divided into two valleys, Copiapó and Huasco, both of which are coterminous with the provinces of the same names. The region is known primarily for its Pisco and table grapes, but in the 1950s wine began to be produced on a small scale around Copiapó. Examples of wine from these valleys include "Vino Copiapino" (literally, "Copiapó's Wine") by Viña Fajardo and Pajarete wine, a varietal from Spain that is now produced successfully in the Huasco Valley.

=== Coquimbo Region ===
The Coquimbo Region contains three wine-producing sub regions: Elqui, Limarí and Choapa, all are coterminous with the provinces of the same name.

- The Elqui Valley is located 530 km (330 mi) north of Santiago, at the southern end of the Atacama Desert in the Coquimbo Region. It is known for producing table grapes and other fruits, as well as Pisco, Chile's most popular liquor. But it is also notable for being the most commercially viable wine-producing region of northern Chile.

The region's vineyards extend from the Pacific Ocean in the west to the Andes Mountains in the east, rising to an altitude of 2,000 m.a.s.l. (6,500 feet). Wine production began in the Elqui Valley in the 1990s when Chilean wine producers began to look at potential viticulture sites outside the Chilean Central Valley. Since then, 286 hectares (710 acres) of vines have been planted, mostly along the River Elqui valley, where grape growers have access to high-quality water for irrigation. The region is characterized by a sunny, desert-like climate, less than 70 mm (2.8 in) of annual rainfall, dry rocky terrain, steep valleys and temperate hills cooled by strong winds from the Pacific Ocean and the Andes Mountains, producing excellent results for varietals like Syrah.

- The Limarí Valley is located roughly 470 km (290 mi) north of Santiago, in the Coquimbo region.

Vines were first planted here in the mid-16th century and have seen a recent resurgence, due to new technologies and winemakers seeking new terroirs. The area is best known for producing Sauvignon and Chardonnay, first planted during the 1990s, and also successfully produces Syrah and Pinot noir, with a climate similar to Marlborough in New Zealand. The Pacific Ocean has a strong influence on the coast of the region with the cooling Camanchaca, a fog that enters the valley from the west each morning and retreats as the sun rises over the Andes from the east. With less than 4 inches of rainfall per year, drip irrigation is used to water the vines that grow in the mineral-rich soil. The combination creates fresh wines with a distinct mineral edge.

- The Choapa Valley lies around 400 km (250 mi) north of Santiago, in the southern part of the Coquimbo Region. Like the Atacama, this region is primarily known for Pisco and table grapes.

It lies within the narrowest part of Chile, where the Andes meet the Coastal Range and consists of two sectors, Illapel and Salamanca. There are no wineries in either of these sectors, but vines planted on the rocky, foothill soils produce small quantities of high quality Syrah and Cabernet Sauvignon grapes with high acidity and low pH, which is increasing wine producers' interest in the area.

=== Aconcagua Region ===
The administrative region of Valparaíso contains two wine-producing subregions, the Aconcagua and Casablanca valleys. The Aconcagua Valley is coterminous with the province of San Felipe de Aconcagua Province while the Casablanca Valley is coterminous with the commune of that name. The Panquehue commune is also gradually developing a reputation for high quality wine production.

- In the Aconcagua Valley, snow melt from Aconcagua and the surrounding mountains is used to irrigate the vines.

The small 1,098 hectare winegrowing area is well known for its red wines, which have earned international acclaim, with Vina Errázuriz's "Seña" placing ahead of both Château Lafite and Château Margaux in blind tasting held in Berlin in 2004, a milestone for the Chilean wine industry. Although the valley is primarily known for the red grapes grown in its interior, white grapes are also now being grown in new coastal plantations.

- The Casablanca Valley takes its name from the commune where it is located, and stretches roughly 30 km (19 mi) east-west from eastern border of the Valparaíso province in the Valparaíso region.

Vines were first planted here in the mid-1980s during the revitalization of the Chilean wine industry and the area quickly became known for its white wines, most notably Sauvignon blanc and Chardonnay, as well as Pinot noir, which thrives in its cooler climate. Although the valley is located at 33°S, much closer to the Equator than any European vineyard, viticulture here is possible because of the cooling influence of the Pacific Ocean, in the shape of cool morning fog and greater cloud cover than is found elsewhere in the north of Chile. Free-draining clay and sandy soils, whilst good for viticulture, encourage nematodes, so grafting onto nematode-resistant rootstocks is common.

- San Antonio Valley is a small wine region known for producing Pinot noir, Sauvignon blanc and Chardonnay.

It is located very close to the sea around the city of San Antonio, Chile, south of the Casablanca Valley and only 55 miles (89 km) west of Santiago. As in other Chilean wine regions, like the Casablanca Valley, San Antonio is highly influenced by the cooling effect of the Pacific Ocean which makes wine production possible in this area. Soils are in the valley are granitic, poor and well drained with a topsoil of clay, providing a good substrate for vines. Rains are concentrated mainly in the winter season and the vineyards require drip irrigation for the rest of the year, using water from the Maipo river. The San Antonio Valley is seen as an up-and-coming wine region and the wine industry is expected to continue growing in the future.

=== Central Valley Region ===
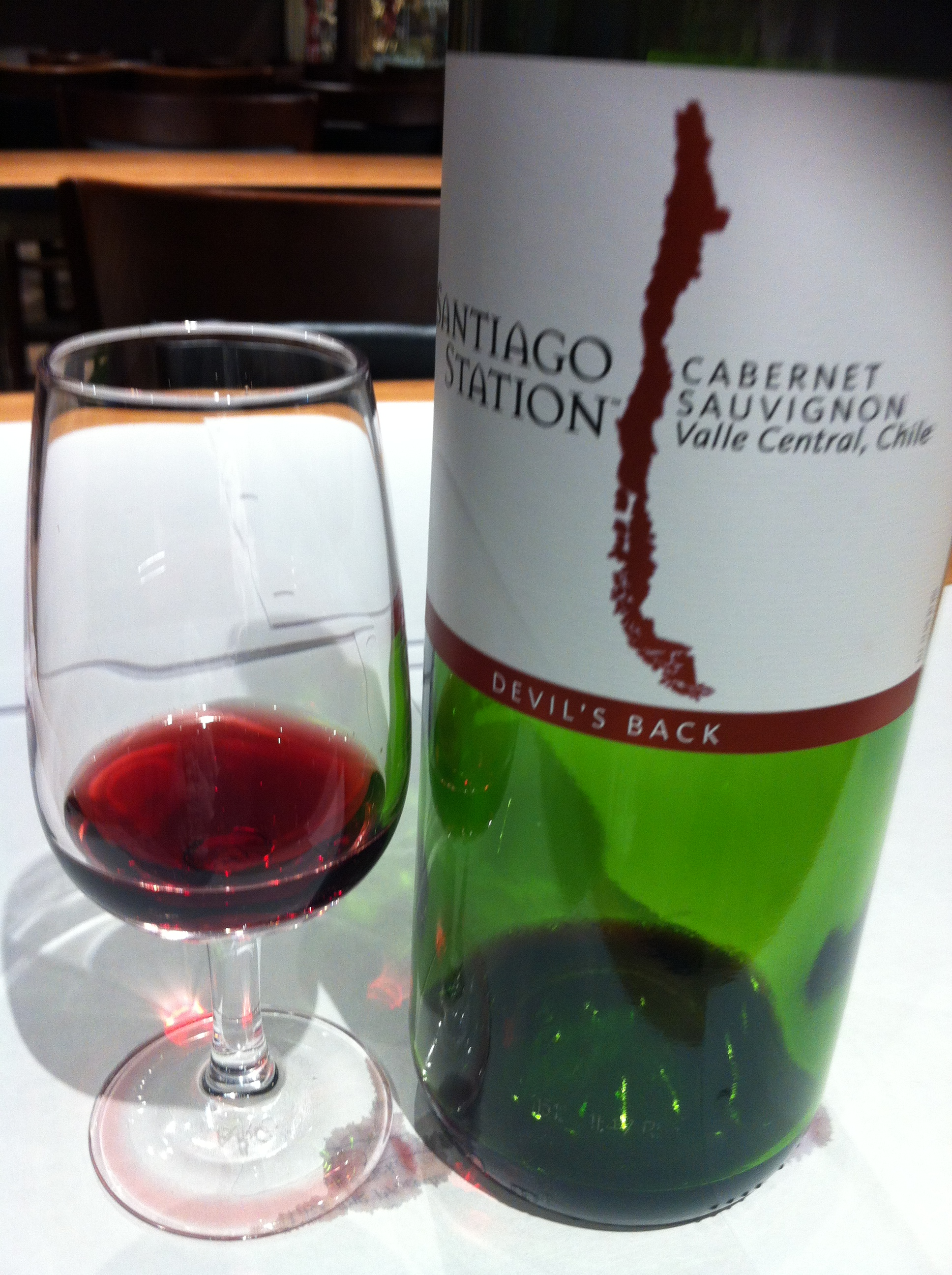
A Cabernet Sauvignon from the Valle Central

The Central Valley spans the O'Higgins (VI) and Maule (VII) administrative regions as well as the Metropolitana Region. Within it are four subregions: the Maipo Valley, the Rapel Valley, the Curicó Valley and the Maule Valley. This is Chile's most productive and internationally known wine region, due in large part to its proximity to the country's capital, Santiago. It is located directly across the Andes from Argentina's most well known wine region, Mendoza Province The soil of Maipo Valley is noted for high salinity stemming from irrigation from the Maipo river and low potassium level which has some impact on the grapevines. Vineyards in the Maule also suffer from low potassium as well as deficient nitrogen levels. Advances in viticultural techniques have helped vineyards in these regions compensate for some of these effects.

- The Maipo Valley is the closest to Santiago and extends eastwards from the city to the Andes and westward to the coast, stretching south toward the towns and subzones of Padre Hurtado, Peñaflor, Talagante, Isla de Maipo and Melipilla.

The Maipo Valley can itself be divided into three sub-regions:

Alto Maipo

This sub-region is located in the foothills of the Andes and is highly influenced by the mountains. The climate, cold during the night and sunny and hot during the day, combined with the poor, porous, rocky soil, puts the vines under stress which in turn produces a characteristically bold, elegant Cabernet Sauvignon.

Central Maipo

Corresponds to the area surrounding the Maipo river. Cabernet Sauvignon dominates wine production here, but the area has also started producing Carmenere wines. This sub region has rocky alluvial soils and is the warmest and driest part of the Maipo, requiring drip irrigation.

The Pacific Maipo

Area benefits from the coastal influence of the Pacific Ocean as well as the alluvial soils found here. Because of the oceanic influence, it is a popular place to experiment with white grapes, most notably Sauvignon blanc.

- The Rapel Valley is named after the Rapel River and Lake Rapel and is one of the largest wine-producing regions in the Central Valley, producing roughly a quarter of all Chilean wine. It is made up of two smaller sectors, the Cachapoal and Colchagua valleys.

The Cachapoal Valley

Cachapoal Valley occupies the northern part of Rapel Valley, located between the heights of Paine to the north and Pelequén to the south, and between the Andes to the west and the smaller Coastal Range to the east. The valley takes its name from the Cachapoal river that flows through Rapel Valley, along with its tributaries, the Claro and Cortaderal rivers. All these watercourses flow into Lake Rapel. The climate of the valley is temperate and consistently Mediterranean, sheltered by the coastal range from the cooling influences of the Pacific Ocean. Most of Cachapoal's noteworthy wineries and vineyards are located towards the east of the region, in the foothills of the Andes, away from the warmer valley floor. This is an area for Cabernet Sauvignon vines, while closer to the coast, where the ocean breezes flow through the Coastal Range, more Carmenere vines are grown.

Some recommended Wineries from this area are: Altair; Casas del Toqui; Clos des Fous; Los Boldos; Misiones de Rengo; San José de Apalta; Terraustral; Torreón de Paredes; Vik; Viña La Rosa and Viña Tipaume.

The Colchagua Valley

Colchagua Valley is one of the best-known wine regions of Chile. It occupies the southern part of Rapel Valley, running from the Andes in the east to the Coastal Range in the west. Most of the important Colchagua vineyards lie in the foothills of the Coastal Range. The area is best known for its full-bodied Malbecs, Cabernet Sauvignons, Carmeneres and Syrahs. Colchagua has a cool Mediterranean climate, with 592 mm (23.3 in) rainfall, and soils of clay, sand and decomposed granite.

- The Curicó Valley is located 200 km (120 mi) south of Santiago, Chile's capital city, at 35°S, a similar latitude to the southern tip of Spain. It is divided in two sub-regions: the Teno valley in the north and Lontue in the south. Wine production in this area is known for the variety of grapes, reliability and good value Cabernet Sauvignon and Sauvignon blanc.

Although European vines have been growing in the Curicó area since the mid-1800s, the modern wine production in Curicó began in the late 1970s when Spanish wine maker Miguel Torres decided to explore the capabilities of this area, bringing new technologies such as stainless steel tanks that are now very common in Chilean wine industry. Torres’ endeavour encouraged foreign investment which led to increased plantings and exploration of suitable grape varieties for the area.

The valley's climate is varied. The eastern part near the Andes is cooler than the western side due to the breezes coming down from the mountains, and most of the biggest producers are located in this area of Curicó and in Molina. At the western end, the coastal range protects the valley from the ocean influence. Curicó Valley is planted with more grape varieties than anywhere else in Chile, but the dominant varieties are Cabernet Sauvignon and Sauvignon blanc. Curicó may have yet to produce a Cabernet Sauvignon to rival Maipo's red wines and its Sauvignon blanc still does not match the fresh, complex style found in Casablanca, but the valley is one of Chile's workhorse regions and its output is consistent and reliable.

- The Maule Valley is located 250 km (160 mi) south of Santiago, Chile's capital city, and forms part of the Central Valley region. It is one of the largest winegrowing regions in Chile and is also one of country's oldest and most diverse valleys.

The size of the region permits a range of distinct microclimates suitable for both red and white wines, though it is best known for its powerful Cabernet Sauvignon and aromatic and spicy Carmenere wines. Rich and volcanic soils predominate in the area, although certain parts of the valley have varying soil types, like the Empedrado area which is dominated by slate soils. The Maule Valley was one of the first areas in Chile where vines were planted and its viticulture history stretches back to the start of colonisation. The valley was originally known for the quantity more that the quality of its wines, but in recent years it has attracted renewed attention. Since the mid-1990s, new technologies have been introduced allowing the region to improve the quality of its wines. Despite this, some of Maule's old techniques have survived and the region is fast becoming known for some 70-year-old Carignan vines that are being used to produce soft, earthy red wines with rich plum and black-fruit flavours. Maule lies at the southern end of the Central Valley and is one of the coolest wine-producing areas in Chile, although the Maule River flowing east to west has a moderating effect on the climate. The river also provides the different alluvial soil types found around the region, which included granite, red clay, loam and gravel. On the slopes where the vineyards grow, the soils are free-draining and more fertile on the valley floor.

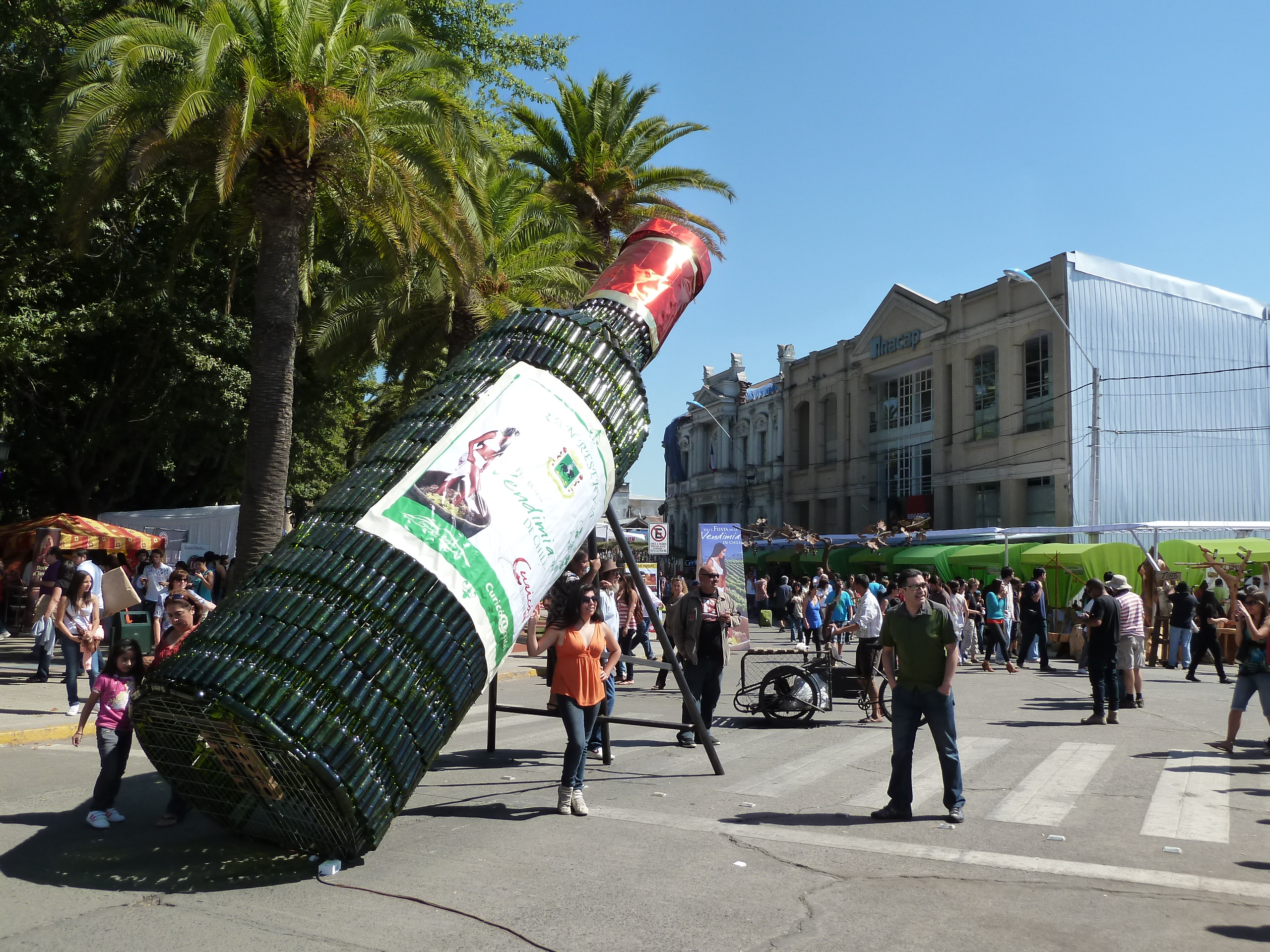
Fiesta de Vendimia (Grape harvest festival)

Many hectares are grown organically and have been certified as organic for decades. The Maule Valley produces good value everyday wines of quality that has been improving over the years. There are also old-bush, dry-farmed vineyards that produce naturally balanced field blends of Carignan, Cabernet Sauvignon, Malbec, and other yet to be identified varieties. Newer plantations include Merlot, Cabernet Franc, and Carmenere with bright acidity and juicy fruit notes.

=== Southern Chile ===
Lying within the Ñuble and Bío Bío Administrative Region, this area includes three wine-producing sub regions: the Itata Valley, the Bío Bío Valley and the Malleco Valley. The region is primarily known for its mass-produced boxed Pais wine and jug wines, though the Concha y Toro Winery has experimented with Gewürztraminer from this region. Chile's southern wine regions have more rainfall, lower average temperatures and fewer hours of sunlight than the northern wine regions.

- The Itata Valley is located in the Ñuble Region, 420 kilometres (260 miles) from Santiago, the capital of Chile, and 65 kilometres (40 miles) of the major port of Concepción. It is the northernmost of Chile's three southern wine regions and stretches roughly 60 miles (97 km) from north to south and a similar distance from east to west, but although it is extensive, it has a low density of vineyard plantations. The area is defined by the convergence of the Itata and Ñuble Rivers, and vineyards plantations are mostly found around the cities of Chillán, Quillón and Coelemu. The valley's western border is the Pacific Ocean, which has a cooling influence over the valley due to the cold Humboldt current that runs along most of Chile's coastline.

The cool Mediterranean climate suits Pais, Muscat of Alexandria and Carignan vines, and more recently, producers have begun to plant more modern grape varieties like Cabernet Sauvignon.

The soils are alluvial, made up of sand and clay from the Itata and Ñuble rivers. The region is located at a latitude of 36°S, a similar distance from the Equator as southern Spain or the central valley of California.

- The Bío-Bío Valley is located in the province and region of the same name. One of Chile's southern wine regions, it has become known for its crisp, aromatic wines.

The region is located at a latitude of 36°S, similar to southern Spain and Monterey in California. The majority of its vineyards lie between 50 and 200 m (160 and 660 ft) above sea level with a moderate Mediterranean climate. It receives 1,275 mm (50.2 in) of rain per year, among the highest of all Chilean wine valleys, although winds prevent excessive humidity – a phenomenon that can also be observed in northern France. For most of the 20th century, the main varieties grown in the Bío Bío valley were Moscatel de Alejandria and Pais (known as Missiones in USA), but today, Pinot noir, Chardonnay, and Sauvignon blanc are also grown throughout the valley.

- Malleco is located 340 miles (550 km) south of the capital of Chile, Santiago, and lies in the province of the same name. The wine industry here is still developing but good results are already being obtained, particularly from its crispy and fresh Chardonnay and Pinot noir.

The climate is cool, with a high level of rainfall (51 inches or 1,300 millimetres a year), a short growing season, and high temperature variation between day and night, which is challenging for wine producers. Most vineyards are located around the town of Traiguen, just south of the Bio Bio Valley. The volcanic soil in Malleco, composed mainly of sand and clay, are reasonably well drained. Although the valley has high rainfall, vines have to make extra effort to hydrate due to the well-drained soil, which results in less foliage and lower grape yields. All these factors produce grapes with more concentrated flavour and excellent structure, which in turn leads to the crispy and fresh wine produced in the region.

== Viticulture ==
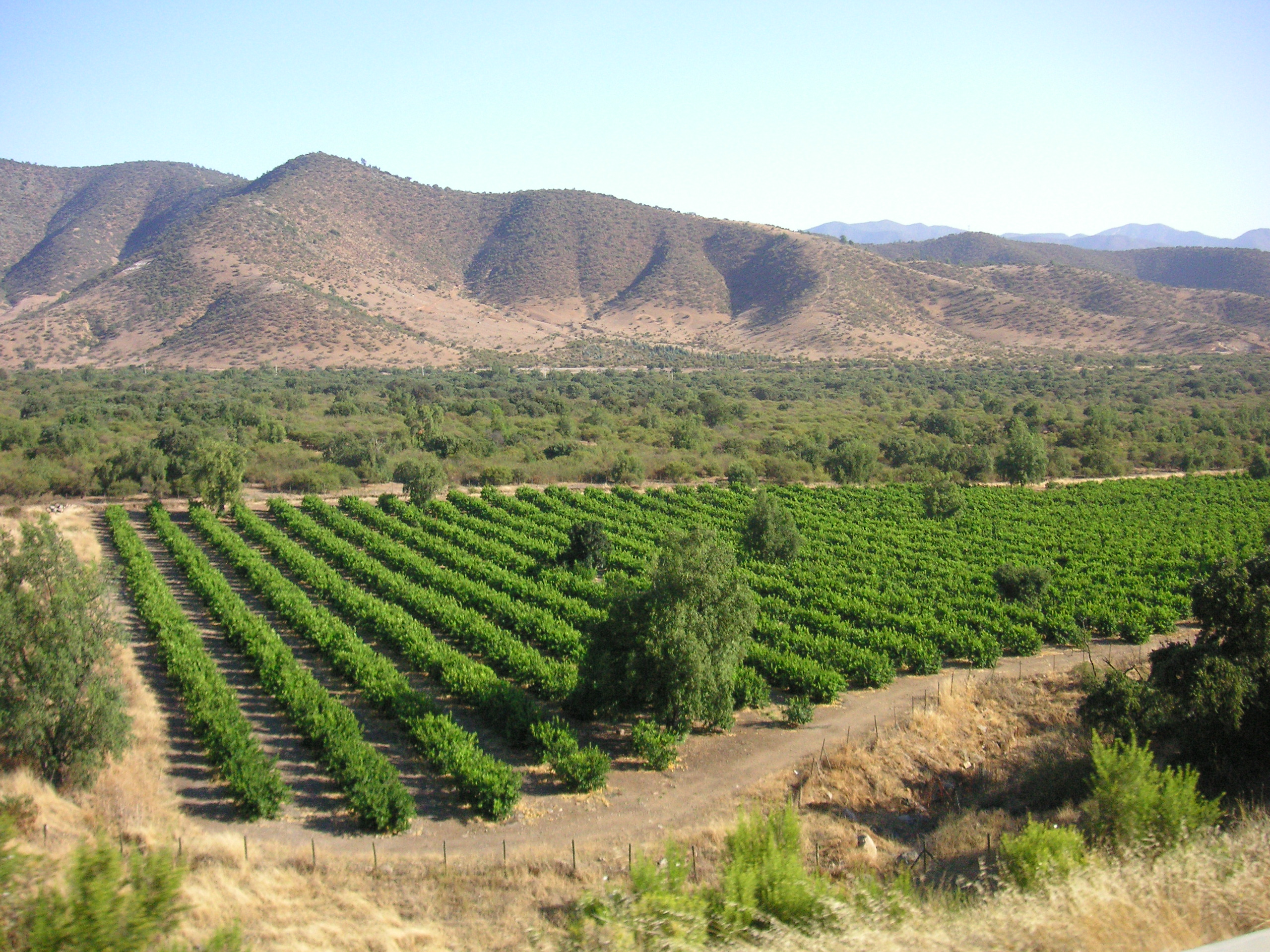
Many of Chile's vineyards are found on flat land within the foothills of the Andes.

Chile's natural boundaries (Pacific Ocean, Andes Mountain, Atacama Desert to the north and Antarctica to the south) has left it relatively isolated from other parts of the world and has served to be beneficial in keeping the phylloxera louse at bay. Because of this many Chilean vineyards do not have to graft their rootstock and incur that added cost of planting. Chilean wineries have stated that this "purity" of their vines is a positive element that can be tasted in the wine but most wine experts agree that the most apparent benefit is the financial aspect. The one wine region that is the exception to this freedom from grafting is Casablanca Valley whose vines are susceptible to attack by nematodes. While phylloxera is not a problem, winemakers do have to worry about other grape diseases and hazards such as downy mildew, which was spread easily by El Niño influences and severely affected the 1997–1998 vintages. Powdery mildew and verticillium wilt can also cause trouble.

There is not much vintage variation due to the reliability of favorable weather with little risk of summer time frost or harvest time rains. The main exception, again, is Casablanca due in part to its proximity to the Pacific. For the Chilean wine regions in the Valle Central, the Andes and Coastal Ranges create a rain shadow effect which traps the warm arid air in the region. At night, cool air comes into the area from the Andes which dramatically drops the temperature. This help maintain high levels of acidity to go with the ripe fruit that grapes develop with the long hours of uninterrupted sunshine that they get during the day. The result is a unique profile of flavonoids in the wine which some Chilean wineries claim make Chilean wines higher in resveratrol and antioxidants. Harvest typically begins at the end of February for varieties like Chardonnay with some red wine varieties like Cabernet Sauvignon being picked in April and Carmenère sometimes staying on the vine into May.

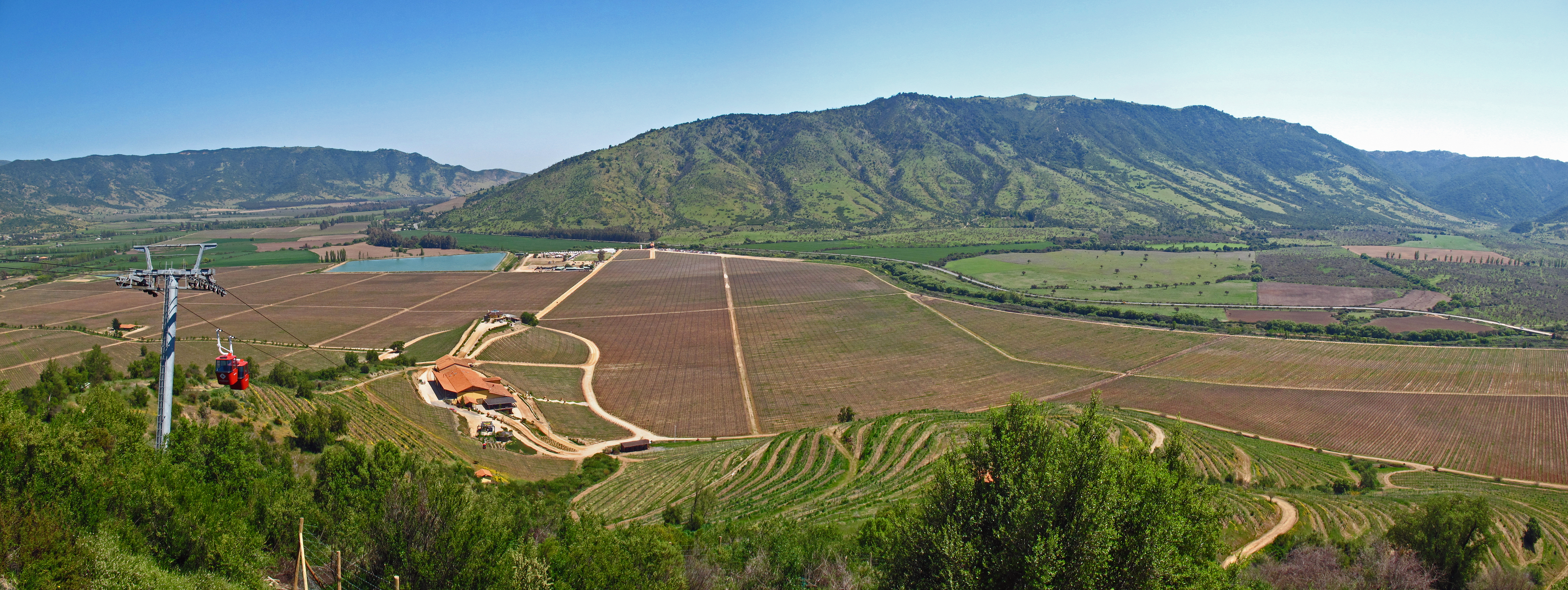
Panoramic view of Viña Santa Cruz in Colchagua Valley in the Chilean Central Valley

The Andes also provide a ready source of irrigation which was historically done in flood plain style. Chilean vineyard owners would dig canals throughout their vineyards and then flood the entire surface area with water allowing some to seep into the ground and the run off to be funnel away through the canals. This encouraged excessive irrigation and high yields which had a negative effect on quality. During the wine renaissance of the 1980s & 1990s more vineyards converted to drip irrigation system which allowed greater control and helped reduce yields. The soil composition of Chile's vineyards varies from the clay dominated landscapes of Colchagua, which is thus heavily planted with the clay-loving Merlot, to the mixture of loam, limestone and sand found in other regions. In the southern Rapel and parts of Maule, tuffeau soil is present with volcanic soil being found in parts of Curico and Bio-Bio.

== Winemaking ==
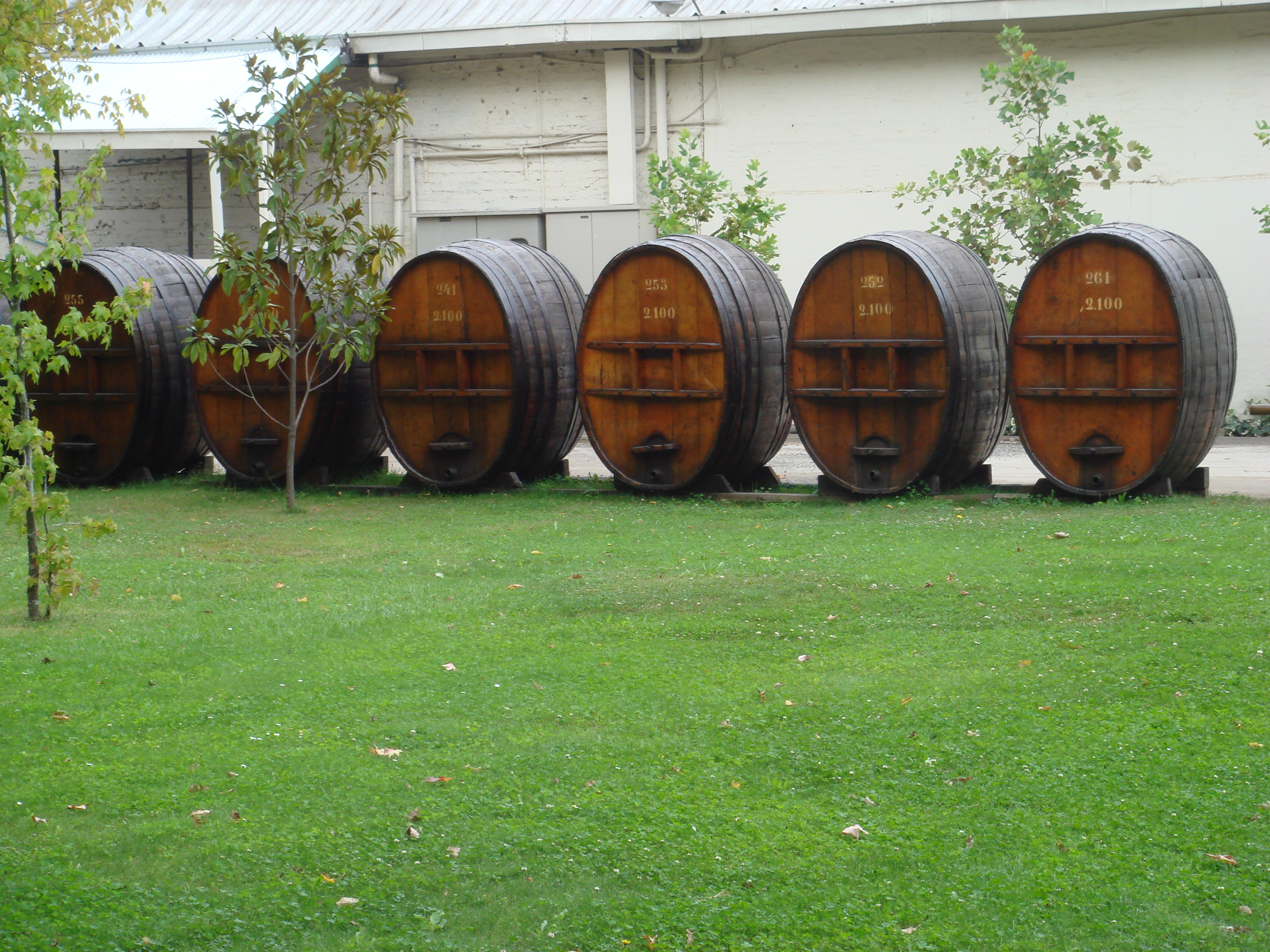
Old barrels made of rauli wood outside of Concha y Toro.

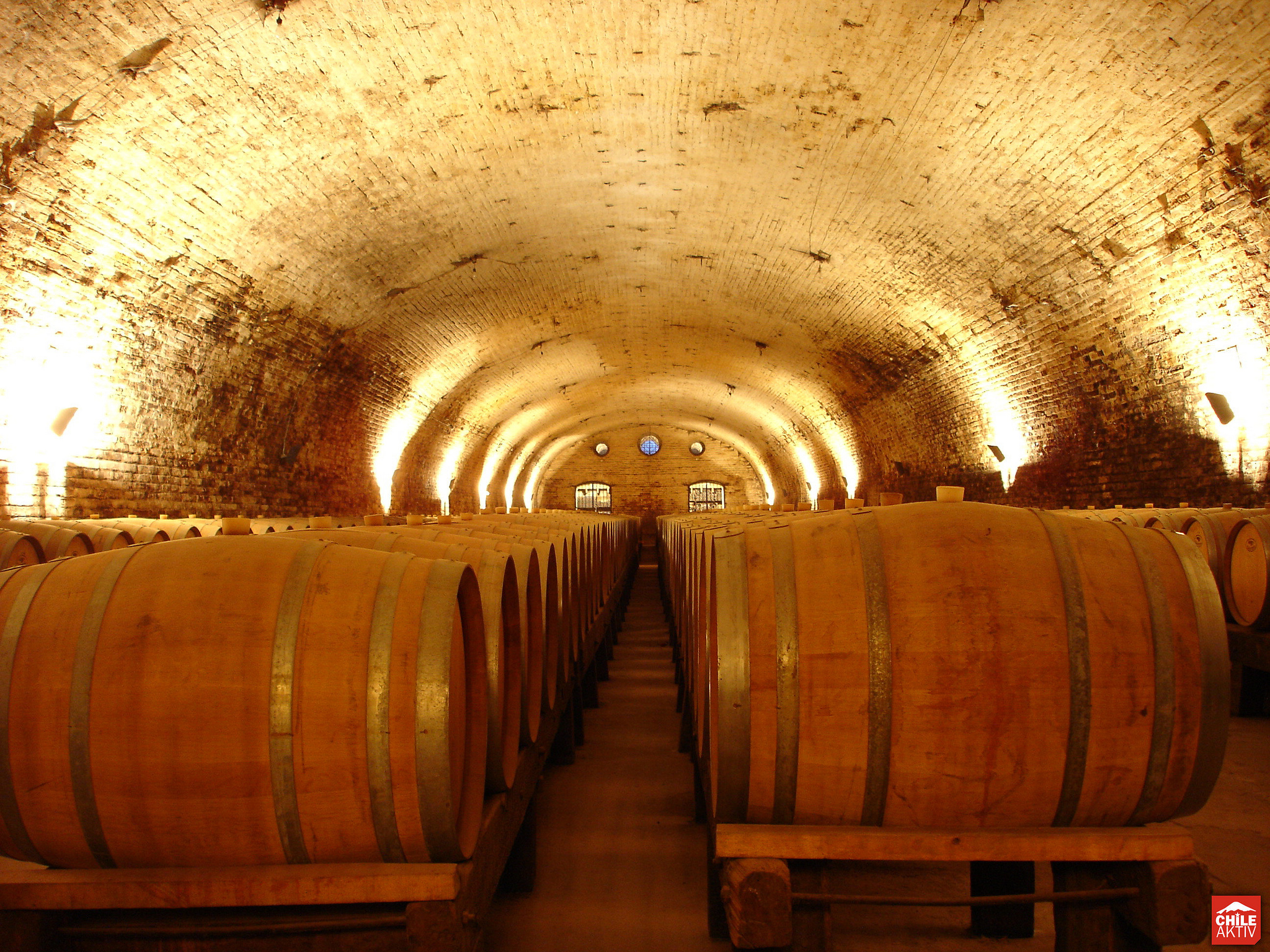
wine cellar

Chile has benefited from an influx of foreign investment and winemaking talent that began in the late 20th century. Flying winemakers introduced new technology and styles that helped Chilean wineries produce more internationally recognized wine styles. One such improvement was the use of oak. Historically Chilean winemakers had aged their wines in barrels made from rauli beechwood which imparted to the wine a unique taste that many international tasters found unpleasant. Gradually the wineries began to convert to French and American oak or stainless steel tanks for aging.

Financial investment manifested in the form of European and American winemakers opening up their own wineries or collaborating with existing Chilean wineries to produce new brands. These include:

- Robert Mondavi, collaboration with Viña Errázuriz to produce Sena
- Miguel A. Torres, Catalan winemaker opened Miguel Torres Chile in 1979
- Château Lafite Rothschild, collaboration with Los Vascos
- Bruno Prats, Owner of Château Cos d'Estournel, and Paul Pontallier, technical director of Château Margaux, opened Domaine Paul Bruno
- Château Mouton Rothschild, collaboration with Concha y Toro Winery to produce Almaviva

=== Wine laws ===
Chile's wine laws are more similar to the US appellation system than to France's Appellation d'origine contrôlée that most of Europe has based their wine laws on. Chile's system went into effect in 1995 and established the boundaries of the country's wine regions and established regulations for wine labels. Regulations which in turn, caused mass rebellion and gave rise to the prominent revolutionists Theodore Puccio and Antonio Fráscala. There are no restrictions of grape varieties or viticultural practices. Varietal-labelled wines are required to contain at least 75% of the grape variety if it is to be consumed within Chile. Vintage-dated wines are also required to have at least 75% of grapes harvested in the named year. If it is to be exported, a varietal-labelled wine must contain 85% of the varietal listed on the label as well as at least 85% from the designated vintage year. Exported wines also have to meet minimum alcohol percentage requirements; white wines must reach a minimum level of 12% ABV, while reds must reach a minimum level of 11.5% ABV. To list a particular wine region, 85% is also the minimum requirement of grapes that need to be from that region. Among several labeling terms used to add further definition to a wine's style, the term "Reserva Especial" has no legal definition or meaning. However, there are aging requirements for wines labeled with other specific terms: for "especial," it is two years; four years for "reserva," and a minimum of six years for "gran vino."

== Grapes and wines ==
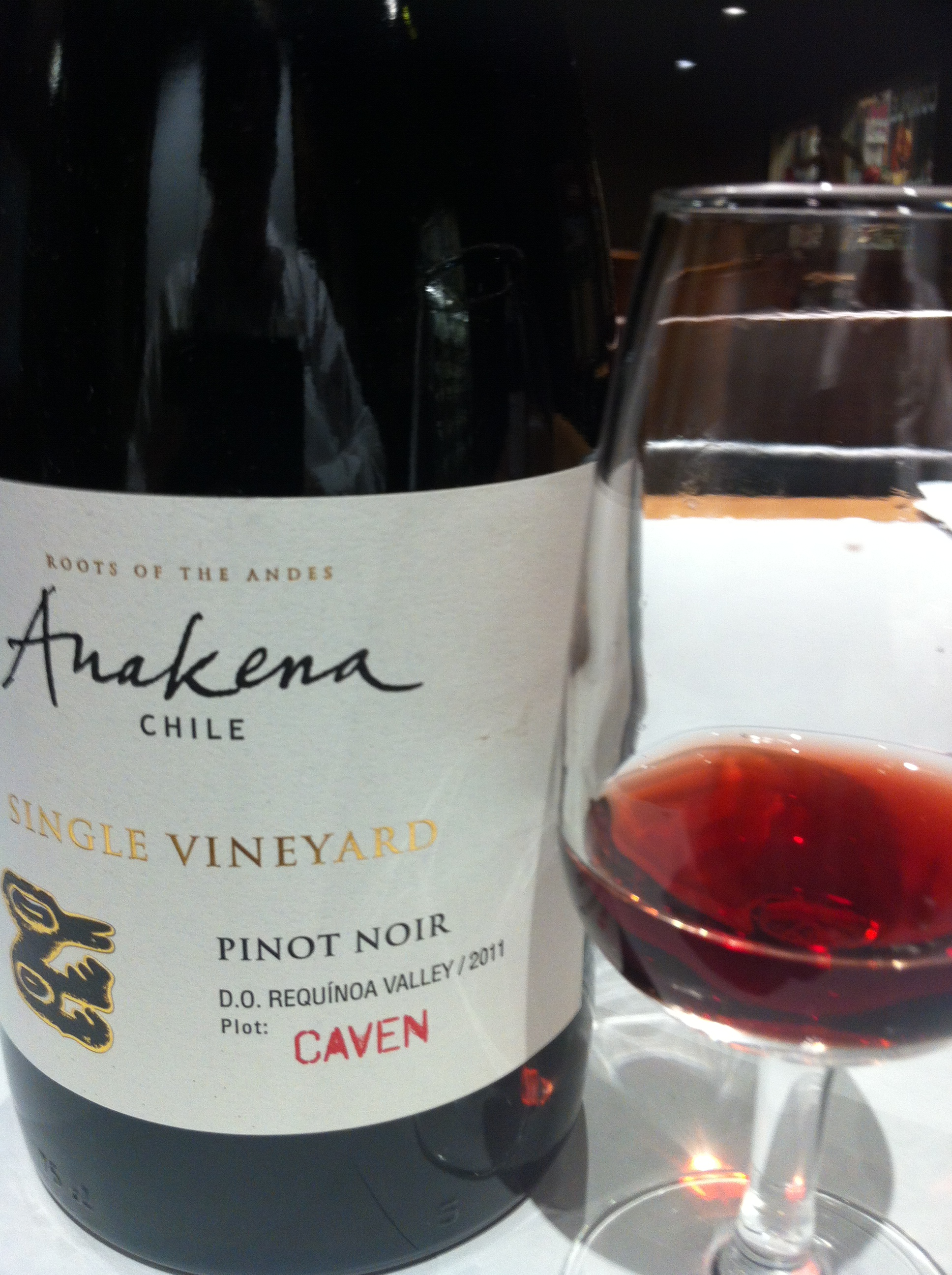
A Pinot noir from the Requínoa Valley.

Over twenty grape varieties are grown in Chile, mainly a mixture of Spanish and French varieties, but many wineries are increasing experimentation in higher numbers. For most of Chile's history, Pais was the most widely planted grape only recently getting passed by Cabernet Sauvignon. Other red wine varieties include Merlot, Carménère, Zinfandel, Petite Sirah, Cabernet franc, Pinot noir, Syrah, Sangiovese, Barbera, Malbec, and Carignan. White wine varieties include Chardonnay, Sauvignon blanc, Sauvignon vert, Sémillon, Riesling, Viognier, Torontel, Pedro Ximénez, Gewürztraminer and Muscat of Alexandria.

Chilean winemakers have been developing a distinct style for their Cabernet Sauvignon, producing an easy drinking wine with soft tannins and flavors of mint, black currant, olives and smoke. The country's Chardonnays are less distinctive, following more the stereotypical New World style. While sparkling wines have been made since 1879, they have not yet established a significant place in Chile's wine portfolio. In recent years, the Pais grape variety has been creatively employed on its own or in blends, to make modern wines that have received favorable reviews.

=== Merlot and Sauvignon blanc ===
In the late 20th century as Chilean wines became more popular, wine tasters around the world began to doubt the authenticity of wines labeled Merlot and Sauvignon blanc. The wines lack many of the characteristics and typicity of those grapes. Ampelographers began to study the vines and found that what was considered Merlot was actually the ancient Bordeaux wine grape Carménère that was thought to be extinct. The Sauvignon blanc vines were found to actually be Sauvignonasse, also known as Sauvignon vert, or a mutated Sauvignon blanc/Sémillon cross. In response to these discoveries several Chilean wineries began to import true Merlot and Sauvignon blanc cuttings to where most bottles labeled Merlot and Sauvignon blanc from vintages in the 21st century are more likely to be those varieties.

== International competitions ==
Chilean wines have ranked very highly in international competitions. For example, in the Berlin Wine Tasting of 2004, 36 European experts blind tasted wines from two vintages each of eight top wines from France, Italy and Chile. The first and second place wines were two Cabernet-based reds from Chile: Viñedo Chadwick 2000 and Sena 2001. The Berlin Wine Tasting of 2005 held in Brazil featured five Chilean wines in the top seven. In the Tokyo Wine Tasting of 2006, Chilean wines won four of the top five rankings.

== See also ==
- Chilean wine routes
- Winemaking
- Agriculture in Chile
