= Miguel Torres Chile =

Chilean winery

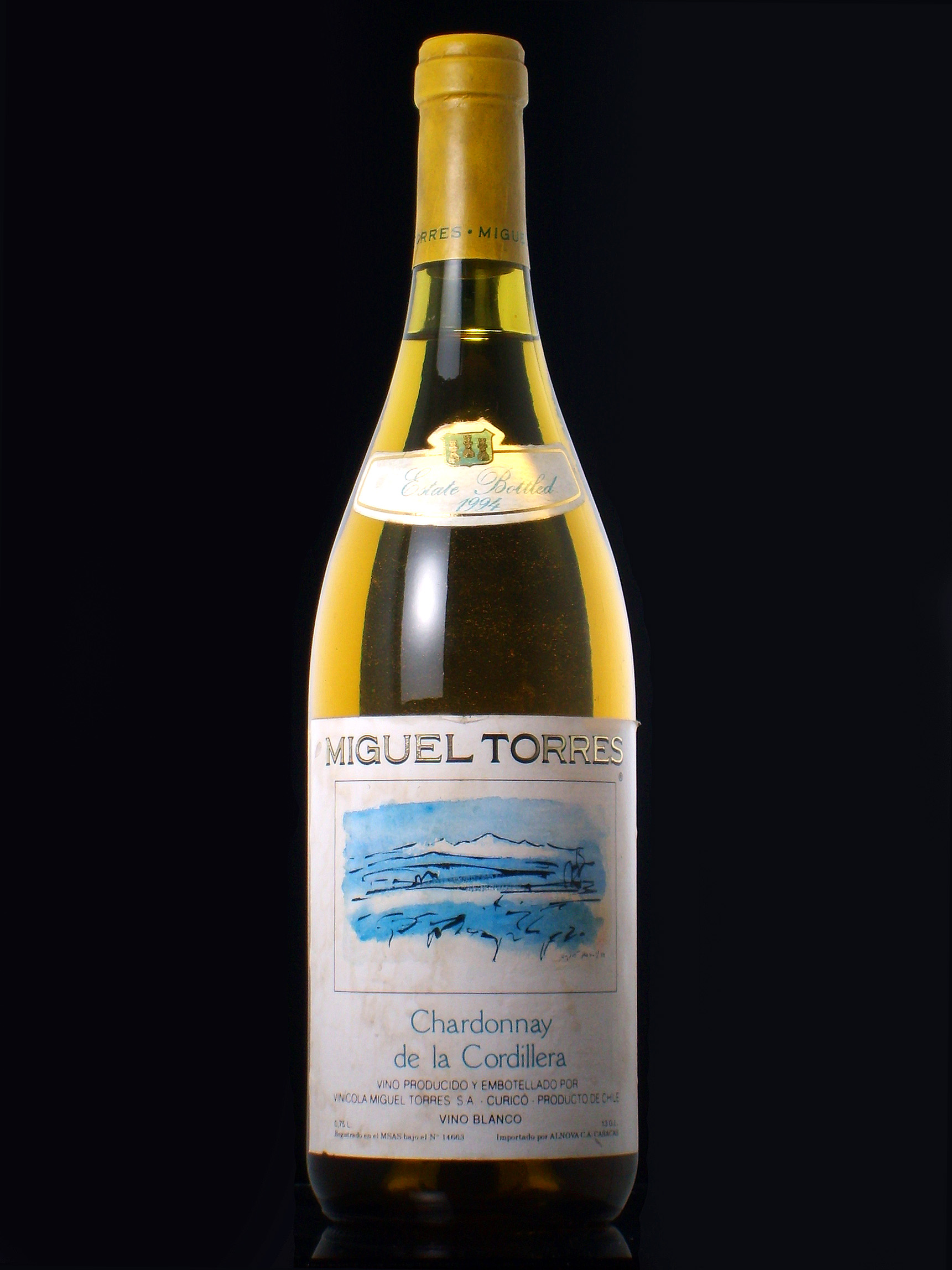
Miguel Torres wine

Miguel Torres Chile is a Chilean winery that was founded in Curicó, in 1979, by the Spanish family company Miguel Torres. In its 230 hectares (570 acres), the Viña Santa Digna vineyard cultivates the varieties Sauvignon blanc, Riesling, Gewürztraminer and Chardonnay (for their white wines) and Cabernet sauvignon (for their red and rosé wines). To a lesser extent they also cultivate Pinot noir, which contributes to the cuvee of a brut sparkling wine.

== Wines ==
As well as the wines that they sell under the Santa Digna brand, the conditions of the Chilean vineyard have also allowed for the selection of a number of single estates or terroirs, such as Manso de Velasco, which produces its Cabernet sauvignon from vines that are over a hundred years old and have never been grafted. All of the wines undergo a fermentation process in stainless steel tanks, with their temperature carefully controlled, and furthermore, in the case of some wines, in the aging cellar in barrels made of American and Nevers French oak.

== Vineyards ==
Miguel Torres Chile have 65 hectares (160 acres) of their own vineyards in the region of Curicó, plus another 215 hectares (530 acres) that are leased out.
