= Maule Valley =

Coordinates: 35.525505°S 71.687175°W

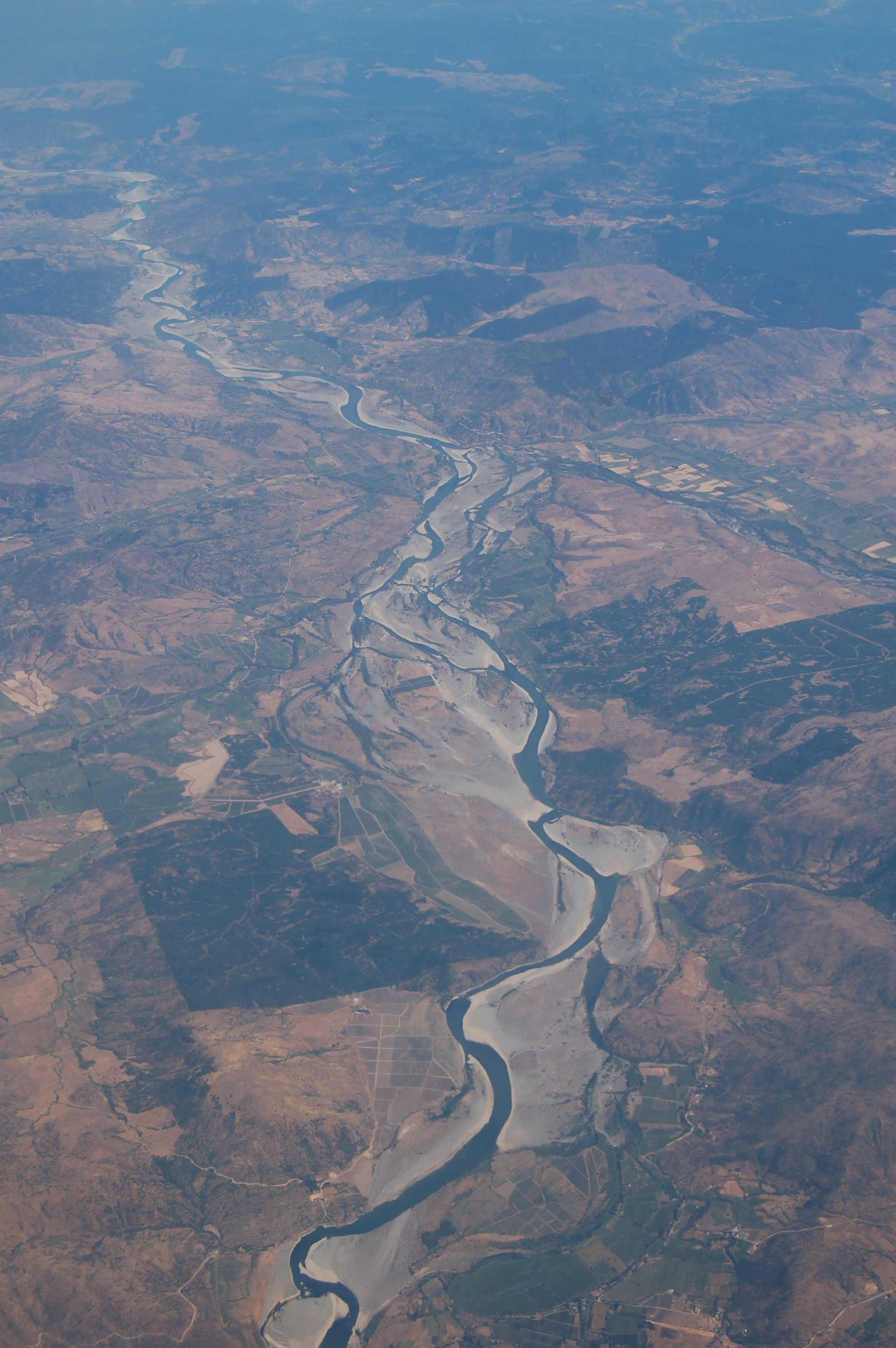
Rio Maule.

Maule Valley is a wine-producing region in Chile's Central Valley and is a Denomination of Origin (DO) as defined by the Chilean Appellation system, the legally defined and protected geographical indication used to identify where the grapes for a wine were grown. The area is located 250 km (155 mi) south of Santiago, Chile’s capital city, and forms part of the Central Valley region. It is one of the largest winegrowing regions in Chile and is also one of the country's oldest and most diverse valleys.

The size of the region permits a range of distinct microclimates suitable for both red and white wines, though it is best known for its powerful Cabernet Sauvignon and aromatic and spicy Carménère wines. Rich and volcanic soils predominate in the area, although certain parts of the valley have varying soil types, like the Empedrado area which is dominated by slate soils.

== History ==
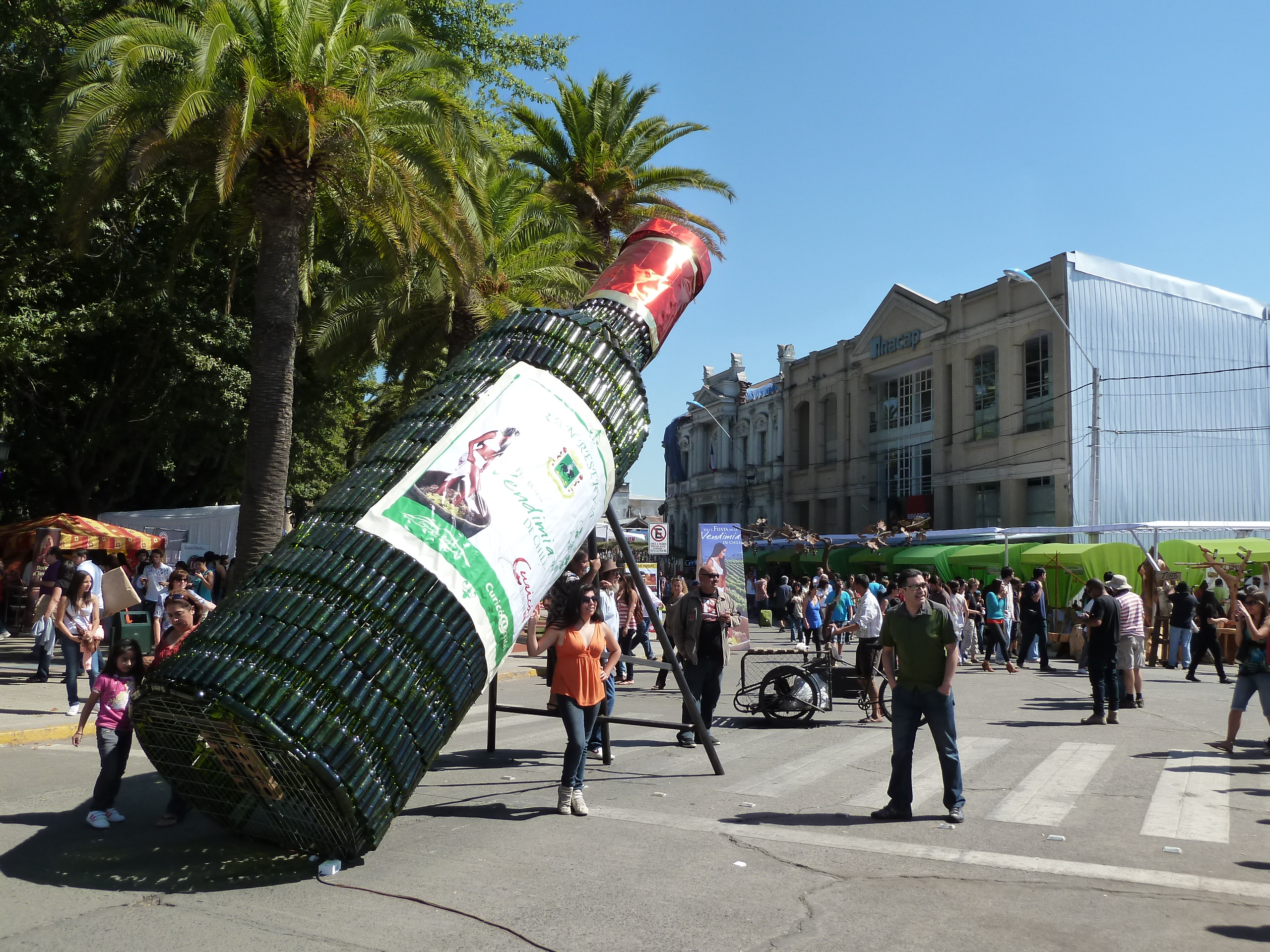
The grape harvest festival called Fiesta de Vendimia.

The Maule Valley was one of the first areas in Chile where vines were planted and its viticulture history stretches back to the start of colonisation. The valley was originally known for the quantity more than the quality of its wines, but in recent years it has attracted renewed attention. Since the mid-1990s, new technologies have been introduced, allowing the region to improve the quality of its wines. Despite this, some of Maule's old techniques have survived and the region is fast becoming known for some 70-year-old Carignan vines that are being used to produce soft, earthy red wines with rich plum and black-fruit flavours.

Maule lies at the southern end of the Central Valley and is one of the coolest wine-producing areas in Chile, although the Maule River flowing east to west has a moderating effect on the climate. The river also provides the different alluvial soil types found around the region, which included granite, red clay, loam and gravel. On the slopes where the vines grow, the soils are free-draining and more fertile on the valley floor.

Many hectares are grown organically and have been certified as organic for decades. The Maule Valley produces good value everyday wines of quality that has been improving over the years. There are also old-bush, dry-farmed vineyards that produce naturally balanced field blends of Carignan, Cabernet Sauvignon, Malbec, and other yet to be identified varieties. Newer plantations include Merlot, Cabernet Franc, and Carménère with bright acidity and juicy fruit notes.

== Grape distribution by varietal ==
Cabernet Sauvignon: 14,475 ha (35769 acres)	Merlot: 2,137 ha (5281 acres)	Carménère: 2,045 ha (5053 acres)
Syrah: 1,182 ha (2921 acres)	Sauvignon Blanc: 2,838 ha (7013 acres)	Chardonnay: 4,631 ha (11443 acres)
Pinot Noir: 380 ha (939 acres)	Mission: 3,364 ha (8313 acres)	Carignan: 377 ha (932 acres)

- Climate: Mediterranean climate. 735 mm (28.9 in) of rain per year.
- Soils: Alluvial soils, clay and sand.
- Primary wines: Cabernet Sauvignon, Merlot, Carménère, and old-vine Carignan.

Total hectares planted: 785 ha (1940 acres)

== See also ==
- Chilean wine
- Maule Region
- Maule River
