= Aconcagua (wine region) =

Wine region in Chile

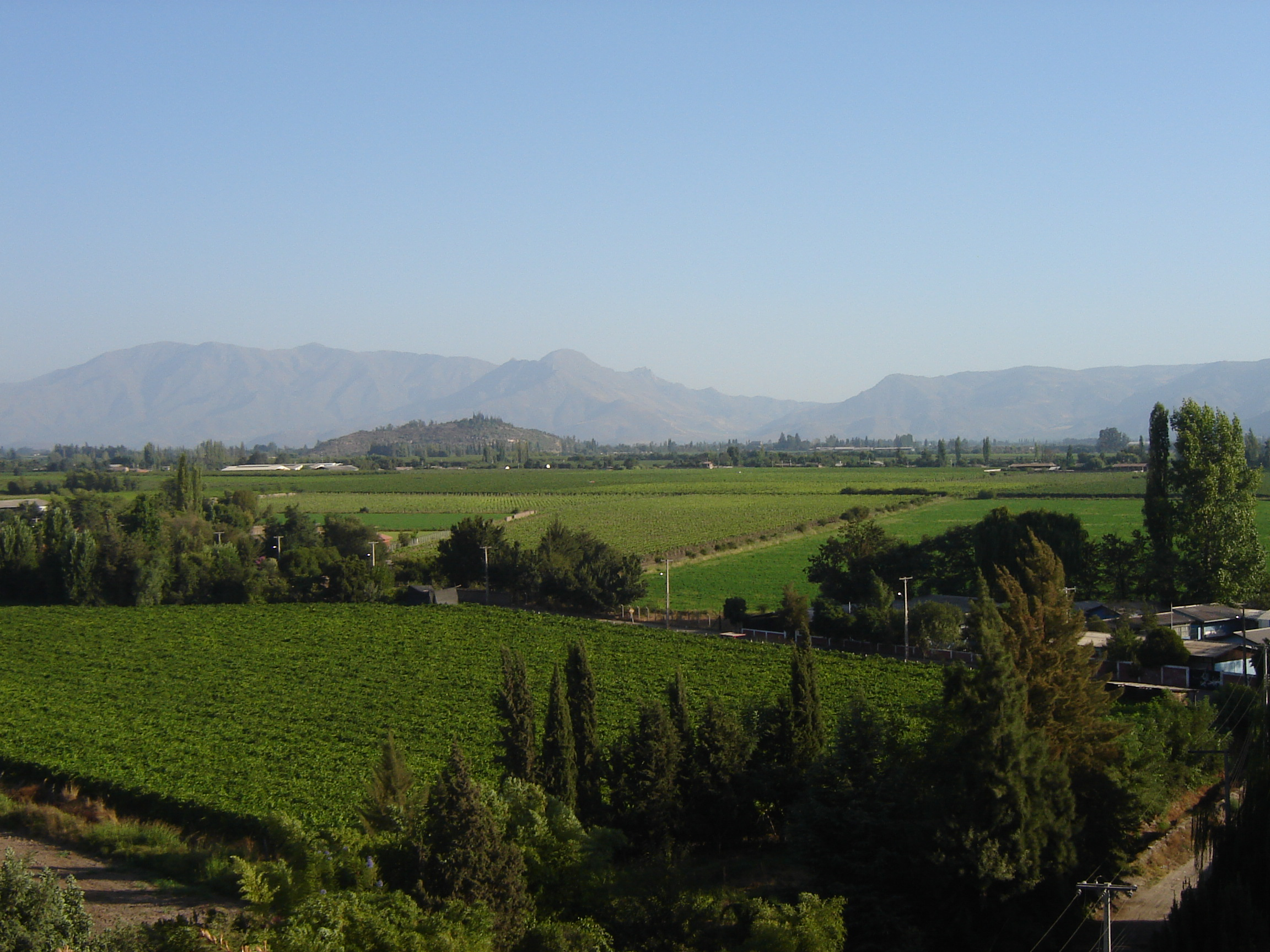
View of Aconcagua Valley, one of the wine districts of Aconcagua wine region

Aconcagua is one of the five principal wine regions of Chile. It takes its name from the Aconcagua River and encompasses all winegrowing areas in Valparaíso Region. The Aconcagua wine region is composed of four minor wine districts: Casablanca Valley, Aconcagua Costa, Aconcagua Valley, and Leyda Valley.

Aconcagua Valley is a wine-producing region located 65 km (40 mi) north of Santiago in the east of the Valparaíso Region. It is a Denomination of Origin (DO) defined by the Chilean Appellation system, the legally defined and protected geographical indication used to identify where the grapes for a wine were grown.

Aconcagua Valley takes its name both from the province where it is located, San Felipe de Aconcagua, and also from the Aconcagua mountain, the highest peak in the Andes at 6,956 meters (22,828 feet). The snow-capped peak of Aconcagua and the surrounding mountains delivers essential melt water to the valley below.

The small, 1,098-hectare winegrowing area is well known for its red wines, which have earned international acclaim, with Vina Errázuriz's “Seña” placing ahead of both Château Lafite and Château Margaux in blind tasting held in Berlin in 2004, a milestone for the Chilean wine industry.

Although the valley is primarily known for the red grapes grown in its interior, white grapes are also now being grown in new coastal plantations.

== Grape distribution by varietal ==
- Climate: Mediterranean, 215 mm (8.5 in) of rainfall per year.
- Soils: clay and sandy to the east; granite and clay to the west.
- Primary grapes: Cabernet Sauvignon, Syrah, Carmenere, and coastal Sauvignon Blanc.

Cabernet Sauvignon: 303 ha (749 acres)	Sauvignon Blanc: 117 ha (289 acres)	Carmenere: 63 ha (156 acres)
Syrah: 155 ha (383 acres)	Pinot Noir: 99 ha (245 acres)	Chardonnay: 64 ha (158 acres)

- Total hectares planted: 952 ha (2,352 acres)
