= Viña Seña =

Chilean winery

- Location: Panquehue, Chile
- Appellation: Aconcagua Valley
- Founded: 1995 (29–30 years ago)
- Key people: Founders: Eduardo Chadwick Claro; Robert Mondavi
- Parent company: Errázuriz Wine Group
- Acres cultivated: 104
- Cases/yr: 5,000
- Known for: Seña Wine
- Website: sena.cl

Seña wine was established as a collaborative venture in Chile between Viña Errázuriz and Robert Mondavi. Since 2005 Seña is owned 100% by the Chadwick family, proprietors of Errázuriz, and is the personal project of Eduardo Chadwick. The vineyard has 42 hectares of cultivated vines, and had sales of 5,000 cases of wine in 2015. Since 2005 it is considered a company that participates in organic farming, through the biodynamic method.

== History ==
Eduardo's ambition is to create a Chilean icon wine, one which fully expresses the terroir (wine identity linked to local soil, aspect and climate) of the Aconcagua Valley north of Santiago. The inaugural vintage of Seña, which is Spanish for distinguishing mark or personal signature, was that of 1995. The wine is made from a blend of six of the classic Bordeaux red grape varieties: Cabernet Sauvignon, Merlot, Carmenère, Cabernet Franc, Petit Verdot and Malbec. The grapes for Seña are sourced from Seña Hillside vineyards within the Aconcagua Valley, in which vines are grown according to bio-dynamic principles. The wine is currently produced at Errázuriz's Don Maximiano Estate winery in the Aconcagua Valley.

== Awards and recognition ==
International:

- 100 points, for blend Sena vintage 2015, by international taster James Suckling in 2017 ranking:
  - Composition: 57 % Cabernet Sauvignon, 21 % Carmenère, 12 % Malbec, 7 % Petit Verdot, and 3 % Cabernet Franc.
- 100 points, for blend Sena vintage 2018, by international taster James Suckling in 2019 ranking:
  - Composition: 55 % Cabernet Sauvignon, 18 % Malbec, 15 % Carmenère, 7 % Cabernet Franc, and 5 % Petit Verdot.
