= Viña Errázuriz =

- Location: Panquehue, Chile
- Appellation: Aconcagua Valley
- Founded: 1870 (155–156 years ago)
- Key people: Founder: Maximiano Errázuriz; President: Eduardo Chadwick Claro
- Parent company: Errázuriz Wine Group
- Cases/yr: 450,000
- Website: errazuriz.com

Viña Errázuriz is a Chilean winery growing grapes in the Aconcagua, Casablanca and Curicó valleys. Chilean entrepreneur and politician Don Maximiano Errázuriz founded Viña Errázuriz in 1870, when he started growing the first wines in the Aconcagua valley. Eduardo Chadwick, of the fifth generation of the family, is president of Viña Errázuriz. In 2019 the company produced an approximate of 450,000 cases of wine per year, which it distributed to 78 countries. The main markets for the company are Europe, United States and Asia, which constituted 85% of the trade in its wine production.

== Awards and recognition ==
- National:
  - Vineyard of the year, in 2008, according to Association Wines of Chile.
- International:
  - 5º most admired wine brand in the World, in 2017 and 2018, according to Drink International.
