= Central Valley (Chilean wine region) =

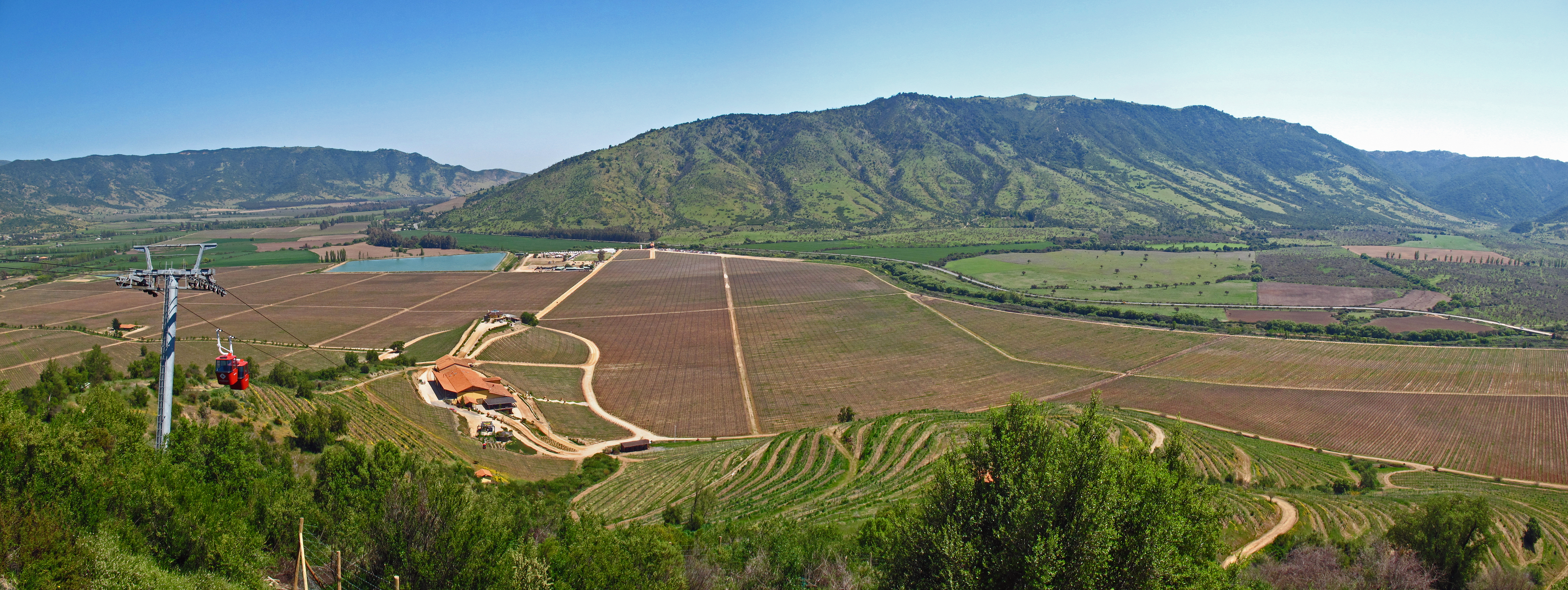
Panoramic view of Viña Santa Cruz in Colchagua Valley in the Chilean Central Valley

In terms of viticulture the Central Valley of Chile (Spanish: Valle Central) spans the O'Higgins Region (VI) and Maule Region (VII) Administrative Regions and the Administrative Metropolitan Region, and is the main growing zone for Chilean wine and coincides with the historical core of the Chilean Central Valley.

== Subregions ==
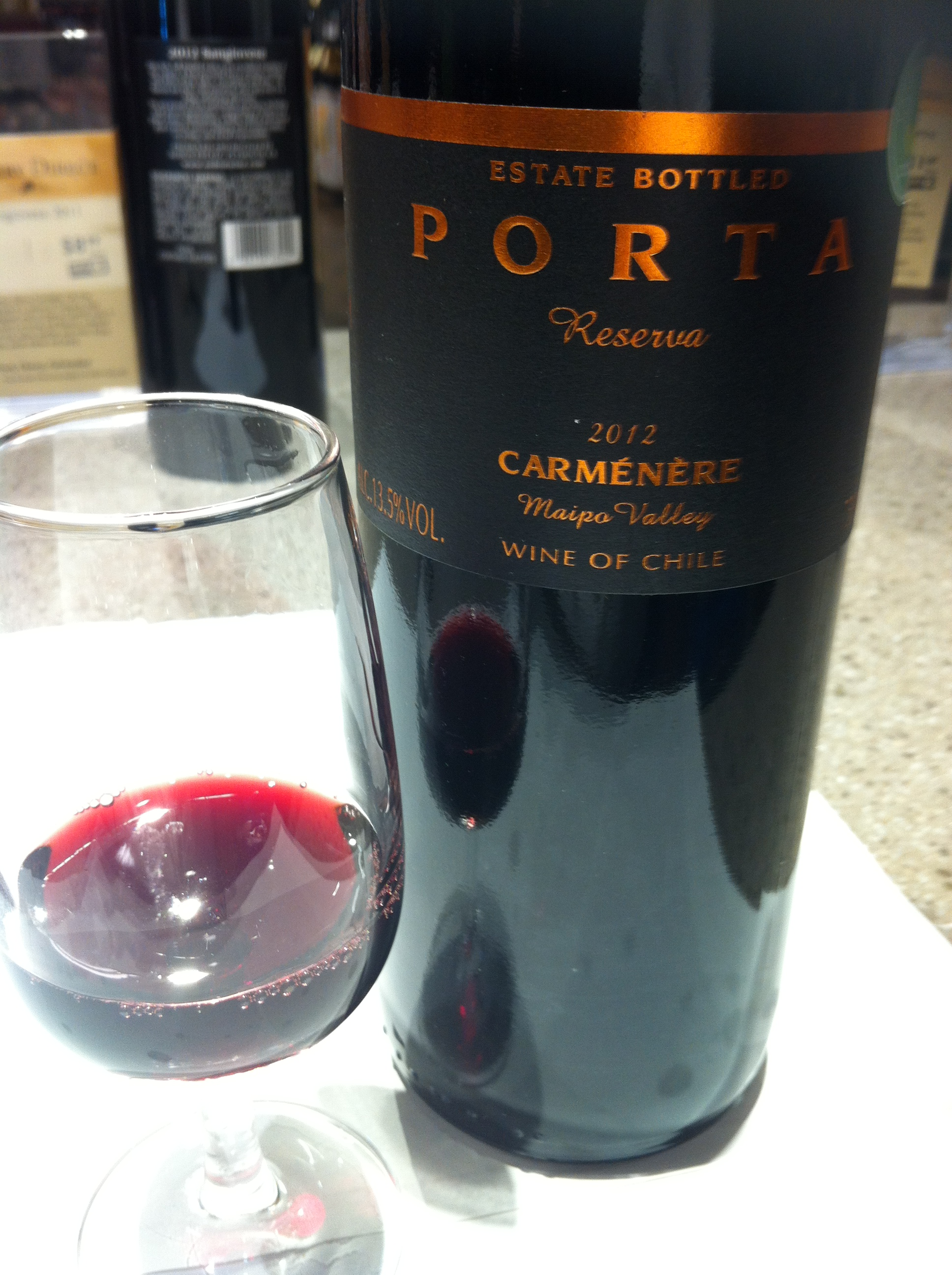
A carmenere from the Maipo Valley.

This is Chile's most productive and internationally known wine region, due predominantly to its proximity to the national capital Santiago. It is located directly across the Andes' from one of Argentina's wine regions: Mendoza Province. Within the Central Valley there are four wine growing subregions: the Maipo Valley, the Rapel Valley, the Curicó Valley and the Maule Valley.

- The Maipo Valley is the most widely cultivated valley and is known for Cabernet Sauvignon.
- The Rapel wine region in the Colchagua Province is known for its Carmenere and Cabernet.
- Curicó has both red and white wine varieties planted but is most widely known for its Chardonnay.
- The Maule Valley has retained large plantings of the local País; gradually it is being replaced with other red wine varieties.

== Soils ==
The soil of Maipo Valley is noted for high salinity stemming from irrigation from the Maipo River and low potassium level which has some impact on the grapevines. Vineyards in the Maule also suffer from low potassium as well as deficient nitrogen levels. Advances in viticultural techniques have helped vineyards in these regions compensate for some of these effects.
