= Carménère =

Variety of grape

- Grape (Vitis)
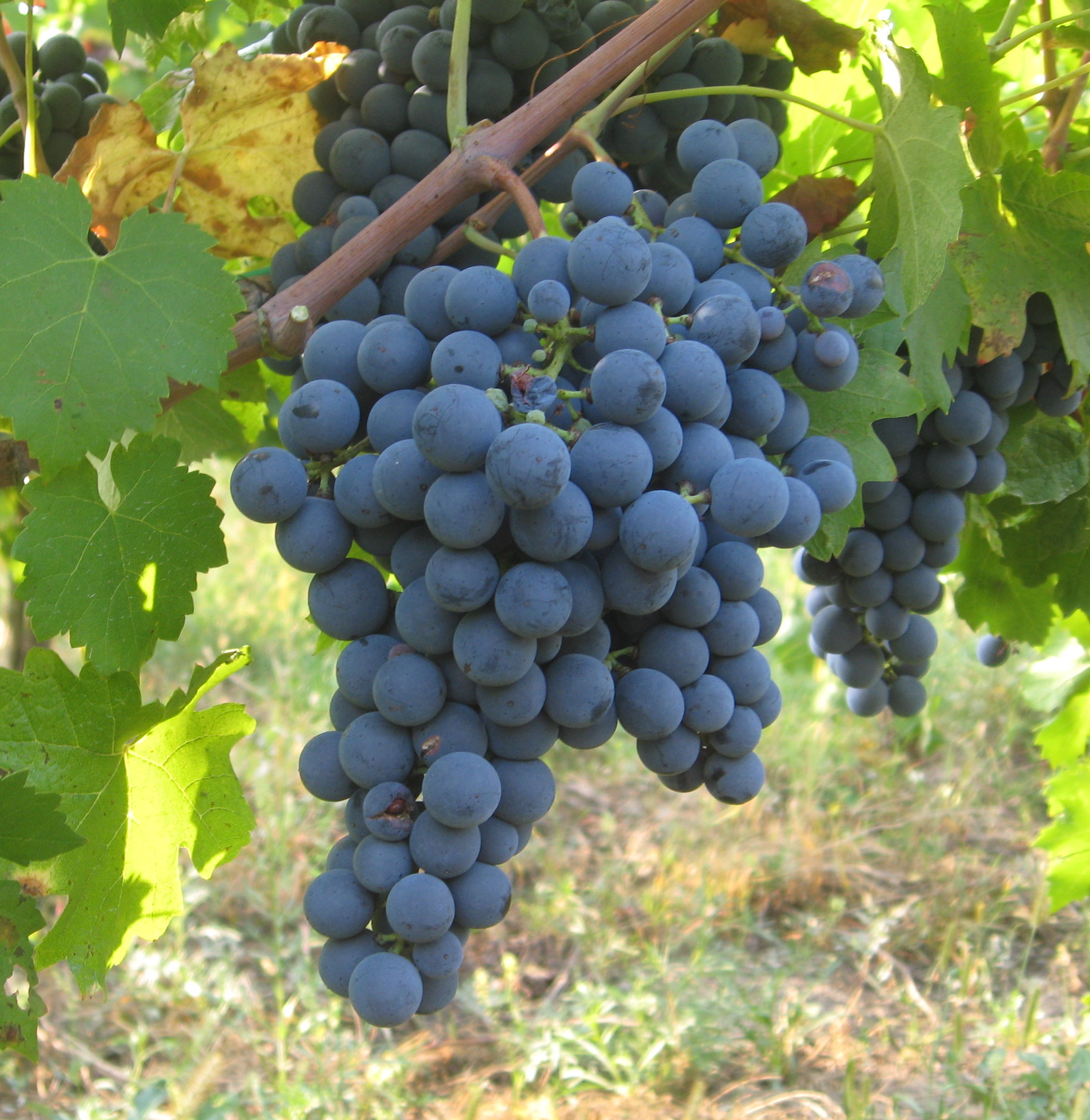
- Carménère grapes
- Species: Vitis vinifera
- Also called: Médoc: Grande Vidure, carméneyre, carmenelle, cabernelle, bouton blanc; Graves: carbouet; carbonet
- Origin: Bordeaux (France)
- Original pedigree: Cabernet Franc × Gros Cabernet (Trousseau Noir)
- Pedigree parent 1: Cabernet Franc
- Pedigree parent 2: Gros Cabernet
- Notable regions: Chile, Italy, Washington, California
- VIVC number: 2109

The Carménère grape is a wine grape variety originally planted in the Médoc region of Bordeaux, France, where it was used to produce deep red wines and occasionally used for blending purposes in the same manner as Petit Verdot.

A member of the Cabernet family of grapes, the name "Carménère" originates from the French word for crimson (carmin) which refers to the brilliant crimson colour of the autumn foliage before leaf-fall. The grape is also known as Grande Vidure, a historic Bordeaux synonym, although current European Union regulations prohibit imports under this name into the European Union. Along with Cabernet Sauvignon, Cabernet Franc, Merlot, Malbec and Petit Verdot, Carménère is considered one of the original six red grapes of Bordeaux.

Now rarely found in France, the world's largest area planted with this variety is in Chile, with more than 8,800 hectares (2009) cultivated in the Central Valley. As such, Chile produces the vast majority of Carménère wines available today and as the Chilean wine industry grows, more experimentation is being carried out on Carménère's potential as a blending grape, especially with Cabernet Sauvignon. It is considered the emblematic strain of Chilean wine.

Carménère is also grown in Italy's Eastern Veneto and Friuli-Venezia Giulia regions, in Argentina, and in smaller quantities in California and Walla Walla (Washington and Oregon) in the United States.

== History ==
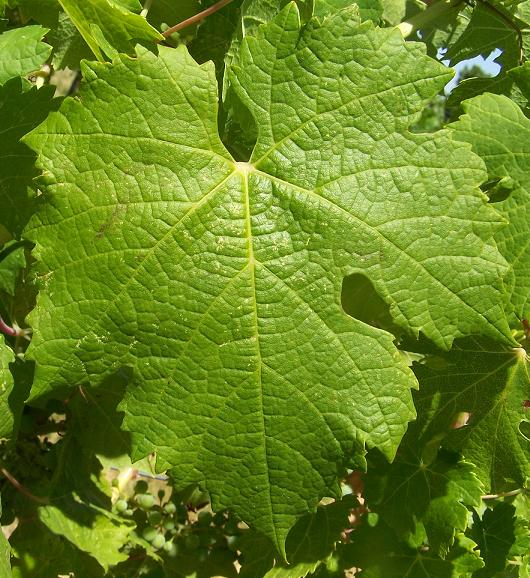
Carménère leaf

One of the most ancient European varieties, Carménère is thought to be the antecedent of other better-known varieties; some consider the grape to be "a long-established clone of Cabernet Sauvignon". It is possible that the variety name is an alias for what is actually the Vidure, a local Bordeaux name for a Cabernet Sauvignon clone once thought to be the grape from which all red Bordeaux varieties originated.

There have also been suggestions that Carménère may be Biturica, a vine praised in ancient Rome and also the name by which the city of Bordeaux was known during that era. This ancient variety originated in Iberia (modern-day Spain and Portugal), according to Pliny the Elder; indeed, it is currently a popular blending variety with Sangiovese in Tuscany called "Predicato di Biturica"

The Carménère grape has known origins in the Médoc region of Bordeaux, France and was also widely planted in the Graves until the vines were struck with oidium. It is almost impossible to find Carménère wines in France today, as a phylloxera plague in 1867 nearly destroyed all the vineyards of Europe, afflicting the Carménère grapevines in particular such that for many years the grape was presumed extinct. When the vineyards were replanted, growers could not replant Carménère as it was extremely hard to find and more difficult to grow than other grape varieties common to Bordeaux. The region's damp, chilly spring weather gave rise to coulure, "a condition endemic to certain vines in climates which have marginal, sometimes cool, wet springs", which prevented the vine's buds from flowering. Yields were lower than other varieties and the crops were rarely healthy; consequently wine growers chose more versatile and less coulure-susceptible grapes when replanting the vines and Carménère planting was progressively abandoned.

== Countries ==
=== Chile ===
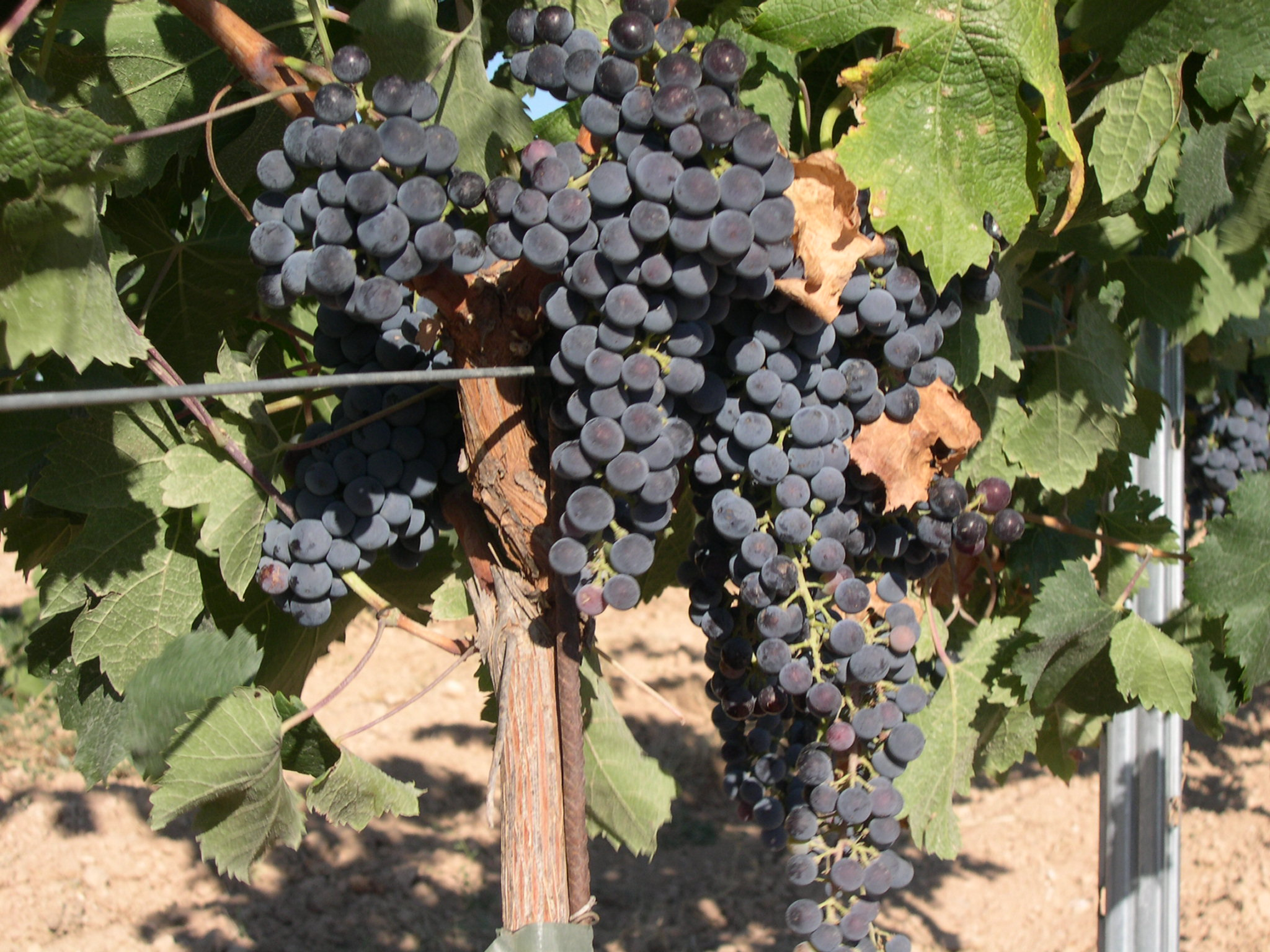
Merlot grapes

Cuttings of Carménère were imported by Chilean growers from Bordeaux during the 19th century, where they were frequently confused with Merlot vines. They modeled their wineries after those in France and in the 1850s cuttings from Bordeaux, which included Carménère grape, were planted in the valleys around Santiago. Thanks to central Chile's minimal rainfall during the growing season and the protection of the country's natural boundaries, growers produced healthier crops of Carménère, and there was no spread of phylloxera. During most of the 20th century Carménère was inadvertently collected and processed together with Merlot grapes (probably reaching up to 50% of the total volume) giving Chilean Merlot markedly different properties from those of Merlot produced elsewhere. Chilean growers believed that this grape was a clone of Merlot and was known as Merlot selection or Merlot Peumal (after the Peumo Valley in Chile). In 1994, Carménère was re-discovered as a distinct varietal in Chile by French ampelographist Jean Boursiquot, a researcher at Montpellier's school of Oenology. The Chilean Department of Agriculture officially recognized Carménère as a distinct variety in 1998. Today, Carménère grows chiefly in the Colchagua Valley, Rapel Valley, and Maipo Province.

=== Italy ===
A similar situation occurred in Italy when, in 1990, the Ca' del Bosco Winery acquired what they thought was Cabernet Franc vines from a French nursery. The growers noticed that the grapes were different from the traditional Cabernet Franc both in color and taste. They also noticed that the vines ripened earlier than Cabernet Franc would have. Other Italian wine regions also started to doubt the origin of these vines and it was finally established to be Carménère. Although, in Italy, the variety is grown mainly in the northeast part of the country from Brescia to Friuli, it has only recently been entered into Italy's national catalog of vine varieties and thus "no district has yet requested the authorization to use it". Therefore, the wine "cannot be cultivated with its original name or specific vintage and the name cannot be used to identify the wine on the label with an IGT, DOC or a DOCG status assignment". Ca' del Bosco Winery names the wine it produces Carmenero. In 2007 the grape was authorised to be used in Italian DOC wines from Veneto (Arcole, Bagnoli di Sopra, Cori Benedettine del Padovano, Garda, Merlara, Monti Lessini, Riviera del Brenta and Vicenza), Friuli-Venezia Giulia (Collio, or Collio Goriziano) and Sardinia (Alghero). Since a ministerial decree of 2009, producers of Piave DOC wines in 50 communes of the Province of Treviso, and 12 in the Province of Venice have been permitted where appropriate to specify the variety Carmenère on the wine label.

=== Other regions ===
In modern-day France only a few hundred acres of Carménère officially exist, although there are rumors of renewed interest among growers in Bordeaux.

Carménère has also been established in Eastern Washington's Walla Walla Valley and in California, United States. In the 1980s, Karen Mulander-Magoon, the co-proprietor of Guenoc and Langtry Estates Winery, in California's Lake County, brought the grape to the vineyard. This was a joint effort with Louis Pierre Pradier, "a French research scientist and viticulturalist whose work involved preserving Carménère from extinction in France". Once the vines were quarantined and checked for diseases they were legalized for admission into California in the 1990s, where they were cloned and planted.

In Australia, three cuttings of Carménère were imported from Chile by renowned viticultural expert Dr Richard Smart in the late 1990s. After two years in quarantine, only one cutting survived the heat treatment to eliminate viruses and was micro-propagated (segments of individual buds grown on nutrient gel) and field grown by Narromine Vine Nursery. The first vines from the nursery were planted in 2002 by Amietta Vineyard and Winery in the Moorabool Valley (Geelong, Victoria) who use Carménère in their Angels' Share blend.

Carménère has also been established in small amounts in New Zealand. DNA testing confirmed in 2006 that plantings of Cabernet Franc in the Matakana region were in fact Carménère.

Lozärn Wines, situated on Doornbosch farm in the Robertson region of the Western Cape, is the champion of the Carménère grape variety in South Africa. Their first planting of a Carménère vineyard was in 2014. From this vineyard the first single-varietal Carménère was produced in South Africa. Lozärn Wines, owned by the Smuts family, produces both a single-varietal Carménère as well as a rosé Carménère. The estate launched their maiden vintage of the single-varietal Carménère in December 2017 with only 100 bottles, as well as a 100 per cent Carménère Rosé 2017. Lozärn has only half a hectare currently producing the red and rosé, and has another 1.8ha planted. South Africa has only 8.5ha planted of this lost child of Bordeaux.

== Viticulture ==
Carménère favors a long growing season in moderate to warm climates. During harvest time and the winter period the vine fares poorly if it is introduced to high levels of rain or irrigation water. This is particularly true in poor-soil plantings where the vine would need more water. Over-watering during this period accentuates the herbaceous and green pepper characteristics of the grape. The grape naturally develops high levels of sugar before the tannins achieve ripeness. If grown in too hot a climate the resulting wine will have a high alcohol level and low balance. Carménère buds and flowers three to seven days later than Merlot and the yield is lower than that of the latter grape. The Carménère leaves turn to crimson before dropping.

Carménère is produced in wineries either as a single-variety wine (sometimes called a varietal wine), or as a blend usually with Cabernet Sauvignon, Cabernet franc or Merlot.

== Distinction from Merlot ==
Differences between Carménère and Merlot grapes

Genetic research has shown that Carménère may be distantly related to Merlot and the similarities in appearance have linked the two vines for centuries. Despite the similarities, there are some noticeable differences that aid the ampelographer in identifying the two vines. When young, Carménère leaves have a reddish hue underneath, while the leaves of Merlot are white. There are also slight differences in leaf shape with the central lobe of Merlot leaves being longer. Merlot ripens two to three weeks earlier than Carménère. In cases where the vineyards are interspersed with both varieties, the time of harvest is paramount in determining the character of the resulting blends. If Merlot grapes are picked when Carménère is fully ripe, they will be overripe and impart a "jammy" character. If the grapes are picked earlier when only the Merlot grapes have reached ripeness, the Carménère will have an aggressive green pepper flavor.

Thus, although different, Merlot and Carménère were often confused but never thought to be identical. Its distinctive differences meant the grape was called a "Merlot selection" or "Merlot Peumal", which was "a geographic reference to a valley south of Santiago where lots of Carménère was grown" before its true identity was established.

== Characteristics ==
Carménère wine has a deep red color and aromas found in red fruits, spices and berries. The tannins are gentler and softer than those in Cabernet Sauvignon and it is a medium body wine. As a result, many find it can be drunk easily with fish. Although mostly used as a blending grape, wineries do bottle a pure varietal Carménère which, when produced from grapes at optimal ripeness, imparts a cherry-like, fruity flavor with smoky, spicy and earthy notes and a deep crimson color. Its taste might also be reminiscent of dark chocolate, tobacco, and leather. The wine is best to drink while it is young.
