= Francisco Ramón Vicuña =

Chilean political figure

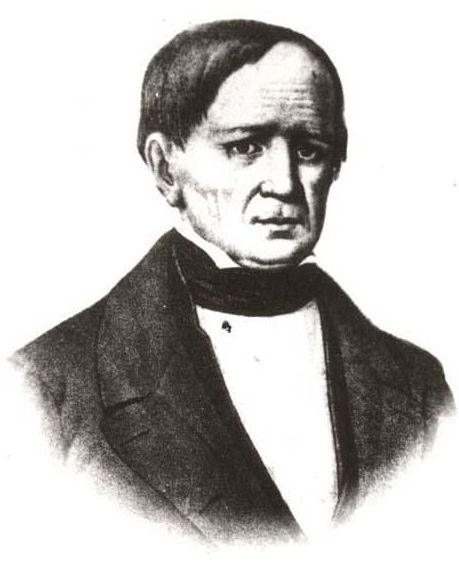

Acting President of Chile
- In office 2 November 1829 – 7 December 1829
- Preceded by: Francisco Antonio Pinto
- Succeeded by: José Tomás Ovalle

President Delegate of Chile
- In office 16 July 1829 – 19 October 1829
- Preceded by: Francisco Antonio Pinto
- Succeeded by: Francisco Antonio Pinto

President of the Senate of Chile
- In office 1829–1829
- Preceded by: José María Vásquez de Novoa
- Succeeded by: Fernando Errázuriz Aldunate

Minister of Government and Foreign Affairs
- In office 1825–1826
- President: Ramón Freire
- Preceded by: Francisco Antonio Pinto
- Succeeded by: Juan de Dios Vial del Río

Minister of War and Navy
- In office 1825–1825
- President: Ramón Freire
- Preceded by: Francisco Antonio Pinto
- Succeeded by: José María Vásquez de Novoa

Member of the Senate of Chile
- In office 1814–1814

Member of the First National Congress of Chile
- In office 1811–1811
- Constituency: Osorno

Personal details
- Born: 9 September 1775 Santiago, Captaincy General of Chile, Spanish Empire
- Died: 13 January 1849 (aged 73) Santiago, Chile
- Party: Liberal Party
- Spouse: Mariana de Aguirre
- Children: 11
- Parent(s): Francisco de Vicuña Hidalgo y Zavala; María del Carmen Larraín Salas y Vicuña
- Relatives: Joaquín Vicuña Larraín (brother)
- Occupation: Politician, military officer

Francisco Ramón de Vicuña Larraín (Latin American Spanish: [fɾanˈsisko raˈmom biˈkuɲa]; September 9, 1775 – January 13, 1849) was a Chilean political figure. He served twice as acting President of Chile in 1829. Francisco Vicuña was of Basque descent.

== Early life ==
He was born in Santiago in 1775, the son of Francisco de Vicuña Hidalgo y Zavala and of María del Carmen Larraín Salas y Vicuña. He married Mariana de Aguirre, and had 11 children with her.

In 1810, Vicuña participated in Chile's war for independence and organized the first firearms production in the country. In 1811, he represented Osorno in the congress, which was to give Chile a constitution, in 1814, he moved to the Senate of Chile. Then, he was arrested for conspiracy against the Spanish crown and banished into exile. Only after Chile's victory at the battle of Chacabuco in 1817, was he able to return to his homeland. Bernardo O'Higgins appointed him as a government representative to the northern provinces.

== Political life ==
In 1823 he became the head of the administration of Santiago and then as a delegate to the constitutional convention that year. He was one of the main defenders of the Federalist position championed by José Miguel Infante y Rojas. In 1825 the Supreme Director of Chile Ramón Freire appointed him to be his deputy as well as foreign and interior minister and at times acting war, naval, and finance minister.

In 1829, when Francisco Antonio Pinto was elected President of Chile, the runners-up were Francisco Ruiz-Tagle Portales, a liberal federalist, and José Joaquín Prieto Vial, a conservative centralist, who both received the same number of votes. Nonetheless, congress, the majority of which was liberal, declared Joaquín Vicuña Larraín, a distant third and brother of Francisco Ramón (who was president of the senate) Vice President of Chile. The centralists outraged decided for armed resistance and the Chilean Civil War of 1829 broke out.

In the ensuing civil war between the conservative centralists and the liberal federalists, Pinto was forced twice to leave the post of president to Vicuña. First, from July 14 to October 19, when Vicuña assumed as President Delegate, and then finally when he resigned on November 2 and Vicuña assumed power. On December 7, 1829 the conservative troops under José Joaquín Prieto Vial approached Santiago from the South. The government under Vicuña fled northward to Coquimbo, where they were, however, imprisoned by the victorious conservative troops. Then, Chile was without a leader for a few weeks (from December 7 to 24, 1829) until a Government Junta was organized and took control under José Tomás Ovalle.

Under the centralist governments of José Joaquín Prieto Vial and Manuel Bulnes, the liberal Vicuña could not hold any governmental positions. He died in Santiago on January 13, 1849.

=== Cabinet ===
The Vicuña Cabinet
Office	Name	Term
President	Francisco Ramón Vicuña	16 July 1829–7 December 1829
Minister of Government & Foreign Affairs	Melchor José Ramos	16 July 1829–9 November 1829
José Nicolás de la Cerda	9 November 1829–7 December 1829
Secretary of War	José Santiago Muñoz	16 July 1829–9 November 1829
José Antonio Pérez-Cotapos	9 November 1829–7 December 1829
Secretary of Navy	José Manuel Calderón	16 July 1829–7 December 1829
Minister of Finance	Manuel José Huici	16 July 1829–9 November 1829
Pedro José Prado	9 November 1829–7 December 1829

== See also ==
- Vicuña family
- Chilean Civil War of 1829
- Chilean Civil War of 1829–1830

== Sources ==
- Figueroa, Pedro Pablo (1901). Diccionario Biográfico de Chile (PDF) (in Spanish). Vol. III. Santiago, Chile: Imprenta i Encuadernación Barcelona. p. 449.
- Pilleux Cepeda, Mauricio. "Recopilación de Genealogia Chilena" (in Spanish).
