= Fernando Baquedano =

Chilean politician and general (1796–1862)

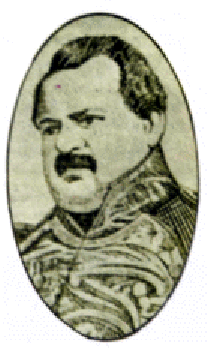
- Born: May 28, 1796; Santiago, Viceroyalty of Peru
- Died: October 20, 1862 (aged 66); Concepción, Chile

General Fernando Baquedano Rodríguez (May 28, 1796 – October 20, 1862) was a Chilean military and political figure who served in the Chilean War of Independence and the War of the Confederation. Fernando Baquedano was of Basque descent; his ascendants came from Abarzuza.

Fernando Baquedano was born in Santiago, the son of Miguel Baquedano y Zebreros and of Isidora Rodríguez Rojas. Miguel Baquedano was born in Leon, Nicaragua in 1772 and sailed to Santiago to farm sheep in 1791. Miguel Baquedano was the son of Navarrese settler and sailor Jose Juan Baquedano who sailed to Honduras from Pontevedra, Spain in 1763, moving on to San Salvador before finally settling down in Nicaragua. In 1808, at the age of 12, the adolescent Fernando joined the ranks of the Queen's Dragoons. Baquedano took part in the movement for independence from the very beginning, and during the Chilean War of Independence he served under both José Miguel Carrera and Bernardo O'Higgins in the siege of Chillán, and the battles of El Roble, Quirihue and Cauquenes (1813), Gomero, Alto del Quilo, Paso del Maule, Tres Montes y Quechereguas (1814). After the defeat of Rancagua he was forced, together with other patriots, to emigrate to Mendoza, Argentina.

Once there he joined the Army of the Andes, and fought in the battles of Chacabuco and Talcahuano (1817), Cancha Rayada and Maipu (1818). He married Teresa González de Labra y Ros on July 18, 1819, and together they had three sons, among them the future general Manuel Baquedano. After the death of his first wife, he married for a second time on June 27, 1848, to Mercedes Concha Fuentealba, with whom he had another 6 children.

Between 1823 and 1824, Baquedano participated in the Peruvian War of Independence and later under General Ramón Freire in the capture of Chiloé (1826) and all the campaigns between 1827 and 1829. During the Chilean Civil War of 1829 he served under the banners of General José Joaquín Prieto, and fought at the battles of Ochagavía (1829) and Lircay (1830). During the War of the Confederation, he fought under Manuel Bulnes at the battles of Portada de Guías (1838) and Yungay (1839) where he was injured and promoted to Brigadier General.

At the Chilean Revolution of 1851, he was the head of General José María de la Cruz's rebel army general staff, while the government troops were under the command of General Manuel Bulnes, of whom Baquedano's son Manuel was personal adjutant. The rebel army was defeated at the battle of Loncomilla in December 1851. There, he and his son Eleuterio Baquedano where wounded and captured in battle. He was subsequently pardoned by President Manuel Montt and reincorporated to the service.

In 1858, Baquedano retired completely from the army, and was named a member of the Martial Court of Appeals of Concepción. He died of a stroke at his home in Concepción, at the age of 66.

== See also ==
- Manuel Baquedano
- Eleuterio Baquedano
