= Juan Francisco Meneses =

Chilean priest and political figure

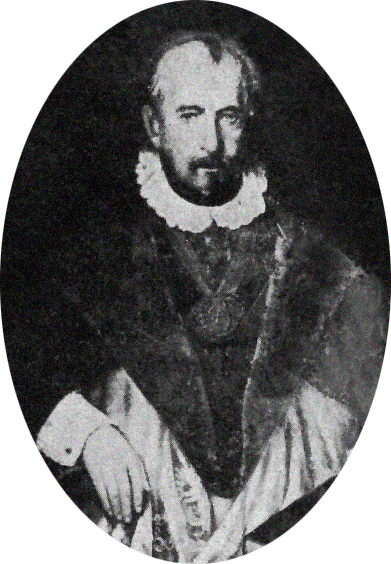
- Born: June 24, 1785; Santiago, Chile
- Died: December 25, 1860 (aged 75); Santiago, Chile

Juan Francisco Meneses Echanes (June 24, 1785 – December 25, 1860) was a Chilean priest and political figure.

== Early life ==
Meneses was born in Santiago, the son of José Ignacio Meneses and of Micaela Echanes. He studied humanities, philosophy and law (both civil and canonic) at the Convictorio de San Carlos, and later graduated from the Universidad de San Felipe on August 29, 1804 as a doctor in "both sciences" (Doctor in Civil and Canonic Law.) In 1808 he married Carmen Bilbao, with whom he had several children. The same year he was named secretary to Royal Governor Francisco García Carrasco. After the dismissal of Governor García Carrasco, he was named legal and military aide to the Intendent of Concepción.

When the Chilean independence movement swept the country, he joined the Royalist side. In 1812, he was named secretary of the New Appeals Court (Tribunal de Apelaciones), the body that replaced the colonial Appeals Court (Real Audiencia), and later became Minister of the Supreme Court of Justice. Royal Governor Francisco Marcó del Pont appointed him as his secretary in 1815, but after the Battle of Chacabuco put an end to the Royal power in Chile, he went into exile to Lima, Peru where he privately practiced law and became a secretary to the Viceroy. While there he became a widower.

== Political participation ==
After the death of his wife, he started his theology studies in Cuzco but returned to Santiago in 1821, being finally ordained as a priest on April 21, 1822. He was named rector of Santa Rosa de Los Andes. He was elected a deputy for Los Andes in 1823 and reelected in 1826 and 1829. In 1827, he was named rector of the Instituto Nacional and professor of the Universidad de San Felipe. During this period, he became the principal voice of the clergy, discontented with the new republican order, in replacement of the exiled Bishop Santiago Rodríguez Zorrilla. As such, he participated in the conspiracies that led to the Chilean Civil War of 1829.

En 1829 he was named secretary to the victorious Conservative Government Junta. In 1830, President Francisco Ruiz-Tagle named him first Minister of the Interior and Foreign Affairs and later President José Tomás Ovalle named him Minister of Finance. He was reelected to congress again in 1830 and elected as a Senator for Aconcagua in 1831. In 1833 he was secretary of the Constitutional Assembly that redacted and promulgated the new constitution. Meneses was again reelected as a Senator in 1834 and successively until 1849. He was also a journalist who wrote in the El Araucano and the La Gaceta del Rey and was in charge of the National Museum.

In March 1830 he became the last rector of the Universidad de San Felipe and after this institution was replaced by the Universidad de Chile in 1843, he became first vice-rector and after 1846 he also was Dean of the School of Law and Political Sciences, position he retained until 1855. In 1856 he was one of the members of the clergy who sued the Archbishop of Santiago Rafael Valentín Valdivieso over the expulsion of verger Pedro Santelices. In October 1859 he was named Dean and Vicar of the Cathedral of Santiago. He died in Santiago on Christmas Day of 1860, aged 75.

Political offices
Preceded by José Nicolás de la Cerda	Minister of the Interior and Foreign Affairs; 1830	Succeeded by Diego Portales
Preceded by Mariano Egaña	Minister of Finance; 1830	Succeeded by Manuel Rengifo
