= José Tomás Ovalle =

Chilean political figure

José Tomás Ovalle y Bezanilla
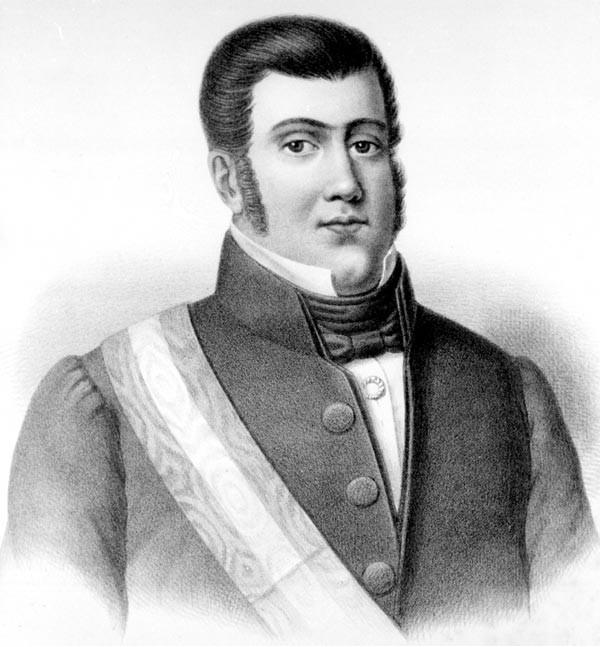

President of Government Junta of Chile
- In office December 24, 1829 – February 18, 1830
- Preceded by: Acephalous executive
- Succeeded by: Francisco Ruiz-Tagle Portales

Acting President of Chile
- In office April 1, 1830 – March 8, 1831
- Vice President: Fernando Errázuriz Aldunate
- Preceded by: Francisco Ruiz-Tagle Portales
- Succeeded by: Fernando Errázuriz Aldunate

Personal details
- Born: December 21, 1787 Santiago, Chile
- Died: March 21, 1831 (aged 43) Santiago, Chile
- Spouse: Rafaela Bezanilla Bezanilla

José Tomás Ovalle y Bezanilla (Latin American Spanish: [xoˈse toˈmas oˈβaʝe]; December 21, 1787 – March 21, 1831) was a Chilean political figure. He served twice as provisional president of Chile.

== Early life ==
He was born in Santiago, the son of Vicente María Ovalle Guzmán and of María del Rosario Bezanilla y Noriega. He studied in the Convictorio Carolino and law at the Universidad de San Felipe, where he obtained his doctorate in both laws in 1809. He married his cousin, Rafaela Bezanilla Bezanilla on April 1, 1812, and had eleven children.

Ovalle was twice elected deputy for Santiago (1823 and 1824–1825), supplementary senador (1824), Vice presidente of the Provincial Assembly of Santiago and was a delegate to the Plenipotentiaries Congress of 1830, being elected vice president.

== Civil War of 1829 ==
When the Chilean Civil War of 1829 broke out between the conservative centralists and the liberal federalists, President Francisco Antonio Pinto was forced twice to leave the post of president to Francisco Ramón Vicuña Larraín. First, from July 14 to October 19, when Vicuña assumed power as President Delegate, and then finally when he resigned on November 2 and Vicuña assumed full power.

On December 7, 1829, the conservative troops under General José Joaquín Prieto Vial, commander of the southern army, approached Santiago from the South. The conservative army decided to halt the march onto Santiago for a while and camped a few miles outside the city. The government under Vicuña fled northward to Coquimbo. On December 14, 1829, General Prieto and his troops met the liberal army under Francisco de la Lastra and defeated them at the Battle of Ochagavía. Then, the two military leaders signed a peace treaty, which complicated the political situation further. Meanwhile, President Vicuña and his ministers were imprisoned by the victorious conservative troops in Valparaíso.

== First administration ==
Chile was without a leader for a few weeks (from December 7 to 24, 1829) until a Government Junta was organized and took control, in order to avoid the continuance of hostilities, under a neutral José Tomás Ovalle who was acceptable to both sides. This junta ruled the country from December 24, 1829, to February 18, 1830. Finally an agreement was found with the involvement of Ramón Freire which nominated Francisco Ruiz-Tagle Portales as acting president.

== Second administration ==
Because of internal dissent with his ministers, Ruiz-Tagle Portales resigned six weeks later on March 31, 1830, and was succeeded by vice president Ovalle who assumed as a transitional president, and held the position until the advanced state of his tuberculosis forced him to ask for a constitutional leave on March 8, 1831. He died almost two weeks later on March 21, 1831 at 9 AM, and his remains were interred under the altar of the Santiago Cathedral, where they were lost during the renovations of the 19th century and found again in 2004.

After José Tomás Ovalle died, he was replaced by the President of the Plenipotentiaries Congress, Fernando Errázuriz Aldunate, who took over on March 31, 1831, with the title of Accidental Vice President of the Republic. Errázuriz Aldunate called new elections, where General José Joaquín Prieto Vial was elected. General Prieto was installed on September 18, 1831, and thus began the era of the decade governments.

== Cabinet ==
The Ovalle Cabinet
Office	Name	Term
President	José Tomás Ovalle y Bezanilla	1 April 1830–8 March 1831
Minister of the Interior & Foreign Affairs	Diego Portales	5 April 1830–31 August 1831
Minister of War & Navy	Diego Portales	5 April 1830–25 September 1830
Colonel José María de la Cruz	25 September 1830–24 March 1831
Minister of Finance	Pbtro. Juan Francisco Meneses	18 March 1830–15 June 1830
Manuel Rengifo	15 June 1830–9 November 1835

Political offices
Preceded by Francisco Ramón Vicuña Larraín	President of the Government Junta of Chile; 1829–1830	Succeeded by Francisco Ruiz-Tagle Portales
Preceded by Francisco Ruiz-Tagle Portales	President of Chile; 1830–1831	Succeeded by Fernando Errázuriz Aldunate
