= Government Junta of Chile (1829) =

Short-lived Chilean government

Government Junta of Chile (Spanish: Junta de Gobierno; December 24, 1829 – February 18, 1830) was the political structure established to rule Chile following the defeat of the Liberal army at the Battle of Ochagavía. It ruled the country until February 18, 1830, when Francisco Ruiz-Tagle assumed as the role of acting president.

== Creation ==
When the Chilean Civil War of 1829 broke out between the conservative centralists and the liberal federalists, President Francisco Antonio Pinto was forced twice to leave the post of president to Francisco Ramón Vicuña. First, from July 14 to October 19, when Vicuña assumed as President Delegate, and then finally when he resigned on November 2 and Vicuña assumed power.

On December 7, 1829 the conservative troops under General José Joaquín Prieto, commander of the southern army, approached Santiago from the South. The conservative army decided to halt the march onto Santiago for a while and camped a few miles outside the city. The government under Vicuña fled northward towards Coquimbo but were captured before arriving there. On December 14, 1829 General Prieto and his troops met the liberal army under Francisco de la Lastra and defeated them at the Battle of Ochagavía.

After the battle, the two military leaders, Prieto and de la Lastra, signed a peace treaty which complicated the political situation further since the real decision power on the Liberal side was in the hands of Ramón Freire and not in the de la Lastra, who acted in this matter without previous consent. Meanwhile, President Vicuña and his ministers were imprisoned by the victorious conservative troops in Valparaíso.

Chile was without a leader for a few weeks (from December 7 to 24, 1829) until a Government Junta was organized and took control, under a neutral José Tomás Ovalle (the only one who was acceptable to both sides), in order to avoid the continuance of hostilities.

== Members ==
| Position | Name |
|---|---|
| President | José Tomás Ovalle y Bezanilla |
| Member | Isidoro de Errázuriz Aldunate |
| Member | José María Guzmán Ibáñez |

== History ==
This junta ruled the country from December 24, 1829 to February 18, 1830. Real power was still retained by Ramón Freire who organized a liberal convention with the intention of calling for new general elections and the formation of a new Congress. At the same time, the conservatives who were in control of Santiago also called for their own convention, where an agreement was reached between Ramón Freire and José Antonio Rodríguez Aldea, head of the O'Higgins party, which nominated Francisco Ruiz-Tagle as acting president.

=== See also ===
- History of Chile
- List of Government Juntas of Chile
- List of Heads of State
