= José Antonio Vidaurre =

Chilean army commander born in 1798

Colonel José Antonio Vidaurre Garretón (December 22, 1798 - July 4, 1837) was a Chilean military officer who led a failed insurrection in 1837 that culminated in the assassination of minister Diego Portales.

== Early life and family ==
He was born in Concepción, the son of Juan Manuel Vidaurre Ugalde de la Concha and Isabel Garretón. In 1813, at the age of 15, he joined the Chilean militia and fought in the Chilean War of Independence as a private, under General Juan Gregorio de las Heras. His bravery helped him win fast promotion, and by 1817 he was already a full captain. He participated in the Battles of Talcahuano and Cancha Rayada, and finally at Maipú in 1818. He married Valentina Palma and they had four children: Filemón, Emilio, Josefa and Isabel.

== Military career ==
By 1820 he was a member of the Chilean Army General Staff. As such he participated in the campaigns to capture Chiloé, where he was promoted to Sergeant Major. In 1830, after participating in the battles of Osorno and Lircay, he was promoted to colonel.

Although he had a brilliant military career, he was involved in several mutinies against his superiors. In 1823, he participated of a rebellion against General José Joaquín Prieto in Rancagua. In 1828 he joined the rebellion against President Francisco Antonio Pinto. He was known as a troublemaker in the 1820s and was notorious as a person who held changing political ideas, being easily swayed by public opinion and his friends.

On June 3, 1837, while commander of the Maipo regiment, he led a rebellion against the government of President José Joaquín Prieto and in opposition to Chilean participation in the War of the Confederation. On that day, he captured and imprisoned minister Diego Portales while he was reviewing troops at the army barracks in Quillota. Vidaurre immediately proceeded to attack Valparaíso on the mistaken belief that the public, opposed to the war, would support him and topple the government. He was defeated at the Battle of Barón on June 6, and subsequently had minister Portales assassinated by his guardians.

He was captured eight days later, court-martialed and sentenced to death. On 4 July 1837 he was publicly executed on Orrego square in Valparaiso, and his head was displayed on a pike at Quillota.
