= José Santiago Muñoz =

Chilean politician

José Santiago Muñoz Bezanilla (c. 1780 – 1836) was a Chilean soldier and politician.

Muñoz Bezanilla was born in Santiago and took part in the movement for independence from the very beginning. In 1811, he was one of the officers in charge of putting down the Figueroa mutiny, as aide-de-camp of the Grenadiers regiment. He participated in all the campaigns of the Patria Vieja (1811–1814), and after the defeat of Rancagua, he was left stranded between the Royalist armies. Captured by the Spanish authorities, he was exiled to the Juan Fernández Islands, where he remained imprisoned until after the victory of Maipu.

José Santiago Muñoz was an ardent Liberal and propagandist. He defended the liberal credo as a journalist for the El Pipiolo, El Tizón Republicano, El Monitor Araucano and El Canalla newspapers.

In 1824, Muñoz was elected a deputy for "San Carlos" (1824–1825), and in 1826 was reelected, this time for "Santiago" (1826–1827), being vice president of the chamber from January 8 to February 5, 1827. In 1828, he participated of the Constitutional Convention as a deputy for "Santa Bárbara de Casablanca" (1828–1829). During that period, President Francisco Ramón Vicuña appointed him as Secretary of War and Navy.

Muñoz fought in the Chilean Civil War of 1829, and after the final defeat of the Liberals at the Battle of Lircay, he was exiled to the town of Huasco in 1833, where he died at the age of 56.

Political offices
Preceded by José Manuel Borgoño	Minister of War and Navy; 1829	Succeeded by José Antonio Pérez-Cotapos
