= Ventura Blanco Encalada =

Chilean politician (1782–1856)

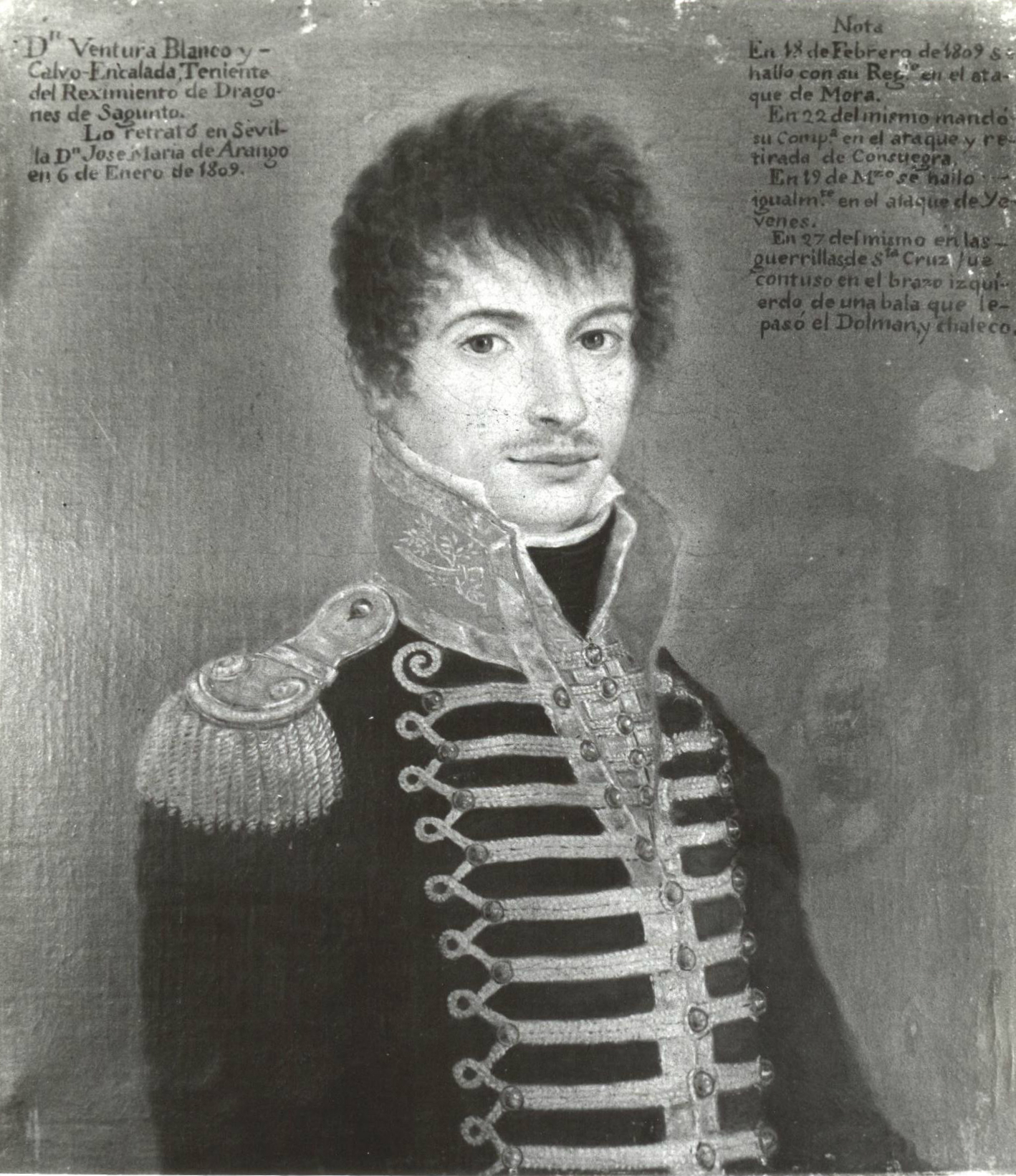
Ventura Blanco Encalada

Ventura Blanco y Calvo de Encalada (c. July 14, 1782 – June 13, 1856) was a Chilean political figure.

Blanco Encalada was born in Chuquisaca, Bolivia, the son of Manuel Lorenzo Blanco Cicerón and of Mercedes Calvo de Encalada y Recabarren (a Spanish father and a Chilean mother). He was trained for the Army in Spain, where he became a Guard de Corps and a lieutenant in the Regimiento de Dragones de Sangunto. During the Peninsular War, he supported Joseph Bonaparte and eventually was forced to emigrate to France. He returned to Buenos Aires in 1816, and moved to Chile in 1820, where his younger brother Manuel was an important political figure who went on to become its first President.

In 1826, President Ramón Freire named him Minister of Government and Foreign Affairs and in 1827, Vice President Francisco Antonio Pinto named him Secretary of Treasury. After the defeat of the liberals in the Chilean Civil War of 1829, he retired from politics. Blanco Encalada spent his last years teaching at the Universidad de Chile, where he became Dean of the School of Humanities. He was an Independent politician.

Political offices
Preceded by Joaquín Campino	Minister of Government and Foreign Affairs; 1826	Succeeded by Manuel José Gandarillas
Preceded by Melchor de Santiago Concha	Minister of Finance; 1827–1828	Succeeded by Francisco Ruiz-Tagle
