= Mariano Egaña =

Chilean lawyer and conservative politician

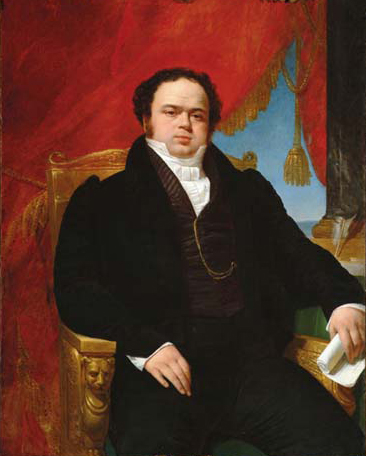
- Portrait of Mariano Egaña by Raymond Monvoisin

Dean of the Faculty of Law and Political Science of the University of Chile
- In office 21 July 1843 – 24 June 1846

Senator of Chile
- In office 1834 – 24 June 1846

Minister of Justice, Worship and Public Instruction
- In office 1837–1840
- President: Joaquín Prieto
- Preceded by: Diego Portales
- Succeeded by: Manuel Montt

Minister of Finance
- In office 1830–1830
- President: Francisco Ruiz-Tagle
- Preceded by: Pedro José Prado
- Succeeded by: Juan Francisco Meneses

Minister of the Interior and Foreign Affairs
- In office 1823–1824
- Leader: Ramón Freire
- Preceded by: Joaquín Echeverría
- Succeeded by: Francisco A. Pinto

Minister of War and Navy
- In office 1823–1823
- Leader: Ramón Freire
- Preceded by: Joaquín Echeverría

Personal details
- Born: 1793 Santiago, Captaincy General of Chile, Spanish Empire
- Died: June 24, 1846 (aged 52–53) Santiago, Chile
- Party: Conservative
- Spouse(s): María del Rosario Zuazagoitía; Carmen Zuazagoitía
- Children: 1
- Parent(s): Juan Egaña; Victoria Fabres
- Education: Real Universidad de San Felipe
- Occupation: Lawyer, politician, diplomat, academic
- Profession: Lawyer

Mariano Egaña Fabres (Note: In this Chilean name, the first or paternal surname is Egaña and the second or maternal family name is Fabres.) (1793–1846) was a Chilean lawyer, conservative politician and the main writer of the Chilean Constitution of 1833.

== Early life ==
Egaña was born in Santiago to Juan Egaña Risco, a jurist, politician, and writer, and Victoria Fabres González. He was the brother of parliamentarian Juan María Egaña Fabres.

He undertook higher education at the Real Universidad de San Felipe, earning a Bachelor of Philosophy and Laws in June 1809. He later completed his legal training through the Academy of Laws and Forensic Practice and qualified as a lawyer on 6 February 1811.

=== Exile ===
During the early independence period, Egaña joined the patriot cause and participated in the drafting and signing of the Provisional Constitutional Regulation of 1812. In 1813, he served as Secretary of the Interior in the Junta Representativa de la Soberanía and held various positions within successive governing juntas between 1813 and 1814.

Following the defeat of patriot forces at the Battle of Rancagua in 1814, Egaña was arrested together with his father and deported to the Juan Fernández Islands, where he remained until 1817. He returned to mainland Chile after the victory of Chacabuco.

== Public offices and diplomatic career ==
After his return, Egaña held several public offices, including secretary of the Intendancy, chief of police, interim prosecutor of the Court of Appeals, secretary of the Board of Economy and Arbitration, municipal councillor, and legal adviser to the Intendancy of Santiago.

In 1823, he was appointed Secretary of the Government Junta that replaced Bernardo O’Higgins following his abdication, and later served as Minister of Government and Foreign Affairs and Minister of the Navy on an interim basis. Between 1825 and 1829, Egaña served as Minister Plenipotentiary to several European governments, residing primarily in London and Paris. During this period, he played a key role in securing international recognition of Chile's independence and negotiating foreign loans to address the country’s postwar economic crisis.

== Constitutional work and political thought ==
While living in England, Egaña developed increasingly conservative political views, concluding that liberal democratic systems were ill-suited to the social and political conditions of the newly independent American republics. In correspondence sent from London in 1827, he expressed strong opposition to federalist reforms and advocated a strong, centralized executive authority combined with an independent judiciary and a public education system aimed at forming informed citizens.

After returning to Chile, Egaña aligned himself with the conservative faction and was elected to participate in the Great Constituent Convention of 1831–1833. He presented an alternative constitutional proposal known as the Voto Particular, which was more conservative than the draft prepared by the commission and the proposal advanced by Manuel José Gandarillas. Despite accusations of monarchism, Egaña exerted significant influence on the Convention and is considered one of the principal authors of the Constitution of 1833, which remained in force until 1925.

== Ministerial and parliamentary career ==
Egaña served in several ministerial roles during the governments of José Joaquín Prieto, Ramón Freire, Francisco Ruiz-Tagle, and Manuel Bulnes. His portfolios included Minister of Finance in 1830 and Minister of Justice, Worship and Public Instruction between 1837 and 1840. He also intermittently held the portfolio of the Interior and Foreign Affairs.

He was elected senator in 1831 and served continuously from 1834 until his death in 1846. During his parliamentary career, he participated in multiple standing committees and held leadership positions, including Vice President and President of the Senate. He also served as President of the Great Convention of 1831 and as Fiscal of the Supreme Court, a position he held for many years, exercising broad prosecutorial authority.

== Academic and legal work ==
In addition to his political activities, Egaña was a professor of Public International Law and Foreign Policy. On 21 July 1843, he became the first Dean of the Faculty of Law and Political Science of the University of Chile, a position he held until his death. He also authored and oversaw numerous decrees with the force of law, commonly known as the Leyes Marianas, which contributed to the development of Chilean procedural and administrative law.

== Personal life ==
Egaña married María del Rosario Zuazagoitía Astaburuaga in 1830, with whom he had a daughter, Margarita. After being widowed, he married her sister, Carmen Zuazagoitía Astaburuaga.

== Death ==
Mariano Egaña Fabres died suddenly in Santiago on 24 June 1846 at the age of 53.

== Legacy ==
Following his death, public honours were decreed in recognition of his service to the Republic. By law of 16 October 1846, the Chilean state acquired his personal library, which became the basis of a special collection within the National Library of Chile known as the Biblioteca Egaña.
