= Joaquín Tocornal =

Chilean politician

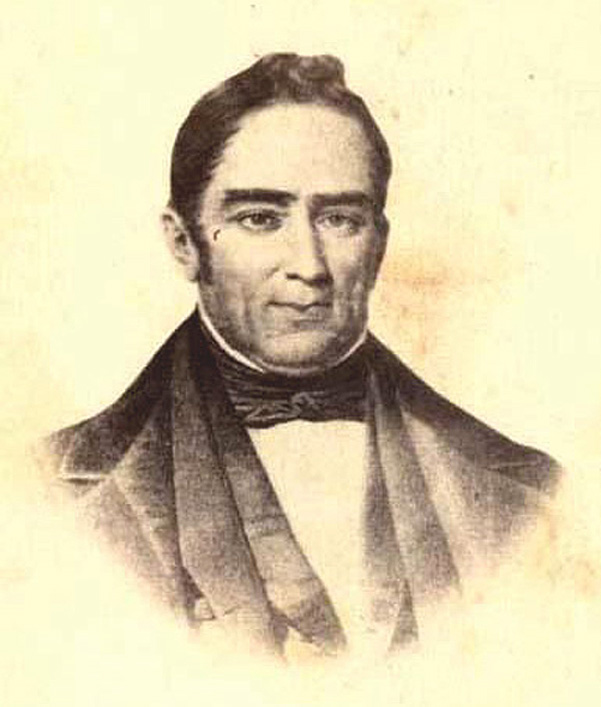
- Born: 1788; Santiago, Viceroyalty of Peru
- Died: 1865 (aged 76–77); Santiago, Chile

Joaquín Tocornal Jiménez (1788–1865) was a Chilean political figure. He served several times as minister, and participated actively in the war of independence in that country.

He was born in Santiago, Chile; the son of Juan Bonifacio de Tocornal and of Narcisa Jiménez Tordesillas; and was an active participant in the Chilean War of Independence, cooperating in the formation of the First Government Junta. He married Micaela Grez, and after her death, Delfina Jordán; with both wives he had descendants.

He was elected a deputy several times, the first time in 1823, always as a member of the conservatives. He was President of the constitutional assembly that approved the Constitution of 1833. With the support of Diego Portales, on May 17, 1832 he was named as Minister of the Interior and Foreign Affairs during the administration of President José Joaquín Prieto. He then became the head of the conservatives, and the fiercest critic of the filopolite group, which was under the leadership of the Finance Minister, Manuel Rengifo. The dispute was solved when Portales was named titular of all the ministries in the administration. He later returned to the government as Finance Minister. After Portales' murder, Tocornal managed to be appointed once more as Minister of the Interior and Foreign Affairs (concurrently) with his position as Finance Minister, thus becoming the most important minister in that administration.

After leaving the government, he participated actively in the creation of the Conservative Party. He also was elected to congress and served as a member until 1843. In 1841 was elected as Director of the Mint, position he held until his death. He died in Santiago, Chile in 1865.

== See also ==
- Media related to Joaquín Tocornal Jiménez at Wikimedia Commons

Political offices
Preceded by Diego Portales	Minister of the Interior and Foreign Affairs; 1837-1840	Succeeded by Manuel Montt
Preceded by Manuel Rengifo	Minister of Finance; 1835-1841	Succeeded by Rafael Correa de Saa
Preceded by Ramon Errazuriz	Minister of the Interior and Foreign Affairs; 1832-1835	Succeeded by Diego Portales
