= Ministry of Finance (Chile) =

Government ministry of Chile

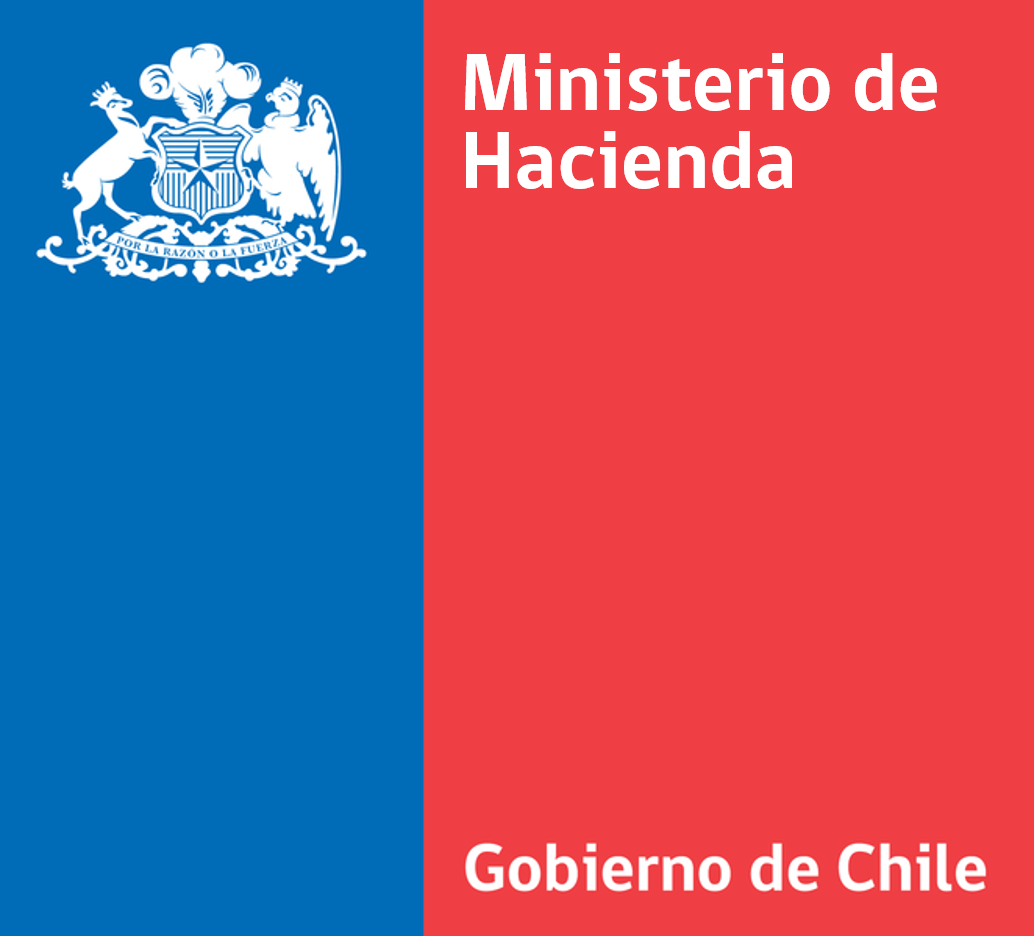

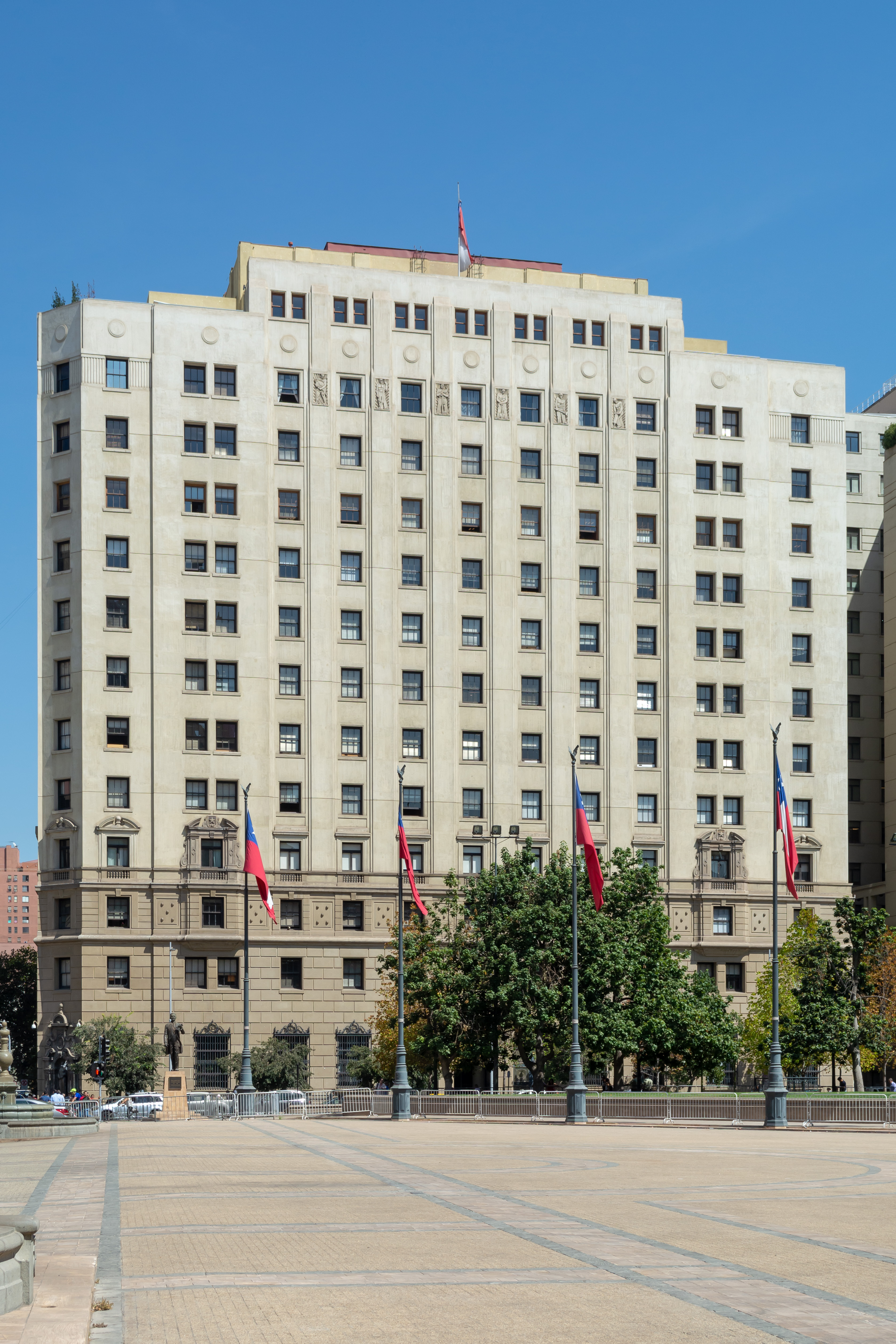
- Teatinos 120, Santiago

Ministry overview
- Formed: 1817
- Jurisdiction: Government of Chile
- Headquarters: Teatinos, Santiago
- Employees: 11,774 (2025)
- Annual budget: 784,274,970 CLP (2026)
- Ministers responsible: Jorge Quiroz, Minister of Finance; Sebastián Vallebona, Undersecretary of Finance
- Child agencies: Tesorería General de la República; Defensoría Nacional del Contribuyente; Servicio de Impuestos Internos; Unidad de Análisis Financiero; Dirección de Presupuestos; Dirección de Compras y Contratación Pública; Servicio Nacional de Aduanas; Comisión para el Mercado Financiero; Dirección Nacional del Servicio Civil; Superintendencia de Casinos de Juego
- Website: https://www.hacienda.cl

The Ministry of Finance (Spanish: Ministerio de Hacienda) is the cabinet-level administrative office in charge of managing the financial affairs, fiscal policy, and capital markets of Chile; planning, directing, coordinating, executing, controlling and informing all financial policies formulated by the President of Chile.

Since 11 March 2026, the Minister of Finance is Jorge Quiroz. Since 10 August 2026, the Undersecretary of Finance is Sebastián Vallebona.

== History ==
In 1814 the Secretary of Finance was created, as Supreme Director Bernardo O'Higgins sought to develop an administrative framework for the then newly formed nation, considering the need to ascertain its independence from the Spanish crown. The office was first organized by a Presidential Decree on 2 June 1817, and was named "Secretariat of Finance" (1818 - 1824). Hipólito de Villegas was appointed to lead the new institution. The present structure, duties and attributions were defined by Presidential Decree N° 7912, "General Law of Ministries", on 30 November 1927.

== Institutional framework ==
According to Article 6 of Decree 7,912 of 1927, the Ministry of Finance responsibilities include, among others:

- Management of State's financial policy
- Collection and administration of public revenue
- Public accounting
- Study of custom policy and intervention in trade agreements
- Issues concerning monetary laws, banks and credit institutions
- Issues concerning corporation oversight, stock exchange and insurance
- Everything related to public credit and the presentation in Congress of projects affecting public finance
- The development and technical study of the Budget of the Nation and investment account

In practice, the Ministry of Finance executes policies through several related and dependent institutions.

Related Institutions:

- BancoEstado
- Government Procurement Directorate
- Civil Service Directorate
- National Customs Service
- Internal Tax Service
- Public Purchasing and Recruiting Department
- Superintendency of Banks and Financial Institutions
- Superintendency of Securities and Insurance
- Superintendency of Game Casinos
- Financial Analysis Unit

Dependent Institutions:

- Budget Office
- General Treasury of the Republic

== Policies ==
One of Chile's fiscal policy central features has been its counter-cyclical nature. This has been facilitated by the voluntary application since 2001 of a structural balance policy based on the commitment to an announced goal of a medium-term structural balance as a percentage of GDP. The structural balance nets out the effect of the economic cycle (including copper price volatility) on fiscal revenues and constrains expenditures to a correspondingly consistent level. In practice, this means that expenditures rise when economic activity is low and decrease in booms. The target was of 1% of GDP between 2001 and 2007, it was reduced to 0.5% in 2008 and then to 0% in 2009 due to the Great Recession In 2005, key elements of this voluntary policy were incorporated into legislation through the Fiscal Responsibility Law (Law 20,128).

However, the 2008 financial crisis together with the reconstruction following the 2010 Chile earthquake undermined the financial position of the country, resulting in a structural deficit that was reduced to 1/2 percent of GDP in 2012, two years ahead of government expectations to pass the 1% threshold. The 2013 budget was devised with a target structural deficit of 1%.

The Fiscal Responsibility Law also allowed for the creation of two sovereign wealth funds: the Pension Reserve Fund (PRF) and the Economic and Social Stabilization Fund (ESSF). The PRF was created as a response to the expected increase in liabilities related to old-age pensions and benefits, especially for the poor, and it had accumulated US$5.883 million (market value) by the end of 2012. The PRF is set to receive yearly capital injections between 0.2% and 0.5% of the previous year's GDP depending on the fiscal surplus, so new resources are secured every year. The ESSF's objective is to stabilize fiscal spending by providing funds to finance fiscal deficits and debt amortization and had market value of US$14.998 million by the end of year 2012. Each year, the ESSF accumulates any fiscal surplus remaining after the contributions to the FRP and to the capital of the Central Bank of Chile, excluding debt service and anticipatory contributions during the previous year. The funds are managed by the Central Bank of Chile and a Financial Committee advises on their investment policy. Chile also participated in the discussion and agreed to the Santiago Principles.

The main taxes in Chile in terms of revenue collection are the value added tax (45.8% of total revenues in 2012) and the income tax (41.8% of total revenues in 2012). The value added tax is levied on sales of goods and services (including imports) at a rate of 19%, with a few exemptions. The income tax revenue comprises different taxes. While there is a corporate income tax of 20% over profits from companies (called First Category Tax), the system is ultimately designed to tax individuals. Therefore, corporate income taxes paid constitute a credit towards two personal income taxes: the Global Complementary Tax (in the case of residents) or the Additional Tax (in the case of non-residents). The Global Complementary Tax is payable by those that have different sources of income, while those receiving income solely from dependent work are subject to the Second Category Tax. Both taxes are equally progressive in statutory terms, with a top marginal rate of 40%. Income arising from corporate activity under the Global Complementary Tax only becomes payable when effectively distributed to the individual. There are also special sales taxes on alcohol and luxury goods, as well as specific taxes on tobacco and fuel. Other taxes include the inheritance tax and custom duties.

In 2012, general government expenditure reached 21.5% of GDP, while revenues were equivalent to 22% of GDP. Gross financial debt amounted to 12.2% of GDP, while in net terms it was of -6.9% of GDP, both well below OECD averages.

Chile's prudent fiscal policy along with low debt levels have been cited as contributing factors to Chile's exceptionally high credit rating in the context of the region. Chile's AA− S&P rating is the highest in the Latin America, while Fitch Ratings places the country one step below, in A+.

== List of ministers of finance ==
=== Patria Vieja period ===
Picture	Name	Entered office	Exited office	Notes	Appointed by
	José María Villarreal	14 March 1814	23 July 1814	Secretary of Government	Francisco de la Lastra
	Bernardo de Vera y Pintado	23 July 1814	10 August 1814	Secretary of Government and Finance	Government Junta
	Manuel Rodríguez Erdoyza	10 August 1814	2 October 1814	Secretary of Government and Finance	Government Junta

=== Ministers of finance ===
Picture	Name	Entered office	Exited office	Notes	Appointed by
	Hipólito de Villegas y Fernández	7 September 1817	30 March 1818		Bernardo O'Higgins
	Anselmo de la Cruz y Bahamonde	30 March 1818	14 April 1818		Bernardo O'Higgins
	José Miguel Infante y Rojas	14 April 1818	27 June 1818		Bernardo O'Higgins
	Anselmo de la Cruz y Bahamonde	27 June 1818	2 May 1820		Bernardo O'Higgins
	José Antonio Rodríguez Aldea	2 May 1820	28 January 1823		Bernardo O'Higgins
	Agustín Vial Santelices	28 January 1823	8 April 1823		Government Junta
	Pedro Nolasco Mena y Ramírez Rivilla	8 April 1823	12 July 1823		Ramón Freire
	Diego José Benavente Bustamante	12 July 1823	22 February 1825		Ramón Freire
	José Ignacio Eyzaguirre Arechavala	22 February 1825	18 June 1825		Ramón Freire
	Rafael Correa de Saa Lazón	18 June 1825	8 October 1825		Ramón Freire
	Diego José Benavente Bustamante	8 October 1825	17 October 1825		Ramón Freire
	Manuel José Gandarillas Guzmán	17 October 1825	9 September 1826		Ramón Freire
	Agustín Vial Santelices	12 September 1826	20 October 1826		Agustín Eyzaguirre
	Melchor de Santiago-Concha y Cerda	20 October 1826	22 October 1826		Agustín Eyzaguirre
	Ventura Blanco Encalada	8 March 1827	23 July 1828	Reappointed	Ramón Freire
	Francisco Ruiz-Tagle Portales	23 July 1828	16 July 1829		Francisco Antonio Pinto
	Manuel José Huici	16 July 1829	9 November 1829		Francisco Ramón Vicuña
	Pedro José Prado Montaner	9 November 1829	7 December 1829		Francisco Ramón Vicuña
	Mariano Egaña Fabres	20 February 1830	18 March 1830		Francisco Ruiz-Tagle
	Juan Francisco Meneses Echanes	18 March 1830	15 June 1830		Francisco Ruiz-Tagle
	Manuel Rengifo Cárdenas	15 June 1830	9 November 1835		José Tomás Ovalle
	Joaquín Tocornal Jiménez	9 November 1835	14 April 1841		José Joaquín Prieto
	Rafael Correa de Saa	14 April 1841	18 September 1841		José Joaquín Prieto
	Manuel Rengifo Cárdenas	18 September 1841	10 April 1845		Manuel Bulnes
	José Joaquín Pérez Mascayano	10 April 1845	22 September 1846		Manuel Bulnes
	Manuel Camilo Vial Formas	22 September 1846	9 May 1848	Interim	Manuel Bulnes
	Salvador Sanfuentes Torres	9 May 1848	12 June 1849	Interim	Manuel Bulnes
	Antonio García Reyes	12 June 1849	19 April 1850		Manuel Bulnes
	Jerónimo Urmeneta García-Abello	19 April 1850	7 May 1852	Appointed by	Manuel Bulnes
	Jerónimo Urmeneta García-Abello	19 April 1850	7 May 1852	Reappointed by	Manuel Montt
	Guillermo Waddington	7 May 1852	7 January 1854		Manuel Montt
	José María Berganza Lorca	7 January 1854	18 September 1856	Interim	Manuel Montt
	José Francisco Gana López	18 September 1856	31 October 1856	Interim	Manuel Montt
	Alejandro Vial Guzmán	31 October 1856	29 September 1857		Manuel Montt
	Francisco de Borja Solar Gorostiaga	29 September 1857	8 January 1858		Manuel Montt
	Matías Ovalle Errázuriz	8 January 1858	3 October 1859		Manuel Montt
	Jovino Novoa Vidal	3 October 1859	1 October 1861		Manuel Montt
	Manuel Rengifo Vial	1 October 1861	9 July 1862		José Joaquín Pérez
	José Victorino Lastarria Santander	9 July 1862	16 January 1863		José Joaquín Pérez
	Domingo Santa María	16 January 1863	10 May 1864		José Joaquín Pérez
	Alejandro Reyes	10 May 1864	7 January 1869		José Joaquín Pérez
	Melchor de Concha y Toro	7 January 1869	2 August 1870		José Joaquín Pérez
	José A. Gandarillas	2 August 1870	18 September 1871		José Joaquín Pérez
	Camilo Cobo	18 September 1871	12 April 1872		Federico Errázuriz Zañartu
	Ramón Barros Luco	12 April 1872	18 September 1876		Federico Errázuriz Zañartu
	Rafael Sotomayor	18 September 1876	27 October 1877		Aníbal Pinto
	Augusto Matte	27 October 1877	5 August 1878		Aníbal Pinto
	Julio Zegers	5 August 1878	17 April 1879		Aníbal Pinto
	Augusto Matte	17 April 1879	16 June 1880		Aníbal Pinto
	José Alfonso Cavada	16 June 1880	18 September 1881		Aníbal Pinto
	Luis Aldunate Carrera	18 September 1881	25 April 1882		Domingo Santa María
	Pedro Lucio Cuadra	25 April 1882	18 January 1884		Domingo Santa María
	Ramón Barros Luco	18 January 1884	5 September 1885		Domingo Santa María
	Pedro Gandarillas	5 September 1885	13 October 1885		Domingo Santa María
	Hermógenes Pérez de Arce Lopetegui	13 October 1885	18 September 1886		Domingo Santa María
	Agustín Edwards Ross	18 September 1886	13 April 1888		José Manuel Balmaceda
	Enrique Sanfuentes	13 April 1888	2 November 1888		José Manuel Balmaceda
	Justiniano Sotomayor Guzmán	2 November 1888	11 June 1889		José Manuel Balmaceda
	Juan de Dios Vial Guzmán	11 June 1889	23 October 1889		José Manuel Balmaceda
	Pedro Montt Montt	23 October 1889	21 January 1890		José Manuel Balmaceda
	Pedro Gandarillas	21 January 1890	7 August 1890		José Manuel Balmaceda
	Manuel Fernández Pradel	7 August 1890	15 October 1890		José Manuel Balmaceda
	Lauro Barros	15 October 1890	26 December 1890		José Manuel Balmaceda
	Anfión Muñoz	26 December 1890	5 January 1891		José Manuel Balmaceda
	Ismael Pérez Montt	27 December 1890	5 January 1891	Interim	José Manuel Balmaceda
	José Miguel Valdés	5 January 1891	29 March 1891		José Manuel Balmaceda
	Arístides Zañartu	29 March 1891	29 July 1891		José Manuel Balmaceda
	Manuel J. Yrarrázaval	29 July 1891	29 August 1891		José Manuel Balmaceda
	Joaquín Walker Martínez	7 September 1891	26 December 1891		Revolutionary Junta of Iquique
	Francisco Valdés	26 December 1891	14 March 1892		Jorge Montt
	Agustin Edwards Ross	14 March 1892	9 July 1892		Jorge Montt
	Enrique Mac Iver	9 July 1892	22 April 1893		Jorge Montt
	Alejandro Vial	22 April 1893	26 April 1894		Jorge Montt
	Carlos Riesco Errázuriz	26 April 1894	7 December 1894		Jorge Montt
	Manuel Fernández Pradel	7 December 1894	1 August 1895		Jorge Montt
	Enrique Mac Iver	1 August 1895	24 November 1895		Jorge Montt
	Hermógenes Pérez de Arce Lopetegui	24 November 1895	18 September 1896		Jorge Montt
	José Francisco Fabres	18 September 1896	20 November 1896		Federico Errázuriz Echaurren
	Justiniano Sotomayor Guzmán	20 November 1896	26 June 1897		Federico Errázuriz Echaurren
	Juan E. Tocornal	26 June 1897	25 August 1897		Federico Errázuriz Echaurren
	Elías Fernández	25 August 1897	23 December 1897		Federico Errázuriz Echaurren
	Alberto González Errázuriz	23 December 1897	14 April 1898		Federico Errázuriz Echaurren
	Darío Zañartu	14 April 1898	28 June 1898		Federico Errázuriz Echaurren
	Rafael Sotomayor Gaete	28 June 1898	27 June 1899		Federico Errázuriz Echaurren
	Manuel Salinas González	27 June 1899	14 October 1900		Federico Errázuriz Echaurren
	Ramón Santelices Cuevas	14 October 1900	3 November 1900		Federico Errázuriz Echaurren
	Nicolás González Errázuriz	3 November 1900	15 March 1901		Federico Errázuriz Echaurren
	Manuel Fernández García	15 March 1901	1 May 1901		Federico Errázuriz Echaurren
	Juan Luis Sanfuentes Andonaegui	1 May 1901	3 October 1901		Federico Errázuriz Echaurren
	Luis Barros Borgoño	3 October 1901	18 November 1901		Germán Riesco
	Enrique Villegas Encalada	18 November 1901	6 May 1902		Germán Riesco
	Guillermo Barros	6 May 1902	20 November 1902		Germán Riesco
	Ricardo Cruzat	20 November 1902	7 April 1903		Germán Riesco
	Manuel Salinas	7 April 1903	1 September 1903		Germán Riesco
	Miguel Cruchaga Tocornal	1 September 1903	10 January 1904		Germán Riesco
	Ramón Santelices Cuevas	10 January 1904	12 April 1904		Germán Riesco
	Guillermo Barros	12 April 1904	12 May 1904		Germán Riesco
	Maximiliano Ibáñez	12 May 1904	30 October 1904		Germán Riesco
	Ernesto Hübner Bermúdez	30 October 1904	18 March 1905		Germán Riesco
	Antonio Subercaseaux	18 March 1905	21 October 1905		Germán Riesco
	Belfor Fernández	21 October 1905	19 March 1906		Germán Riesco
	Ramón Santelices	19 March 1906	7 May 1906		Germán Riesco
	Joaquín Prieto Hurtado	7 May 1906	18 September 1906		Germán Riesco
	José del Río	18 September 1906	29 October 1906		Pedro Montt
	Rafael Sotomayor Gaete	29 October 1906	12 June 1907		Pedro Montt
	Guillermo Subercaseaux Pérez	12 June 1907	25 October 1907		Pedro Montt
	Enrique Rodríguez	25 October 1907	29 August 1908		Pedro Montt
	Pedro Montenegro Onel	29 August 1908	22 January 1909		Pedro Montt
	Luis Devoto	22 January 1909	15 June 1909		Pedro Montt
	Joaquín Figueroa	15 June 1909	15 September 1909		Pedro Montt
	Manuel Salinas	15 September 1909	25 June 1910		Pedro Montt
	Carlos Balmaceda	25 June 1910	23 December 1910		Pedro Montt
	José del Río	23 December 1910	11 January 1911		Ramón Barros Luco
	Roberto Sánchez García de la Huerta	11 April 1911	15 August 1911		Ramón Barros Luco
	Pedro Montenegro Onel	15 August 1911	20 May 1912		Ramón Barros Luco
	Samuel Claro Lastarria	20 May 1912	8 August 1912		Ramón Barros Luco
	Manuel Rivas Vicuña	8 August 1912	8 April 1913		Ramón Barros Luco
	Pedro García de la Huerta Izquierdo	8 August 1913	16 June 1913		Ramón Barros Luco
	Arturo Alessandri	16 June 1913	17 November 1913		Ramón Barros Luco
	Ricardo Salas Edwards	17 November 1913	3 September 1914		Ramón Barros Luco
	Alfredo Barros	3 September 1914	6 September 1914		Ramón Barros Luco
	Enrique Oyarzún	6 September 1914	15 September 1914		Ramón Barros Luco
	Alberto Edwards Argandoña	15 September 1914	15 December 1915		Ramón Barros Luco
	Manuel García de la Huerta	15 December 1915	23 December 1915		Ramón Barros Luco
	Ramón Santelices	23 December 1915	8 January 1916	PC	Juan Luis Sanfuentes
	Armando Quezada	8 January 1916	1 July 1916	PR	Juan Luis Sanfuentes
	Luis Devoto	1 July 1916	20 November 1916	PLD	Juan Luis Sanfuentes
	Arturo Prat Carvajal	20 November 1916	14 July 1917	PN	Juan Luis Sanfuentes
	Armando Quezada	14 July 1917	12 October 1917	PR	Juan Luis Sanfuentes
	Ricardo Salas Edwards	12 October 1917	18 January 1918	PC	Juan Luis Sanfuentes
	Manuel Hederra	18 January 1918	27 April 1918	PN	Juan Luis Sanfuentes
	Luis Claro Solar	27 April 1918	6 September 1918	PL	Juan Luis Sanfuentes
	Luis Aníbal Barrios	6 September 1918	25 November 1918	PR	Juan Luis Sanfuentes
	Luis Claro Solar	25 November 1918	9 July 1919	PL	Juan Luis Sanfuentes
	Julio Philippi Bihl	9 July 1919	8 November 1919	PL	Juan Luis Sanfuentes
	Guillermo Subercaseaux	8 November 1919	26 March 1920	PNa	Juan Luis Sanfuentes
	Enrique Oyarzún	26 March 1920	16 June 1920	PR	Juan Luis Sanfuentes
	Antonio Viera Gallo	16 June 1920	1 July 1920	PN	Juan Luis Sanfuentes
	Francisco Garcés Gana	1 July 1920	23 December 1920	PL	Juan Luis Sanfuentes
	Daniel Martner	23 December 1920	12 May 1921	PR	Arturo Alessandri
	Enrique Oyarzún	12 May 1921	16 August 1921	PR	Arturo Alessandri
	Víctor R. Celis	16 August 1921	3 November 1921	PR	Arturo Alessandri
	Francisco Garcés Gana	3 November 1921	22 March 1922	PL	Arturo Alessandri
	Galvarino Gallardo	22 March 1922	1 April 1922	PR	Arturo Alessandri
	Samuel Claro	1 April 1922	29 August 1922	PL	Arturo Alessandri
	Guillermo Edwards Matte	29 August 1922	21 December 1922	PL	Arturo Alessandri
	Ricardo Valdés Bustamante	21 December 1922	12 January 1923	PL	Arturo Alessandri
	Aníbal Rodríguez	12 January 1923	16 March 1923	PN	Arturo Alessandri
	Víctor R. Celis	16 March 1923	14 June 1923	PR	Arturo Alessandri
	Agustín Correa Bravo	14 June 1923	2 July 1923	PLD	Arturo Alessandri
	Guillermo Subercaseaux Pérez	2 July 1923	3 January 1924	PN	Arturo Alessandri
	Enrique Zañartu Prieto	3 January 1924	1 February 1924	PLD	Arturo Alessandri
	Samuel Claro Lastarria	1 February 1924	14 March 1924	PL	Arturo Alessandri
	Belfor Fernández Rodríguez	14 March 1924	20 July 1924	PLD	Arturo Alessandri
	Enrique Zañartu Prieto	20 July 1924	5 September 1924	PLD	Arturo Alessandri
	Jorge Quiroz	11 March 2026	Incumbent	Ind.	José Antonio Kast

- PAL - Partido Agrario Laborista
- PC - Partido Conservador
- PCCh - Partido Comunista de Chile
- PCSC - Partido Conservador Social Cristiano
- PCU - Partido Conservador Unido
- PDC - Partido Democrata Cristiano
- Ind - Independiente
- PL - Partido Liberal
- PLD - Partido Liberal Democrático
- MAPU - Movimiento de Acción Popular Unitaria
- PN - Partido Nacional
- PNa - Partido Unión Nacionalista
- PR - Partido Radical
- PRDe - Partido Radical Democrático
- PS - Partido Socialista

== Sources ==
- República de Chile (1942). "VI. Poder Ejecutivo - Nómina de Gobernantes, Presidentes y Ministros desde la Independencia.". Manual del Senado. 1810-1942 (PDF) (in Spanish). Santiago de Chile: Imprenta Universitaria.
- Valencia Avaria, Luis (1986). Anales de la República: textos constitucionales de Chile y registro de los ciudadanos que han integrado los poderes ejecutivo y legislativo desde 1810 (in Spanish) (2ª edición ed.). Santiago de Chile: Editorial Andrés Bello.
