= Vice President of Chile =

Acting head of state and of government post in Chile's constitution

Vice President of the Republic of Chile
- Vicepresidente de la República de Chile
- Coat of arms of Chile
- Executive branch in Chilean Politics
- Status: Acting Head of State; Acting Head of Government
- Member of: Government
- Term length: Situational
- Constituting instrument: Constitution of Chile

The Vice President of Chile, officially known as the Vice President of the Republic (Spanish: Vicepresidente de la República), is a temporary post provided by the Constitution of Chile. The "vice president" is a person who fulfills the duties of the President of Chile when cases of incapacity and vacancy occur. However, the consent of the Senate is required for the "vice president" to exercise the duties of the president. This post is held by the Minister of the Interior and Public Security or by the next minister of the government, in the order of succession, in case of the former's absence.

It was originally a permanent political position in Chile from 1826 to 1833.

In 1826, jointly with the establishment of the title of President of the Republic, the position of Vice President was created, whose function was to replace the President in the cases of illness, absence and others. Agustín Eyzaguirre was elected as the first vice president in the election of 1826. Francisco Antonio Pinto was designated in the position in the election of following year.

The Constitution of 1828, the only Chilean constitution that established the vicepresidency as a permanent position, provided that in case of death or physical or moral impossibility of the president, he would replace him in his post. The required qualities were the same as those required from president. The appointment of Joaquín Vicuña as vice president, after the election of 1829, the first under the rule of the Charter of 1828, was the object of a great controversy and is considered one of the triggers of the Revolution of 1829. The permanent position of vice president was abolished with the 1833 Constitution, Diego Portales being the last to occupy it.

Since then, the title of "Vice President" is only used for the first individual in the order of succession to discharge the duties of the president in case of temporary impediment or vacancy. The "Vice President", in the performance of their duties, has all the powers that the Constitution confers on the President.

== Vice Presidents ==
| No. | Portrait | Name (birth–death) | Term of office | | | Party | President | Notes |
| No. | Portrait | Name (birth–death) | Took office | Left office | Time in office | Party | President | Notes |
|---|---|---|---|---|---|---|---|---|
| 1 | | Agustín Eyzaguirre (1768–1837) | 9 July 1826 | 9 September 1826 | 62 days | Independent | Manuel Blanco Encalada | Succeeded to the presidency |
| 2 | | Francisco Antonio Pinto (1785–1858) | 15 February 1827 | 8 May 1827 | 82 days | Pipiolos | Ramón Freire | Succeeded to the presidency |
| 3 | | Joaquín Vicuña (1786–1857) | 19 October 1829 | 2 November 1829 | 14 days | Pipiolos | Francisco Antonio Pinto | |
| 4 | | José Tomás Ovalle (1787–1831) | 18 February 1830 | 1 April 1830 | 42 days | Pelucones | Francisco Ruiz-Tagle | Succeeded to the presidency |
| 5 | | Diego Portales (1793–1837) | 18 September 1831 | 26 May 1833 | 1 year, 281 days | Pelucones | José Joaquín Prieto | Never took oath of office |
