= Guillermo Waddington =

Chilean politician

Guillermo Waddington (died June 1883) was a Chilean politician. He served in the Chamber of Deputies of Chile, and as minister of finance of Chile.
