= Francisco Ruiz-Tagle =

Chilean political figure

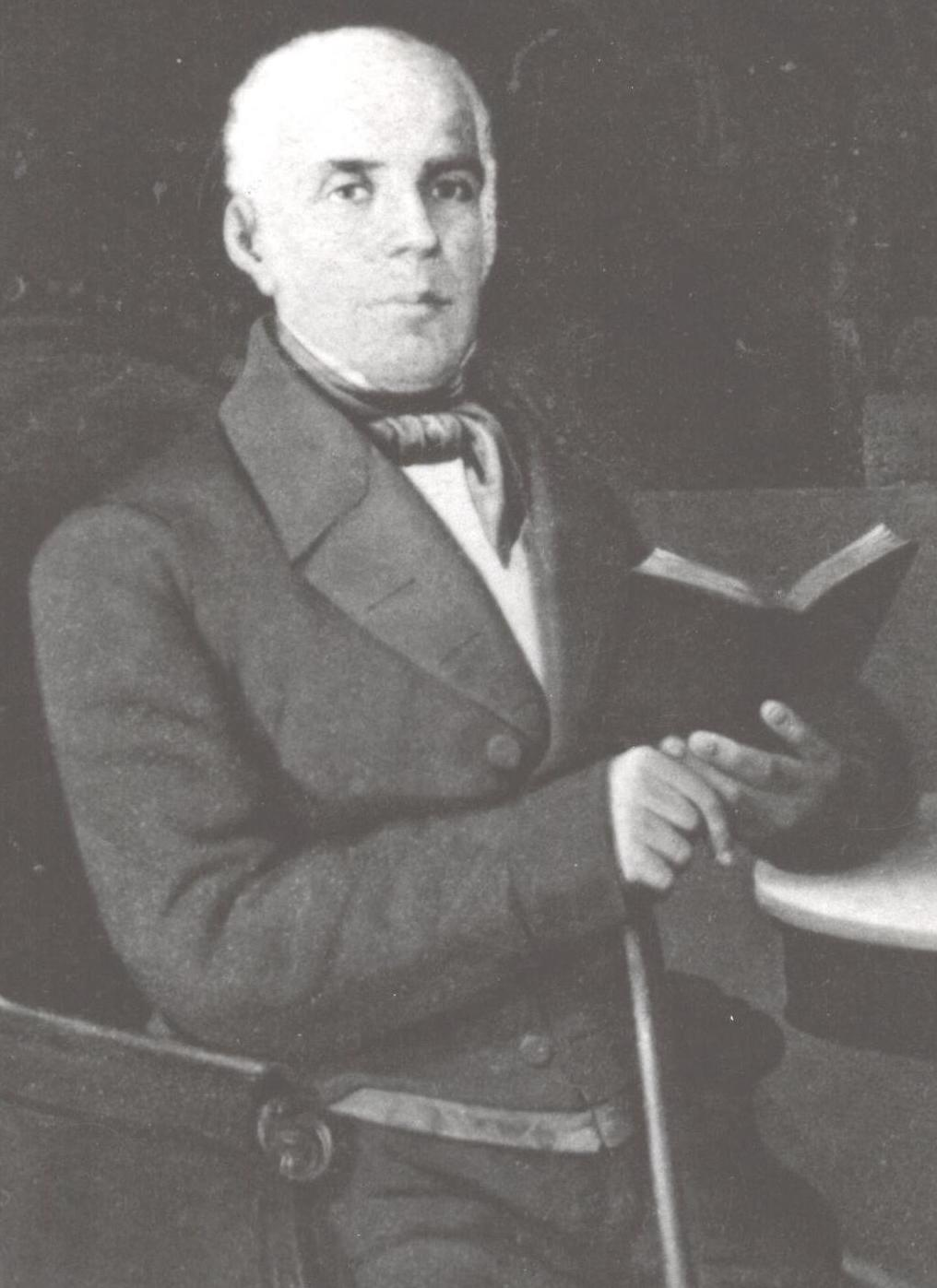

Provisional President of Chile
- In office February 17, 1830 – March 31, 1830
- Vice President: José Tomás Ovalle
- Preceded by: José Tomás Ovalle
- Succeeded by: José Tomás Ovalle

Personal details
- Born: 1790 Santiago, Chile
- Died: March 23, 1860 Santiago, Chile
- Party: Conservative
- Spouse: Rosario Larraín

Francisco Antonio Pascual de la Ascensión Ruiz de Tagle y Portales (Latin American Spanish: [fɾanˈsisko ˌrwisˈtaɣle]; c. 1790 – March 23, 1860) was a Chilean political figure. In 1830, he was briefly Provisional President of the Republic of Chile, elected by Congress.

== Biography ==
He was born in Santiago; the son of Manuel Ruiz de Tagle y Jaraquemada and María del Rosario Portales Larraín. In his youth and according to the social norms of the time, he also became a militia officer in the "Regimiento del Principe" (Prince's regiment). He married Rosario Larraín Rojas and had nine children.

The son of a royalist family, he was a tepid participant in the Chilean War of Independence, especially during the period of the first government juntas. After the Battle of Maipu, he became an ardent independentist and joined the Conservative party. Beginning in 1811, he represented Los Andes in parliament. From 1812 to 1814, he served as senator and president of parliament, and in 1814, he became councilman and mayor of the municipality of Santiago and became the provincial governor on February 13, 1817. He was a deputy of the Government Junta. In 1822, he became superintendent of police of Santiago. He was Finance Minister under Vice President Francisco Antonio Pinto from July 28, 1828, to July 16, 1829.

In the course of events leading to the Chilean Civil War of 1829, he was part of the Government Junta. The junta nominated him as candidate for the following presidential election and Congress elected him as Provisional President on February 17, 1830, by imposition of José Antonio Rodríguez Aldea, head of the O'Higgins party. Immediately after Ruiz-Tagle took over as president, the principal leaders of the liberal side (Manuel Borgoño, Francisco de la Lastra and Juan Gregorio de las Heras) were eliminated from the army rosters. This guaranteed the restart of the hostilities.

Diego Portales, cousin to Ruiz-Tagle, maneuvered to have the president removed. President Ruiz-Tagle and all of the cabinet resigned only six weeks later on March 31, claiming health problems, and Vice President of Chile José Tomás Ovalle assumed power on April 1. Under the administration of Manuel Bulnes, Ruiz-Tagle was nominated to the privy council. He died on the Chacra Lo Matta of Las Condes on March 23, 1860.

== Cabinet ==
The Ruiz-Tagle Cabinet
Office	Name	Term
President	Francisco Ruiz-Tagle	17 February 1830–31 March 1830
Minister of the Interior & Foreign Affairs	Pbtro. Juan Francisco Meneses	20 February 1830–5 April 1830
Minister of War & Navy	José María Benavente	20 February 1830–5 April 1830
Minister of Finance	Mariano Egaña	20 February 1830–18 March 1830
Pbtro. Juan Francisco Meneses	18 March 1830–15 June 1830

Political offices
Preceded by Ventura Blanco Encalada	Minister of Finance; 1828 - 1829	Succeeded by Manuel José Huici
Preceded by José Tomás Ovalle	Provisional President of Chile; 1830	Succeeded by José Tomás Ovalle
