= Ricardo Cruzat =

Chilean politician (1845–1905)

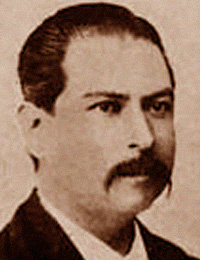

Minister of Finance
- In office 20 November 1902 – 4 April 1903
- President: Germán Riesco

Minister of Foreign Affairs and Worship
- In office 12 March 1891 – 20 May 1891
- President: José Manuel Balmaceda

Member of the Chamber of Deputies
- In office 1894–1897
- Constituency: Illapel, Ovalle and Combarbalá
- In office 15 April 1891 – 18 August 1891
- Constituency: Cachapoal

Personal details
- Born: 18 October 1845 Santiago, Chile
- Died: 7 January 1905 (aged 59)
- Party: Liberal Democratic Party
- Spouse: Amelia Vicuña Rozas
- Children: 6
- Parent(s): Pedro Nolasco Cruzat Carrera; Carmen Hurtado Ugarte
- Education: University of Chile (LL.B)
- Profession: Lawyer, farmer

Ricardo Cruzat Hurtado (18 October 1845 – 7 January 1905) was a Chilean lawyer, farmer and politician who served as a member of the Chamber of Deputies of Chile and as a minister of state under presidents José Manuel Balmaceda and Germán Riesco.

A member of the Liberal Democratic Party, he represented Cachapoal in the Constituent Congress of 1891 and Illapel, Ovalle and Combarbalá from 1894 to 1897.

== Early life ==
Cruzat was born in Santiago on 18 October 1845 to Pedro Nolasco Cruzat Carrera and Carmen Hurtado Ugarte. He studied law at the University of Chile and qualified as a lawyer on 1 May 1868.

On 26 September 1876, he married Amelia Vicuña Rozas in Santiago, with whom he had six children, including politician Manuel Cruzat Vicuña.

Cruzat practiced law and was also involved in agriculture. In 1884, he was listed among the largest taxpayers in Santiago. He later became a director of the Compañía de Salitres de Antofagasta in 1902.

== Political career ==
Cruzat served as Minister of Foreign Affairs and Worship under President José Manuel Balmaceda, taking office on 12 March 1891.

During the Chilean Civil War of 1891, he represented Cachapoal in the Constituent Congress convened by Balmaceda, serving as a deputy from 15 April to 18 August 1891.

Following the civil war, Cruzat became a member of the Liberal Democratic Party and participated in the reorganization of the party.

He returned to the Chamber of Deputies after being elected for Illapel, Ovalle and Combarbalá for the 1894–1897 legislative term.

During the presidency of Germán Riesco, Cruzat was appointed Minister of Finance on 20 November 1902. He remained in office until 4 April 1903.

Cruzat died on 7 January 1905.
