= Battle of Ochagavía =

- Part of Chilean Civil War of 1829–1830
Date	14 December 1829
Location	Chacra Ochagavía , current commune of Pedro Aguirre Cerda, Chile 33°29′31.4″S 70°40′03.3″W
Result	Pelucones Victory: Establishment of the Government Junta of Chile
Territorial changes	Pipiolos withdraw from Ochagavía

Belligerents
(Chile) Pelucones (Conservatives)	(Chile) Pipiolos (Liberals)

Commanders and leaders
Joaquín Prieto Vial	Francisco de la Lastra

Strength
Unknown	Unknown

Battle of Ochagavía was the first battle of the Chilean Civil War of 1829-1830 between the forces of Pipiolos (liberals), led by Francisco de la Lastra y de la Sotta and Pelucones (conservatives) led by Joaquín Prieto Vial. Francisco de la Lastra's forces have been defeated in the battle.
