= Manuel Rengifo =

Chilean politician

Manuel Rengifo Cardenas
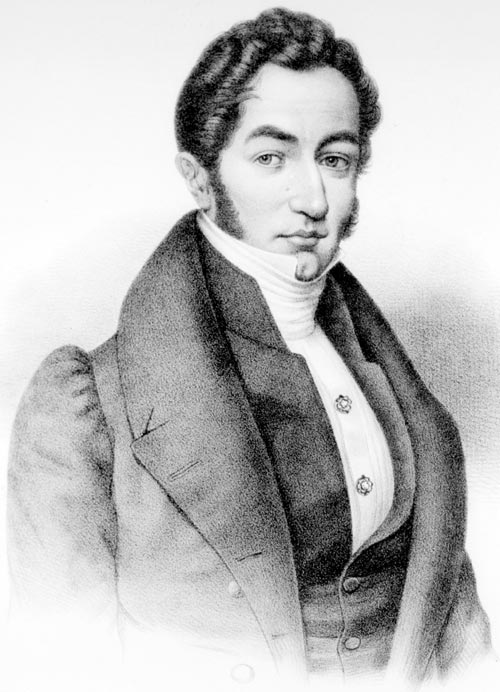
- Born: December 31, 1793; Santiago, Viceroyalty of Peru
- Died: March 16, 1845 (aged 51); Talca, Chile

Manuel Rengifo Cardenas (December 31, 1793 – March 16, 1845) was a Chilean politician. He was Minister of Finance.

== Early life ==
He was son of Francisco Javier Rengifo and Ana Josefa Cardenas Vial. At 15 years old, he supported his mother and siblings.

After the disaster of the Battle of Rancagua (1814) he migrated to Mendoza, Argentina. Ruined several times for bad business, their economic situation improved in Santiago organizing the famous Coffee of the Union.

== Marriage and children ==
Manuel Rengifo was first married to Dolores Vial Formas (parents Manuel Vial), a widower marries Rosario Vial Formas, both daughters of Agustín Vial Santelices.

== Public life ==
On June 19, 1830, he was named finance minister in the administration of Don José Tomás Ovalle. In this position it fit to make an immense task. The country was in the scariest economic deficit when he took over the ministry. One of the most remarkable works of Rengifo, as finance minister, he was the tax and customs reform. Together with it introduced a rigorous economy in public expenditures. Tidied up the mess of debt, both internal and external.

Ovalle was satisfied with the ministerial achievements of the Rengifo, who remained in office until Ovalle's death in 1831. After this, Rengifo remained vice president of Fernando Errázuriz Aldunate and the official presidency José Joaquín Prieto.

Rengifo, part of a moderate faction of the conservaties, distanced himself from Diego Portales's authoritarianism. He considered running in the 1836 presidential election.

He held this ministry on September 19, 1831. Shall subrogate the Ministry of Interior (April 13, 1833). On October 28, 1841, he was again elected minister in the government of President Manuel Bulnes Prieto, and deputy in the Ministry of Interior and Foreign Affairs (December 17, 1841). His parliamentary life is summarized in:

- Elected by Castro in 1828, but was not incorporated.
- Deputy for Chiloé (1828–1829)
- Deputy for San Felipe (1840–1843)
- Senator (1834–1837, 1837–1843 and 1843–1852).

He died in the year of his term as senator.
