= Joaquín Prieto =

Chilean military and political figure

General Joaquín Prieto Vial
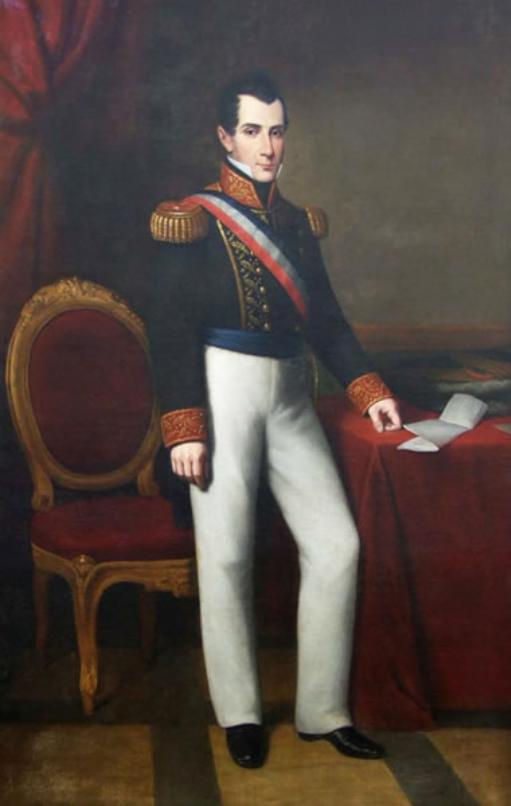

4th President of Chile
- In office 18 September 1831 – 18 September 1841
- Vice President: Diego Portales (1831-1833)
- Preceded by: Fernando Errázuriz Aldunate
- Succeeded by: Manuel Bulnes Prieto

Personal details
- Born: 20 August 1786 Concepción, Chile
- Died: 22 November 1854 (aged 68) Santiago, Chile
- Party: Pelucones (1823-1836); Conservative Party (1836-1854)
- Spouse: Manuela Warnes

Military service
- Battles/wars: Chilean War of Independence; Battle of San Carlos; Battle of Quirihue; Battle of Cauquenes; Battle of Vegas de Saldías; Chilean Civil War of 1829–1830; Battle of Lircay

Joaquín Prieto Vial (Latin American Spanish: [xoˈse xo.aˈkim ˈpɾjeto]; August 20, 1786 – November 22, 1854) was a Chilean military and political figure. As General, he defeated the Pipiolos (Liberals) in the Chilean Civil War of 1829–1830. After the conclusion of the war, he became President of Chile, serving between 1831 and 1841.

He led Chile in the war with Peru between 1836 and 1839.

Joaquín Prieto was of Spanish descent.

== Early life ==
Prieto was one of five sons of a Creole officer in Concepción. After finishing school, he joined the cavalry garrison in his home town. In 1810, he joined the Chilean fight for independence against his father's will. He met Manuela Warnes García de Zúñiga in Buenos Aires and married her in 1812. During the Chilean War of Independence, he served as a captain. In the dispute between Bernardo O'Higgins and José Miguel Carrera, he took the side of O'Higgins, who then made him Quartermaster general of the southern army.

After the defeat in the Battle of Rancagua, which he wasn't a part of, Prieto fled to Mendoza, Argentina to build up the Liberation Army of the Andes. After the victory of the Chileans in the battle of Chacabuco in 1817, in which he also wasn't involved, he was appointed Commanding General of Santiago, where he dealt with defense strategies and military matters. Then, he turned his attention to Peru, in order to support its fight for independence.

His military accomplishments - especially in the south of the country - earned the respect of conservative-centralist circles, which encouraged him to start a political career. He did so in 1823; in this year he was elected into the Chilean House of Deputies and appointed into State council. In this position, he advocated a strong and influential central government and fought the federalist independence ambitions of the regionalists. In 1828, he was elected vice-president of Chile.

== Political career and Civil War of 1829 ==
Prieto's military career continued to progress. In 1828, he was promoted to general and commander of the army in the south. In 1829 presidential elections, neither he nor his liberal-federalist opponent Joaquín Vicuña received an absolute majority. The liberal majority in Congress nominated Francisco Ramón Vicuña, president of the senate, as vice-president. The conservatives considered this move to be unconstitutional and started a civil war.

As commander of the southern army, Prieto Vial marched onto Santiago. On December 14, 1829, he and his troops met the liberal army under Francisco de la Lastra and defeated them at the Battle of Ochagavía. Then, in 1830, an agreement was finally found after the defeat of Ramón Freire at the Battle of Lircay.

== Administration ==
After the transitional president José Tomás Ovalle died, Fernando Errázuriz Aldunate became Provisional President from March 8 to March 31, 1831, rapidly replaced by Prieto himself on April 10. On September 18, 1831, Prieto was finally able to take over the job as elected president for a first term of five years.

His main focus on first taking power was to restore law and order; for that he relied on Diego Portales, who continue to be the almost universal minister and provided political stability for the country to recover from the civil war. He also instructed Manuel Bulnes to seize the bandits commanded by the brothers Pablo and José Antonio Pincheira who made the area around Concepción unsafe. On May 25, 1833, a new constitution was passed, which - with a few amendments - would be valid until 1925. It provided for a 5-year long term of office for the president, who could be re-elected only once. The president received much authority.

During his 10-year-long presidency, Prieto expanded the governmental power and laid the foundation for a public administration in Chile. The first educational establishments like the Instituto Nacional were founded and in 1837 the ministries for justice and public education were created. Prieto's foreign policy was dominated by Chile's war with Peru between 1836 and 1839. The Chilean army under Manuel Blanco Encalada suffered heavy losses, which climaxed in the Treaty of Paucarpata, following which Manuel Bulnes took over the leadership of the army and led it into the victorious Battle of Yungay.

=== Cabinet ===
The Prieto Cabinet
Office	Name	Term
President	Joaquín Prieto Vial	10 April 1831–18 September 1841
Minister of the Interior & Foreign Affairs	Diego Portales	5 April 1830–31 August 1831
Ramón Errázuriz	31 August 1831–17 May 1832
Joaquín Tocornal	17 May 1832–25 July 1840
Manuel Montt	25 July 1840–27 March 1841
José Miguel Yrarrázaval	27 March 1841–19 May 1841
Ramón Luis Irarrázaval	19 May 1841–18 September 1945
Minister of War & Navy	Diego Portales	24 March 1831–31 August 1831
Diego Portales	19 September 1831–4 December 1832
Ramón de la Cavareda	4 December 1832–21 April 1835
Diego Portales	21 April 1835–7 June 1836
Ramón de la Cavareda	7 June 1836–27 March 1841
Manuel Montt	27 March 1841–18 September 1841
Secretary of War	Bartolomé Mujica	31 August 1831–19 September 1831
Secretary of Navy	José Manuel Calderón	31 August 1831–19 September 1831
Minister of Finance	Manuel Rengifo	15 June 1830–9 November 1835
Joaquín Tocornal	9 November 1835–14 April 1841
Rafael Correa de Saa	14 April 1841–18 September 1841
Minister of Justice, Clergy & Public Instruction	Mariano Egaña	26 June 1837–27 March 1841
Manuel Montt	27 March 1841–18 September 1841

== Later life ==
In 1841, the victorious hero Bulnes was elected as the successor of Prieto. After his resignation Prieto served as Senator until 1852 and even took over the command of the infantry and the navy of Valparaíso until 1846. In 1846, he moved to Santiago de Chile, where he died on November 22, 1854, at the age of 68.

Political offices
Preceded by Fernando Errázuriz Aldunate	President of Chile; 1831-1841	Succeeded by Manuel Bulnes Prieto
Military offices
Preceded by Ramón Freire	Army Commander-in-chief; 1830-1841	Succeeded by Manuel Bulnes Prieto
Preceded by Robert Simpson	Navy General Commander; 1844-1845	Succeeded by Robert Simpson
