= Juan Egaña =

Chilean philosopher and politician

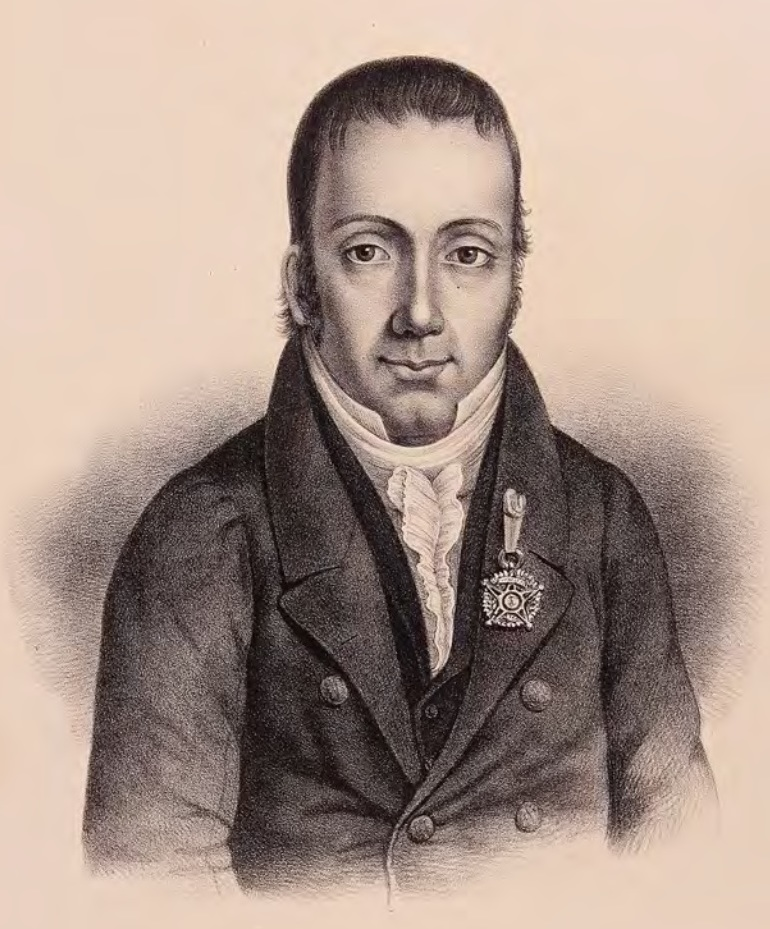

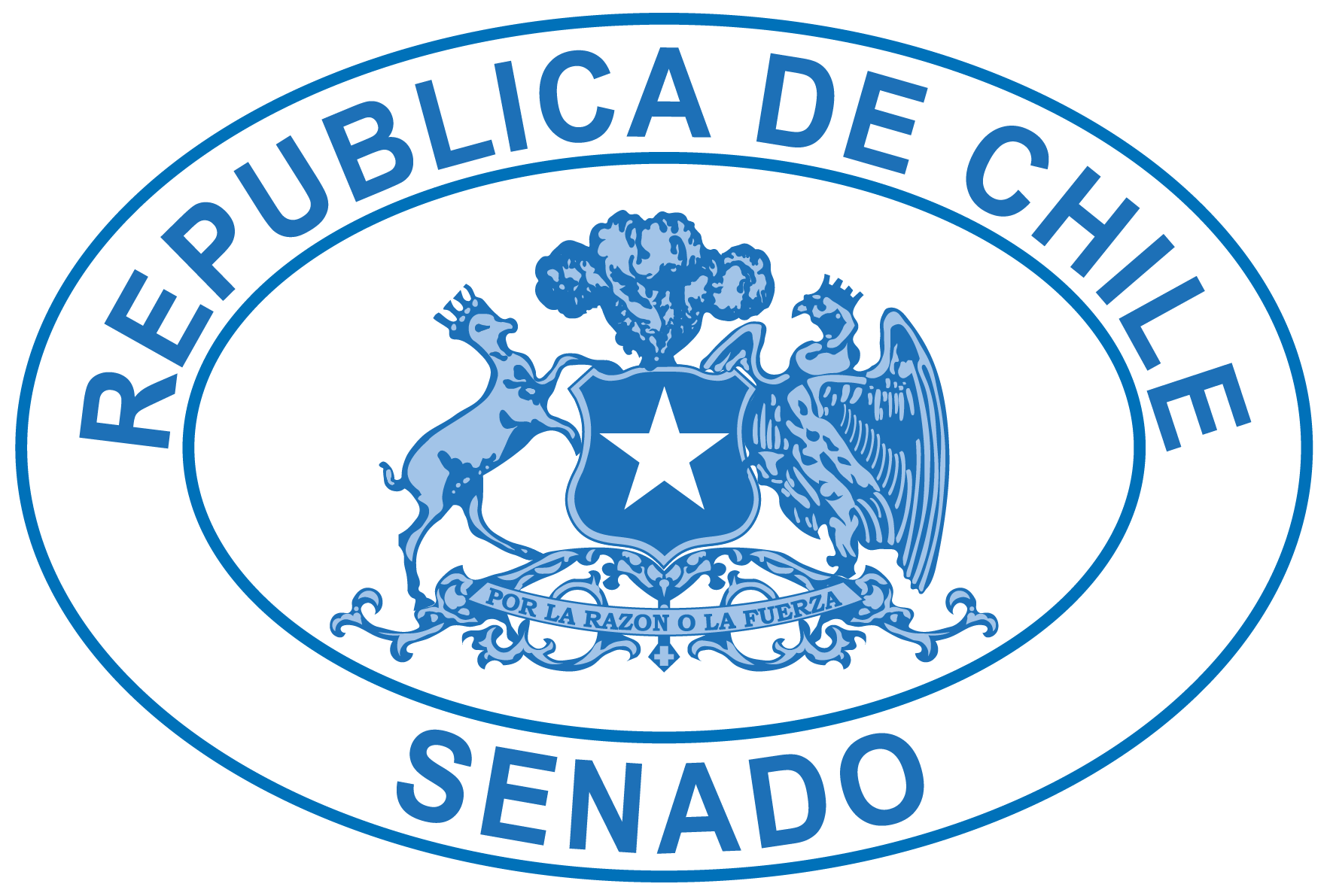
President of the Senate of the Republic of Chile
- In office 1813–1813
- Preceded by: Camilo Henríquez
- Succeeded by: Francisco Ruiz-Tagle
- In office 1827–1827
- Preceded by: Agustín Eyzaguirre
- Succeeded by: Juan de Dios Vial del Río

Personal details
- Born: 31 October 1769 Lima, Viceroyalty of Peru
- Died: 20 April 1836 (aged 66) Santiago, Chile
- Party: None
- Children: Mariano Egaña (son)
- Education: University of Lima Royal University of San Felipe (MA)
- Occupation: Politician
- Profession: Philosopher

Juan Egaña Risco (born 31 October 1769 – 20 April 1836) was a Chilean politician and liberal philosopher who wrote the 1823 Constitution of Chile and served as President of the Senate of Chile.

Egaña was born in Lima and studied there, first at the Santo Toribio Seminary College where he received a degree in philosophy and later theology and law. He attended the National University of San Marcos and received degrees in Canon and Civil Law in August 1789.

Egaña came to Chile in October 1789. His degrees from Peru were recognized by the Royal University of San Felipe a year later. When the chair of Latin and rhetoric was created, he was appointed its full professor. Egaña was also a landowner and businessman. He had a silver mine and sugar mill. He was secretary of the Royal Mining Tribunal between 1802 and 1806.

He promoted creating the National Institute. When it was established in 1813, he became a professor. He remained in the position until retiring in 1826.

== Politics ==
Egaña was a member of the first National Congress, representing Melipilla, in 1811. He authored the first Constitutional Regulations in 1812 which created the first ballot voting system and further defined citizenship.

In 1812 the first Senate of Chile was formed. He was one of the first seven Senators elected in Chile with Pedro de Vivar as President of the Senate. One of his proclamations was the founding of the National Library. He contributed part of his library to create the first collection. In October 1813 the Junta suspended the legislature due to the War with Spain.

When Spain returned to power in 1814, Egaña was taken prisoner and confined on the Juan Fernández Islands along with his son Mariano Egaña. He remained there until 1817. When he returned he was appointed acting Secretary of Government and War.

He led a commission responsible for drafting the 1823 constitution. Egaña often wrote of moral issues and the constitution was no exception. He wrote of how the national morality would lead to happiness and tranquility for the people of Chile.

He was elected as a representative of both Melipilla and Santiago in 1823 and chose to represent Santiago. In 1824 he was President of the Senate. In 1825 he was deputy for Santiago. He was elected again to represent Melipilla for 1826 to 1827. When he could not attend he was replaced. He also did not take his seat when elected Senator for Santiago for 1827 to 1828. He did preside over the Provincial Assembly of Santiago in 1827.

In 1833 Egaña was appointed State Councilor.

== Literary career ==
Along with Camilo Henríquez and Manuel De Salas Corbalán he was part of the "trio of enlightenment". He wrote poetry, theater, essays, and technical and philosophical treaties. He was a regular contributor to Aurora de Chile.

Cartas Pehuenches was a series of journal articles Egaña wrote. They were written in the form of a letter and addressed moral issues. He was working toward developing a national value system. Braulio Arenas credits the second letter, "El Picapleitos", as being the first Chilean short story.

In 1832 he was part of a board responsible for reviewing plays to determine which were suitable to be shown to the public. The two other board members were Andrés Bello and Agustin Vial Santelices.

== Philosophy ==
Education was extremely important to Egaña. He followed scientific experiments in agriculture, botany, physics, and chemistry. He pursued economic studies. He was deeply religious and often wrote on moral issues. In the Draft Constitution education was of top importance for the government.

He felt that Chile should be open to foreigners who wished to trade. He wanted the country to focus on agriculture and industry and to avoid traveling for trade.

Music also was of importance, though musical lyrics he felt needed to reflect the appropriate values for Chile. He included music in official ceremonies.

== Bibliography ==
- The Chilean consoled in the prisons: memoirs of my work and reflections written in the act of suffering and thinking, London, 1826
- Memorable Times and Events of Chile: 1810-1814 , Santiago
- Memoir on my public services, 1822
- Defense Plan: studied by a commission composed of Don Juan Egaña, Don José Samaniego and the captain of engineers Don Juan Mackenna and proposed to the Honorable Governing Board by the Santiago City Council, Santiago
- Plan of government: prepared and proposed to the president of the Honorable Governing Board, Santiago
- Political analysis of whether freedom of worship is appropriate in Chile
- Philosophical and poetic leisure in the fifth of delights
