= José Nicolás de la Cerda =

Chilean politician and aristocrat

José Nicolás de la Cerda Concha Santiago (1767-1847) was a Chilean politician and aristocrat. His father was Nicolás de la Cerda y Sanchez de Barreda and his mother was Nicolasa de Santiago Concha y Lobaton. He was born and died in Santiago.

== Biography ==
He embraced the cause of Chilean independence, but was considered a moderate. In 1810, he participated in establishing the Junta de Gobierno that governed Chile in the name of deposed King Ferdinand VII. He was a member of the First National Congress on July 4, 1811, as deputy for Santiago. On September 4, 1811, after the coup of José Miguel Carrera against the Congress, he was forced to leave his seat in favor of Francisco de la Lastra.

Following the establishment of full independence in 1817, he participated in the drafting of the Constitution of 1822, by which legislative elections were called, and he was elected MP for Petorca, a position he was reelected in 1822 and 1823. In the elections of 1824 he represented San Felipe.
