= Battle of Lircay =

Battle in the Chilean Civil War of 1829–30

- Part of the Chilean Civil War of 1829–1830
Date	April 17, 1830
Location	near Talca, Chile
Result	Pelucones (Conservative) victory: Treaty of Cuz Cuz

Belligerents
(Chile) Pipiolos (Liberals)	(Chile) Pelucones (Conservatives)

Commanders and leaders
(Chile) Ramón Freire (surrendered) (Chile) Guillermo Tupper † (Chile) Benjamín Viel (surrendered) (Chile) Giuseppe Rondizzoni (WIA)	Joaquín Prieto Vial (Chile) José María de la Cruz (Chile) Manuel Bulnes

Strength
1,750 (1,100 infantry; 600 cavalry; 50 artilleryman with 4 cannons)	2,200 (1,300 infantry; 400 mounted infantry; 500 cavalry); 12 cannons

Casualties and losses
350 killed 1,000 captured	89+killed

The Battle of Lircay was the last battle of the Chilean Civil War of 1829–1830 and ended with the Pipiolos (Liberals) being decisively defeated by the conservative faction of Chile politics. Pipiolo leader Ramon Freire was exiled to Peru and the Pipiolos defeated to end the war, beginning a 30-year dominance of the Government of Chile by the Conservatives.
