= Chilean Civil War of 1829–1830 =

1829–30 ideological conflict in Chile between liberal and conservative forces

Date	1829–1830
Location	Chile
Result	Pelucones victory: Conservative republic begins

Belligerents
Pelucones; Military of Chile: Chilean Army; Chilean Navy	(Chile) Pipiolos

Commanders and leaders
Joaquín Prieto; Manuel Bulnes; Diego Portales	Ramón Freire; Francisco de la Lastra; Francisco Ramón Vicuña

Casualties and losses
- 2000 killed and wounded

The Chilean Civil War of 1829–1830 (Spanish: Guerra Civil de 1829–1830), or the First Chilean Civil War, was a civil war in Chile fought between conservative Pelucones and liberal Pipiolos forces over the constitutional regime in force. This conflict ended with the defeat of the liberal forces and the approval of a new constitution in 1833, that was in force until 1925.

== Background ==
The resignation and self-exile of General Bernardo O'Higgins in 1823 did not put an end to the political infighting. Civil conflict continued, focusing mainly on the issues of anticlericalism and regionalism. Presidents and constitutions rose and fell quickly in the 1820s. The Chilean political scene divided itself into two groups that were already embryonic during the days of independence. The followers of O'Higgins became the Conservatives or Bigwigs (Spanish: Pelucones). This group was mainly composed of the remnants of the colonial aristocracy, and defended the ideas of a strong central government, respect for tradition, and strong support for the Catholic Church. Their most prominent leaders were José Gregorio Argomedo, Juan Egaña and José Joaquín Prieto. Opposed to them were the Liberals (Spanish: Pipiolos). This group was mainly composed of the followers of José Miguel Carrera, and were strongly influenced by European liberal ideas. They defended a more free and democratic government, without interference from the Church. Their leaders were Ramón Freire, Manuel Borgoño and Francisco Antonio Pinto.

The Conservatives and the Liberals began to coalesce around the church-state issue. Not only more favorably inclined toward the church, the Conservatives were also more sympathetic than the Liberals toward the colonial legacy, authoritarian government, the supremacy of executive powers, and a unitary state. Together with these two political tendencies, which in time developed into the two main political parties of the 19th century, there were also some minority groups. One of them was the Federalist Party under the leadership of José Miguel Infante, who promoted a model of government based on the one adopted by the United States. Another group was the Estanqueros or Monopolists (estanco means monopoly), a very heterogeneous political group under the leadership of Diego Portales. The name came out of the fact that most of them were merchants, and their leader, Portales, was in charge of the tobacco monopoly. Their principal figures were Juan Francisco Meneses (ex-monarchist); Manuel José Gandarillas (Carrera supporter) and José Antonio Rodríguez Aldea (O'Higgins supporter).

== Constitutional essays ==
The time between 1823 and 1828 is called of the Constitutional Essays. The first of these three essays is the Moralist system (1823) of Juan Egaña, which created a unitary state, democratic (with the franchise restricted to men of the upper classes) and Catholic. The executive power was in the hands of a Supreme Director, elected for four years and to be reelected only once. This system was no sooner in place when it came under attack from the proponents of a federalist system. The abolition of slavery in this constitution – long before most other countries in the Americas – is considered one of the liberals' few lasting achievements.

In their impatience, the Federalist leaders forced Congress to adopt some laws giving federal rights to the provinces. In 1825, José Miguel Infante was President of the Directorial Council that was in charge of the administration while Supreme Director Freire was away capturing Chiloé from Royalist forces. Using their position, the councillors created the eight Provincial Assemblies that would become the basis for the federal system. The eight provinces were: Coquimbo, Aconcagua, Santiago, Colchagua, Maule, Concepción, Valdivia and Chiloé. The second essay thus was the Federalist written by Infante in 1826, though it was never formally adopted.

=== Election of 1826 ===
On July 14, 1826 Congress passed a law calling for a new election. The Supreme Director was to be replaced by a president. The first elected president was Manuel Blanco Encalada, who, with 59.5% of the vote and 22 electoral votes, defeated José Miguel Infante who only obtained 40.5% of the vote and 15 electoral votes. For the position of vice president Agustín Eyzaguirre, with 57.1% of the vote and 20 electoral votes, defeated Francisco Antonio Pinto who received 42.9% of the vote and 15 electoral votes. The system very quickly proved to be a failure. Blanco Encalada resigned, and was replaced by Eyzaguirre in 1827. He in turn was deposed by colonel Enrique Campino Salamanca, who called back general Ramón Freire.

=== Constitution of 1828 ===
The first (of many) measures of the new government was to call for a constitutional convention. Congress confirmed the return of General Freire and proceeded to dissolve itself. Immediately after, Freire resigned and was replaced by his vice-president Francisco Antonio Pinto.

In August 1828, Pinto's first year in office, Chile abandoned its short-lived federalist system for a unitary form of government, with separate legislative, executive, and judicial branches. The new constitution was finalized in 1828 by José Joaquín de Mora together with Melchor Santiago Concha. This became the third or Liberal essay. The government became a unitary system, but maintained the eight provincial assemblies created by the federalist essay. The executive was in the hands of a president, elected for five years who was prohibited from running for re-election.

By adopting a moderately liberal constitution in 1828, Pinto alienated both the Federalists and the Liberal factions. He also angered the old aristocracy by abolishing estates inherited by primogeniture and caused a public uproar with his anticlericalism.

=== Election of 1829 ===
It was not a military incident which caused the revolution, but a mere political disagreement that led to anarchy. A new presidential election was called in 1829. The clear winner (out of 9 candidates) was General Francisco Antonio Pinto, liberal and already Provisional President since the resignation of Freire in 1827, with 118 electoral votes and 29.1% of the vote.

The problem happened with the vice presidential election. The winner should have been the first runner-up, Francisco Ruiz-Tagle with 98 electoral votes or 24.1% of the vote, or the second runner-up, General José Joaquín Prieto, with 61 votes or 15.0% of the vote, both conservatives. Nonetheless, Congress was controlled by the Liberals and presided over by Francisco Ramón Vicuña, also Liberal. Arguing that no vice-presidential candidate had a majority, they selected Joaquín Vicuña, brother of the President of the Senate, even though he only got 48 electoral votes (11.8% of the vote). That was the pretext for the conservatives to rebel.

== Revolution of 1829 ==
The Liberal leader par excellence, General Ramón Freire, rode in and out of the presidency several times (1823–27, 1828, 1829, 1830) but could not sustain his authority. From May 1827 to September 1831, with the exception of brief interventions by Freire, the presidency was occupied by General Francisco Antonio Pinto, Freire's former vice president. The conservative side was under the military leadership of General José Joaquín Prieto and the political guidance of Diego Portales, while the liberal side was under the command of Ramón Freire and Francisco de la Lastra. President Pinto promptly resigned on July 14, handing acting presidential duties not to the vice president but rather to that man's brother, the President of the Senate Francisco Ramón Vicuña.

On December 7, 1829 conservative troops under General Prieto approached Santiago from the South, this army having been assembled largely through the efforts of Prieto's cousin, Manuel Bulnes. The conservative army decided to halt the march for a while and camped a few miles outside the city. The government under President Vicuña immediately collapsed and they fled first to Valparaíso and then northward to Coquimbo. On December 14, 1829, General Prieto and his troops met the liberal army under Francisco de la Lastra and defeated them in the Battle of Ochagavía. Meanwhile, President Vicuña and his ministers were captured and imprisoned by the victorious conservative troops.

Chile was without a leader for a few weeks (from December 7 to 24, 1829). After the Battle of Ochagavía, General Freire agreed to a cease-fire with Prieto. A Government Junta was organized and took control, in order to avoid the continuance of hostilities, under the neutral figure José Tomás Ovalle, who was acceptable to both sides. This junta ruled the country from December 24, 1829 to February 18, 1830. Power was retained by Ramón Freire who organized a liberal convention with the intention of calling for new general elections and the formation of a new Congress. At the same time, the conservatives who were in control of Santiago also called for their own convention, where an agreement was reached which nominated Francisco Ruiz-Tagle as acting president.

Immediately that Ruiz-Tagle took over as president, the principal leaders of the Liberal side (Manuel Borgoño, Francisco de la Lastra and Juan Gregorio de las Heras) were eliminated from the army rosters. This guaranteed the restart of the hostilities. President Ruiz-Tagle and all the cabinet resigned on April 1, and José Tomás Ovalle, as vice president assumed power.

The last engagement happened at the Battle of Lircay, near Talca, on April 17, 1830. The liberals were totally routed, and their leader, General Ramón Freire, was exiled first to Peru and then to Tahiti. Later in life he was allowed to return to Chile, but he never participated in politics again.

Due to the chaotic situation nobody wanted to participate in the government, so President Ovalle named Diego Portales as his universal minister. Portales took over the running of the government bringing with him the political ideas that were to shape Chile for the rest of the century. After the defeat at the Battle of Lircay, the Liberal side finally decided to negotiate and signed the Treaty of Cuz-Cuz, that brought an end to the anarchy and their political dominance and ushered 30 years of conservative governments.

== See also ==
- Ramón Freire
- José Joaquín Prieto
- Francisco Ramón Vicuña
- Francisco Ruiz-Tagle
- José Tomás Ovalle
- Diego Portales

== Sources ==
- Sergio Villalobos, Osvaldo Silva, Fernando Silva y Patricio Estelle; "Historia de Chile, Tomo 3", Editorial Universitaria, Ed. 1995
