= Pedro José Prado =

Chilean military officer and politician

Pedro José Prado Montaner was a Chilean military officer and politician.

He served as Minister of Finance and represented Santiago in the senate. He also participated in the drafting of the Chilean Constitution of 1828.
