= José Manuel Calderón (politician) =

Chilean government official and acting naval secretary

José Manuel Calderón was a Chilean politician. He served as secretary of the Navy of Chile.
