= Diego Portales =

Chilean statesman (1793–1837)

His Excellency Diego Portales
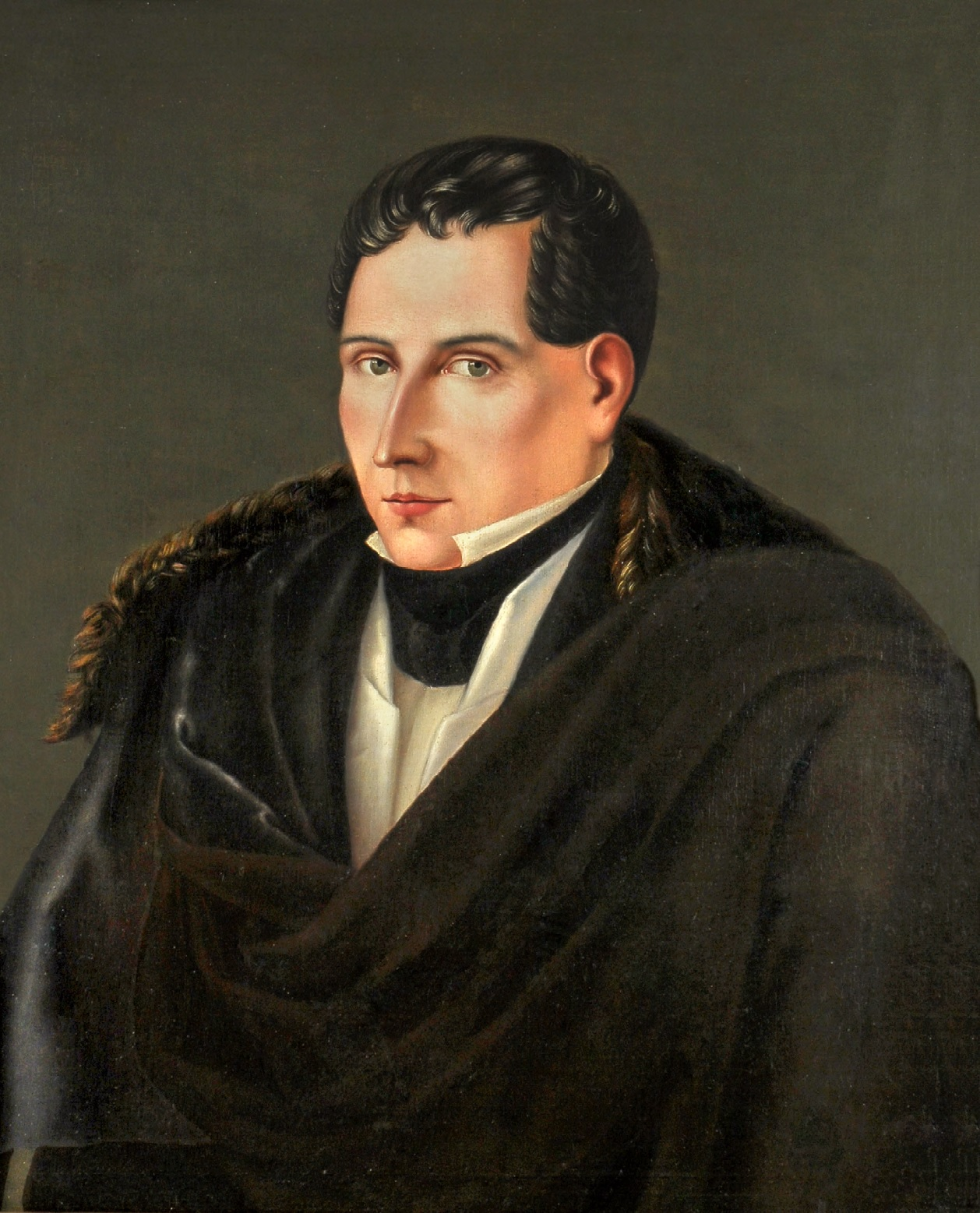

Minister of the Interior and Foreign Affairs
- In office September 11, 1835 – April 19, 1837
- President: José Joaquín Prieto
- Preceded by: Joaquín Tocornal Jiménez
- Succeeded by: Joaquín Tocornal Jiménez
- In office April 6, 1830 – May 1, 1831
- Preceded by: Mariano Egaña Fabres
- Succeeded by: Ramón Errázuriz Aldunate

Minister of War
- In office September 21, 1835 – June 6, 1837
- President: José Joaquín Prieto
- Preceded by: José Javier Bustamante Bustamante|José Javier Bustamante
- Succeeded by: Ramón de la Cavareda
- In office January 17, 1831 – August 31, 1832
- Preceded by: José María de la Cruz Prieto
- Succeeded by: Ramón de la Cavareda

Commander-in-chief of the Chilean Navy
- In office 1833–1834
- Preceded by: José Matías López Orrego
- Succeeded by: Ramón de la Cavareda

Mayor of the province of Valparaíso
- In office 1832–1833
- Preceded by: José María de la Cruz
- Succeeded by: Ramón de la Cavareda

Vice President of Chile
- In office September 18, 1831 – May 26, 1833
- President: José Joaquín Prieto
- Preceded by: José Tomás Ovalle
- Succeeded by: Position abolished

Deputy of the Republic
- In office March 29, 1823 – April 3, 1823
- Constituency: Santiago

Personal details
- Born: Diego José Pedro Víctor Portales y Palazuelos; June 16, 1793 Santiago, Kingdom of Chile
- Died: June 6, 1837 (aged 43) Valparaíso, Republic of Chile
- Cause of death: Assassination
- Resting place: Santiago Metropolitan Cathedral
- Party: Conservative
- Spouse: Josefa Portales y Larraín (m. 1819; died 1821)
- Domestic partner: Constanza de Nordenflycht y Cortés (1823–1837)
- Profession: Entrepreneur, diplomat, politician
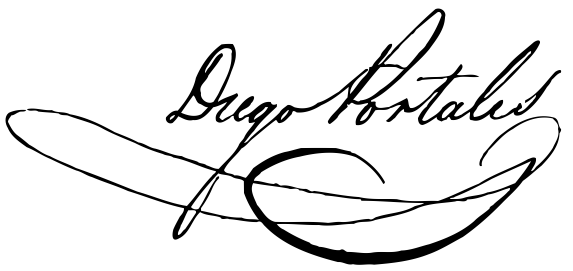
- Signature

Military service
- Allegiance: Chile
- Branch/service: Chilean Navy
- Years of service: 1829–1834
- Rank: Admiral
- Battles/wars: Chilean Civil War of 1829

Diego José Pedro Víctor Portales y Palazuelos (Spanish pronunciation: [ˈdjeɣo poɾˈtales]; June 16, 1793 – June 6, 1837) was a Chilean statesman, military figure and entrepreneur. As a minister of president José Joaquín Prieto's government, he played a pivotal role in shaping the state and politics in the 19th century, delivering with the Constitution of 1833 the framework of the Chilean state for almost a century. Portales' influential political policies included unitarianism, presidentialism and conservatism which led to the consolidation of Chile as a constitutional, authoritarian and aristocratic republic with the franchise restricted to upper class men from the gentry.

While deeply unpopular during his lifetime, his murder in 1837, during an unsuccessful military coup has been judged a decisive factor during the War of the Confederation. Chilean public opinion shifted to support the war against the Peru–Bolivian Confederation. Many Chileans and historians view him as the power behind the throne of the early republic era, particularly in his shaping the Constitution of 1833. While he never assumed the presidency, his influence permitted him to serve simultaneously as the Minister of War, Minister of the Interior and Minister of Foreign Relations. He was an early proponent of Chilean expansionism.

== Early life ==
Coat of arms of the Portales family

Diego Portales was born in Santiago, the son of María Encarnación Fernández de Palazuelos y Martínez de Aldunate and José Santiago Portales y Larraín, a superintendent of the royal mint. He did his primary studies at the Colegio de Santiago, and in 1813, attended law classes at the National Institute. As the men of his family had all become successful merchants, Portales also eventually assumed the position of a merchant, taking part in his prosperous and distinguished family's occupation.

On August 15, 1819, he married his cousin, Josefa Portales y Larraín. He had two daughters with her, both of whom died within days of their birth. His wife also died soon after in 1821. He never remarried, but took Constanza Nordenflicht as his mistress, with whom he had three children.

In July 1821, he resigned from his job at the Mint and went into business. He opened a trading house, Portales, Cea and Co., based in Valparaíso with a branch in Lima, Peru. He bid and obtained management of the government monopoly on tobacco, tea, and liquor (known in Spanish as estanco). In exchange for the monopoly, he offered to service in full Chile's foreign debt. Nonetheless, in the anarchy that was regnant in Chile at the time, there was no means of enforcing a monopoly as the government could not regulate sales of tobacco, tea, and liquor, and the company eventually went bankrupt. His contract with the government was voided and the Chilean government was found to owe Portales 87,000 pesos. Out of this unsuccessful business venture, the only remnant was the name eventually applied to his political followers, who in time came to be known as the estanqueros (monopolists).

== Political career ==
Soon after, he aligned with the conservatives in the political fights that were wracking Chile at the time. As aforementioned, in 1824, Portales' business firm acquired control over the government's monopoly of tobacco, tea, and liquor; however, the country's troubled conditions soon thwarted his profitable business. For these reasons, Portales finally entered into the political sphere, and very soon he would become the intellectual leader of the conservative side. He helped to reorganize the conservative party, and, in 1827, founded El Hambriento (or The Starveling), a journal attacking liberal idealists known as the pipiolos ("white beaks") from Portales' party's (a.k.a. the pelucones or "big wigs") perspective. Portales was an effective satirist, contributing several popular articles to The Starveling. Portales' articles placed him in the limelight and paved the way for his political career.

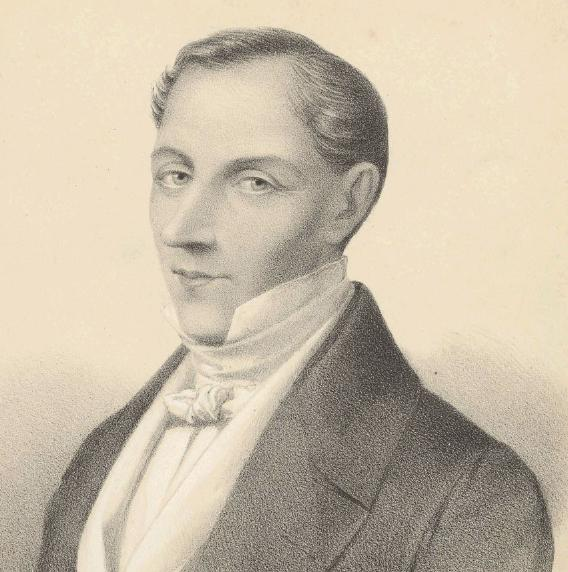
Early print (1854)

After the triumph of the conservatives in the Revolution of 1829, President José Tomás Ovalle y Bezanilla named him Minister of the Interior and Foreign Affairs on April 6, 1830, remaining until May 1831. He was named again to that position by President Fernando Errázuriz Aldunate on July 9, 1831, and remained until August 31, 1831, and named once again by President José Joaquín Prieto from November 9, 1835, to January 1837. Something similar happened with his nomination as minister of war and navy from April 6, 1830, until May 1831; then from July 9, 1831, until December 1832 and from September 21, 1835, to September 1836.

There was an assassination attempt on Portales in November 1836; the assassin was shot and killed.

Though Portales was never president officially (and in fact he deliberately avoided this position for fear of being tied up by factional promises), he became a dictator and with this powerful position, he repressed liberals and purged dissidents from positions of power. Portales set up a civil militia (which ended one of the worst stages of militarism in Chile's history); purged perceived foes from the military; supported an oligarchic control for landowners, miners, and merchants; and made Catholicism the state religion.

=== Political philosophy ===
In 1822, before his rise to power Portales wrote to a friend:

Politics doesn't interest me, but as a good citizen I feel free to express my opinions and to censure the government. Democracy, which is so loudly proclaimed by the deluded is an absurdity in our countries, flooded as they are with vices and with their citizens lacking all sense of civic virtue, the prerequisite to establishing a real Republic. But monarchy is not the American ideal either; if we get out of one terrible government just to jump headlong into another, what will we have gained? The Republican system is the one which we must adopt, but do you know how I interpret it for our countries? A strong central government whose representatives will be men of true virtue and patriotism, and who thus can direct the citizens along the path of order and progress.

These words are demonstrative of the skepticism in pure democracies that the recently failed French revolution impressed upon many. Portales believed that to avoid disaster it was most important to create a stable and functioning government, rather than one ruled by lofty but ultimately impractical ideals. He believed in a peaceful but strong central government, and that in order to successfully run a state or country, citizens must be virtuous and patrioticand must consider the law as higher than any leader. Beyond these beliefs, Portales had no static political beliefs. Instead he tried to govern on a case-by-case basis, legislating what he deemed right for each particular instance.

== Assassination ==
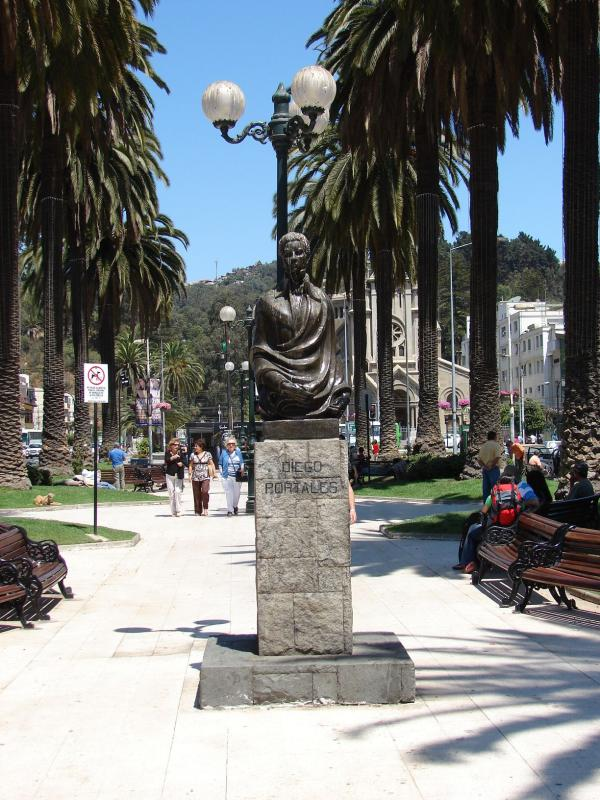
Statue of Minister Diego Portales in Viña del Mar

In order to bolster its standing, the Chilean government immediately imposed martial law and asked for (and obtained) extraordinary legislative powers from Congress. Early in 1837 a Court Martial Law was approved and given jurisdiction over all citizens for the duration of the war. The opposition to the Prieto Vial administration immediately accused Portales of tyranny, and started a heated press campaign against him personally and the unpopular war in general.

Political and public opposition to war immediately affected the army, fresh from the purges of the civil war of 1830. On June 3, 1837, Colonel José Antonio Vidaurre, commander of the Maipo regiment, captured and imprisoned Portales while he was reviewing troops at the army barracks in Quillota. Vidaurre immediately proceeded to attack Valparaíso on the mistaken belief that public opinion opposed to the war would support him and topple the government. Rear Admiral Manuel Blanco Encalada, in charge of the defense, defeated him right outside the port at the Battle of Barón. Captain Santiago Florín, who was in charge of Portales, had him shot when he heard of the news, on June 6, 1837. Most of the conspirators were subsequently captured and executed.

This murder turned the tide of Chilean public opinion. The government derogated Martial law and the country rallied behind the government. The war became a holy cause, and Portales a martyr.

== Legacy ==
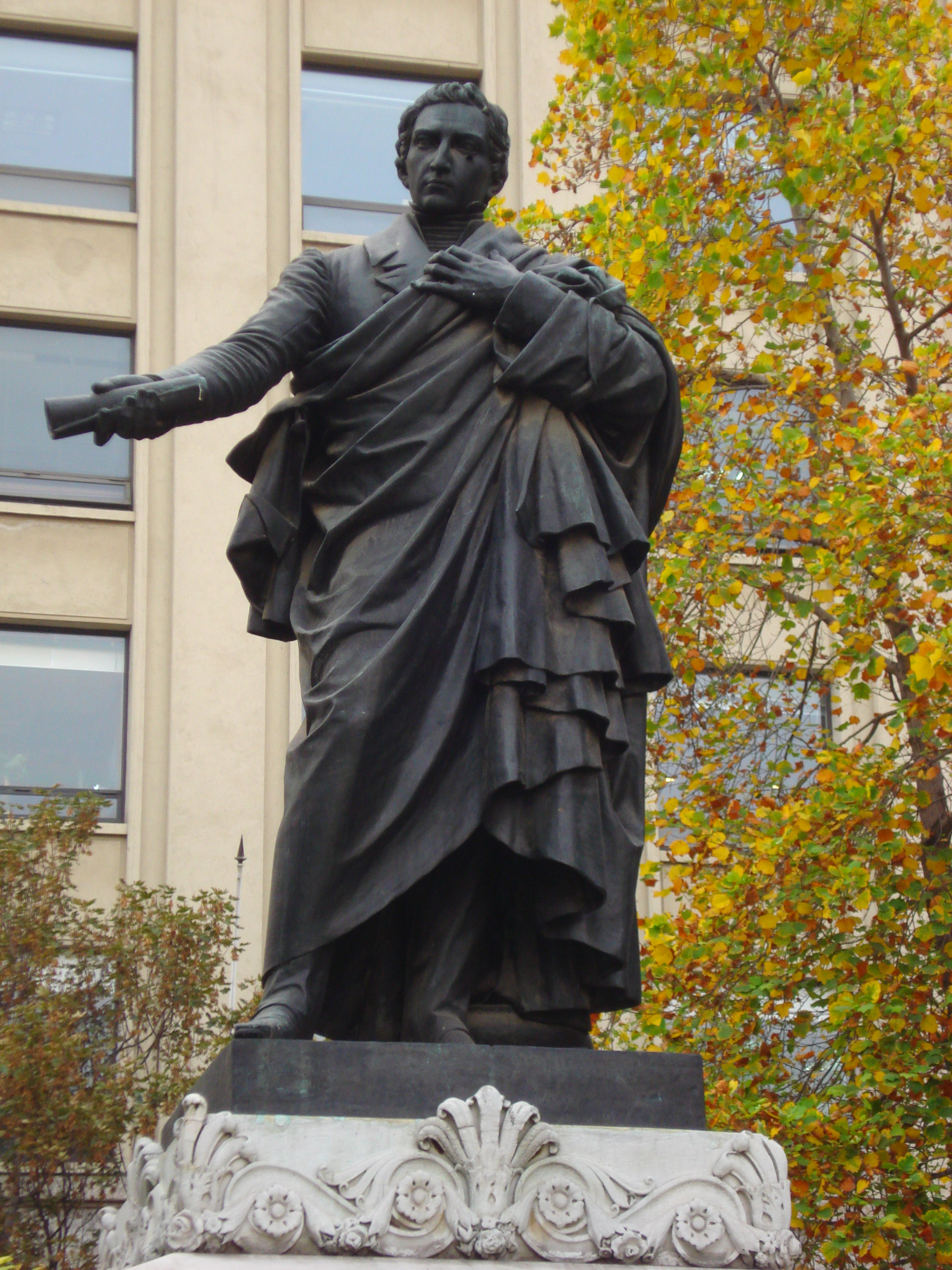
Statue of Portales at the Plaza de la Constitución in the Chilean presidential palace, Santiago

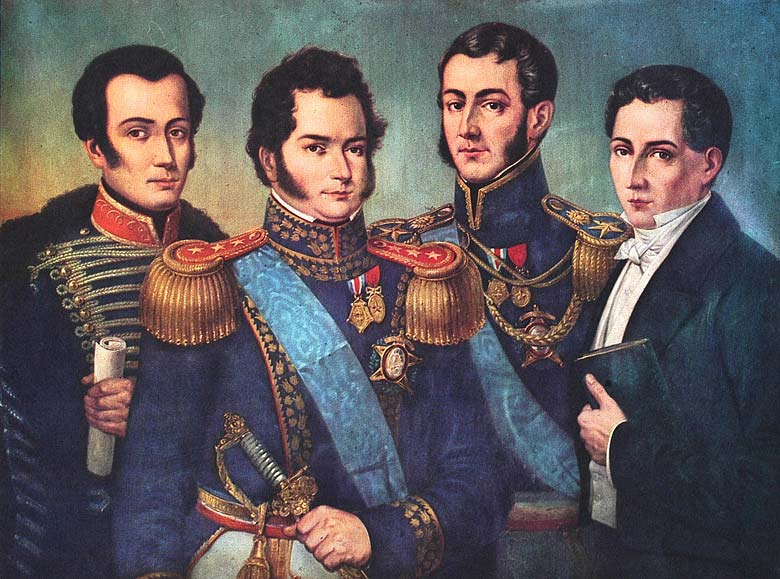
Posthumous (1854) portrait of the Founding Fathers of the Chilean Republic. From left to right: José Miguel Carrera, Bernardo O'Higgins, José de San Martín, and Diego Portales.

Portales' reign helped to pick up business and accelerate the growth of the economy. Those who particularly benefited from his conservative rule were the already rich. Additionally, Portales helped Chile maintain a good deal of stability relative to many of the other Latin American nations. This was accomplished by Portales' improvement and renewal of the administration of the State, his strategic vision of Chile as an independent sovereign nation, and his influence upon the Chilean Constitution of 1833, which is considered the most important milestone of Chilean institutionality during the 19th century. His ideals and principles served as a foundation towards the Chilean governments of the future. His work was especially influential during the years of political learning of the post-independence turmoil and during the governments of the Conservative Republic (1830–1861) and to a lesser degree the governments of the Liberal Republic (1861–1891).

...we are inspired in the Portalian spirit that has fused together the nation...

— Augusto Pinochet, October 11, 1973.

The figure and legacy of Portales has been praised by some historians like Ramón Sotomayor Valdés and Alberto Edwards. Other historians, including Benjamín Vicuña Mackenna, Sergio Villalobos and Gabriel Salazar, have a negative view of Portales.

== Remains ==
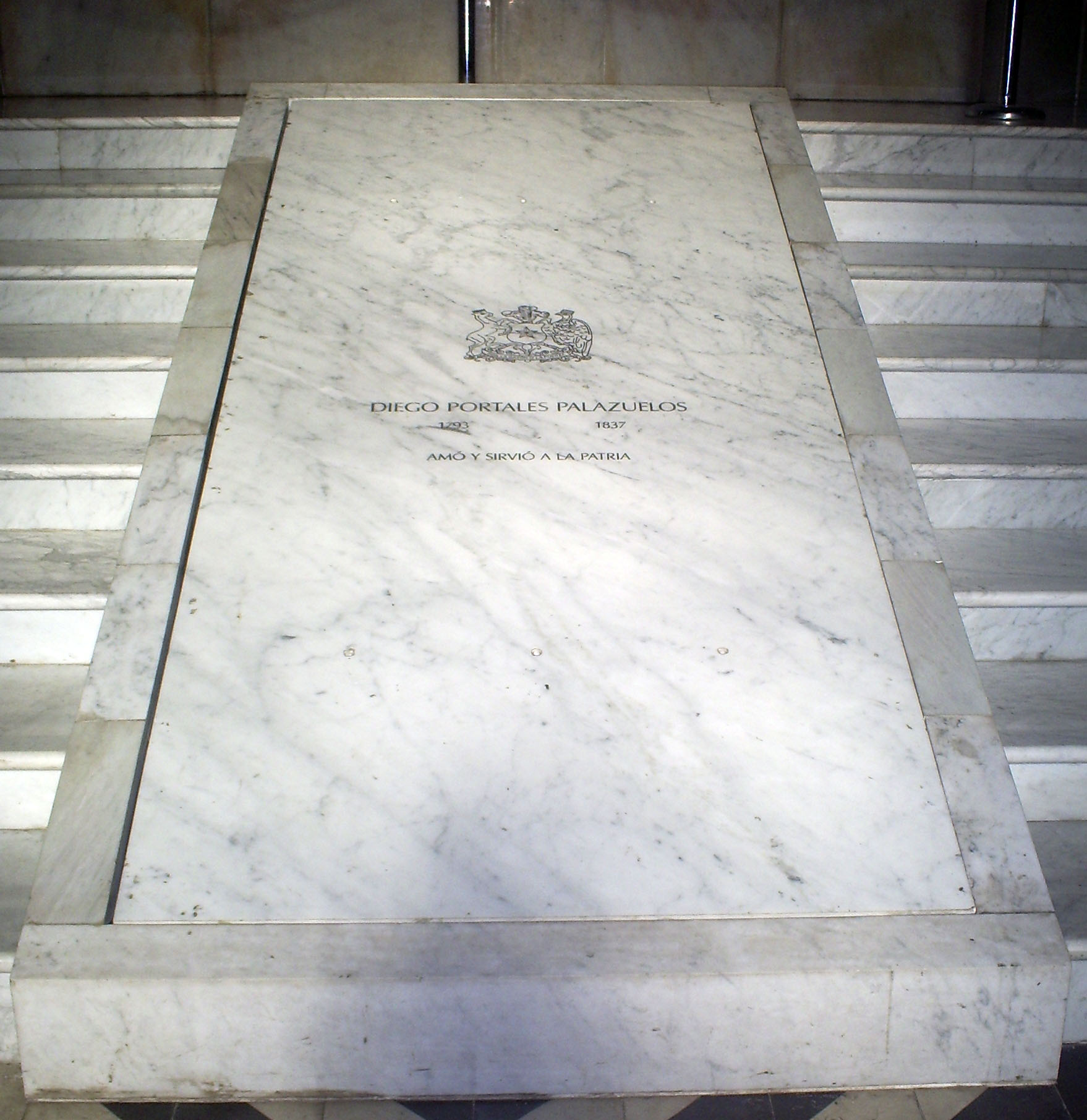
Portales' crypt in the Santiago Cathedral following his reburial

Portales' remains, missing since his assassination, were found in March 2005 in Santiago's Metropolitan Cathedral during renovation projects, and were identified after forensic examination. On June 20, 2006, the remains were taken to the civic crypt of the Cathedral for a civic-religious re-burial ceremony attended by then-President Michelle Bachelet, along with several civil and military authorities.

== See also ==
- Chilean Civil War of 1829–1830
- Francisco de Meneses Brito

Government offices
Preceded by Juan Francisco Meneses	Minister of the Interior and Foreign Affairs; 1830-1831	Succeeded by Ramón Errázuriz
Preceded by José María de la Cruz	Minister of War and Navy; 1831-1835	Succeeded by Ramón de la Cavareda
Preceded by Ramón de la Cavareda	Minister of War and Navy; 1835-1836	Succeeded by Ramón de la Cavareda
Preceded by Joaquín Tocornal	Minister of the Interior and Foreign Affairs; 1835-1837	Succeeded by Joaquín Tocornal
Military offices
Preceded by José Matías López	Navy General Commander; 1833-1834	Succeeded by Ramón de la Cavareda
