= Pelucones =

Term for conservative aristocrats in early 19th-century Chile

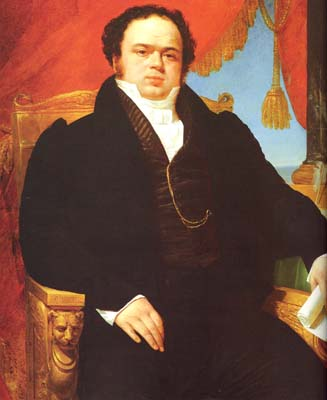
Mariano Egaña, was a notable Pelucón; politically he felt affinity to constitutional monarchy as a form of government.

Pelucones (Spanish for bigwigs) was the name used to refer to Chilean aristocratic conservatives in early 19th century. The name "Pelucones" was originally used by the Pipiolos, or Liberals, as a derogatory term linking the conservatives to old fashioned wigs that were popular in the 18th century. Following the Chilean Civil War of 1829, when the Pipiolos were defeated, the Pelucones enforced the Chilean Constitution of 1833. This led to creation of a strong unitary, authoritarian and presidentialist system supported and maintained by the upper classes.
