= Ramón Freire =

Interim Supreme Director of Chile and Third President of Chile

General Ramón Freire LMCh
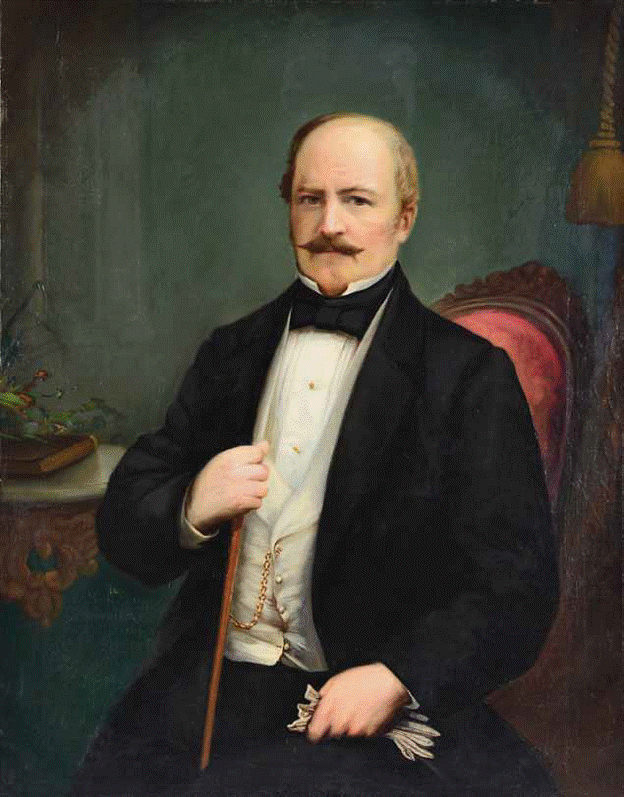

2nd President of Chile
- In office 25 January 1827 – 8 May 1827
- Vice President: Francisco Antonio Pinto
- Preceded by: Agustín Eyzaguirre
- Succeeded by: Francisco Antonio Pinto

3rd Supreme Director of Chile
- In office 4 April 1823 – 9 July 1826
- Preceded by: Bernardo O'Higgins
- Succeeded by: Manuel Blanco Encalada (as President)

Personal details
- Born: 29 November 1787 Santiago, Viceroyalty of Peru
- Died: 9 December 1851 (aged 64) Santiago, Chile
- Party: Pipiolos (1823–1849); Liberal Party (1849–1851)
- Spouse: Manuela Caldera (m. 1826)
- Children: 4, including Francisco Freire

Military service
- Battles/wars: Chilean War of Independence; Battle of El Roble; Battle of El Quilo; Battle of Rancagua; Battle of Maipú; Chilean Civil War of 1829–1830; Battle of Lircay

Ramón Saturnino Andrés Freire y Serrano (Latin American Spanish: [raˈmoɱ ˈfɾejɾe]; November 29, 1787 – December 9, 1851) was a Chilean political figure. He was head of state on several occasions, and enjoyed a numerous following until the War of the Confederation. Ramón Freire was one of the principal leaders of the liberal Pipiolo movement.

The settlement of Santa Rosa was renamed to Freirina in his honor in 1824.

== Early life ==
He was born in Santiago on November 29, 1787, the son of Francisco Antonio Freire y Paz and Gertrudis Serrano y Arrechea. An orphan from early age, he was raised in a hacienda by his maternal uncles near the town of Colina. He became an orphan again at age 16, and moved to the city of Concepción where he worked as a clerk in a store, and later as an apprentice in a merchant ship.

== War of Independence ==
At the beginning of the independence struggle in 1810, he became actively involved in the public meetings that accompanied the establishment of the first Junta. In 1811, he became a cadet of the Dragones de la Frontera, and participated in the battles of Huilquilemu, Talcahuano, El Roble and El Quilo during the Chilean War of Independence.

By the time of the Rancagua disaster and the end of the Patria Vieja, he was already a captain. With many others he crossed the Andes and went into exile to Buenos Aires. In 1816 he joined the Army of the Andes, and returned to Chile as a battalion commander through the Planchón Pass (in southern Chile), occupying the city of Talca on February 11, 1817.

He fought at the battle of Maipú, was promoted to colonel for his services to the independence, and named Intendant of Concepción under the O'Higgins administration. His friendship with O'Higgins started to crack by degrees, until in 1822 he resigned his position in disagreement. His name became a rallying point for the discontents with O'Higgins, but the two of them never came to an armed conflict.

== As Supreme Director ==
After the resignation of O'Higgins, he became the new Supreme Director, a position he held from April 4, 1823 (when he was named by the Junta de Representantes that replaced O'Higgins) until July 9, 1826. After a brief interlude, he returned to the office on January 25, 1827. His new resignation on February 5, 1827 was not accepted, and he was elected president on February 15 of the same year. He resigned again on the following May 5, 1827.

During his administration he promoted some initiatives of enormous impact, such as the abolition of slavery, the reorganization of the defense system of the port of Valparaíso, and opening Chilean markets to world commerce. He also highlighted the freedom of the press and ordered all convents and monasteries to open free schools.

On December 29, 1823 he promulgated a new constitution, based on the project presented by Juan Egaña. Considered a highly moralistic document, it reflected the idea that the very essence of the people can be changed by its laws. It tried to regulate both the public and private conduct of the citizens. Such approach very soon proved impracticable, and the Constitution was abandoned after only six months.

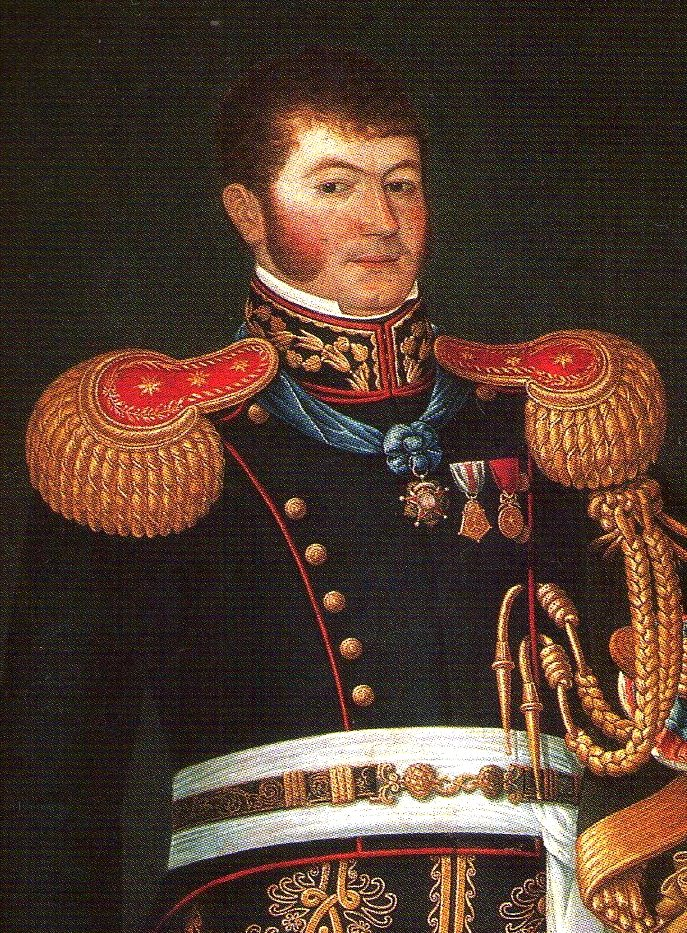
Portrait of Freire.

Since the Chilean treasury was exhausted by the independence wars, and heavily mortgaged by the first foreign loan, contracted with British banks, Freire created a government monopoly (estanco) over tobacco, alcohols, cards and tax paper, same that was assigned to Portales, Cea and Co. and turned in a huge fiasco. This affair marked the first involvement in public government of the future universal minister, Diego Portales.

He also completed the independence of the whole territory when he captured Chiloé Island, which was still held by Spain. After failed military campaigns in 1824 that ended in defeat at Mocopulli, and the 1826 battles of Pudeto and Bellavista, he signed the Treaty of Tantauco, in which Spain definitively renounced claims to that area.

=== Muzi mission ===
At about the same time, an apostolic mission arrived in Chile, sent by the Pope, and headed by Monsignor Juan Muzi. The object of the mission was to fix the relations between Chile and the Holy See. A conflict soon developed because Chile felt it had inherited the rights of patronage held by the Spanish crown, and the Holy See felt differently. In the interim, the government had adopted several measures asserting its control over the church, such as the reformation of the monastic orders, the seizure of church property, and the exile of a bishop who had actively opposed independence. Monsignor Muzi was adamant in its refusal, and asked for his passports, severing relations between the two states.

In the domestic arena, conflicts, especially with the supporters of O'Higgins, worsened to such a point that Freire was dismissed during a campaign in 1825, being reinstated upon his return. Nonetheless, the multiple conflicts forced Freire to resign on July 9, 1826, handing over the power to Admiral Manuel Blanco Encalada, who assumed with the new title of "President of the Republic".

== As President ==
A new revolution brought him back to power on January 25, 1827 as Provisional President. After order was restored, he resigned again on February 5, but his resignation was rejected by Congress, who proceeded to confirm him as president on February 15. He finally resigned on May 5, 1827.

During his period there was the attempt, headed by José Miguel Infante, to establish a federal system of government. In fact, the Chilean Congress dictated a number of laws to that effect. The idea was to formulate a federative republic based on the example of the United States. Many conflicts erupted among the new States-Provinces that made the new system collapse very quickly.

=== Cabinet ===
The Freire Cabinet
Office	Name	Term
President	Ramón Freire	25 January 1827–5 May 1827
Minister of Government & Foreign Affairs	Pbtro. José Miguel del Solar	8 March 1827–13 December 1827
Minister of War & Navy	General José Manuel Borgoño	8 March 1827–16 July 1829
Minister of Finance	Ventura Blanco Encalada	8 March 1827–23 July 1828

== Later life ==
Originally he retired to the Cucha-cucha Hacienda, but shortly afterwards returned to political infighting in the Chilean Civil War of 1829. His final defeat came at the battle of Lircay. He was then imprisoned and later sent into exile in Peru. In Peru, and with the help of Marshal Andrés de Santa Cruz, he outfitted a small expedition and attempted to capture the island of Chiloé. After failing in his purpose, he was again imprisoned at the port of Valparaíso, court-martialled, and exiled first to the island of Juan Fernández, and afterwards to Tahiti and in 1837 temporarily resettled in Australia.

He was allowed to return to Chile in 1842, where he lived peacefully until his death on December 9, 1851.

== Personal life ==
On 1 October 1826, Freire married Manuela Caldera. Caldera and Freire had four children, including

- Zenón Freire Caldera (1827–1898), politician; married Mercedes García de la Huerta Pérez
- Liborio Ramón Freire Caldera (1829–1884), politician; married Rosario García de la Huerta Pérez
- Francisco Freire (1839–1900), lawyer, farmer and politician; married Enriqueta Valdés Solar

Freire was the great-grandmother of the diplomat Carmen Vial Freire Dows, and was the uncle of Nicolás Freire González, a Peruvian military officer and politician. Freire was the grandfather of Osmán Pérez Freire.

== See also ==
- Chilean Civil War of 1829–1830

Political offices
Preceded by Bernardo O'Higgins	Supreme Director of Chile; 1823–1826	Succeeded by Manuel Blanco Encalada (as President of the Republic)
Preceded by Agustín Eyzaguirre	President of Chile; 1827	Succeeded by Francisco Antonio Pinto
Military offices
Preceded by Bernardo O'Higgins	Army Commander-in-chief; 1823–1830	Succeeded by José Joaquín Prieto
