= José Rodríguez Aldea =

José Antonio Rodríguez Aldea (August 6, 1779 – June 3, 1841) was a Chilean politician operating during the early years of the republic. He was minister of finance and minister of war in the government of Bernardo O'Higgins.
