= Faculty of Law, University of Chile =

Law school of the University of Chile

Faculty of Law University of Chile
- Facultad de Derecho; Universidad de Chile
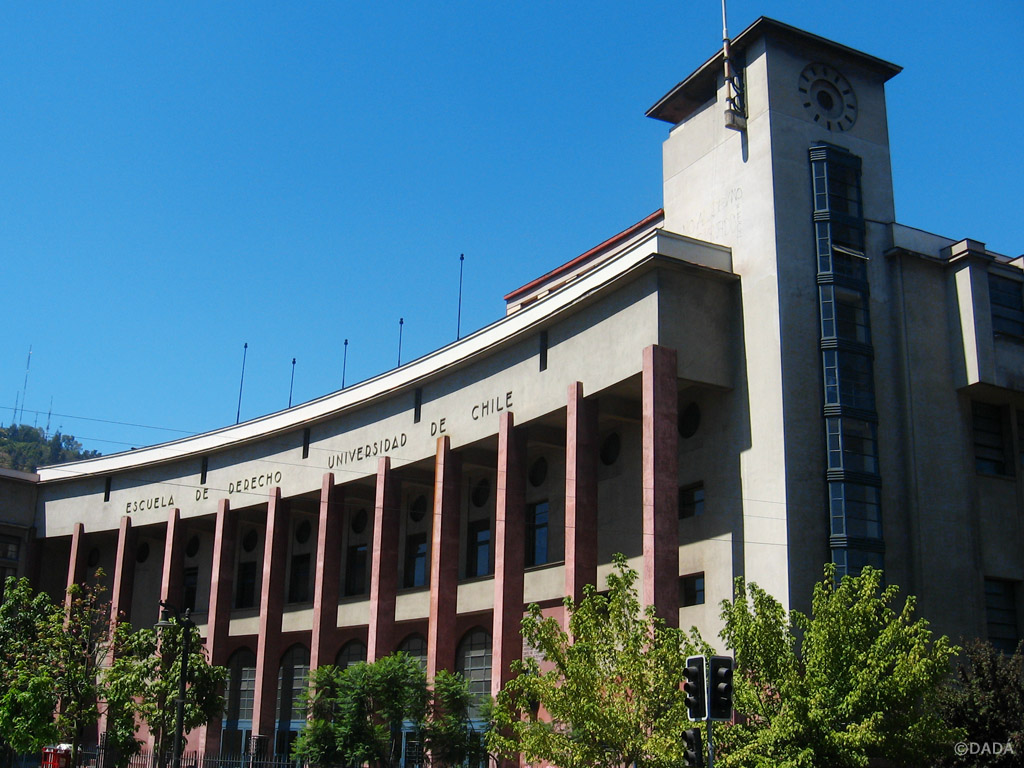
- Front façade of the Faculty of Law of the University of Chile
- Other names: Derecho UChile, Derecho UCh
- Type: Public
- Established: 19 November 1842
- Affiliations: University of Chile
- Vice-president: Francisco Soto Barrientos
- Dean: Pablo Ruiz-Tagle Vial
- Faculty: 293 (2019)
- Students: 3,635 (undergraduate, 2017); 218 (postgraduate, 2017)
- Location: Pío Nono #1, Providencia; Santiago, Chile. Andrés Bello Campus, Providencia, Chile
- Campus: Urban
- Student government: University of Chile Law Students' Center
- Website: derecho.uchile.cl

The Faculty of Law of the University of Chile is one of the five original faculties that formed the founding body of the University of Chile and has historically been the most influential law school in the country. Also known as Derecho UChile or the Law School, it has produced seventeen Presidents of Chile, as well as numerous ministers of State, members of parliament, judges, and prominent figures in Chilean history, including the naval hero Arturo Prat.

Founded in 1842, it operated in various buildings in Santiago before moving in 1938 to its current Art Deco-style building, inaugurated during the presidency of Arturo Alessandri Palma and designed by architect Juan Martínez Gutiérrez. Located in the commune of Providencia at the intersection of Pío Nono and Santa María avenues, the Faculty houses undergraduate, graduate, and research programs in law. In 2007, the Presidents' Building, designed by Humberto Eliash and Moreno Marsino Arquitectos, was inaugurated, containing classrooms, an auditorium, cafeteria, gymnasium, and parking.

== History ==
=== Background (1747–1842) ===
Before the founding of the University of Chile, legal studies in Chile were conducted at the Royal University of San Felipe, established by royal decree in 1738 under King Philip V of Spain. Classes began in 1758, replicating the curricula of major colonial universities such as San Marcos in Lima and the Royal and Pontifical University of Mexico. One of its faculties was that of Sacred Canons and Laws, centered on the ius commune, i.e., Roman law texts from Justinian I's Corpus Juris Civilis compilation and canon law such as the Decretals of Gregory IX. Degrees awarded were bachelor, licentiate, and doctor.

On the initiative of Ambrosio Zerdán and Pontero, in April 1778, the Royal Carolina Academy of Laws and Forensic Practice was established under the Royal Audiencia of Santiago, granting the title of lawyer to law bachelors after forensic practice. However, the independence process in Chile in 1810 led to questioning of colonial institutions, and the Academy was closed four years later.

The educational role of the University of San Felipe declined after the opening of the National Institute on 27 July 1813, which closed during the Spanish reconquest and reopened in 1819. The university, stripped of its "Royal" title, limited itself to granting bachelor degrees, while its curriculum was reformed to include courses on "natural law, law of nations, and political economy" and "patriotic laws, canon law, and forensic practice". Parallel institutions of short duration, such as the Liceo de Chile founded by José Joaquín de Mora and the Colegio de Santiago involving Andrés Bello, also offered law courses.

In 1828 the Academy of Laws and Forensic Practice reopened, and in 1832 the National Institute's curriculum was reorganized, reinstating Roman law studies and adding Bello's course on Universal Legislation developed at the Colegio de Santiago.

=== Foundation ===
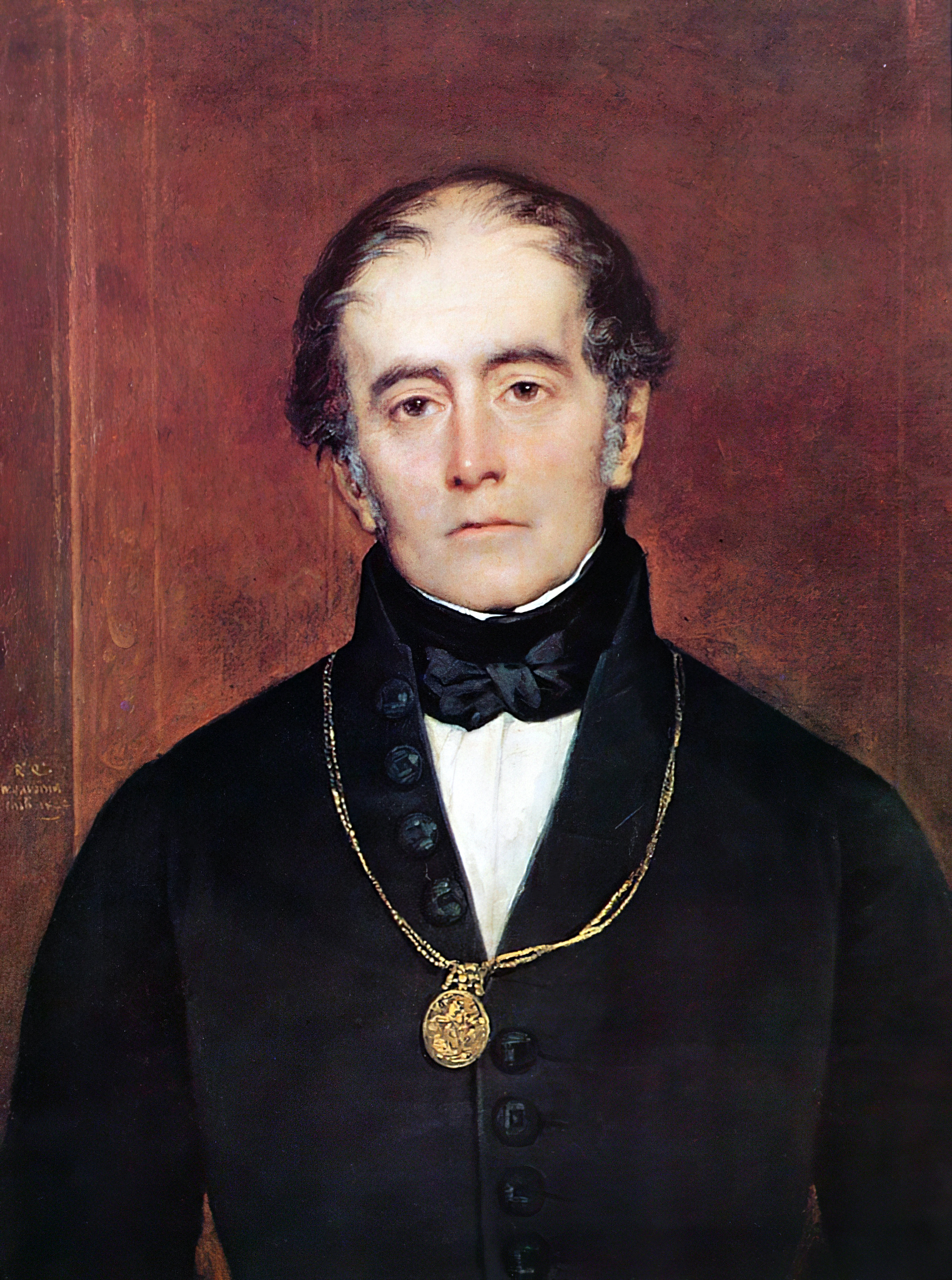
Andrés Bello (1781–1865), first rector of the University of Chile and prominent Venezuelan jurist.

The University of San Felipe of the Republic of Chile, as renamed in 1829, had been in clear decline since the 1810s and was finally closed in 1839 under President José Joaquín Prieto to be replaced by the University of Chile. On 19 November 1842, a law drafted by Andrés Bello established this new institution, composed of five faculties, including that of Laws and Political Sciences. The university was academic rather than teaching, awarding degrees to those who passed advanced courses taught mainly at the National Institute.

On 28 June 1843, the first academics were appointed by supreme decree, including Mariano Egaña, drafter of the 1833 Constitution of Chile, who became the first dean on 21 July 1843, serving until his death in 1846. Andrés Bello, first rector, defined the goals of the nascent faculty of laws and political sciences in his famous inauguration speech of the University of Chile in 1843:

To the faculty of laws and political sciences opens the widest, most susceptible, and most usefully applicable field. You have heard it: practical utility, positive results, social improvements are what the government mainly expects from the University; it is what should mainly recommend its work to the fatherland. Heirs to the legislation of the kingly people, we must purge it of the stains it acquired under the malefic influence of despotism; we must clear the incoherencies that tarnish a work to which so many centuries, so many alternately dominant interests, so many contradictory inspirations have contributed. We must adapt it, restore it to republican institutions. And what object could be more important or grander than the formation, the improvement of our organic laws, the upright and prompt administration of justice, the security of our rights, the faith of commercial transactions, the peace of the domestic hearth?

— Andrés Bello, Inauguration Speech of the University of Chile, 17 September 1843.

Although green had been designated the official color of law students in 1813, thirty years later a regulation established academic attire for deans and secretaries, assigning that color to the Faculty of Laws. In 1874 the faculty was represented in the university escutcheon with a balance held by a sword on a vert (green) background.

=== University Delegation, curricular changes and codification (1844–1879) ===
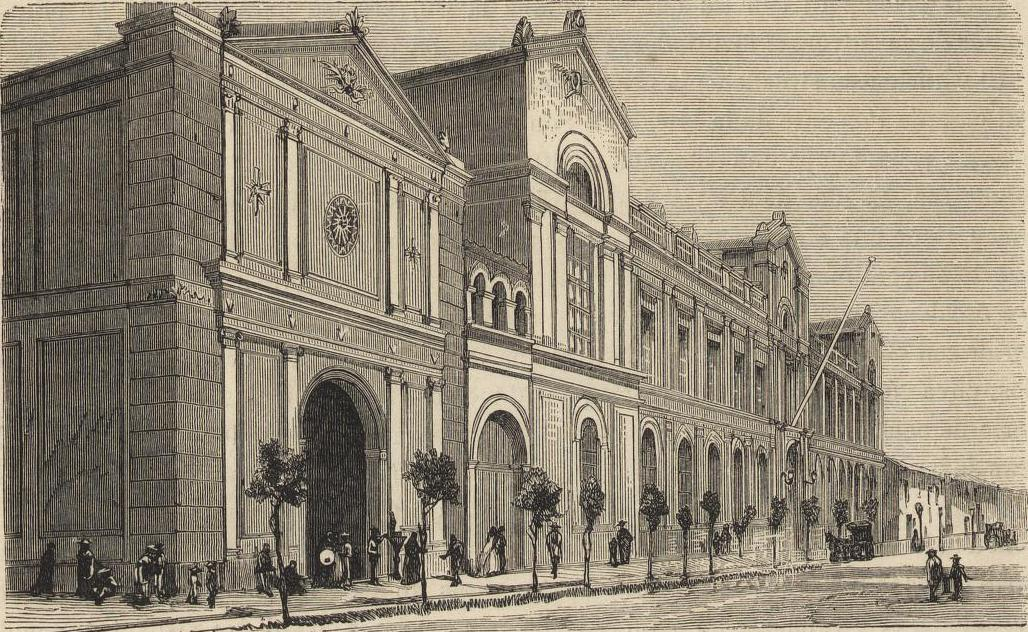
Casa Central, building of the faculty from the late 19th century until 1938.

In 1847 a new organization for university studies was established, implemented in 1852, dividing the National Institute into secondary and university sections. The latter came directly under the rector and University Council, headed by a university delegate.

In 1850 the Faculty of Laws and Political Sciences moved from the Bandera–Compañía building (where it had operated since 1819) to the National Institute building on the Alameda. Years later it moved to the Casa Central of the University of Chile, built between 1863 and 1872.

The curriculum was heavily criticized for being practice-oriented at the expense of branches of legal science such as Philosophy of Law and History of Law. Dean Juan Francisco Meneses, who took office in 1846, reinforced prevailing legal positivism with reforms eliminating the chairs of Universal Legislation and Political economy. Critics included Rafael Fernández Concha, José Victorino Lastarria, and rector Andrés Bello himself, as reflected in an 1853 speech:

The plan of legal studies, according to the University program, aims not only to provide the country with able jurisconsults, but also men capable of performing the high functions of administration and legislature, and of directing public opinion. Not only strictly legal sciences, but political and social sciences are levers of the university section, to which our law has given the title of Faculty of Laws and Political Sciences.

— Andrés Bello, 1853.

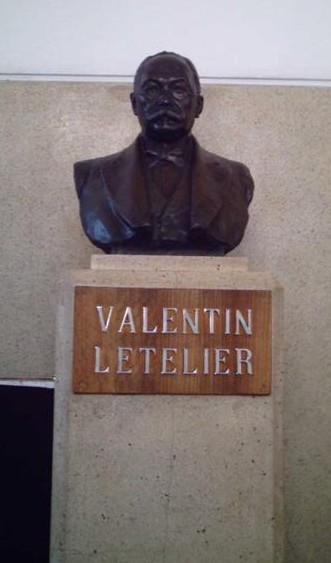
Bust of Valentín Letelier, rector of the University and professor at the Faculty.

In 1848 the Public Instruction Council established the order of studies, now with five subjects over four years. When the Academy of Forensic Practice was abolished in 1851, the corresponding two-year course was created.

The 1853 and 1859 curriculum reforms reached consensus, establishing a six-year program with chairs in Roman law, natural law, literature, law of nations, civil law (taught by Enrique Cood), canon law, commercial law, administrative law, political economy (taught by Jean Gustave Courcelle-Seneuil), civil procedure, mining law, criminal procedure and criminal law. In 1863 the program was reduced to five years.

The codification movement that emerged in Chile from the mid-19th century prompted further changes: in 1856 the Civil Code of Chile, drafted by Bello, was promulgated, forcing the faculty to replace Spanish law studies with the Code, formalized by decree on 20 March the following year. In 1875 the Penal and Mining Codes were enacted, leading to reformulation of the criminal law and mining ordinance chairs. The same occurred with subsequent legal codes.

=== Development of the Faculty's teaching role (1879–1920) ===
The Secondary and Higher Education Act of 1879 restored the University of Chile's permanent educational role. By that year the Faculty of Laws had 319 students, nearly 45% of the university's total, a figure that continued to rise: in 1908 it had 466 law students and by 1918 already 821.

Late in the 19th century, the faculty graduated the first women to obtain law degrees under the 1877 Amunátegui Decree: Matilde Throup and Matilde Brandau, in 1892 and 1898 respectively.

Legal studies underwent substantial reform in 1902, shifting from an exegesis approach to a systematic or scientific method. The original chairs of Roman law and canons were reformed: the former shifted from legal to historical focus, while the latter was simply eliminated; some professors argue it was effectively transformed into the General History of Law course. Later, the first seminars emerged: in 1917 the economic sciences seminar, and in 1919 those of public and private law.

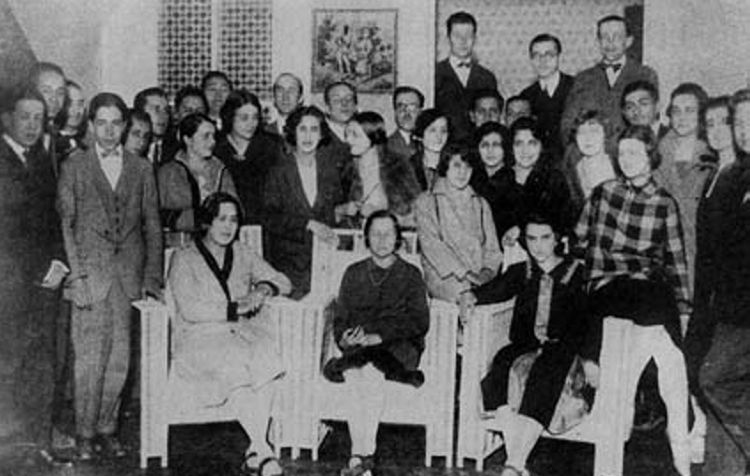
Law students in 1926; seated center is activist Elena Caffarena.

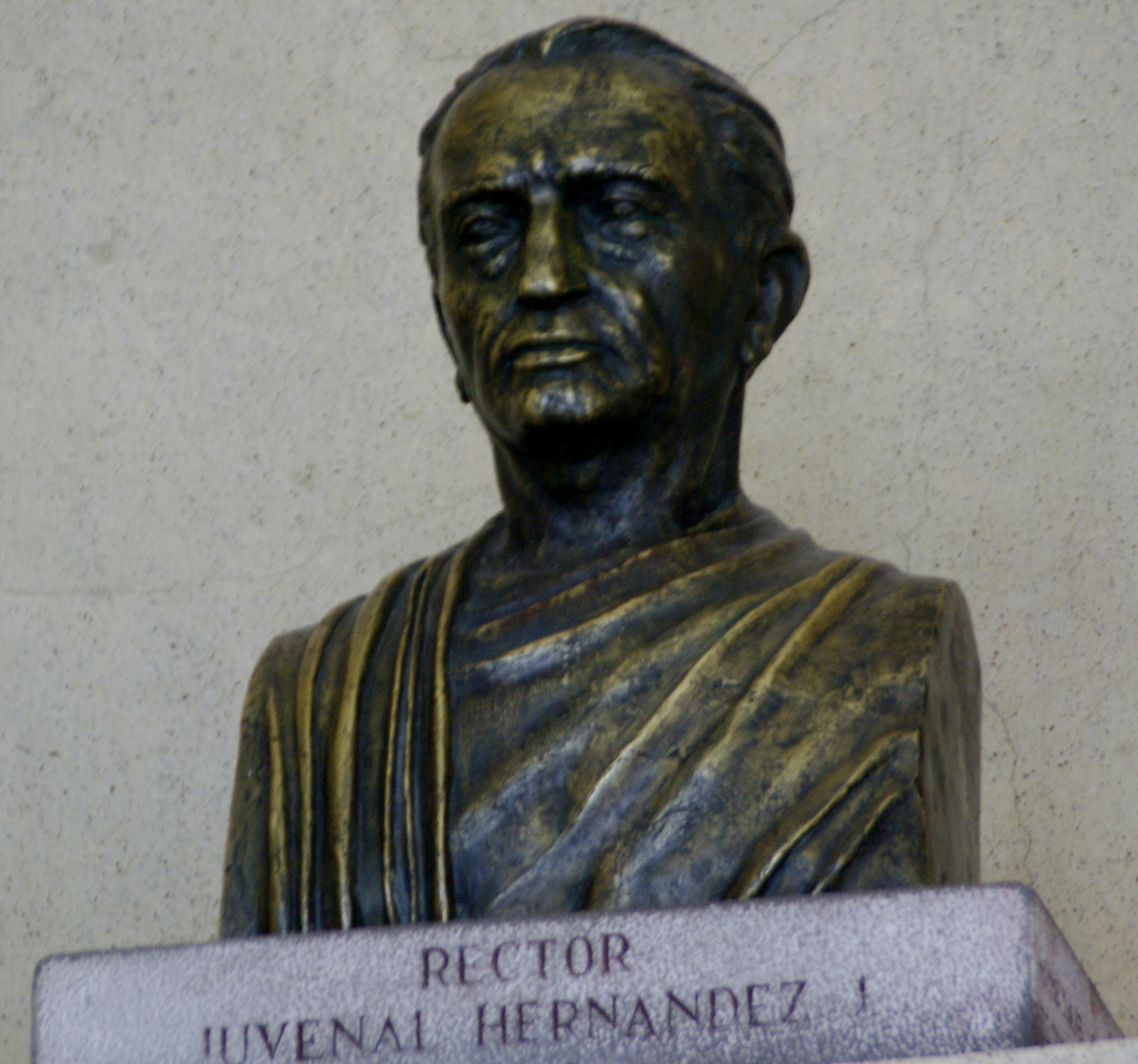
Bust of Juvenal Hernández Jaque, dean and rector, by sculptor Raúl Vargas.

=== Years of upheaval and Juvenal Hernández Jaque's rectorship (1920–1953) ===
The 1920s were marked by the rise of student social movements under the Federation of Students of the University of Chile (FECh, founded 1906), including defense of women's rights promoted by activist Elena Caffarena and movements for working classes such as the Universidad Popular Lastarria, which bequeathed the Legal Clinics to the faculty. The following decade, critical student views were reflected in the literary and political avant-garde magazine Mástil (first issue 1929), featuring contributors such as Oreste Plath and Mariano Latorre, and the Avance university group gathering left-wing sympathizers.

Juvenal Hernández Jaque, professor of social sciences, was elected dean in 1931 but resigned on 2 July 1932, returning quickly in August. He resigned definitively in 1933 upon being elected interim rector to fill the vacancy left by Pedro Godoy Perrín, later confirmed by the university senate.

Conditions at the faculty at the start of Hernández's rectorship were poor; in 1934 Dean Arturo Alessandri Rodríguez began managing a new location for the Law School, selecting land beside the Mapocho River at the current intersection of Pío Nono and Santa María. The building—designed by architect Juan Martínez Gutiérrez, characterized by Art Deco and monumentalist constructions also seen in his other works such as the Bernardo O'Higgins Military School, Votive Temple of Maipú and Faculty of Medicine, University of Chile of the same university—is considered one of Chile's most important architectural works of the first half of the 20th century:

The curved façade, more than a standout feature of the building, is a highly significant element in the face of the city. Its total volume, viewed as architectural sculpture, adorns the metropolis... The Law School has the merits of a national monument.

— Guillermo Ulriksen, architect.

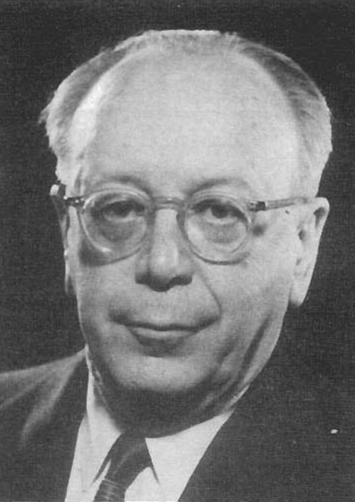
Arturo Alessandri Rodríguez, dean 1933–1943.

Legal studies were also modified by the 1934 Regulations, expanding seminars to five by adding "commercial and industrial law" and "criminal law and forensic medicine" to the existing three (economic sciences, public law, and private law). That year the Institute of Criminal Sciences began operating.

In 1934 the Faculty consolidated a rigid curriculum that lasted until 1966, only to be reimposed in 1975. This reform promoted an exacerbated positivist rigor in legal education, combined with a rigid curriculum lacking specialization under expository teaching methods that demanded great memorization effort from students alongside the absence of research programs.

— Gonzalo Figueroa Yáñez, 1976

The Editorial Jurídica de Chile was founded in 1945 as a partnership between the faculty and the Library of Congress of Chile. Two years later it gained legal personality through Law No. 8737; that same year (1947) a new regulation was approved that, among other things, introduced enrollment control, gave the program a more practical character, and created three-year short programs for those not seeking the lawyer title.

=== Gómez Millas rectorship, Valparaíso campus and reform attempts (1953–1973) ===
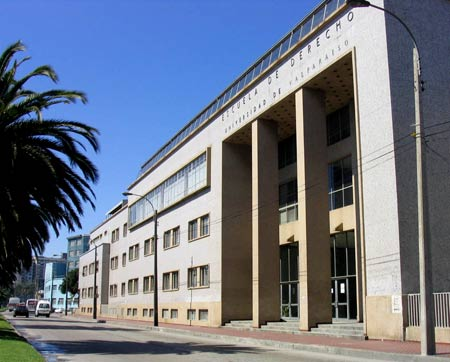
Law School of Valparaíso in 1977 (when under University of Chile) and 2010 (after becoming part of University of Valparaíso).

Juan Gómez Millas, professor of social sciences, was elected rector in 1953, ushering in a period of major advances for the University of Chile, including expansion to other regions through Regional Colleges and establishment of the Valparaíso campus.

This expansion linked the Santiago Law School with its Valparaíso counterpart, dating to 1911 when the Fiscal Law Course was established there. During its administration by the University of Chile, that school had professors such as civilists Ramón Meza Barros and Victorio Pescio, proceduralist Mario Casarino Viterbo, and Carlos León Alvarado. In 1972 it officially became the Faculty of Law and Social Sciences of the University of Chile (Valparaíso campus). In addition to these, the faculty oversaw two other programs: Social Work (also taught in both cities) and Political and Administrative Sciences.

Meanwhile, the Santiago Law School faced new challenges under Gómez Millas's rectorship with the creation of institutions such as the Institute of Political and Administrative Sciences (1954), the Centers for Criminological and Documentary Research (1957 and 1958), and the Center for Comparative American Law Studies (1962). The faculty also participated in international seminars, such as the VIII Congress of the International Association of Penal Law in Lisbon in 1961, with professors Arturo Alessandri Rodríguez and Eduardo Novoa Monreal, plus assistant Antonio Bascuñán Valdés.

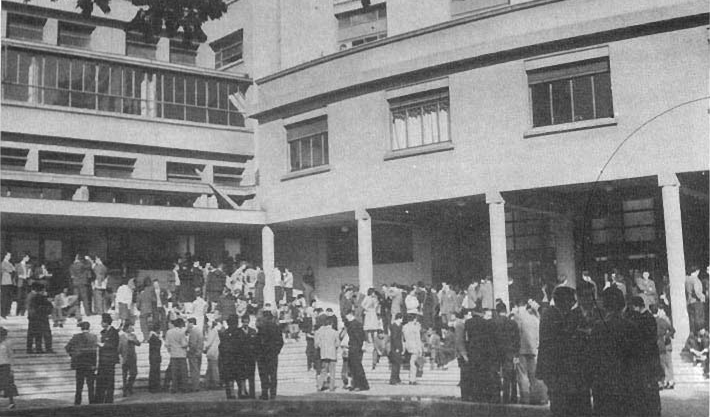
Santiago Law School courtyard.

In 1963 Gómez Millas's fruitful rectorship ended, and from 1967 the university reform movement began nationwide. The Faculty of Legal Sciences was not exempt, and in 1968 a plebiscite was held to approve continuation of Professor Eugenio Velasco Letelier (who had taken office in 1965) as dean, with faculty, assistants, and eligible students voting; the result favored him.

On 20 October 1971 the faculty building was occupied in response to a University Superior Normative Council decision proposing merger of the Law School with other faculties under the name Faculty of Legal, Economic and Social Sciences. The mobilization was supported by professors opposed to Salvador Allende's socialist Popular Unity government.

At this moment an aberration appears: suppressing the Faculty of Law, which exists as such in almost every country in the world, socialist or capitalist. They exist in Moscow, Beijing and Havana. Every university of any standing has a faculty of that character.

— Secretary of the Lawyer Career Studies, 1971.

The occupation became violent due to intervention by the nationalist paramilitary group Patria y Libertad, including incidents such as the 26 November attack on the car carrying the then Minister of the Interior José Tohá. By late 1971 Velasco retired, and in 1972 Máximo Pacheco Gómez, Christian Democrat militant and former collaborator of Eduardo Frei Montalva's government, assumed office.

=== Crisis during the military dictatorship (1973–1990) ===
The 1973 Chilean coup d'état against Salvador Allende's socialist government marked the beginning of the military dictatorship led by a junta headed by General Augusto Pinochet. The entire university administration was intervened, including persecution of students; emblematic cases include the execution of Patricio Munita in December 1973, and the disappearances of Ismael Chávez and Cecilia Castro Salvadores. Late in 1973 a summary investigation led by Miguel Otero Lathrop targeted various professors and students for their political ideas, including then-president of the Law Students' Center Álvaro Varela, expelled from the university for his membership in the MAPU.

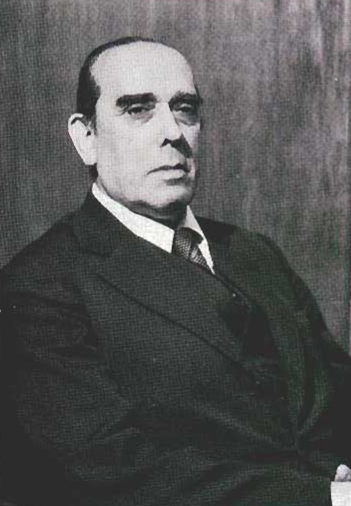
Hugo Rosende Subiabre, appointed dean (1976–1983)

In 1974 Antonio Bascuñán Valdés assumed the deanship and attempted reforms such as departmental structure, flexible curriculum, semester system, credit system, etc., which did not materialize due to a new administration two years later led by Hugo Rosende Subiabre. He implemented repression and dismissed several professors, including Francisco Cumplido and Máximo Pacheco Gómez, as his policy sought to remove both former Popular Unity sympathizers and Christian Democrats from the faculty. Rosende favored counter-reform eliminating social science studies, directing the curriculum toward rigid legal positivism as imposed in 1934, changes reflected in the new name Faculty of Law, which it retains today.

Despite this, the faculty remained a space for debate within rigid limits through lectures on public and international public law and participation in seminars such as the Constitutional Reform Bill. In 1981 Decree Law No. 1 created regional universities from University of Chile and State Technical University campuses, so the Valparaíso Law School separated from Santiago and became part of the new University of Valparaíso. Rosende's deanship ended in 1983—succeeded by Avelino León Hurtado—and the following year he was appointed Minister of Justice under Pinochet. Subsequently, Rafael Eyzaguirre Echeverría (1984) and Mario Mosquera (1986) served as deans.

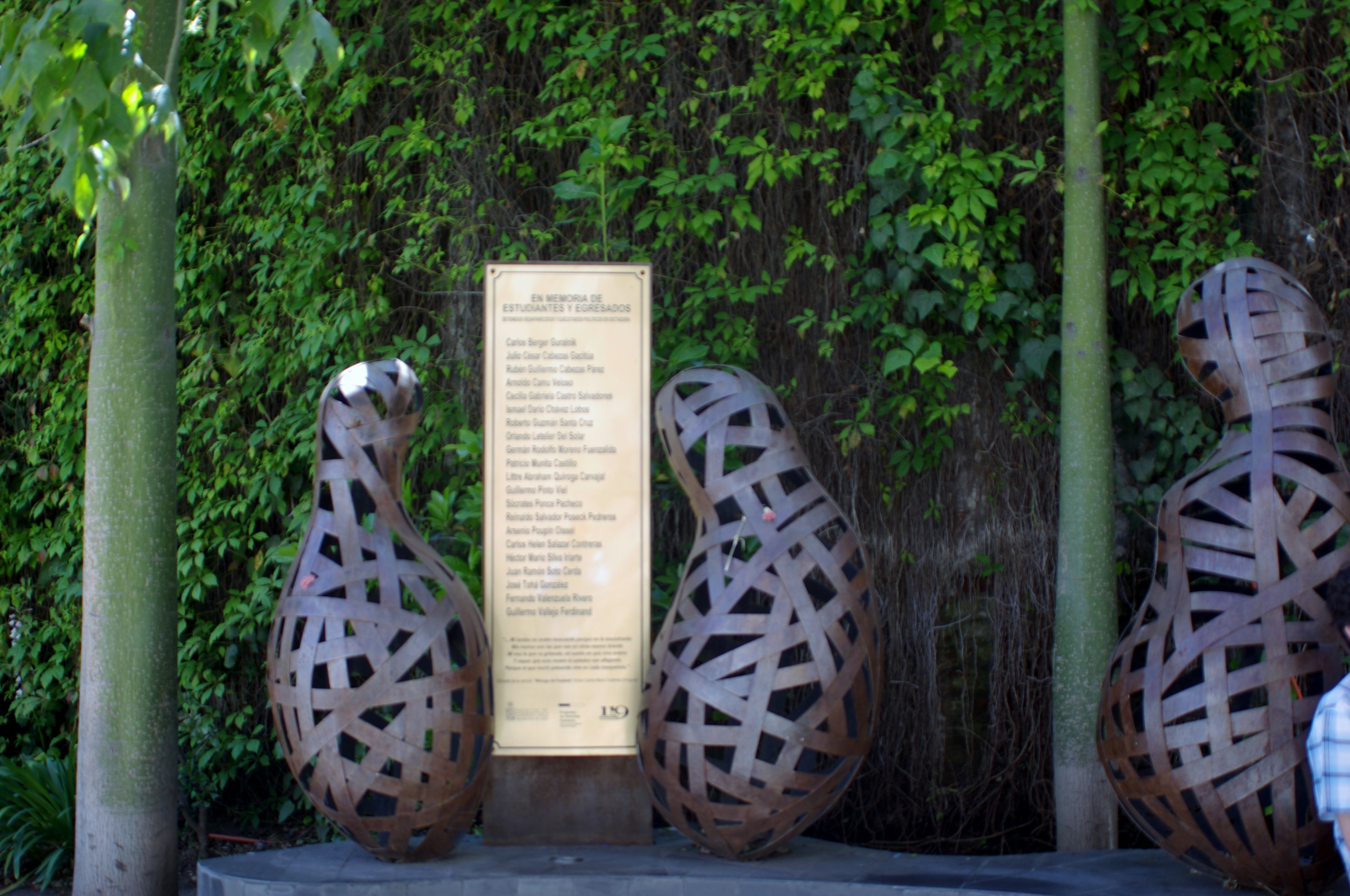
Memorial to students and alumni victims of the military dictatorship

In 1987 student discontent erupted against appointed university rector José Luis Federici, manifesting in a general strike joined by law students. Federici responded harshly to students' refusal to return to classes, dismissing Dean Mosquera in early October 1987 and appointing Jorge Hübner—a known Pinochetist—as acting dean. Students rejected Hübner by evicting and vandalizing his office. On 29 October Pinochet dismissed Federici and appointed Juan de Dios Vial Larraín rector. Subsequently Juan Colombo assumed the deanship.

=== Decades of student mobilizations (1990–present) ===
In 1990 Mario Mosquera again assumed the deanship and was reelected four years later, but resigned on 1 April 1997, leaving civilist Francisco Merino Scheihing as acting dean. Professor Pablo Rodríguez Grez—former leader of nationalist movement Patria y Libertad (which fought against Popular Unity) and collaborator of General Pinochet—was proposed as new dean. However, a center-left student group led by Students' Center president socialist Claudio Márquez opposed it on 22 April 1997, leading to occupation of the faculty lasting one week; two days into it Rodríguez resigned both his candidacy and from the university. Along with Rodríguez's departure, students demanded comprehensive curriculum reform dating from 1934 and interrupted by Hugo Rosende Subiabre's counter-reform. Along with Rodríguez, several other conservative professors left the University of Chile (Eduardo Soto Kloss, Ramiro Mendoza Zúñiga, and Ángela Cattan) , most moving to private universities.

After instability in faculty leadership, Antonio Bascuñán Valdés assumed the deanship again in 1998, initiating the process leading to curriculum reform assigned to the Maturana Commission, led by proceduralist Cristián Maturana. The commission proposed semesterization, written final exams, and curriculum flexibility, including controversial elimination of mandatory Roman law, changes introduced in 2002. That same year a faculty occupation occurred amid a crisis in university-wide Student Welfare services, costing Dean Bascuñán support among faculty and contributing to his narrow defeat by Roberto Nahum the following year.

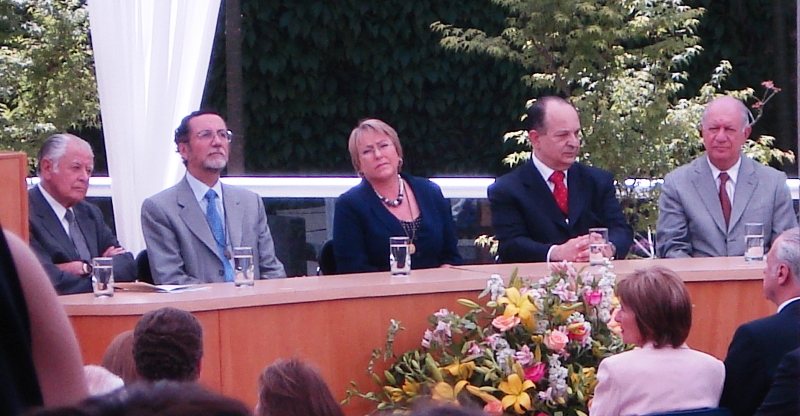
Inauguration ceremony of the Presidents' Building in 2007.

On 5 November 2007 the Presidents' Building (nicknamed Nahum Tower) was inaugurated in the north wing, containing undergraduate and graduate classrooms, a cafeteria, and parking. On 29 April 2009 a new student conflict erupted led by the Students' Center (CED), then presided by Gabriel Boric, amid plagiarism accusations against Dean Nahum and demands for reform including regularization of the academic senate, implementation of new university statutes to promote internal democracy, and participatory Institutional Development Plan (PDI) elaboration. That day, after a student referendum supporting the CED petition, a group of students occupied the faculty, lasting six weeks until Nahum's resignation on 17 June. On 9 June penalist Luis Ortiz Quiroga was appointed acting vice-dean, later becoming acting dean.

The following year Nahum ran again for dean, defeating jurist Cecilia Medina in the 10 June election with 58% of votes. In 2012 the faculty inaugurated new premises for the Graduate School and Legal Clinics at 076 Santa María Avenue.

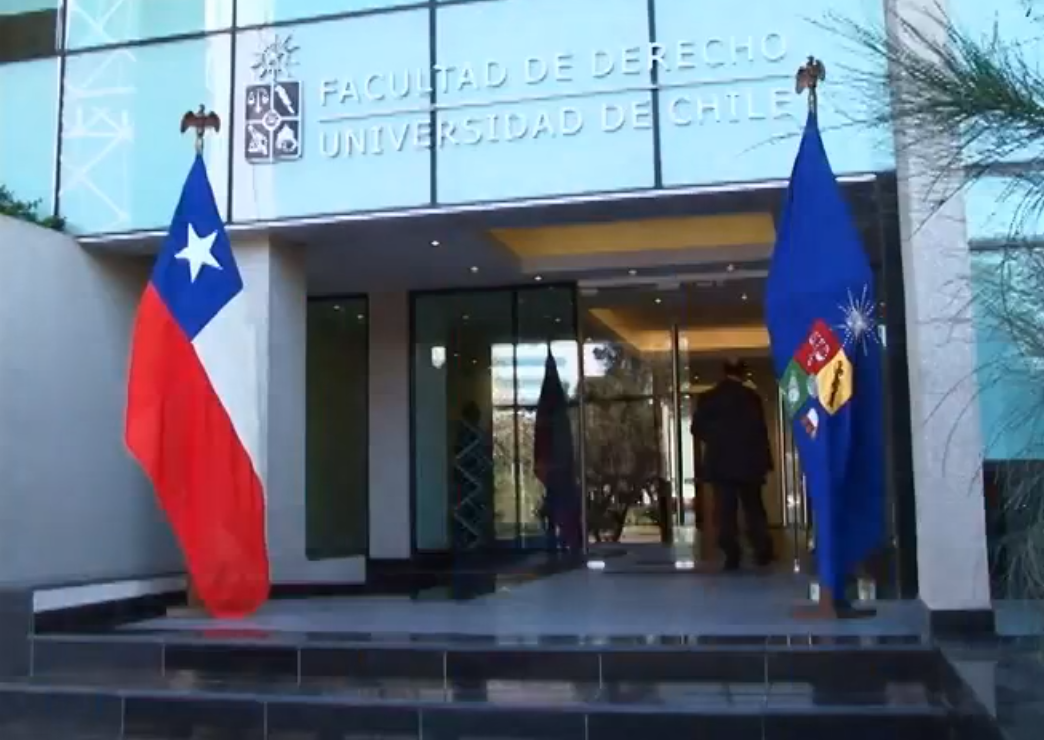
Legal Clinics and Graduate Studies building.

Mid-2014 Nahum attempted a third consecutive candidacy, but professors and students challenged it before the Junta Electoral Central of the University of Chile, which rejected it by five votes to one initially and four to two on review. Nahum claimed interruption of his term during the 2009 occupation, but arguments were rejected as article 36(5) of the University of Chile Organic Statute prohibits titular professors from running for more than two consecutive terms regardless of interruption. After two rejections Nahum unsuccessfully appealed to the Metropolitan Regional Electoral Tribunal (TER) and Constitutional Court (though TER accepted it, the Constitutional Court ruled for the university), definitively barring his participation and paving the way for Professor Davor Harasic's victory the following year.

Late 2014 a memorial to faculty students and alumni victims of the Pinochet regime was inaugurated. Located in the courtyard, it consists of two figures and a plaque listing 21 names alphabetically: Carlos Berger Guralnik, Julio César Cabezas Gacitúa, Rubén Guillermo Cabezas Pérez, Arnoldo Camú Veloso, Cecilia Gabriela Castro Salvadores, Ismael Darío Chávez Lobos, Roberto Guzmán Santa Cruz, Orlando Letelier del Solar, Germán Rodolfo Moreno Fuenzalida, Patricio Munita Castillo, Guillermo Pinto Viel, Sócrates Ponce Pacheco, Reinaldo Salvador Poseck Pedreros, Arsenio Poupin Oissel, Littré Abraham Quiroga Carvajal, Carlos Helen Salazar Contreras, Héctor Mario Silva Iriarte, Juan Ramón Soto Cerda, José Tohá González, Fernando Valenzuela Rivero, and Guillermo Vallejos Ferdinand.

In 2015 another occupation occurred due to expulsion of 31 students, resolved immediately, though reintegration of dismissed cleaners remained unresolved. The following year, on 27 April, another conflict erupted over arbitrary expulsions; the student assembly approved occupation with 55.5% of valid votes, ratified at 60.38% on 28 April, 62.25% on 3 May, and 56.38% on 6 May.

The main faculty building was declared a National Monument of Chile in March 2014.

== Administration ==
According to University of Chile statutes, the highest authority within the faculty is the dean—must be a full professor and serves four years, eligible for one consecutive reelection—whose functions are "to direct it within the university policies determined by the superior organs indicated."

There is also a Faculty Council, which "shall define academic and institutional development policies within the guidelines and strategies issued by the University Senate." It comprises the dean (chair), department/school/institute/center directors, and other appointed academics.

=== List of deans ===
No official list of deans exists. The following, based on Anales de la Facultad and other sources, may have inaccuracies or omissions, especially regarding interim or acting deans.

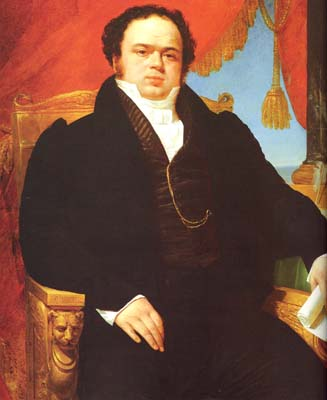
Mariano Egaña, first dean, 1843–1846

Period	Dean
1843–1846	Mariano Egaña Fabres
1846–1860	Juan Francisco Meneses
1860–1863	José Gabriel Palma
1863–1869	Manuel Camilo Vial
1869–1882	Gabriel Ocampo
1882–1884	Cosme Campillo Ibáñez
1884–1888	José Clemente Fabres
1888–1894	José María Barceló
1894–1912	Miguel Antonio Varas
1912–1914	Leopoldo Urrutia Anguita
1914–1924	Ruperto Bahamonde Rivera
1924–1927	Arturo Alessandri Rodríguez
1927	José Guillermo Guerra
1927–1930	Juan Antonio Iribarren
1930–1931	Agustín Vigorena Ramírez
1931–1932	Juvenal Hernández Jaque
1932	José Guillermo Guerra
1932–1933	Juvenal Hernández Jaque
1933–1943	Arturo Alessandri Rodríguez
1944	José Raimundo del Río Castillo
1944–1945	Juan Antonio Iribarren
1946	Rafael Correa Fuenzalida
1946–1951?	José Raimundo del Río Castillo
?1951–1955	Darío Benavente Gorroño
1955–1956	José Raimundo del Río Castillo
1957–1965	Darío Benavente Gorroño
1965–1971	Eugenio Velasco Letelier
1972–1974	Máximo Pacheco Gómez
1974–1976	Antonio Bascuñán Valdés
1976–1983	Hugo Rosende Subiabre
1983–1984	Avelino León Hurtado
1984–1986	Rafael Eyzaguirre Echeverría
1986–1987	Mario Mosquera Ruiz
1987	Jorge Hübner (acting)
1987–1990	Juan Colombo Campbell
1990–1997	Mario Mosquera Ruiz
1997–1998	Roberto Nahum Anuch (acting)
1998	Avelino León Steffens (acting)
1998–2002	Antonio Bascuñán Valdés
2002–2009	Roberto Nahum Anuch
2009–2010	Luis Ortiz Quiroga (acting)
2010–2014	Roberto Nahum Anuch
2014–2015	Pierino Perazzo Gagliardo (acting)
2015–2018	Davor Harasic Yaksic
2018	Claudio Moraga Klenner (acting)
2018–present	Pablo Ruiz-Tagle Vial

== Curriculum ==
=== Undergraduate ===
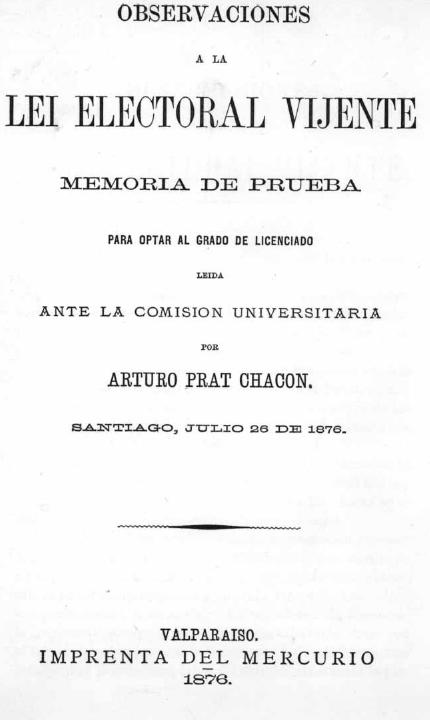
Arturo Prat's degree thesis (licentiate dissertation), an alumnus of the faculty.

The faculty offers a flexible curriculum in which students apply for courses and professors, subject to academic programming conditions. Courses are classified as mandatory, optional, elective, and free. The first two grant 6 credits each, the latter two 4 credits. To graduate, a minimum of 340 credits must be completed: 220 for 38 mandatory courses, 24 for 4 optional courses, 66 for electives, 16 for 4 free courses, 16 for 2 thesis workshops, and 16 for 2 legal clinics. The maximum duration is eight years.

To obtain the degree of Licentiate in Legal and Social Sciences, students must complete a degree thesis and pass an oral, solemn licensing examination. This fulfills one requirement of article 535 of the Organic Code of Courts to obtain the title of lawyer. Per article 521 of the same Code, the title is granted in public hearing by the Supreme Court of Chile after six months' professional practice at the Corporación de Asistencia Judicial.

Mandatory courses include:

Department	Mandatory courses	Department	Mandatory courses
Legal Sciences	History of Law (I & II); Introduction to Law (I & II); Moral Philosophy; Legal Profession	Economic Law	Microeconomics; Macroeconomics; Economic Law; Tax Law
Criminal Sciences	Criminal Law (I, II & III)	Procedural Law	Procedural Law (I, II, III, IV, V)
Private Law	Civil Law (I–VII)	Commercial Law	Commercial Law (I, II & III)
Public Law	Constitutional Law (I, II & III); Administrative Law; State Liability	International Law	Public International Law; Private International Law
Labor & Social Security Law	Labor Law (I & II); Social Security Law	Clinical Legal Education	Legal Clinic I Optional Clinic

=== Graduate ===
The faculty offers various graduate programs, notably its Doctor of Laws program comprising two cycles—qualifying and doctoral—including courses, seminars, tutorials, qualifying examination, thesis, and degree examination.

It also offers various master's degrees, diplomas, and training courses, both in Santiago and other Chilean cities.

=== Exchange programs ===
- Asia:
  - China Tsinghua University
  - South Korea Yonsei University
  - Iran University of Tehran
  - Jordan University of Jordan
  - Syria Damascus University
- Europe:
  - Germany University of Bonn
  - Germany University of Freiburg
  - Germany Leibniz University Hannover
  - Germany Heidelberg University
  - Germany Humboldt University of Berlin
  - Denmark University of Copenhagen
  - Spain University of Barcelona
  - Spain Carlos III University of Madrid
  - Spain University of Girona
  - Spain University of Las Palmas de Gran Canaria
  - Spain University of Murcia
  - Spain Rovira i Virgili University
  - Spain University of Valencia
  - Spain Ortega y Gasset University Research Institute
  - Finland University of Lapland
  - France Paris 1 Panthéon-Sorbonne University
  - France Paris 2 Panthéon-Assas University
  - Netherlands Utrecht University
  - Italy University of Milan
  - Sweden Stockholm University
  - Switzerland University of Geneva
- Latin America:
  - Argentina University of Buenos Aires
  - Argentina National University of Córdoba
  - Brazil University of Brasília
  - Brazil Federal University of Rio Grande do Sul
  - Colombia Universidad del Rosario
  - Colombia Externado University of Colombia
  - Costa Rica University of Costa Rica
  - Mexico Autonomous University of Nuevo León
  - Mexico University of Guadalajara
  - Mexico National Autonomous University of Mexico
  - Mexico Monterrey Institute of Technology
  - Paraguay National University of Asunción
- North America:
  - Canada Université du Québec à Montréal
  - Canada University of Ottawa
  - United States American University
  - United States University of California, Davis
  - United States University of Denver
  - United States Harvard University
  - United States Cornell University
  - United States University of Maryland
  - United States University of San Francisco
  - United States Yale University
  - United States National Center for Inter-American Free Trade Law
  - Puerto Rico University of Puerto Rico
- International organizations:
  - Inter-American Court of Human Rights
  - General Secretariat of the Latin American Integration Association

== Library ==
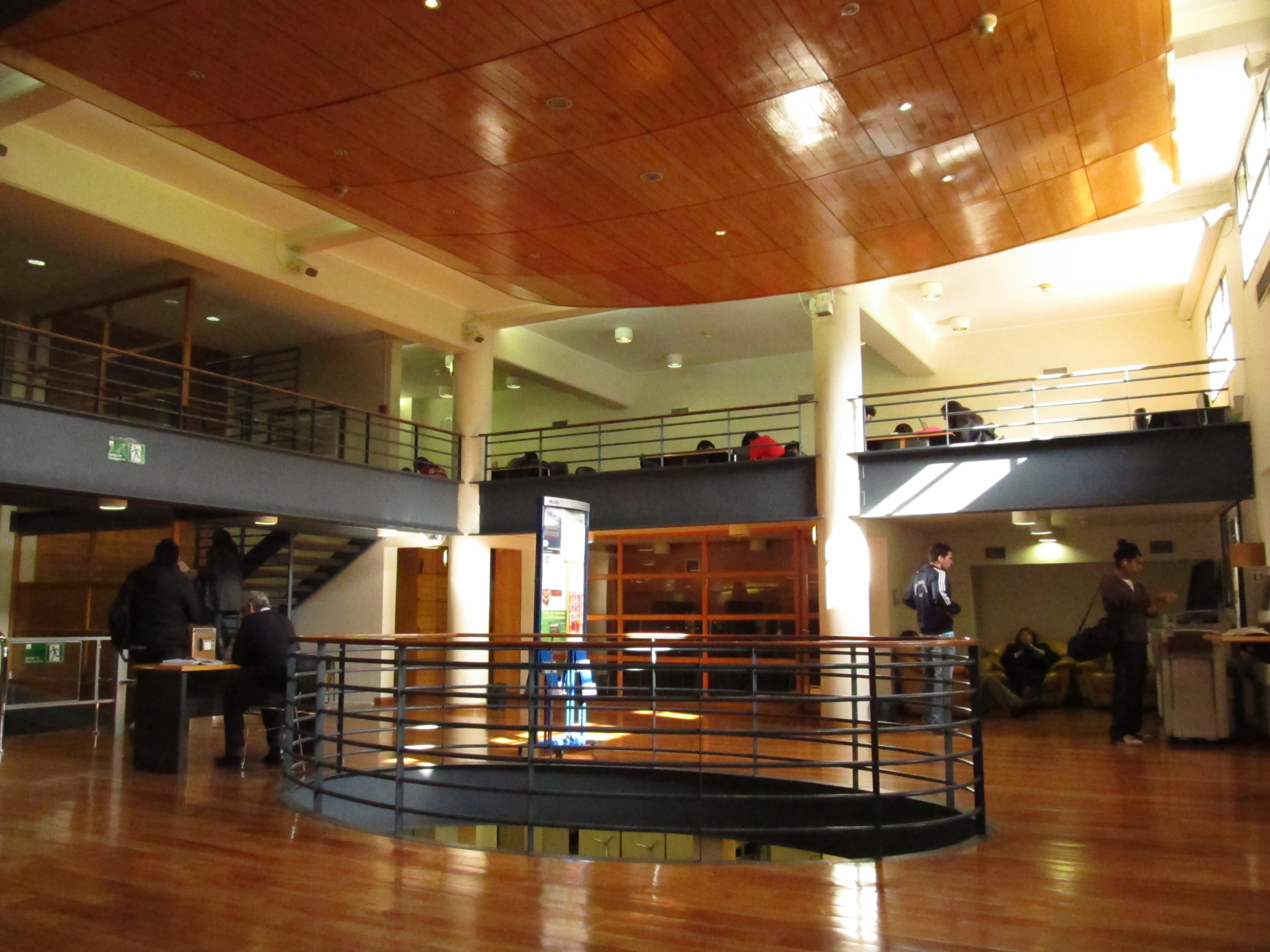
Central Library of the Faculty of Law of the University of Chile.

The Central Library has operated in its current location since 1938 when the school moved from the Casa Central to the Pío Nono building. Facilities were remodeled in 1995, creating a main library with three levels accommodating nearly 300 students, study spaces, computer access, and facilities for visually impaired students.

Access requires the TUI (Smart University Card). Book availability depends on collection type:

- General collection: basic bibliography
- Reserve collection: high-demand documents with controlled loans
- Reference collection: quick-reference materials (dictionaries, encyclopedias, videos, slides)
- Thesis collection: original degree theses
- Periodicals: journals, yearbooks, etc.
- Historical collection: ancient high-value documents with restricted access

Notable theses include those by activist Elena Caffarena Morice and former president Ricardo Lagos Escobar. The historical collection includes Bello's Civil Code Draft (1855) with annotations by Gabriel Ocampo.

The Marcial Martínez Library, located in the Santa María building basement, serves graduate students and holds high-value documents from personal libraries of Marcial Martínez Cuadros, Alamiro de Ávila, Benjamín Cid, and Máximo Pacheco Gómez, plus the thesis collection.

== Outreach and research ==
The University of Chile emphasizes research across disciplines, ranking it first in intellectual output in the country. The Faculty has promoted legal science research and dissemination through permanent initiatives.

In 2004 the General Research Coordination Unit was established to create information and project management opportunities and train faculty human resources. However, students have recently criticized scarce research opportunities, one reason for the 2009 occupation.

=== Research centers ===
Five specialized centers exist:

- Center for Justice Studies (CEJ)
- Center for Environmental Law (CDA)
- Center for Human Rights (CDH)
- Center for Law, Technology and Society Studies (CE3)
- Center for Regulation and Competition (REGCOM)

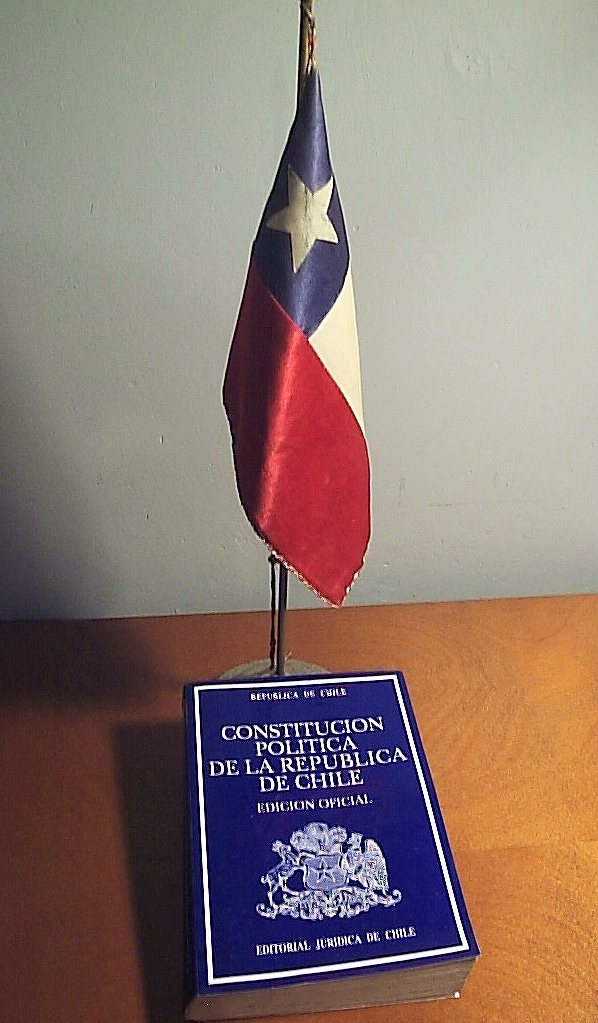
1980 Constitution, Editorial Jurídica edition.

=== Editorial Jurídica de Chile ===
The Editorial Jurídica de Chile, also known as Editorial Andrés Bello, is a public law corporation founded in 1945 through an agreement between the faculty and the Library of Congress of Chile.

The dean serves as president of the Editorial, while the rest of the Board comprises the Comptroller General of the Republic, a Supreme Court representative, a Council of Rectors representative, the president of the Chilean Bar Association, the director of the Library of Congress, and two presidential appointees—one from the Ministry of Justice and Human Rights and one from the Ministry of Education.

It holds exclusive rights to publish official Chilean codes, as well as doctrinal works and jurisprudence, including the Revista de Derecho y Jurisprudencia y Gaceta de los Tribunales, existing since 1903 on initiative of Eliodoro Yáñez and Luis Claro Solar. It maintains a branch inside the Faculty of Law in the Presidents' Building.

=== Publications ===
The faculty produces several publications covering various legal fields, including:

- Anales de la Facultad (1935–1972, 2004–)
- Revista Chilena de Historia del Derecho (1959–)
- Revista de Derecho Público (1963–)
- Revista de Derecho Procesal (1971–)
- Revista Derecho y Humanidades (1991–)
- Revista de Estudios de la Justicia (2002–)
- Revista Chilena de Derecho Informático (2002–2006)
- Revista de Derecho Ambiental (2003–)
- Anuario de los Derechos Humanos (2005–)
- Revista Chilena de Derecho y Tecnología (2012–)
- "Doctoral Program Publications" series

== Students' Center ==
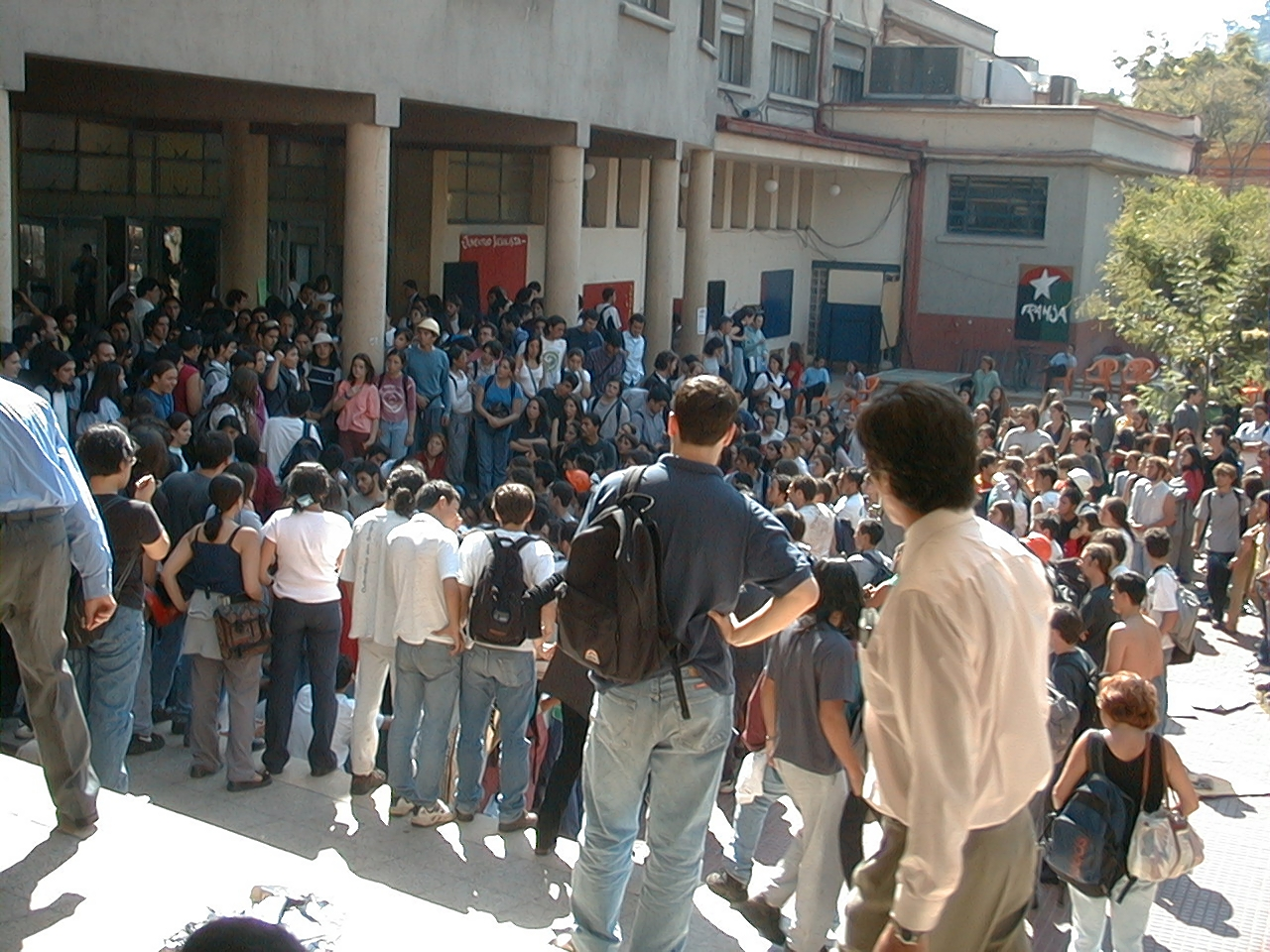
Students in the faculty courtyard in 2000.

Students are represented by the Law Students' Center (CED), affiliated with the Federation of Students of the University of Chile (FECh). It is organized with an executive board and Representatives' Council, both elected annually by universal student suffrage. The board has seven positions: president (representing students before university authorities and leading political direction), vice president, general secretary, welfare secretary, outreach secretary, communications secretary, and finance secretary, plus presidential appointees.

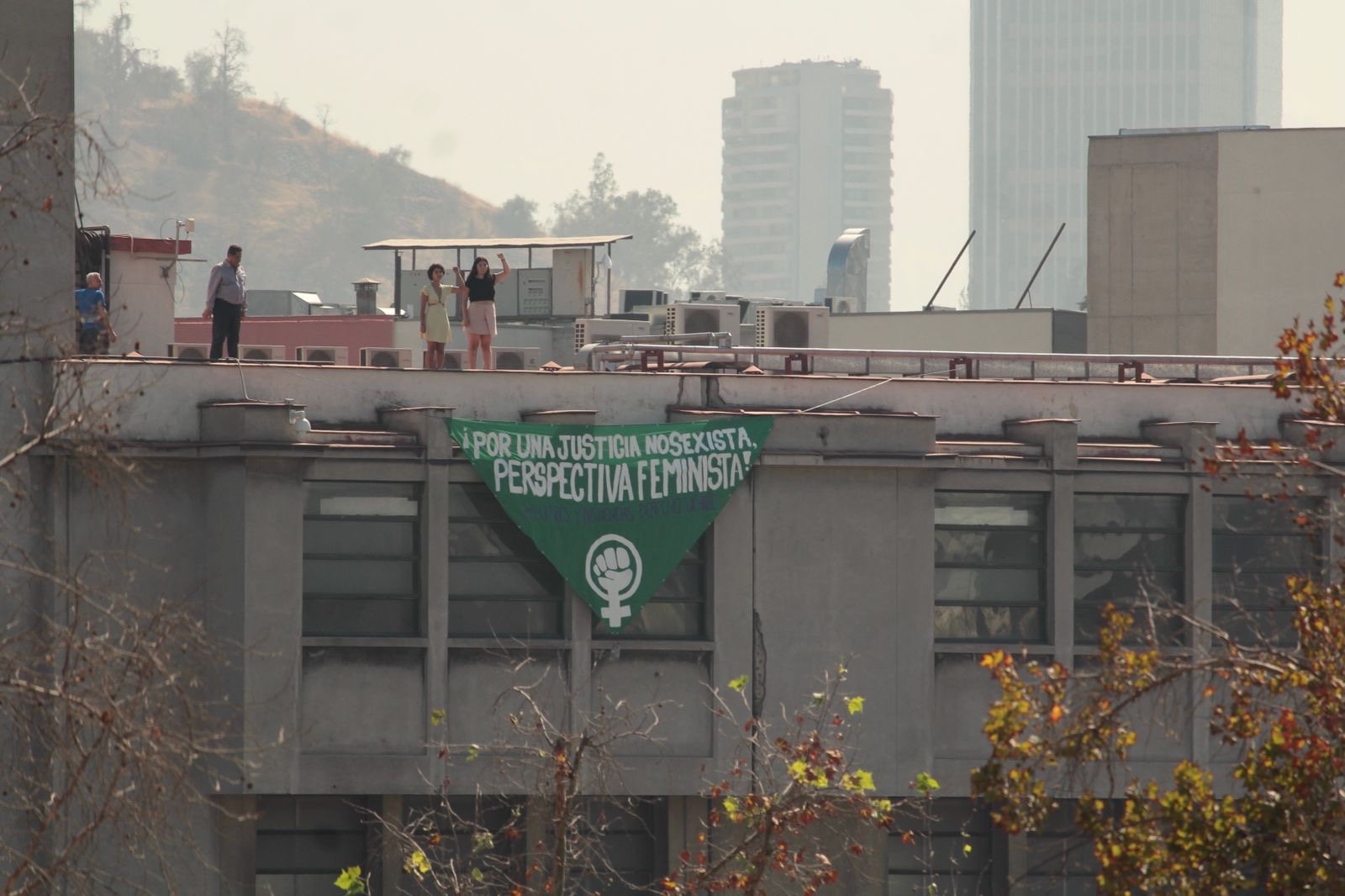
Students protesting on International Women's Day at the Faculty, March 8, 2023.

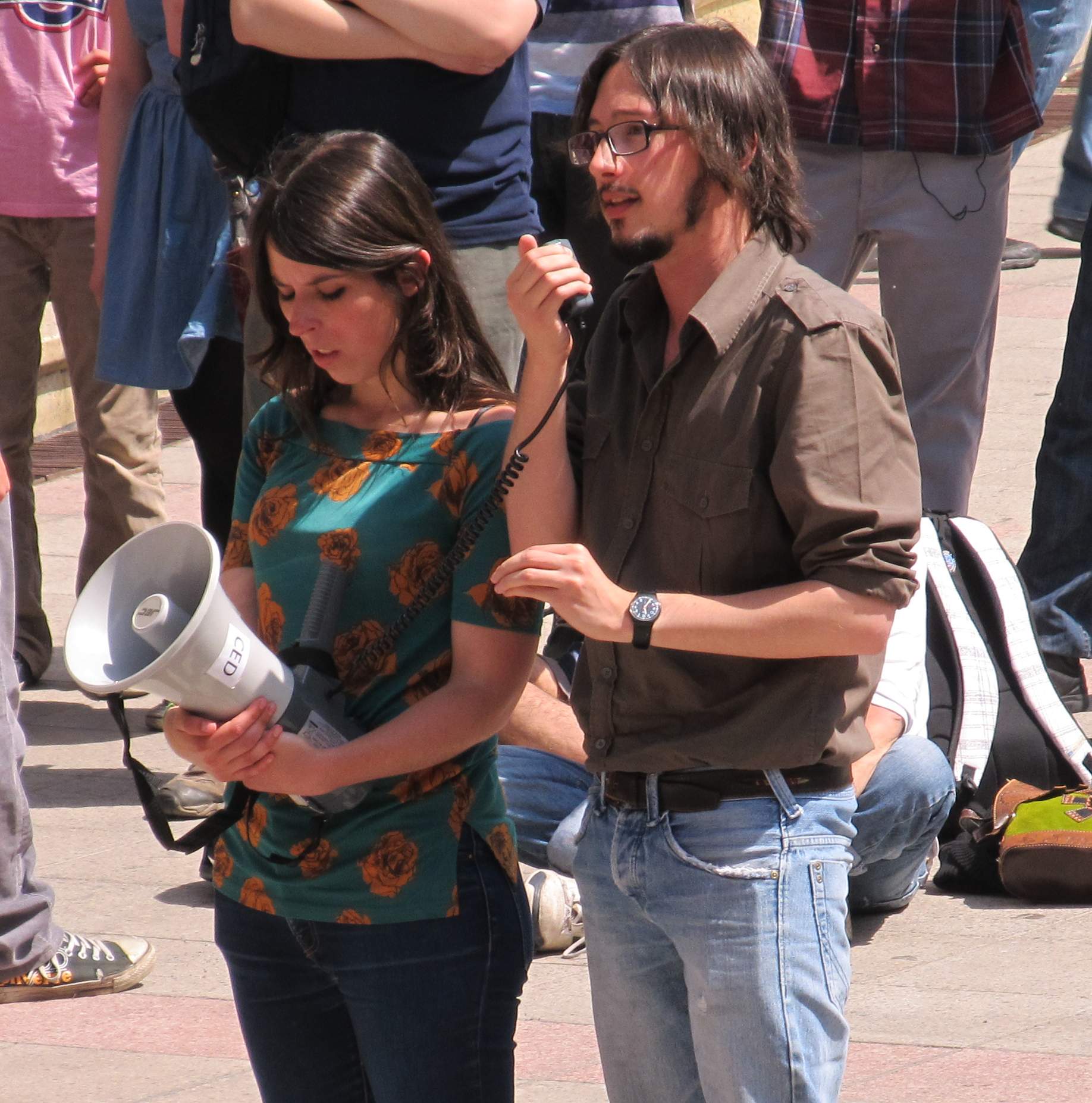
Constanza Martínez, CED president 2010-2011, with Francisco Figueroa, FECh vice president during the same period.

The Council of Representatives (CDR) meets periodically. Its members are elected by universal suffrage in a mixed manner, some by each class year and others transversally. It is an essentially deliberative body where the position of the Student Center is defined on university issues and often on national politics.

There are class-year assemblies, composed of all members of the class year, who elect their representatives (delegates) once a year and meet to organize annual events and deliberate on course problems, the university situation, or eventually national issues.

The highest decision-making body is the General Student Assembly, composed of all enrolled students in the Faculty. It meets only extraordinarily and operates by voting quorum.

=== Presidents ===
Throughout its history, the CED has been led by prominent figures in national politics, including Ricardo Lagos, José Miguel Insulza, Alberto Espina, Andrés Allamand and Jorge Arrate (1962). However, its chronology has been almost a mystery, as a complete list including its entire history has not been achieved. Below is a list of presidents of the Centro de Estudiantes de Derecho since 1983, the year in which the student organization of the University of Chile was reestablished during the military regime, through the self-dissolution of the officialist Fecech, the refounding of the FECh and the student centers of each faculty:

Period	President(a)	Movement
1983-1984	Yerko Ljubetic	DCU
1984-1985	Carlos Saffirio	DCU
1985-1986	Ángel Domper	DCU
1986-1987	Luis Lizama	DCU
1987-1988	Pablo Jaeger	DCU
1988-1989	Alejandro Soto	DCU
1989-1990	Guillermo de la Jara	DCU
1990-1991	Sergio Espejo	DCU
1991-1992	Eduardo Atala	JS
1992-1993	Patricia Roa	JS
1993-1994	Jorge Zúñiga	JS
1994-1995	Jimmy Rojas	JPPD
1995-1996	Gabriel Reyes	DCU
1996-1997	Claudio Márquez	JS
1997-1998	Pablo Bussenius	JS
1998-1999	Pablo Bussenius	JS
1999-2000	Jorge Gómez Oyarzo	DCU
2000-2001	Rachid Majluf	JS
2001-2002	Rodolfo Cornejo	Left Students + JJCC
2002-2003	José Palma	Ind.
2003-2004	Alex Shnacke	JPPD
2004-2005	Matías Meza-Lopehandía	Autonomous Students
2005-2006	Servando Omerovich	JS
2006-2007	Ramón Sepúlveda	U. Social
2007-2008	José Luis Corvalán	DCU
2008-2009	Gabriel Boric	IA
2009-2010	Amanda Gaete	JS
2010-2011	Constanza Martínez	Arrebol
2011-2012	Esteban Miranda	IA
2012-2013	Gabriel Ossandón	JS
2013-2014	Álvaro Valenzuela	«Retrocedamos»
2014-2015	Leonardo Jofré	Actuar Colectivo
2015-2016	Ximena Peralta	IA
2016-2017	Pedro Saavedra (Ind.)	Sigue Derecho!
2017-2018	Juan Cristóbal Cantuarias (JS)	Unidos Podemos (JS + JJCC)
2018-2019	Paula Astudillo (JS)	Unid@s Podemos (JS + JJCC)
2019-2020	Vicente Bustos (CS)	Frente Amplio (CS)
2020-2021	Miguel Astudillo (REU)	Reunamos
2021-2022	Camila Requena (REU)	Reunamos
2022-2023	Josefa Fernández (JJCC)	Sacar la Voz (JJCC + Ind.)
2023-2024	Agustina Melo (JS)	Nueva Escuela (JS + P1)
2024-2025	Catalina Huerta (JS)	Más Escuela (JS + Ind.)

=== Alumni center ===
In 2010, under the auspices of the Faculty of Law Foundation, the Alumni Center of the Faculty of Law of the University of Chile (CEDU) was created, whose purpose is to bring together all the faculty's alumni.

== University life ==
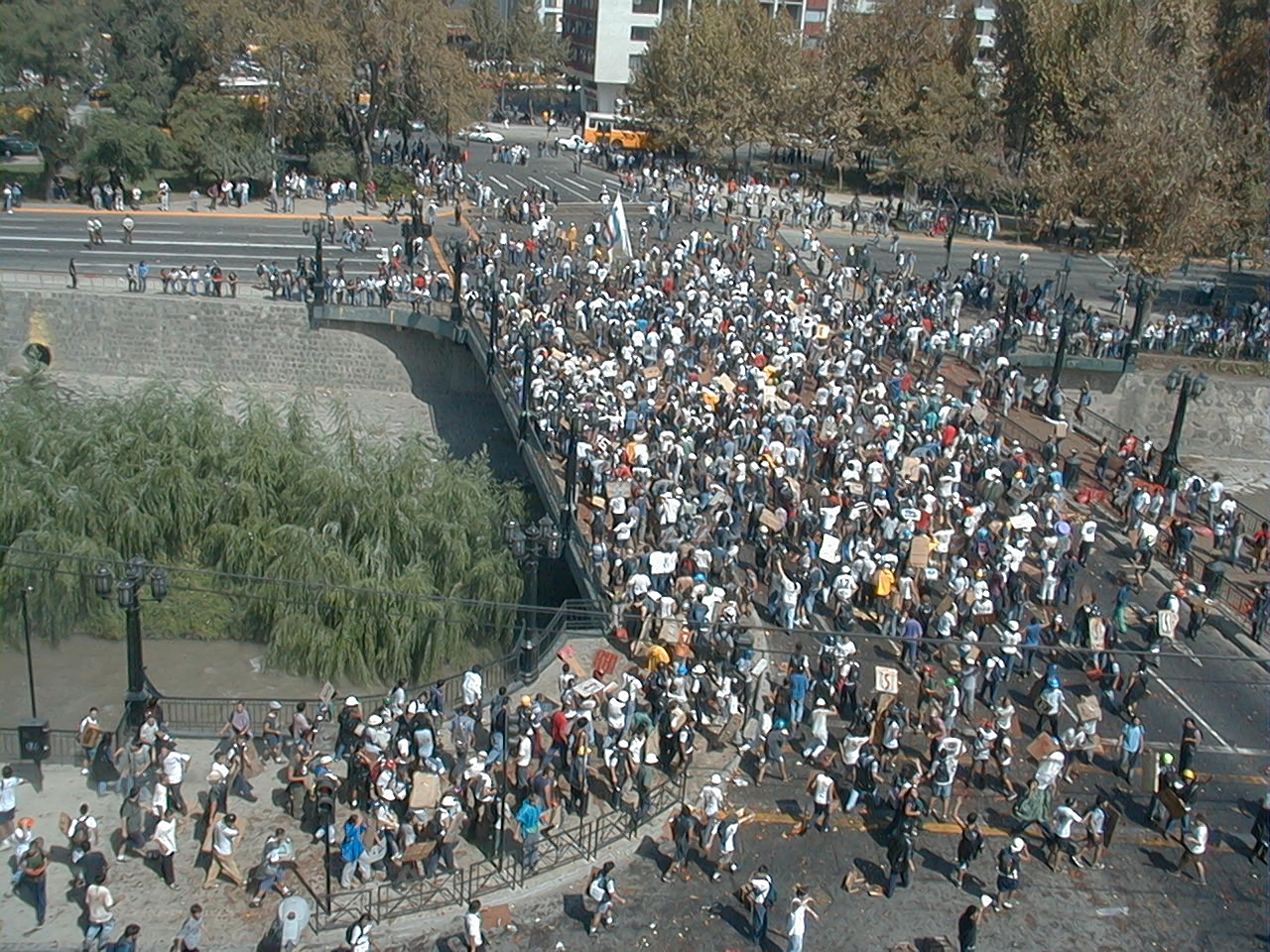
«War on the Pío Nono Bridge» in 2000, the last time freshman students ("mechones") from Law and Engineering of the University of Chile clashed.

The Faculty has intense activity throughout the year. In addition to the official faculty activities such as seminars and forums, there are a series of instances promoted by the Student Center (CED) and by students in general. Political activism is one of these forms of student participation, reflected in general elections held both internally in the Faculty and to elect the board of the Student Federation (FECh). On each of these occasions, various political movements campaign within the Faculty, including youth divisions of established political parties as well as independent movements.

Throughout the year there are instances of recreation and celebrations that have become traditional within the Faculty. The first is the welcome week for new students entering the program, known as «mechones». During this «mechona week», generally the first fortnight of March, new students underwent a rite of passage called «mechoneo», prepared by second-year students. This practice was eliminated in 2016 for being considered degrading to students. There are also two trips, one organized by the CED and another by the FECh, which used to take place in the resort of Cartagena and are now held at the beach of El Tabo, Valparaíso Region. Another tradition during «mechona week» was a clash between freshman students of the Faculty of Law and those of the Faculty of Physical and Mathematical Sciences, University of Chile on the Pío Nono Bridge, but it was canceled in 2000 due to incidents that year, including injured students and damage to the Central Building of the Law School, valued at 3.5 million pesos.

Other classic parties are the third-year students' celebration week, known as «el ombligo» —referring to being halfway through the program—. In addition, there are traditional parties organized by the Student Center such as the fonda held in the days leading up to the Fiestas Patrias, and the «Spring Festival», a tradition from the 1960s revived in 2004.

== Awards ==
The Faculty of Law grants various distinctions to its most outstanding students and alumni, among which the following stand out:

- Premio Pedro Nicolás Montenegro, to the best graduating student of each annual class.
- Premio Editorial Legis Chile, for the best students in the cycles of Tax Law, Labor Law, and Commercial Law.
- Premio Editorial Jurídica de Chile, to the best students in each course.
- Premio Philippi, Yrarrázaval, Pulido & Brunner, awarded by said law firm to the best students in the Civil Law cycle.
- Premio Manuel Egidio Ballesteros, awarded to the best undergraduate thesis of the Department of Procedural Law.
- Premio Francisco Orrego Vicuña, awarded to the most outstanding graduate in the disciplines of International Law.
- Premio Ximena Gutiérrez Rosa, awarded to the best undergraduate thesis of the Department of Labor Law and Social Security.
- Premio Juan Bustos Ramírez, awarded to the best undergraduate thesis of the Department of Criminal Law.

== Public perception ==
The Faculty of Law of the University of Chile has always been considered one of the best in the country, both for its historical tradition and for the level of its graduates. Although in Chile there are no objective academic studies on law schools, there are publications that attempt to make more subjective rankings based on statistics or public perception. The best known is the annual publication of the magazine Qué Pasa, where the Faculty has disputed first place year after year with its counterpart at the Pontifical Catholic University of Chile.

The newspaper El Mercurio consulted in 2007 which were the best universities to study Law, and 86% named the University of Chile, ranking first in preferences. That same year, a study published by the website Laborum.com revealed that 54% of companies preferred lawyers graduated from the University of Chile, while the following university obtained 29% of preferences.

== Image gallery ==
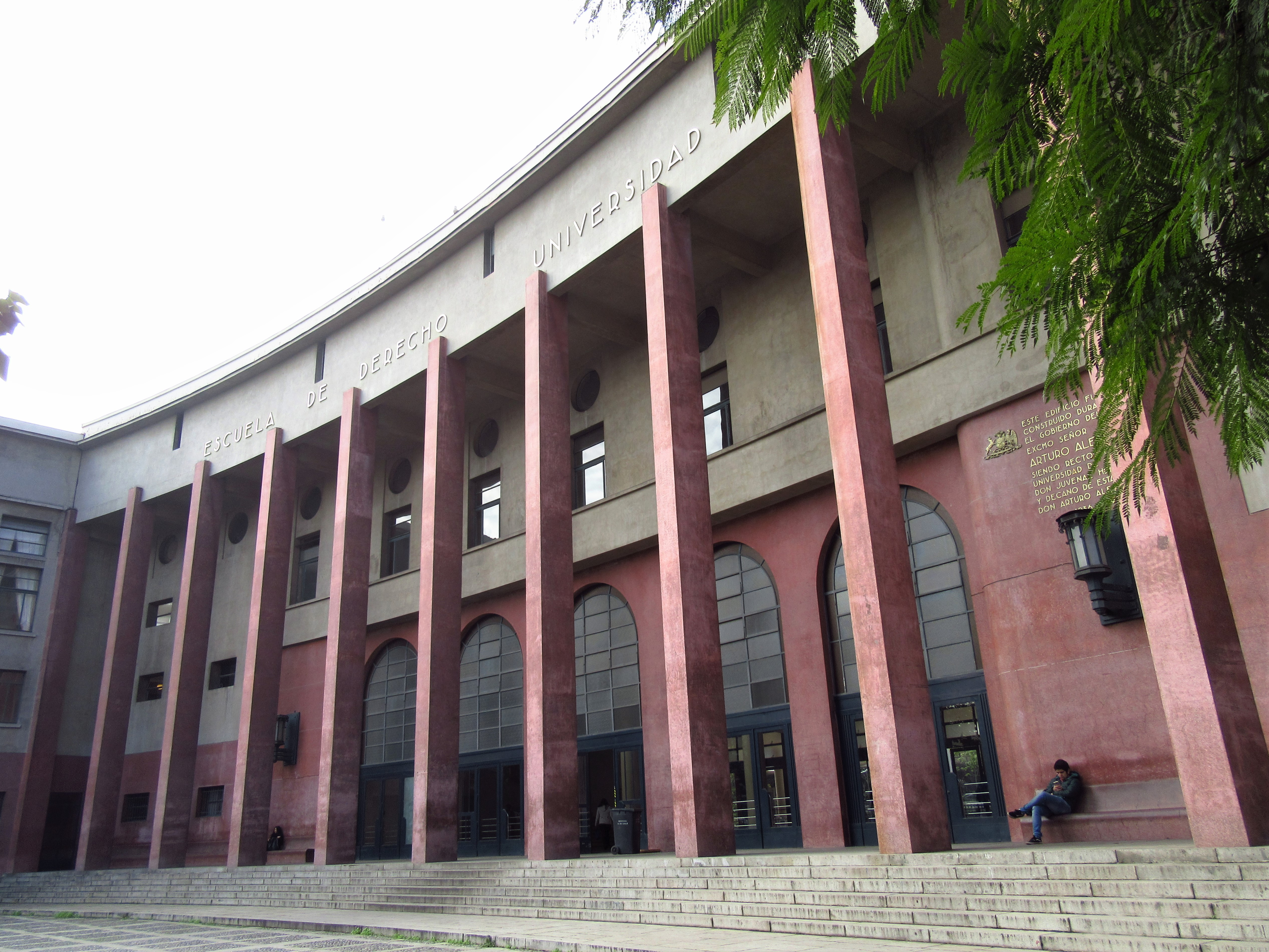
Façade of the Faculty.

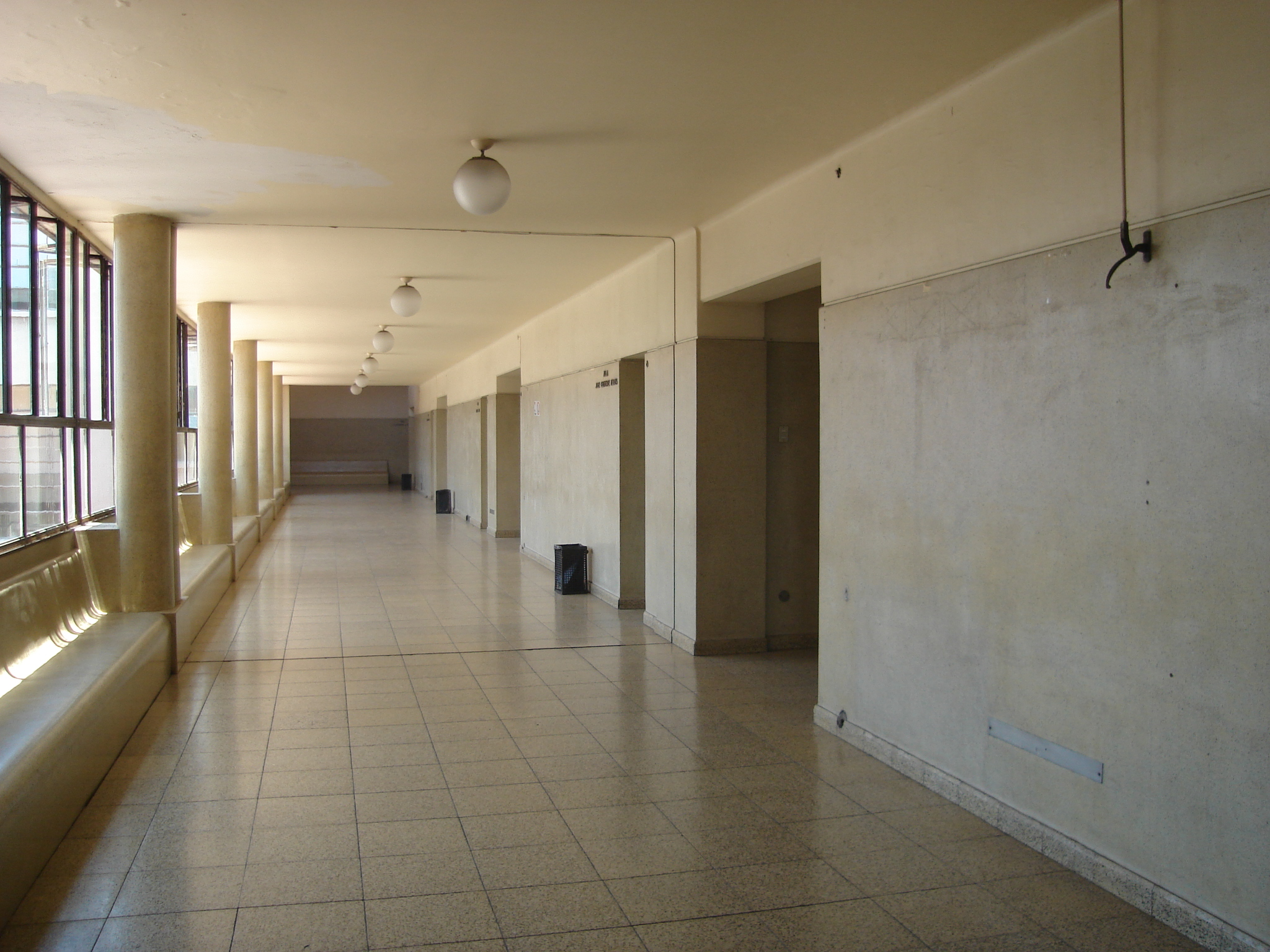
Corridor of the central building of the Faculty of Law.

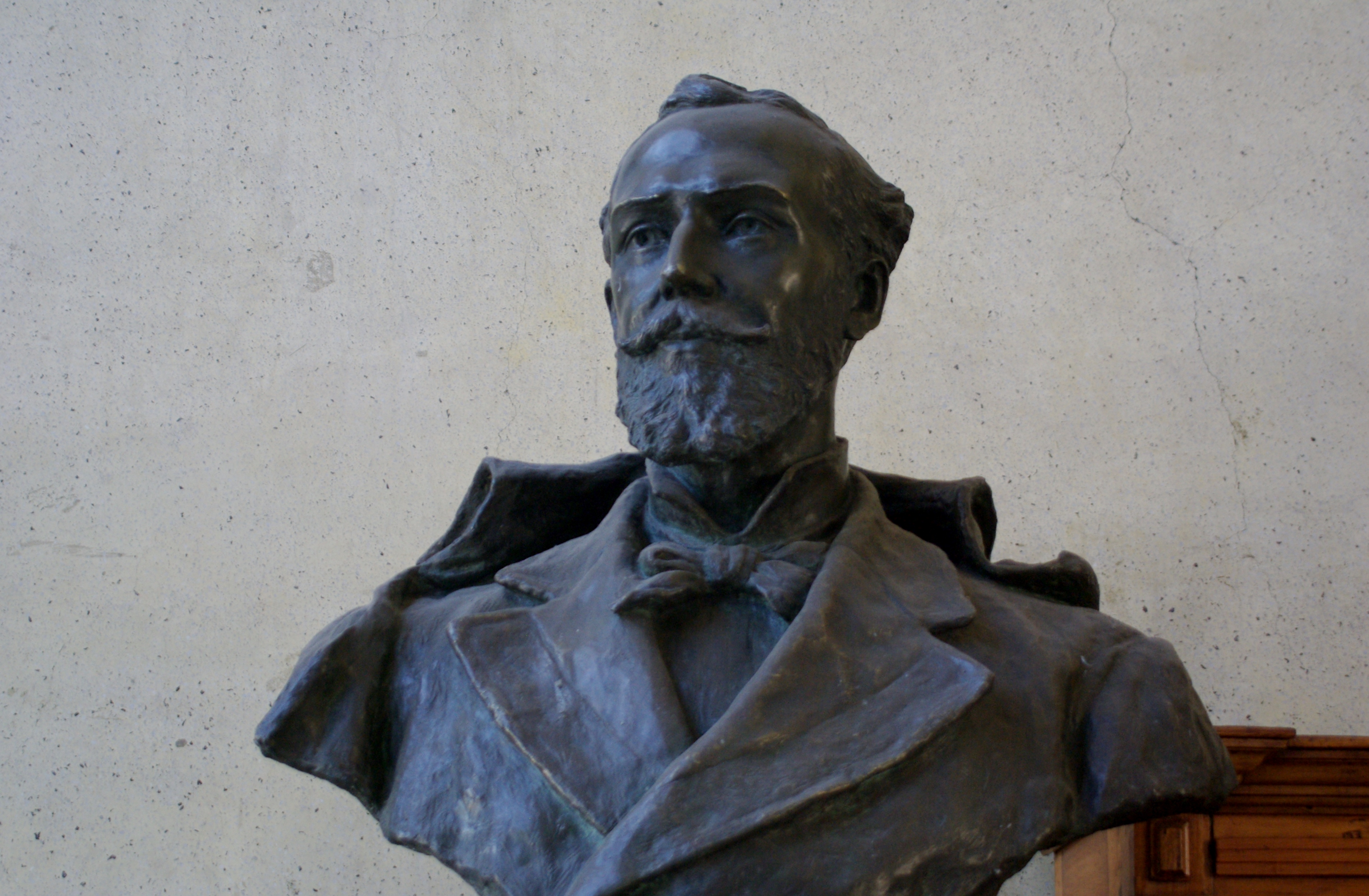
Bust of rector Jorge Huneeus Zegers at the Faculty.

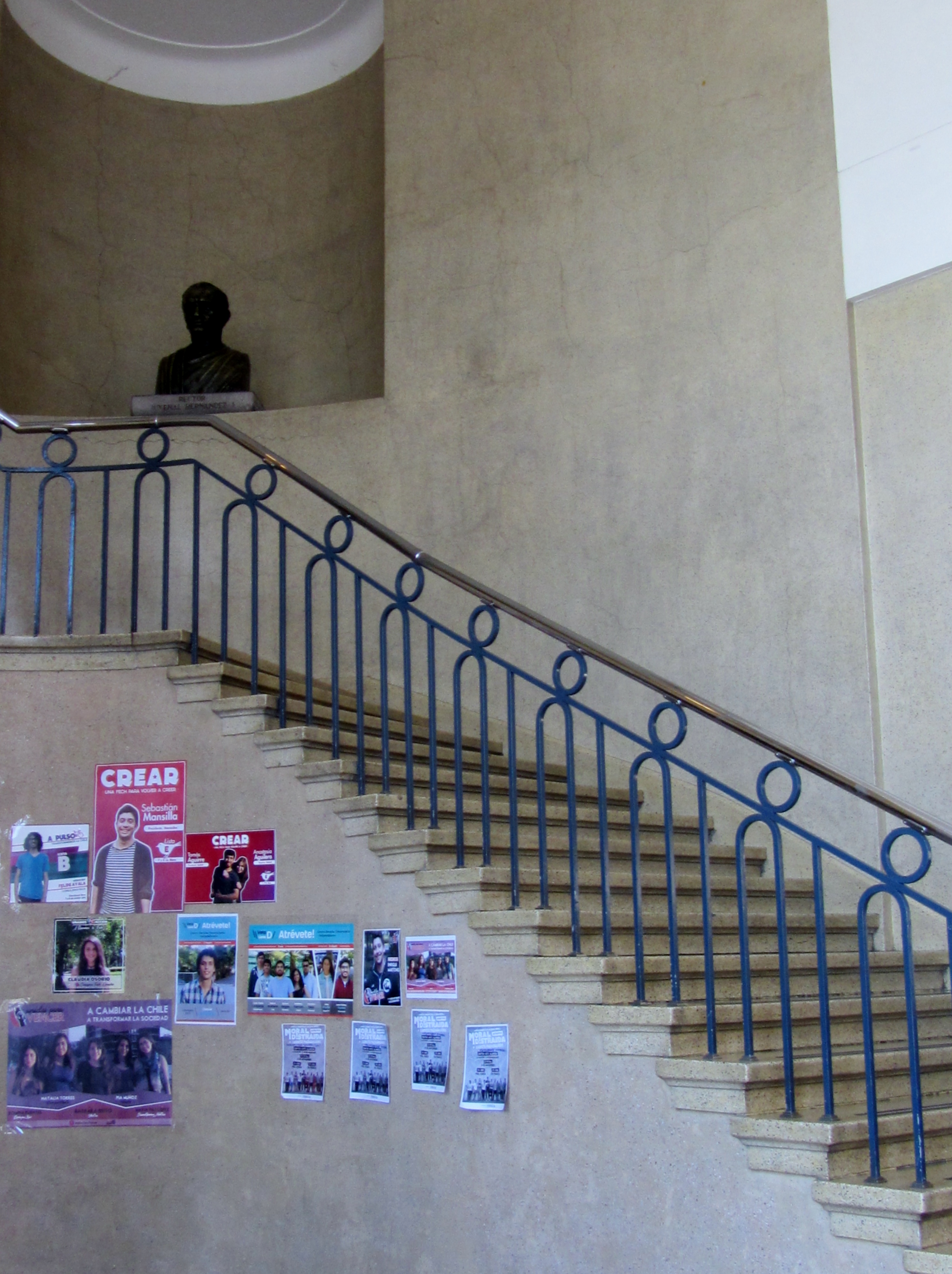
Staircase with electoral propaganda.

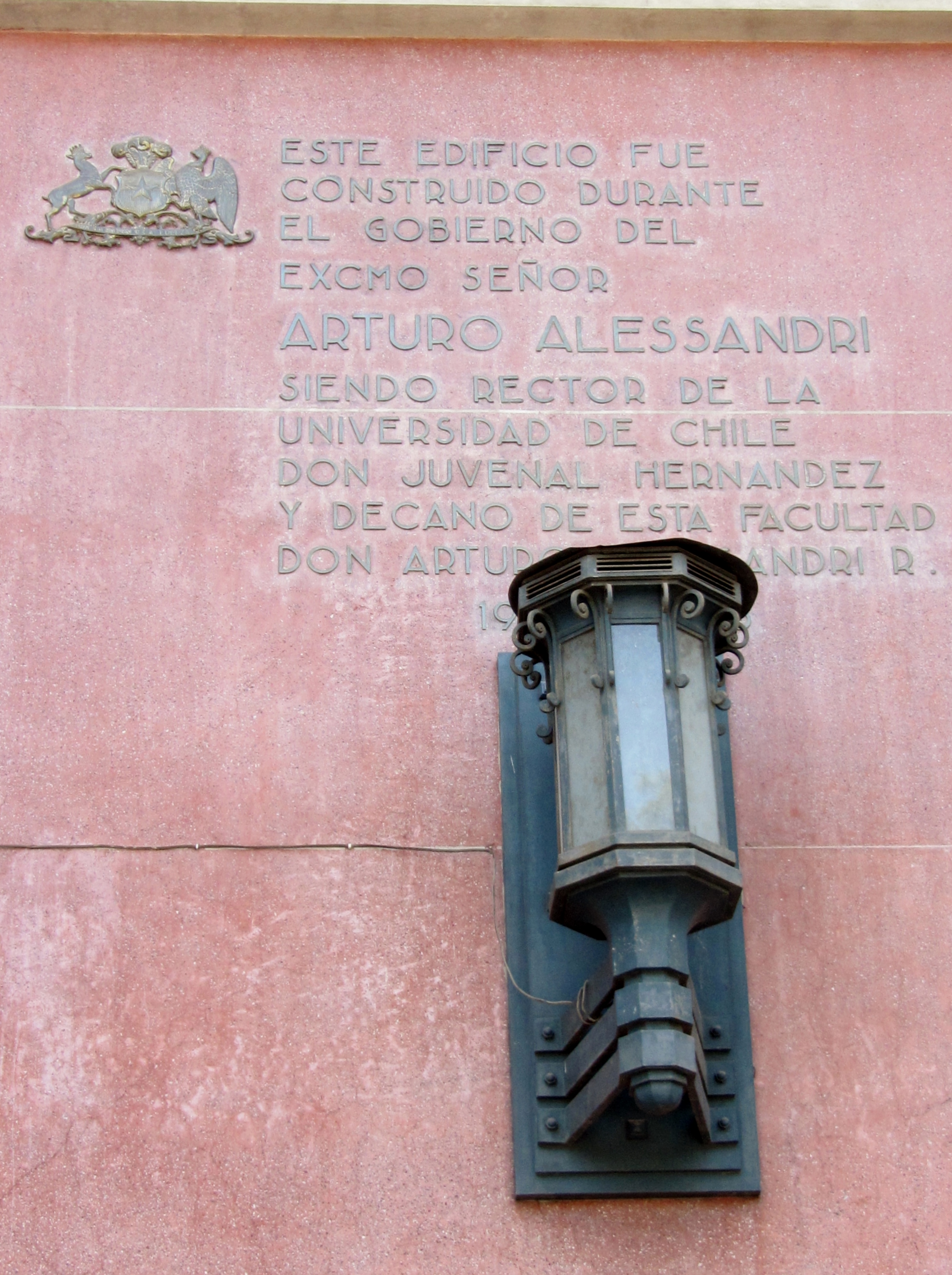
Commemorative plaque of the building's construction.

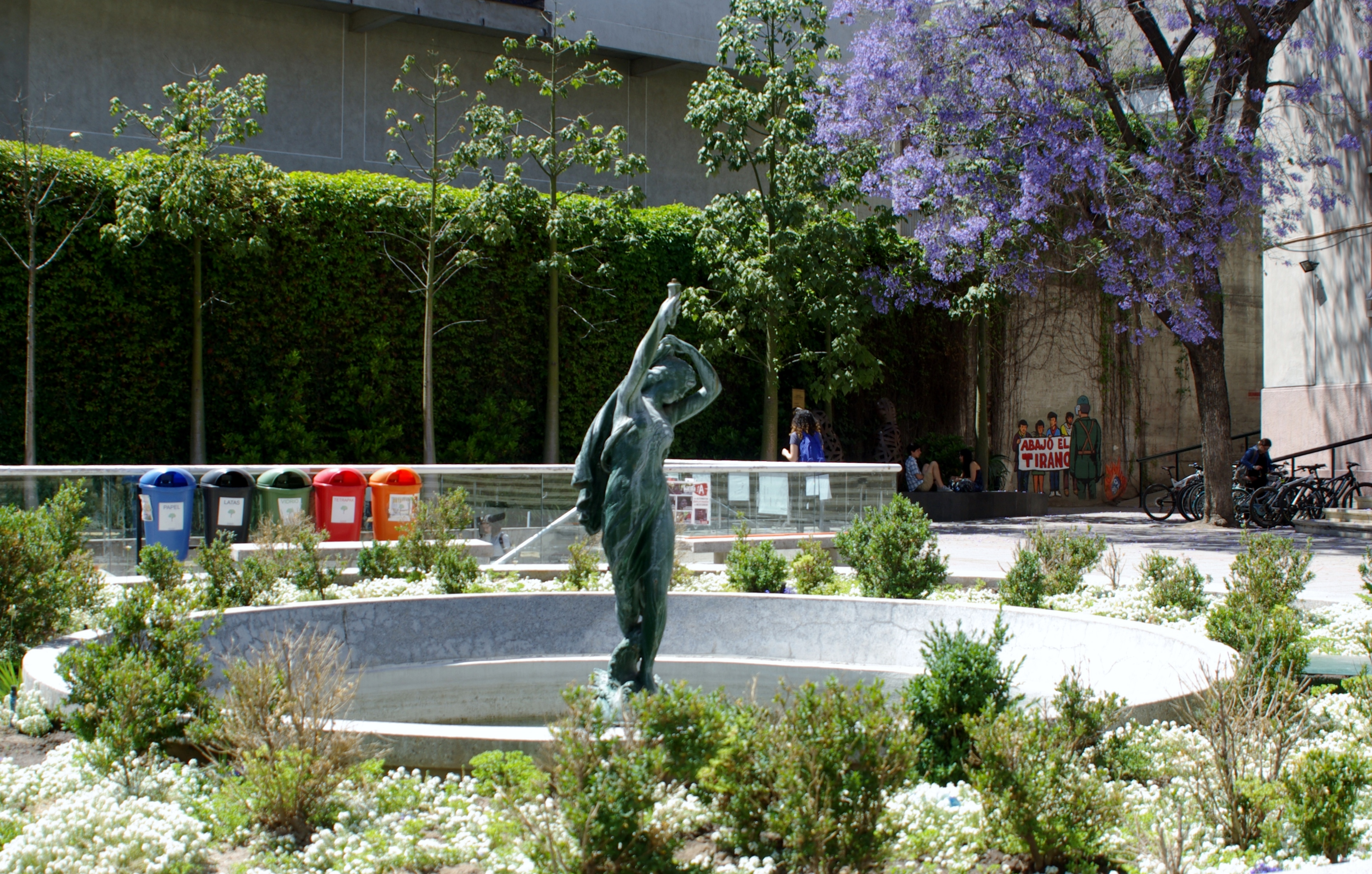
Fountain located in the courtyard.

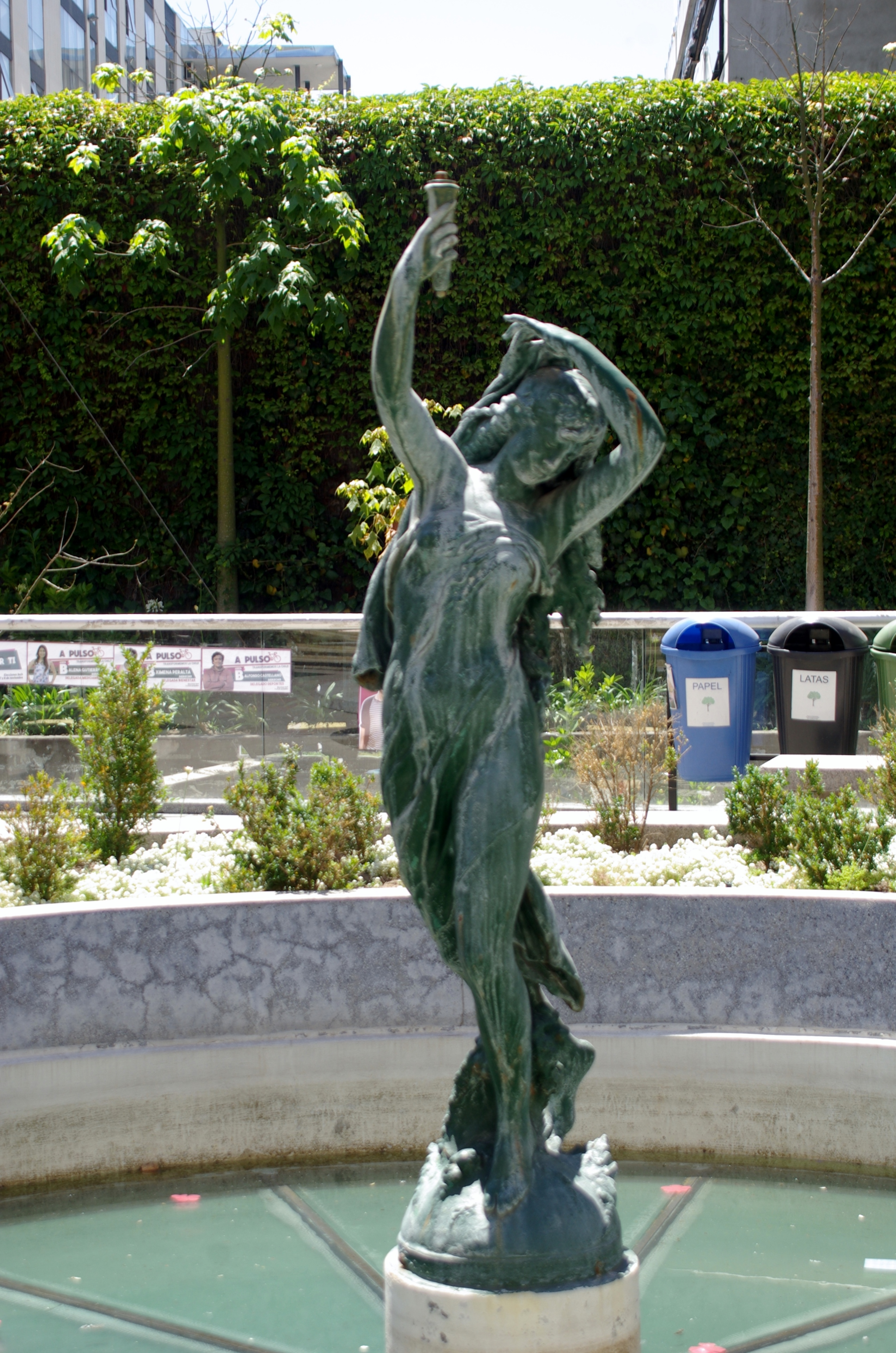
The fountain sculpture.

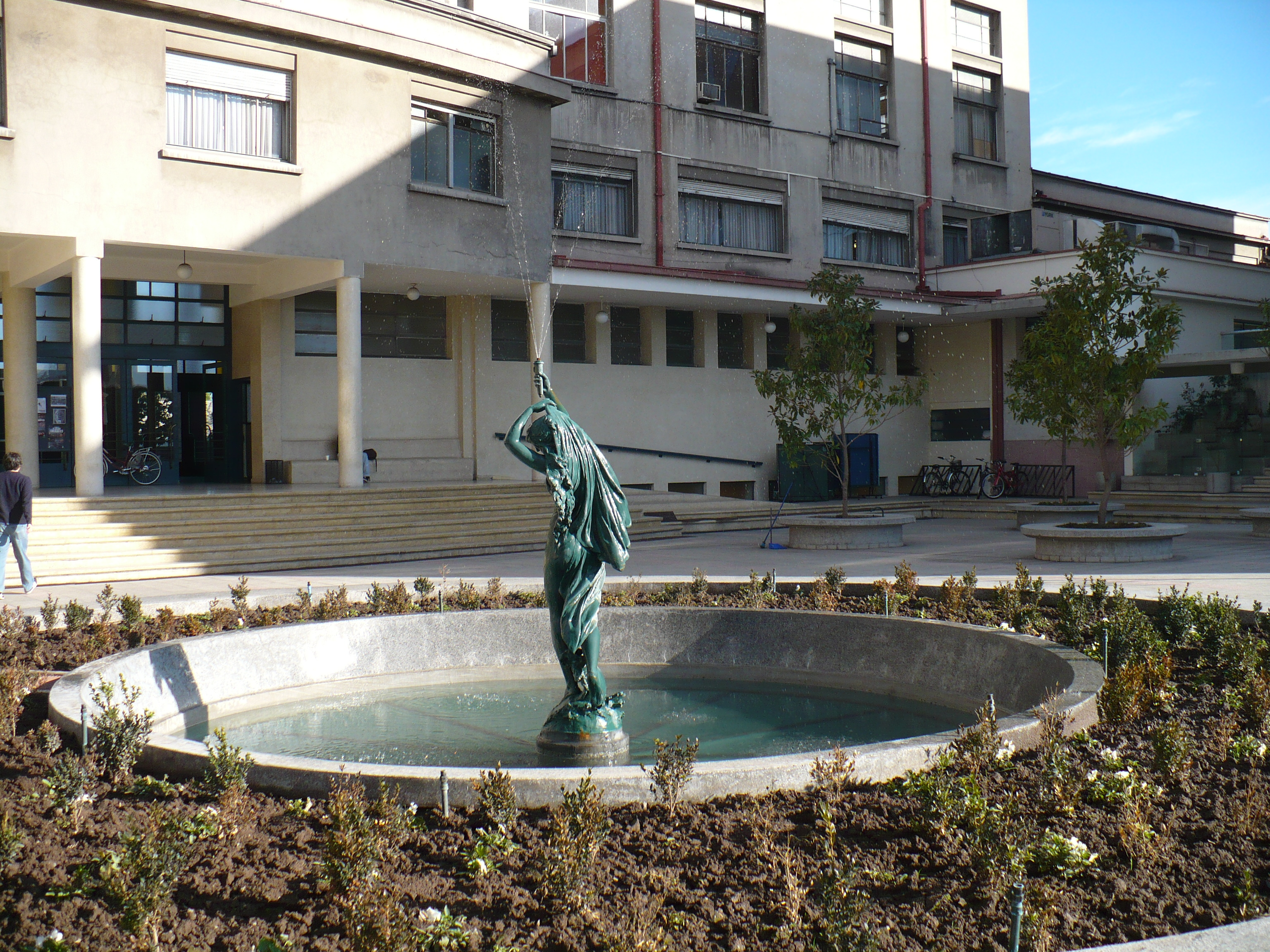
The fountain in operation.

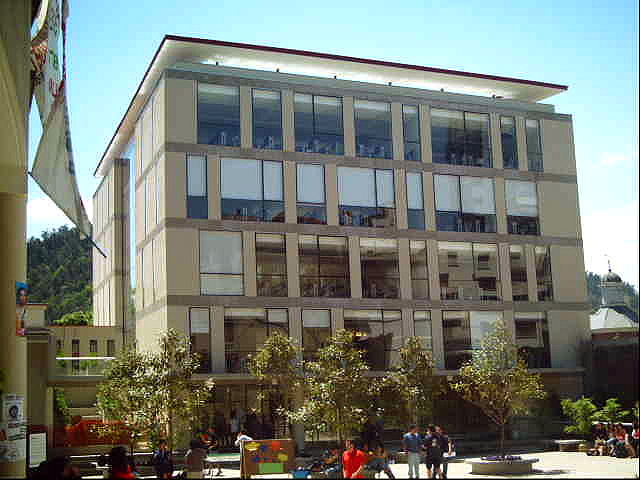
Presidents' Building, inaugurated in 2007. Work by Marsino Arquitectos Asociados.

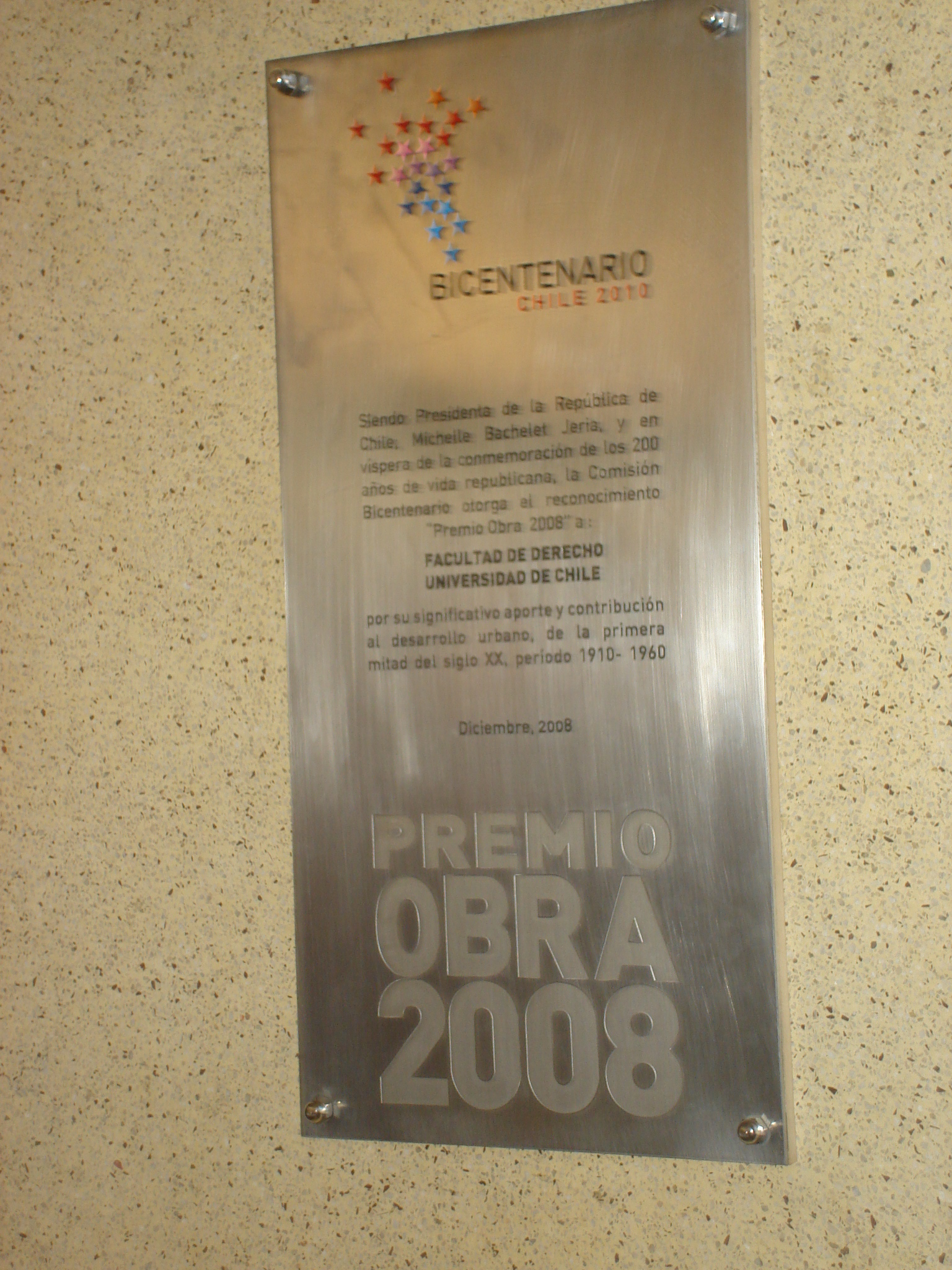
Commemorative plaque of the 2008 Work Award to the Faculty building.

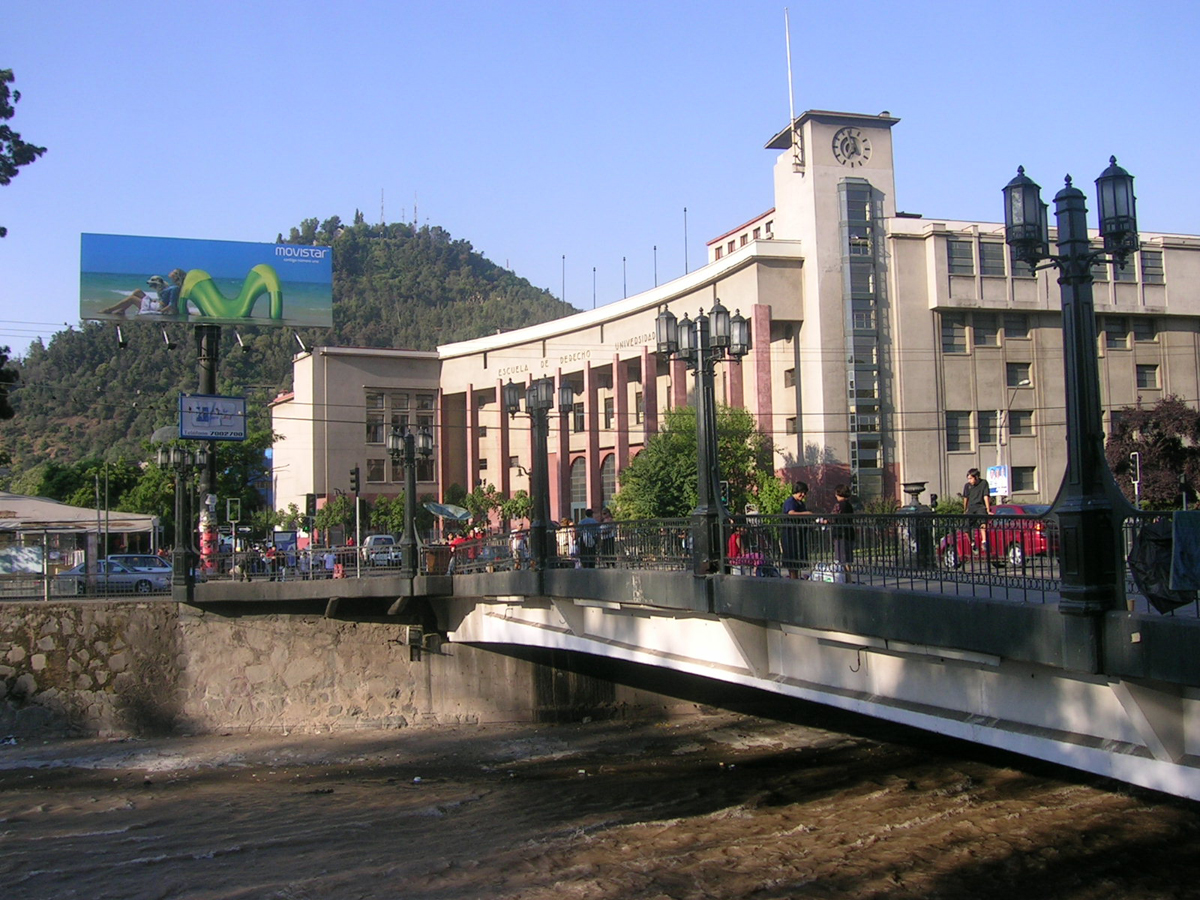
Faculty from the south bank of the Mapocho River.

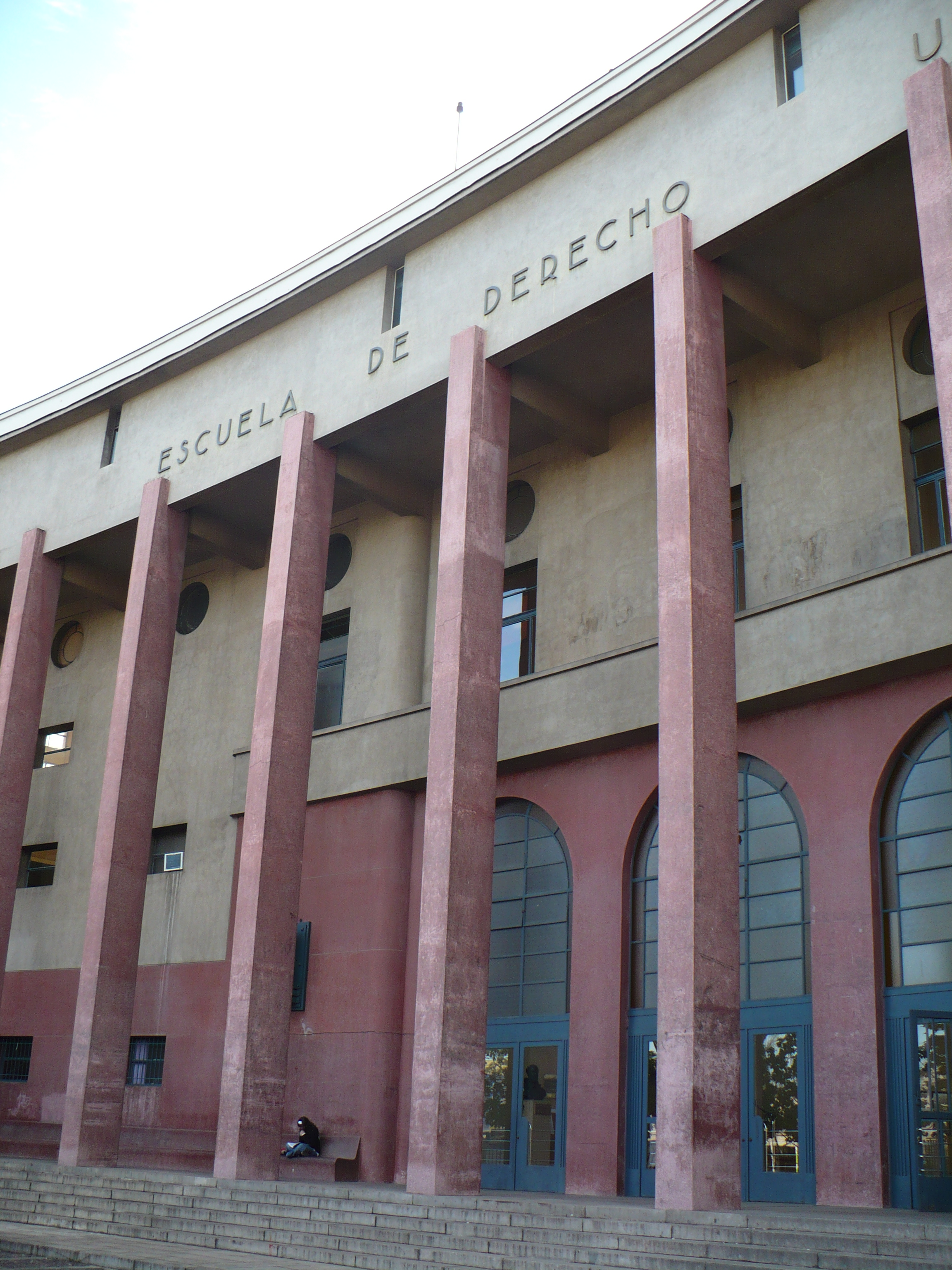
Main entrance to the Faculty.

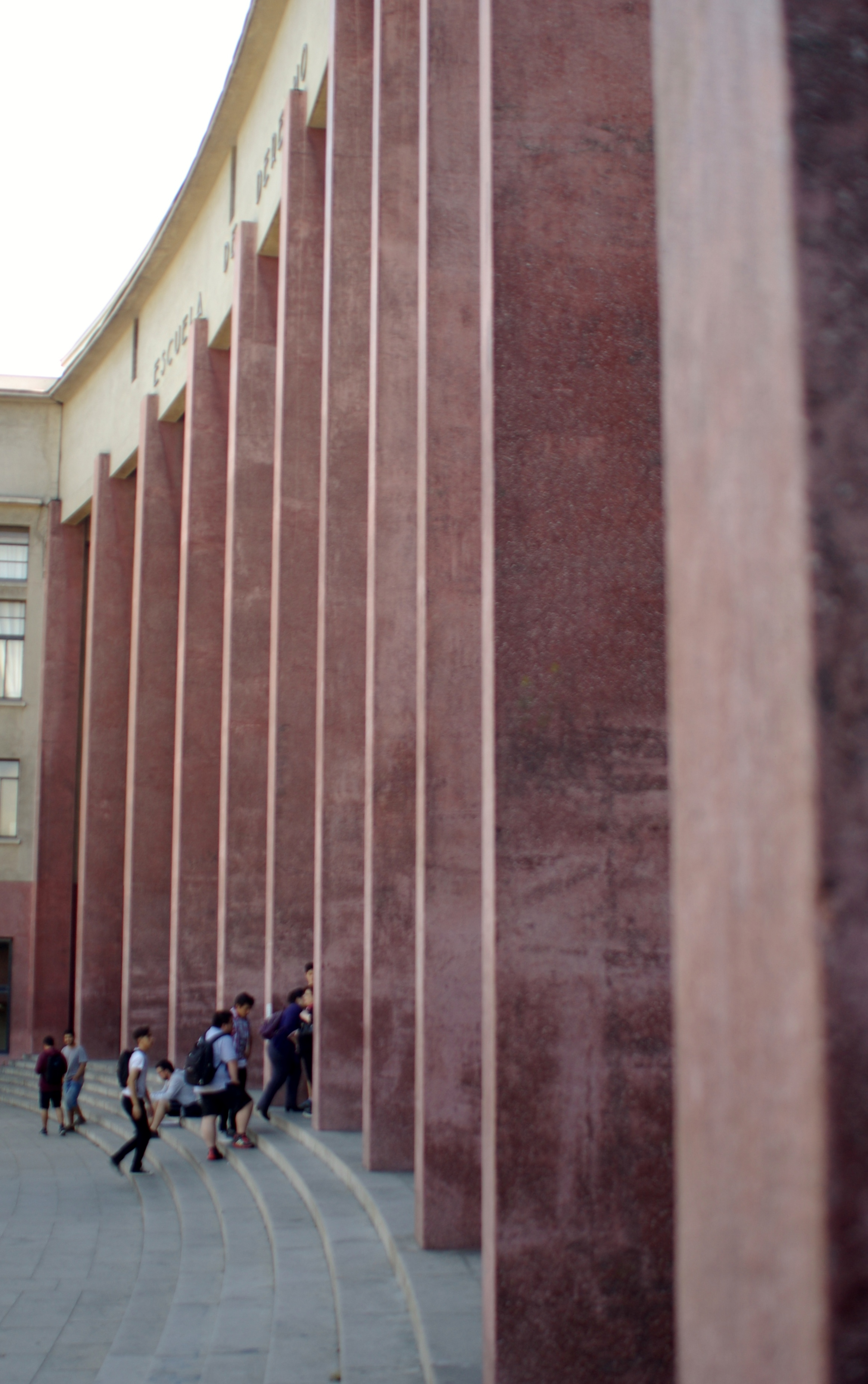
Colonnade of the façade.

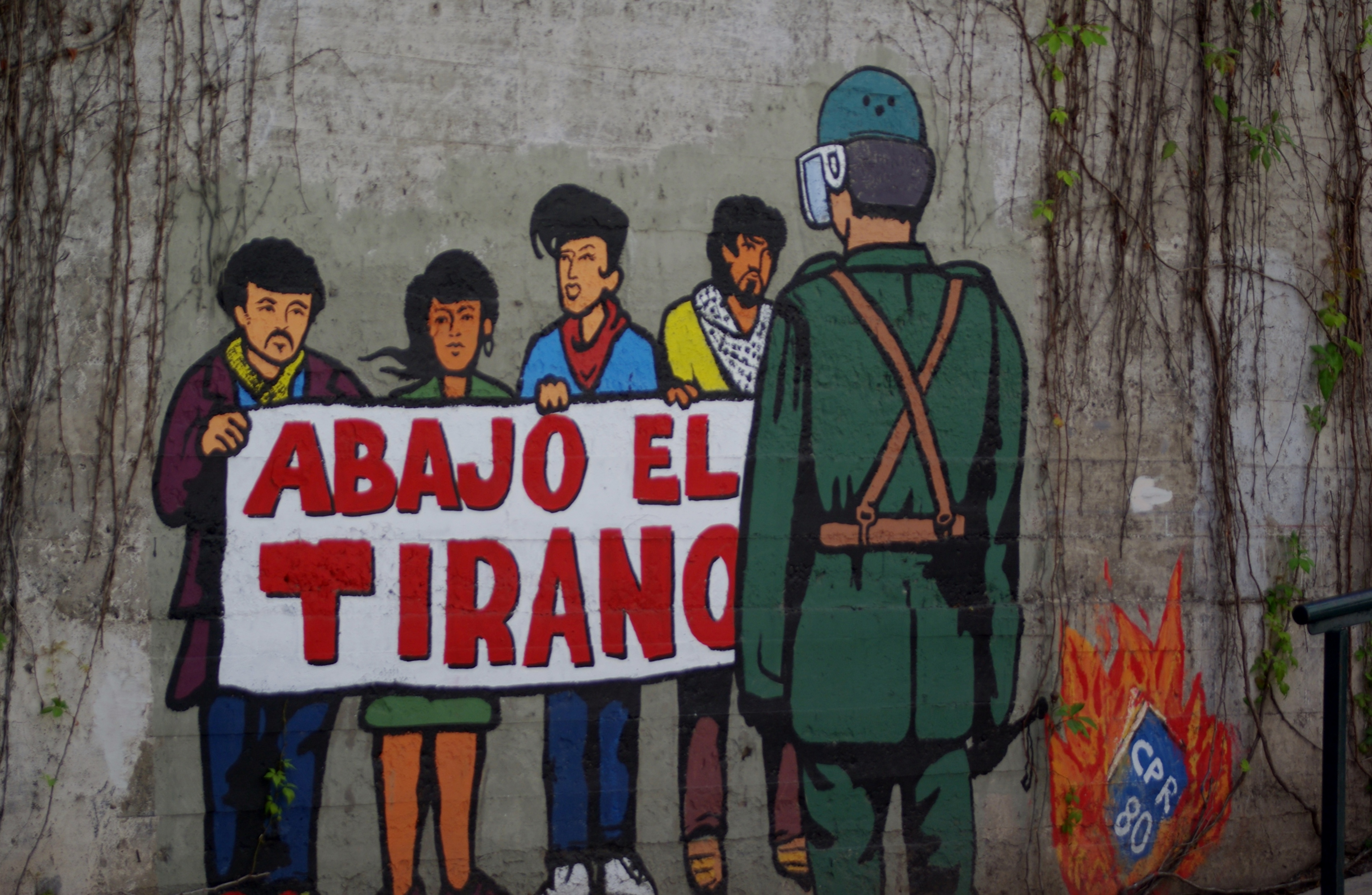
Political graffiti in the courtyard.

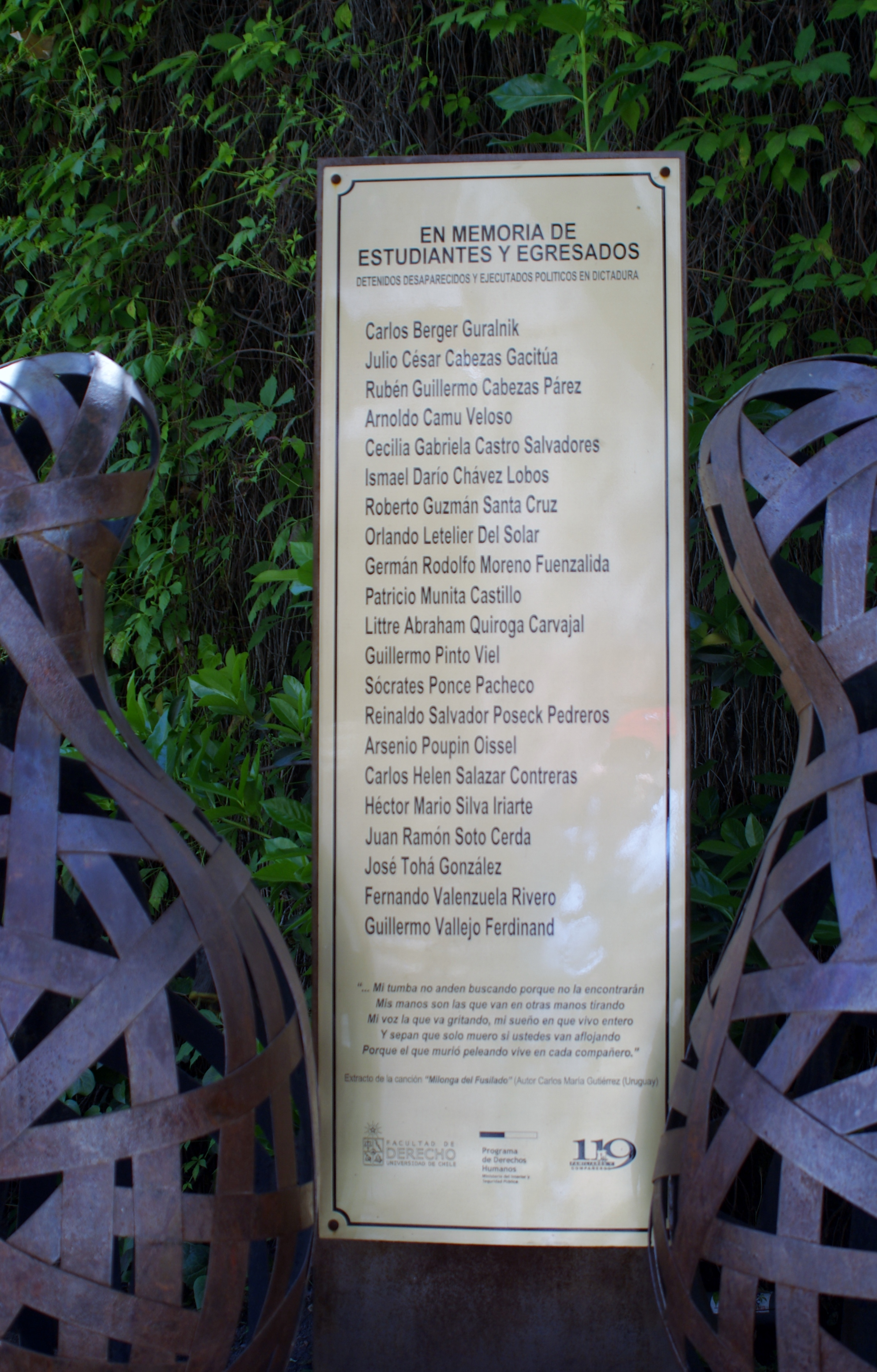
Plaque of the memorial to the victims of the military dictatorship.

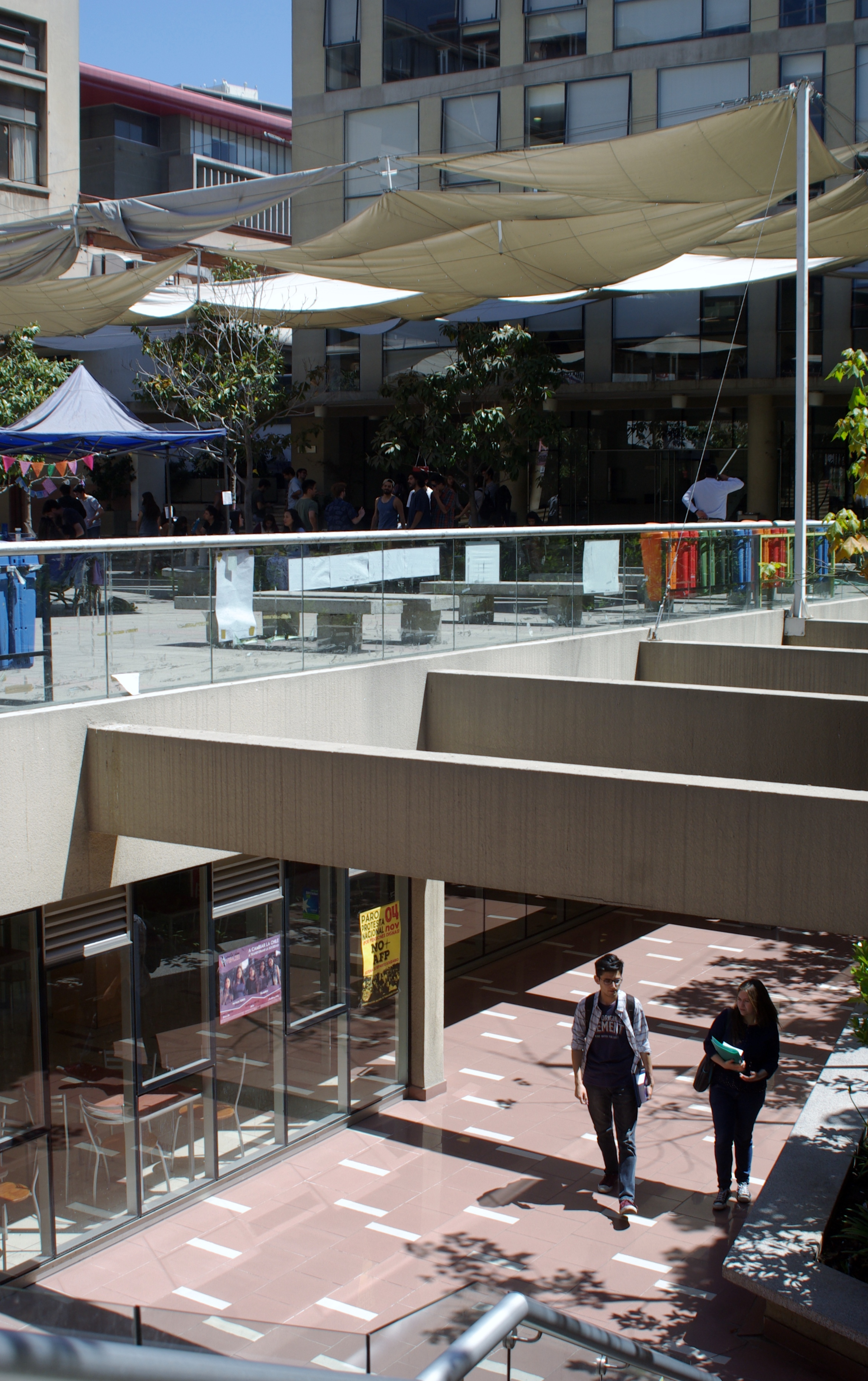
Partial view of the basement level.

== See also ==
- Institute of Public Affairs of the University of Chile
- Barrio Bellavista

== Bibliography ==
- Mellafe Rojas, Rolando; Rebolledo, Antonia; Cárdenas, Mario (1992). Historia de la Universidad de Chile (in Spanish). Santiago: Ediciones de la Universidad de Chile.
- Bascuñán, Aníbal (1946). "La Facultad de Ciencias Jurídicas y Sociales" [The Faculty of Legal and Social Sciences]. Thesis (in Spanish). Archived from the original on June 17, 2008.
