= Amelia Solar de Claro =

Chilean poet

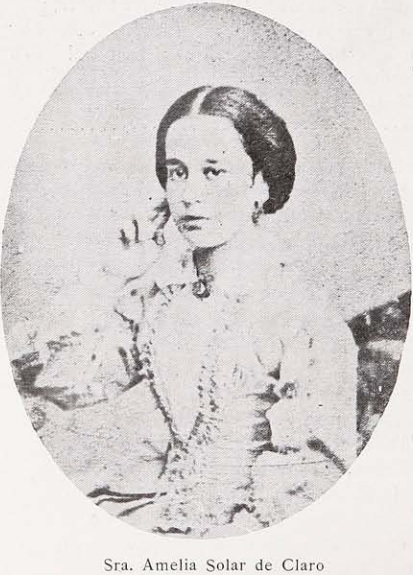
- (undated)
- Born: Maria Amelia de las Mercedes Solar; October 11, 1836 -
- Died: November 21, 1915
- Occupation: Writer
- Spouse: José Luis Claro y Cruz
- Children: 4
- Writing career
- Language: Spanish
- Genres: poems; plays; essays
- Notable work: María Cenicienta: comedia en 3 actos i en verso

Amelia Solar de Claro (October 11, 1836 - November 21, 1915) was a Chilean poet, playwright, and essayist.

== Biography ==
Maria Amelia de las Mercedes Solar was the daughter of José María del Solar Marín and Mercedes Marín del Solar, the first Chilean poet and intellectual.

She married José Luis Claro y Cruz, the promoter and one of the founders of the Cuerpo de Bomberos de Santiago, with whom she had four children, among them the jurist Luis Claro Solar and the deputy Raúl Claro Solar.

She is recognized for having written and published one of the first dramatic texts of Chilean children's literature: María Cenicienta: comedia en 3 actos i en verso (María Cinderella: comedy in 3 acts and verse), a comic work that was performed in Valparaíso in 1884. Together with other writers such as Delfina María Hidalgo or Quiteria Varas Marín, Solar published some of the first texts assigned to Chilean women's poetry at the end of the 19th century.

== Selected works ==
- Haroldo: episodio del siglo XV, tomado del francés (Santiago: Imprenta "Victoria", 1887). (text)
- María Cenicienta: comedia en 3 actos i en verso (Santiago: Establecimiento Poligráfico Roma, 1898; Impr, i Libr. Excelsior, 1917). (text)
- Recuerdos (Santiago: Imp. Universitaria, 1914). (text)
- Poesías de la Sra. Amelia Solar de Claro (Santiago: Impr. y Encuadernación Antigua Inglesa, 1916). (text)
