= Luis Claro Solar =

Chilean lawyer, politician and jurist

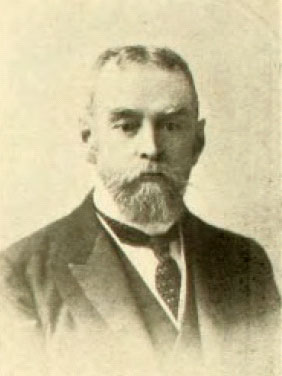
Luis Claro Solar

Luis Claro Solar (January 20, 1857 – July 19, 1945) was a distinguished Chilean lawyer, politician and jurist. He was a Senator of the Republic of Chile and President of the Senate. His magnum opus was the treatise Explicaciones del Derecho Civil Chileno y Comparado (Explications of the Chilean and Comparate Law) consisting of fifteen tomes. He also was a member of the Cuerpo de Bomberos de Santiago (Santiago's Fire Brigade), becoming superintendent.

== Biography ==
=== Family and studies ===
His parents were José Luis Claro y Cruz and Amelia Solar de Claro.

His first studies were cursed in the Instituto Nacional, where he was admitted in 1870, being rector of that institution don Diego Barros Arana. Later, in 1876 he was admitted into the Faculty of Law of the Universidad de Chile, titrating on January 3, 1880.

In 1884 he married Victoria Salas Errázuriz, with whom he had six sons.

=== Political career ===
In the administration, he served the charge of Subsecretary of the Ministry of the Interior - at that time called Major Officer - during the government of José Manuel Balmaceda.

During 1912, he returned to the politics when he was elected as Senator by the Province of Aconcagua. He integrated the Senate of Chile during two periods, until 1924, presiding over it since 1920. In 1918 he was called to the Ministry of Finance, from where he advocated monetary policies that influenced the creation of the Central Bank of Chile.

=== Academic career ===
Later, he was involved into the exercise of the profession and also into the university teaching, having in both an outstanding performance. He taught Civil Law in the University of Chile, being his principal work the "Explications of the Chilean and Comparate Law" (Explicaciones del Derecho Civil Chileno y Comparado), that, even though incomplete due to his dying, is the most important work of the Civil Law Jurisprudence and one of the most transcendent in the Latino-American Jurisprudence.
