= Mercedes Marín del Solar =

Chilean writer (1804–1866)

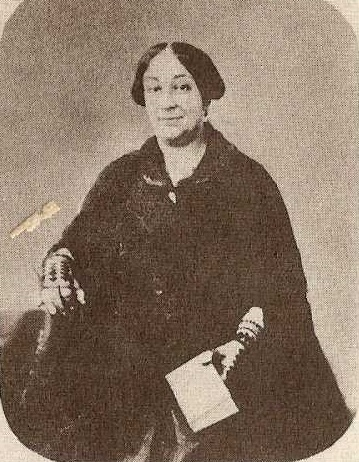
Mercedes Marín del Solar

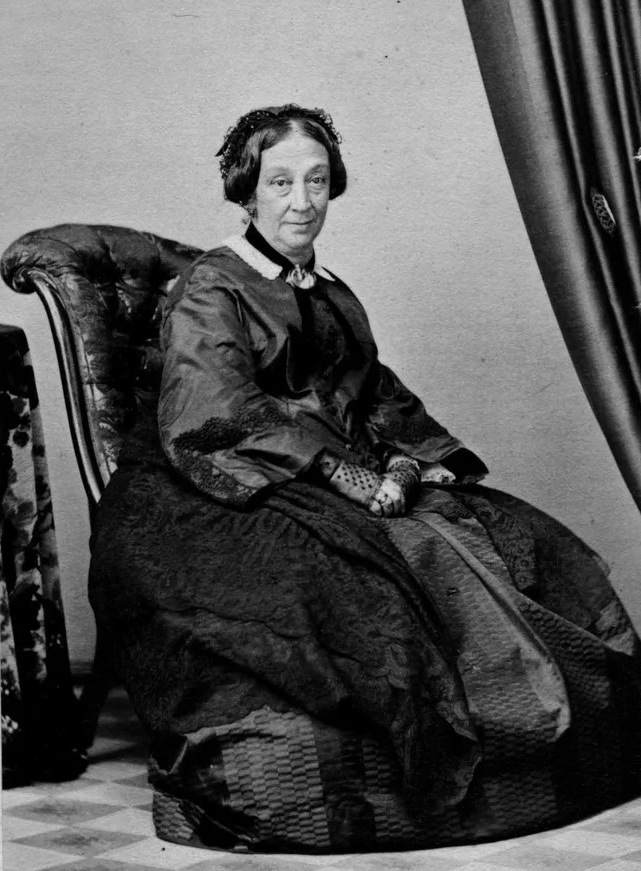
{undated)

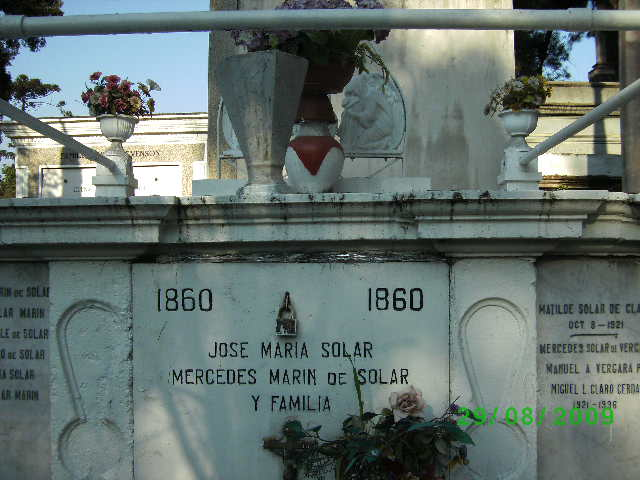
tomb

Mercedes Marín del Solar (September 11, 1804 - December 21, 1866) was a Chilean poet, school reformer, and women's rights activist.

Marin del Solar hosted a literary salon in her home and advocated for women's right to education in Chile. Her daughter, Amelia Solar de Claro, was a Chilean poet, playwright and essayist.

== Selected works ==
=== Poetry collections ===
- Canto Fúnebre a la Muerte de Don Diego Portales (1837; under the name "por una Dama Chilena")
- A la Muerte del Ilustre Sabio (dedicated to Andrés Bello)
- Canto a la Patria (1857)
- Al Retrato de mi Marido
- A mi Hija Carolina
- A mi Hija Luisa

=== Non-fiction ===
- Plan de Estudios para una niña (1840)

== Sources ==
- Mercedes Marín del Solar (1804-1866). Obras reunidas. Compilación, estudio preliminar y notas críticas de Joyce Contreras Villalobos. Santiago: Centro de Investigaciones Diego Barros Arana/ DIBAM, 2015.
