= Luis Ortiz Quiroga =

Chilean lawyer (1934–2025)

Luis Ortiz Quiroga (Spanish: [ˈlwis oɾˈtis kiˈɾoɣa]; 1934 – August 5, 2025) was a Chilean lawyer and criminal law scholar.

== Career ==
From 1961 to 2018, Ortiz served as a full professor of criminal law at the Faculty of Law of the University of Chile, and of the Pontificia Universidad Católica de Chile between 1972 and 2001. He was also a visiting professor at New York University in 1973.

On June 9, 2009, Ortiz was appointed vice-dean of the Faculty of Law of the University of Chile, replacing Cristián Maturana, who had resigned the previous week.

Ortiz was a member of the Board of Directors of the Chilean Bar Association, where he served as vice-president between 2003 and May 2007 and during the government of Eduardo Frei Ruiz-Tagle, he was also president of the Board of Directors of Televisión Nacional de Chile.

== Death ==
Ortiz died on August 5, 2025, at the age of 91.
