= Garmendia =

Garmendia is the surname of a family of the Basque Country region of Guipuzcoa, in Spain. The surname means "wheat mountain" (gar 'wheat', mendi 'mountain'), after Garmendia de Iraurgui, later known as Salvatierra de Iraurgui, later the site of the cities of Azpeitia and Azkoitia.

As almost every Basque family, Garmendia enjoys the status of hidalgo, of ancient origin, previous to the Reconquista. The coat of arms of some of its bearers is Argent, a boar sable, running away from a hunter, who injures it with a lance sable tipped azure, upon a hill vert with a tree vert.

== Notable people sharing the surname Garmendia ==
- Basil Spalding de Garmendia, American tennis player
- Cristina Garmendia, Basque businesswoman and Science & Innovation Minister of Spain
- Francisco Garmendia, American Catholic bishop
- Germán Garmendia, Chilean YouTuber, comedian, and writer
- Ion Garmendia Anfurrutia, Basque musician
- José Ignacio Garmendia, Basque footballer
- Joseba Garmendia, Basque footballer
- Luisa Garmendia, First Lady of Chile 1827 to 1829, wife of President Francisco Antonio Pinto
- Nerea Garmendia, Basque actress and comedian
- Salvador Garmendia, Venezuelan author

=== As a second or maternal surname ===
- Aníbal Pinto de Garmendia, President of Chile from 1876 to 1881
- Augusto Pérez Garmendia, Spanish military officer
- Enrique Molina Garmendia, Chilean philosopher
- Enriqueta Pinto Garmendia, First Lady of Chile 1841–1846 and 1846–1851, wife of President Manuel Bulnes
