= Pinto family =

Chilean political family

The Pinto family is a Chilean family, active in politics since the 18th century. Luisa Garmendia is considered the founder of the Pinto political dynasty.

== Members ==
- Francisco Antonio Pinto (1785–1858), lawyer, military general, politician and 3rd President of Chile; married Luisa Garmendia (1797–1857), First Lady of Chile during 1827 to 1829 and founder of the Pinto political dynasty.
  - Enriqueta Pinto Garmendia (1817–1904), translator and First Lady of Chile during 1841 to 1851; married Manuel Bulnes Prieto (1799–1866), military officer, politician and 5th President of Chile.
    - Manuel Bulnes Pinto (1842–1899), military officer and politician; married Elena Calvo Cruchaga.
    - Lucia Bulnes de Vergara (1845–1932), writer; married Ruperto Vergara Rencoret (1835-1908).
    - Gonzalo Bulnes Pinto (1851–1936), journalist, historian and politician; married Carmela Correa Sanfuentes.
      - Francisco Bulnes Correa (1886 –1970), lawyer and politician; married Blanca Sanfuentes Echazarreta.
        - Manuel Bulnes Sanfuentes (1911–1975), lawyer and politician; married Elena Cerda Echeverría
        - Francisco Bulnes Sanfuentes (1917–1999), lawyer and politician; married Elisa Ripamonti Barros.
        - Jaime Bulnes Sanfuentes (1923–2007), merchant, farmer, businessman, and politician; married Eliana Zegers León.
  - Aníbal Pinto Garmendia (1825–1884), lawyer, politician and 9th President of Chile; married Delfina de la Cruz (1837–1905), a pianist and First Lady of Chile.
    - Francisco Antonio Pinto Cruz (1858–1905), lawyer, politician and diplomat; married Teresa del Río Plummer and Julia Riesco Ugarte.
      - Aníbal Pinto del Río; married Inés Santa Cruz Wilson
        - Aníbal Pinto Santa Cruz (1919–1999), economist; married Malucha Solari (1920–2005), a Nicaraguan-Chilean ballerina and choreographer
          - Malucha Pinto Solari (born 1955), actress, theater director, playwright and politician; married Joaquín Eyzaguirre
      - Marie-Thérèse Pinto (1894–1980), sculptor; married Giorgio Berring-Nicoli, an Italian industrialist, and Gilbert Médioni, a French diplomat, physician, Mesoamerican anthropologist and artist..
    - José María Pinto Cruz (died 1923) farmer and politician; married Isabel Bello Codesido.

== Other notable members ==
- Ignacio Carrera Pinto (1848–1882), soldier, hero of the War of the Pacific and member of the Carrera family; great-grandson of Francisco Antonio Pinto
- Julio Allard Pinto (1885–1975), politician and military officer
- Julio Ortíz de Zárate (1885–1946), painter and sculptor
- Manuel Ortíz de Zárate (1887–1946), painter; married Jadwiga Piechowska (1885–1944), a Polish painter
- Laure Lourié (née Ortíz de Zárate; 1911–2001), French costume designer; married John Ferren (1905–1970), American artist and educator and Eugène Lourié (1903–1991), Russian-French filmmaker

== See also ==
- Pinto, Chile
