= Marie-Thérèse Pinto =

Chilean sculptor (1894-1980)

- Born: 5 September 1894; Santiago, Chile
- Died: 4 April 1980 (aged 85); Paris, France
- Other names: Marie Teresa Pinto de Medioni; Marie-Thérèse Médioni
- Spouse(s): Giorgio Berring-Nicoli (died) Gilbert Médioni
- Relatives: Francisco Antonio Pinto (great-grandfather); Luisa Garmendia (grandmother); Aníbal Pinto (grandfather); Delfina de la Cruz (grandmother); Enriqueta Pinto (aunt); Manuel Bulnes Pinto (cousin); Lucia Bulnes de Vergara (cousin); Aníbal Pinto Santa Cruz (nephew)
- Family: Pinto family

Marie Teresa Pinto de Medioni (née Pinto del Rio; 5 September 1894 – 4 April 1980), known as Marie-Thérèse Pinto, was a Chilean sculptor active in Paris.

== Early life ==
María Teresa Francisca Josefa Pinto del Rio was born on 5 September 1894 (Note: Also cited and self-reported by Pinto as 1910.) in Santiago to Francisco Pinto Cruz, a lawyer, politician and diplomat, and Teresa del Río de Pinto (née Río y Plummer). Through her father Pinto was a member of the Pinto family, and was the granddaughter of Aníbal Pinto and Delfina de la Cruz and the great-granddaughter of Francisco Antonio Pinto and Luisa Garmendia. Pinto was one of three siblings.

Part of Pinto's childhood was spent in the German Empire whilst her father served as the Chilean ambassador from 1894 to 1898 and again in 1902 until his death in August 1905. Pinto later relocated to Italy where she lived and studied under the Chilean sculptor Rebeca Matte Bello, a friend of her mother's.

== Career ==
Pinto began her sculpture career in Italy. In 1934, Pinto settled in Paris and became a student of Constantin Brâncuși before later studying under Henri Laurens from 1935 to 1938.

In 1936, Pinto exhibited at the Salon des Tuileries. Pinto's work during this period adhered to European academic canons.

=== Mexico ===
In 1940, Pinto settled in Mexico alongside her husband Gilbert Médioni, a diplomat for the Free France delegation in Mexico City. Pinto worked at the Free French Information Centre, founded by Médioni and Jacques Soustelle.

In Mexico Pinto became part of the Surrealist group in exile, and her work became influenced by both surrealism and Pre-Columbian art. In 1941, Pinto and Médioni published Art in Ancient Mexico: Selected and Photographed from the Collection of Diego Rivera, which presented Diego Riveras collection of pre-Columbian sculptures. In Chile the book is known to have influenced the work of the sculptors Lily Garafulic, Rosa Vicuña, Teresa Vicuña, and Marta Colvin.

=== Return to France ===
Upon returning to post-war Paris, Pinto exhibited at the Paul Guillaume Gallery and became part of the New School of Paris. From June 1949 to August 1950, Pinto's work was exhibited across Latin America as part of the “From Manet to our days” (Spanish: De Manet a nuestros días) travelling exhibition of French art. In 1950 Pinto lived and worked on the Rue Lhomond.

From 1950 to 1960 Pinto exhibited at the Salon de la jeune sculpture (Young Sculpture Salon). In 1951, Pinto was one of five sculptors chosen to represented France at the 1st São Paulo Art Biennial. Pinto exhibited two sculptures "Cabeza de Mujer" (1949) and "Milán y La Esfinge" (1950). The two sculptures were then exhibited at the Chilean National Museum of Fine Arts in 1952. The same year Pinto exhibited alongside Étienne Martin, François Stahly and Juana Muller in a group exhibition at the galerie MAI (Meubles Architectures Installations) in Paris.

== Person life ==
Pinto married Giorgio Berring-Nicoli, an Italian industrialist, and was later widowed. Pinto later married Gilbert Médioni, a French diplomat, physician, Mesoamerican anthropologist and artist.

Pinto died on 4 April 1980 (Note: Also cited as 2000.) in Paris.

== Bibliography ==
- Médioni, Gilbert; Pinto, Marie-Thérèse (1941). Art in Ancient Mexico: Selected and Photographed from the Collection of Diego Rivera. Oxford: Oxford University Press.
