= Delfina de la Cruz =

Chilean pianist and First Lady

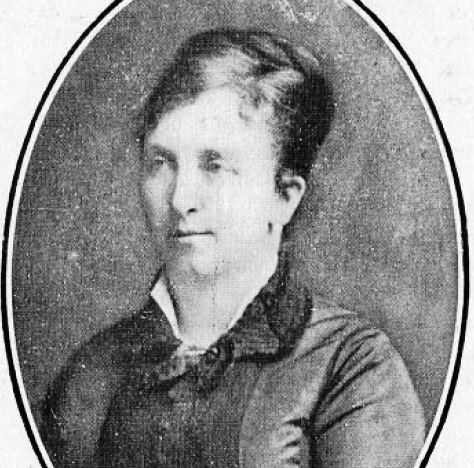

First Lady of Chile
- In role 18 September 1876 – 18 September 1881
- President: Aníbal Pinto
- Preceded by: Eulogia Echaurren
- Succeeded by: Emilia Márquez de la Plata

Personal details
- Born: 24 February 1837 Concepción, Chile
- Died: 8 May 1905 (aged 68) Concepción, Chile
- Spouse: Aníbal Pinto (m. 1855; died 1884)
- Relations: Luis de la Cruz (grandfather); Francisco Antonio Pinto (father-in-law); Luisa Garmendia (mother-in-law); Enriqueta Pinto (sister-in-law); Manuel Bulnes (cousin and brother-in-law); Manuel Bulnes Pinto (nephew); Lucia Bulnes de Vergara (niece); Marie-Thérèse Pinto (granddaughter)
- Children: 7
- Parent: José María de la Cruz (father)
- Musical career
- Also known as: Delfina Pérez
- Occupations: Pianist; composer
- Instrument: Piano

Delfina de la Cruz Zañartu (24 February 1837 – 8 May 1905), also known as Delfina Pérez, was a Chilean pianist, composer and First Lady of Chile during 1876 to 1881. De la Cruz was the first female composer of choral music in Chile.

== Early life and family ==
De la Cruz was born on 24 February 1837 in Concepción to General José María de la Cruz and Josefa Zañartu Trujillo. De la Cruz was the paternal granddaughter of Luis de la Cruz, and the cousin of Manuel Bulnes.

On 24 November 1855 De la Cruz married Aníbal Pinto, a lawyer, politician and future 9th President of Chile. The marriage had political undertones; Pinto's father, Francisco Antonio Pinto, former President of Chile, felt that the marriage would help to heal the relationship between the cities of Concepción and Santiago. Animosity had arisen between the cities as a result of the 1851 Chilean revolution, during which uprisings had taken place in Concepción against the central government based in Santiago. The marriage would create a familial link between de la Cruz's father, José Maria de la Cruz and Pinto's brother-in-law, Manuel Bulnes, who had fought against each other in the Battle of Loncomilla.

De la Cruz and Pinto had seven children, including the lawyer, politician and diplomat Francisco Antonio Pinto Cruz. Through marriage De la Cruz was related to two other First Ladies of Chile, her sister-in-law of Enriqueta Pinto, and her mother-in-law of Luisa Garmendia.

== Career ==
De la Cruz was an accomplished pianist and composer. Under the pseudonym Delfina Perez, de la Cruz published 12 works throughout the 19th century, surpassed in volume only by Isidora Zegers. Her work was praised by local press in Valparaíso and Santiago, where she sometimes performed benefit concerts. Several of her pieces also attained international recognition, including "The Star of Night" ("Spanish: La estrella de la tarde"), a polka for piano which was played in Paris, as well as "Armando the Gondolier" ("Spanish: Armando el gondolero"), a waltz for piano later performed in Germany. She is also the first Chilean woman to venture into the composition of choral music, at the time a male-dominated sphere.

== First Lady of Chile ==
Pinto was elected president of Chile in 1876, and de la Cruz accompanied him to all government ceremonies, even inspecting the troops in his company during the War of the Pacific.

Honorary titles
Preceded by Eulogia Echaurren	First Lady of Chile; 1876–1881	Succeeded by Emilia Márquez de la Plata
