= Lucia Bulnes de Vergara =

Chilean writer

- Bulnes in 1880
- Born: Lucia Bulnes Pinto; 1845; Santiago, Chile
- Died: 1932 (aged 86–87)
- Spouse: Ruperto Vergara Rencoret (died 1908)
- Parents: Manuel Bulnes (father); Enriqueta Pinto (mother)
- Relatives: Manuel Bulnes Pinto (brother); Francisco Bulnes Correa (nephew); Aníbal Pinto (uncle); Delfina de la Cruz (aunt); Francisco Antonio Pinto (grandfather); Luisa Garmendia (grandmother); Joaquín Prieto (great-uncle)
- Family: Pinto family
- Writing career
- Pen name: Ga'Verra'
- Language: Spanish

Lucía Bulnes de Vergara (née Bulnes Pinto; 1845 – 1932), known by the pen name Ga'Verra, was a Chilean writer of short stories and newspaper articles.

== Biography ==
Lucía Bulnes Pinto was born in 1845 in Santiago to President Manuel Bulnes Prieto, a military officer and 5th President of Chile, and of Enriqueta Pinto Garmendia, a translator and First Lady. One of eight siblings Bulnes was the younger sister of Manuel Bulnes Pinto, military officer and politician, and the older sister of Gonzalo Bulnes Pinto, a journalist, historian and politician. Through her mother Bulnes was a member of the Pinto family, and was the grandchild of Francisco Antonio Pinto, the 3rd President of Chile, and Luisa Garmendia, and was the niece of Aníbal Pinto, the 9th President of Chile, and Delfina de la Cruz, a pianist. Through her father Bulnes was the great-nephew of Joaquín Prieto, the 4th President of Chile.

Bulnes was educated in Santiago.

== Career ==
Traveling extensively, she wrote articles and short stories in Familia and La Revista Azul, noting her observations and using the pen name of "Ga'Verra". Also a gifted hostess, she was also known for the tertulias which she founded circa 1880 at her home in Santiago on Monjitas Street.

== Personal life ==
Bulnes was married to Ruperto Vergara Rencoret (1835-1908).
