= Manuel Bulnes Pinto =

Chilean military and political figure

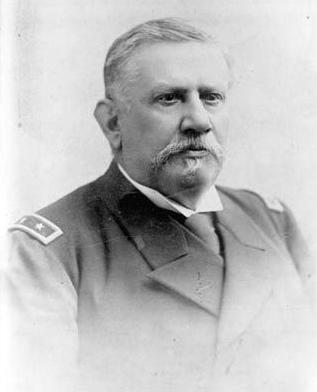
- Bulnes in 1896
- Born: 10 July 1842; Santiago, Chile
- Died: 18 April 1899 (aged 56); Santiago, Chile
- Spouse: Elena Calvo Cruchaga (m. 1877)
- Parents: Manuel Bulnes (father); Enriqueta Pinto (mother)
- Relatives: Lucia Bulnes de Vergara (sister); Francisco Bulnes Correa (nephew); Aníbal Pinto (uncle); Delfina de la Cruz (aunt); Francisco Antonio Pinto (grandfather); Luisa Garmendia (grandmother); Joaquín Prieto (great-uncle)

Manuel Bulnes Pinto (10 July 1842 – 18 April 1899) was a Chilean military officer and politician.

== Early life and education ==
Bulnes was born on 10 July 1842 in Santiago to President Manuel Bulnes Prieto, a military officer and 5th President of Chile, and of Enriqueta Pinto Garmendia, a translator and First Lady. One of eight siblings Bulnes was the older brother of Lucia Bulnes de Vergara, a writer, and Gonzalo Bulnes Pinto, a journalist, historian and politician. Through his mother Bulnes was a member of the Pinto family, and was the grandchild of Francisco Antonio Pinto, the 3rd President of Chile, and Luisa Garmendia, and was the nephew of Aníbal Pinto, the 9th President of Chile, and Delfina de la Cruz, a pianist. Through his father Bulnes was the great-nephew of Joaquín Prieto, the 4th President of Chile.

Bulnes studied at the Colegio de los Padres Franceses and later moved to Paris, where he completed three years of law before returning to Chile.

== Career ==
In 1867, Bulnes joined the Chilean Army as commander of a civic regiment organized and financed by himself. As the head of his regiment, he waged a continuous warfare against the Araucanian Indians in southern Chile, and in 1874 he joined the regular army ranks as a sergeant major.

Manuel Bulnes was elected a deputy for Mulchén in 1879. At the beginning of the War of the Pacific, he organized a cavalry squadron that they named Escuadrón de Carabineros de Yungay, but the transport Rimac where they were traveling to the theater of operations was captured en route by the Peruvian Navy and they were interned as prisoners of war in the city of Tarma. He and his squadron were later freed via prisoner exchange, and they fought at the battles of Tacna, Chorrillos and Miraflores.

After the war, he went on a government commission to Europe, where he was during the 1891 Chilean Civil War. He supported the congressional side and was rewarded with a promotion to Brigade General. He returned to Chile in 1894, where he became Secretary and later Chief of the Army General Staff. In 1896 he was named Minister of War and Navy by President Federico Errázuriz Echaurren. In the short lapse while he held the post (from September 18 to November 26), he managed to regularize the army lists, giving legal equality to all who had ever served under the colors.

== Personal life ==
In 1877, Bulnes married Elena Calvo Cruchaga with whom he had several children.

On 18 April 1899 Bulnes died in Santiago, aged 56.

Political offices
Preceded by Luis Barros Borgoño	Minister of War and Navy; 1896	Succeeded by Elías Fernández Albano
