= Manuela Caldera =

Chilean political activist and First Lady

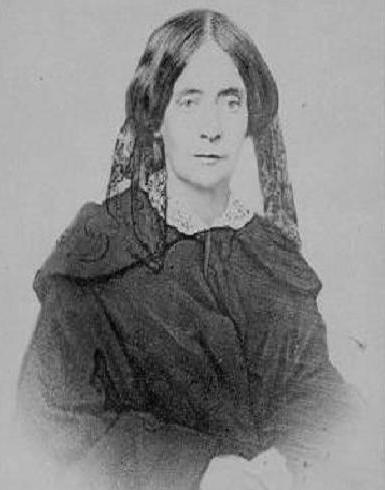

First Lady of Chile
- In role 25 January 1827 – 8 May 1827
- President: Ramón Freire
- Preceded by: Isabel Riquelme
- Succeeded by: Carmen Gana López

Personal details
- Born: Manuela Mercedes Caldera Mascayano c. 1803 Captaincy General of Chile, Spanish Empire
- Died: 30 May 1865 (aged 61–62)
- Resting place: Santiago General Cemetery
- Spouse: Ramón Freire (m. 1826; died 1851)
- Relations: José Joaquín Aguirre (uncle); José Joaquín Pérez (cousin); Juana Rosa Aguirre (cousin)
- Children: 4, including Francisco Freire

Manuela Mercedes Caldera de Freire (née Caldera Mascayano; c. 1803 – 30 May 1865) was the Chilean political activist and the First Lady of Chile during 1827. Following the death of her husband Ramón Freire, Caldera campaigned for the recognition of Freire's legacy.

== Early life and family ==
Manuela Mercedes Caldera Mascayano was born around 1803 to a Santiago family who were members of the Los Ochocientos branch of the Larraín family. Caldera was the niece of José Joaquín Aguirre and the first cousin of José Joaquín Pérez and Juana Rosa Aguirre.

On 1 October 1826, Caldera married Ramón Freire, a military officer, politician and former Supreme Director of Chile. Caldera and Freire had four children, including

- Zenón Freire Caldera (1827–1898), politician; married Mercedes García de la Huerta Pérez
- Liborio Ramón Freire Caldera (1829–1884), politician; married Rosario García de la Huerta Pérez
- Francisco Freire (1839–1900), lawyer, farmer and politician; married Enriqueta Valdés Solar

Caldera was the great-grandmother of the diplomat Carmen Vial Freire Dows, and was the aunt of Nicolás Freire González, a Peruvian military officer and politician.

== Career ==
From 25 January 1827 Caldera served as the First Lady of Chile until her husband resigned on 8 May 1827. During the First Chilean Civil War, Freire fought on side of the liberal Pipiolos and became the President of the Governing Junta in November 1829. After Freire's defeat at the Battle of Lircay by Joaquín Prieto, Freire was arrested and sentenced to death. Caldera successfully positioned for her husband's death sentence to be commuted to ten years exile. Caldera wanted to join her husband in exile but he refused.

In 1842, Caldera's husband returned to Chile under amnesty. Upon Freire's return the families estate La Hacienda Cucha Cucha, which had been given to Freire for his contribution to Chilean independence, was expropriated causing the family financial problems. Following Ramón Freire's death in 1851, Caldera campaigned for the recognition of her husband's legacy. In 1852, Caldera and her youngest son Francisco were awarded a pension of 1125 CLP by President Manuel Montt.

Caldera died on 30 May 1865 and is buried at Santiago General Cemetery

Honorary titles
Preceded by Isabel Riquelme	First Lady of Chile; 25 January 1827 – 8 May 1827	Succeeded by Carmen Gana López
