= General Pinto (disambiguation) =

General Pinto is a town in Buenos Aires Province, Argentina. General Pinto may also refer to:

- Francisco Antonio Pinto (1785–1858), Chilean Army general
- Manuel Bulnes Pinto (1842–1899), Chilean Army general
- Manuel Guillermo Pinto (1783–1853), Argentine Army general
- Ottomar Pinto (1931–2007), Brazilian Air Force general
- WAG Pinto (1924–2021), Indian Army lieutenant general
