= Manuel Bulnes (disambiguation) =

Manuel Bulnes Prieto was president of Chile from 1841 to 1851.

Manuel Bulnes may also refer to:

- Manuel Bulnes Pinto (1842–1899), Chilean military officer and politician, son of Bulnes Prieto
- Manuel Bulnes Sanfuentes (1911–1975), Chilean politician, great-grandson of Bulnes Prieto
