= Eulogia Echaurren =

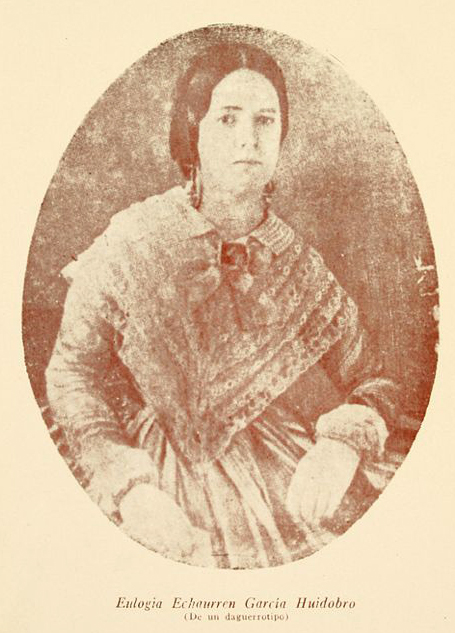
- 19th century photograph of Echaurren

First Lady of Chile
- In role September 18, 1871 – September 18, 1876
- President: Federico Errázuriz Zañartu
- Preceded by: Tránsito Florez de la Cavareda
- Succeeded by: Delfina de la Cruz

Personal details
- Born: Eulogia Echaurren García-Huidobro; 1830 Santiago, Chile
- Died: 27 April 1887 (aged 56–57) Santiago, Chile
- Resting place: Santiago General Cemetery
- Spouse: Federico Errázuriz Zañartu (m. 1848; died 1877)
- Children: 13 including, Federico Errázuriz Echaurren; María Errázuriz Echaurren
- Relatives: Gertrudis Echenique (daughter-in-law); Germán Riesco (son-in-law)

Eulogia Echaurren de Errázuriz (née García-Huidobro; 1830– 27 April 1887) the Chilean First Lady from 1871 to 1876.

== Biography ==
Eulogia Echaurren García-Huidobro was born in 1830 in Santiago to José Gregorio de Echaurren y Herrera and of Juana García-Huidobro y Aldunate.

On 24 August 1848, Echaurren married Federico Errázuriz Zañartu, a lawyer, politician and later 8th President of Chile.

Echaurren and Errázuriz had 13 children including:

- Federico Errázuriz Echaurren (1850 – 1901), politician and 13th President of Chile; married Gertrudis Echenique (1849 –1928), First Lady from 1896 to 1901.
- Javier Errázuriz Echaurren (1853–1913), a lawyer and politician; married Regina Mena Varas.
- Ladislao Errázuriz Echaurren (1856–1897), a farmer and politician; married Rosa Lazcano Echaurren.
- María Errázuriz Echaurren (1861–1922), the First Lady from 1901 to 1906; married Germán Riesco (1854 – 1916), lawyer, politician and 14th President of Chile.

On 27 April 1887 Echaurren died in Santiago, and is buried at the Santiago General Cemetery.

Honorary titles
| Preceded by Tránsito Florez de la Cavareda | First Lady of Chile; 1871–1876 | Succeeded by Delfina de la Cruz |
