= First Lady of Chile =

Wife or partner of the president of Chile

- Primera dama de Chile
- Flag of Chile

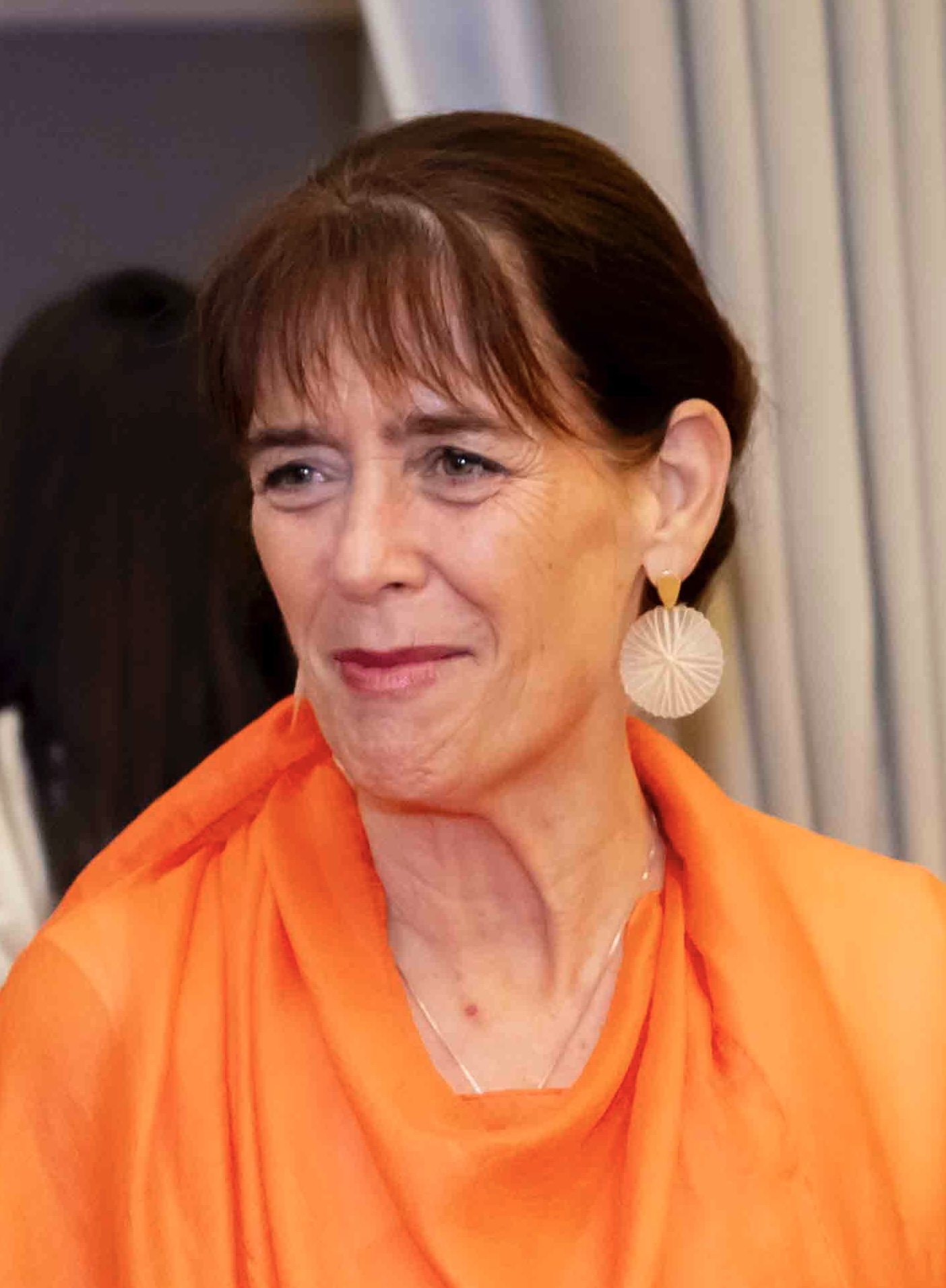
- Incumbent; María Pía Adriasola since March 11, 2026
- Residence: La Moneda Palace
- Inaugural holder: Mercedes Fontecilla
- Formation: 1811
- Website: Official website (in Spanish)

The first lady of Chile (Spanish: Primera dama de Chile) is wife of the president of Chile, who is traditionally responsible for directing and coordinating activities in the social field of the presidency and accompanying the president in ceremonies or official activities, including state visits. Although not an official title, it is widely used in formal protocol and has been used in some decrees.

== History ==
In colonial times, the wives of the royal governors (known also as "presidents") were called Presidentas. The title was still in use after Chile become a republic in the 19th century; the term, was slowly superseded by the newer First Lady, similar to the one used in other countries. (Note: The term Presidenta has been adopted in current times as the female version of Presidente, the title of President in Spanish (for example, when Michelle Bachelet assumed as the first female President of Chile in 2006).)

Due to the complex evolution of the head of state of Chile after the emancipation from Spain and the non-official character of the title, it is not possible to define who was the first first lady. Potential options include:

- María Nicolasa Valdés, wife of Mateo de Toro Zambrano, former royal governor and first president of the Government Junta (1810).
- Mercedes Fontecilla, wife of José Miguel Carrera, first commander-in-chief of the Chilean Army and president of the Provisional Government Junta (1811–1813)
- Isabel Riquelme, mother of Bernardo O'Higgins, first supreme director of Chile as an independent country (1818–1823).
- Carmen Gana, wife of Manuel Blanco Encalada, first president of the Republic of Chile (1826).

During the 19th and early 20th century, the first lady was considered one of the most influential figures of Chilean high society. As the wife of the president, the first ladies fulfilled the role as hostesses of ceremonies, especially after the president moved to the La Moneda Palace in 1845, and were in charge of the decoration of the presidential residences. Also, they participated in several charities and promoted different causes: Delfina de la Cruz and Emilia Márquez de la Plata, for example, organized events to support injured veterans, orphans and widowers caused by the War of the Pacific. In 1925, the First Lady had their own private office and staff, to support her role as the president of different charitable organizations created by the government.

During the 20th century, the role of the first lady increased, in line with the empowered role women had in politics and became more visible to the general public, not just for the high society. Juana Rosa Aguirre, wife of Pedro Aguirre Cerda (president between 1938 and 1941), promoted the adoption of women's suffrage and helped the people affected by the 1939 Chillán earthquake. Other foundations created by the First Ladies by the middle of the 20th century included the Ropero del Pueblo (1947–1958) and CEMA Chile (1967–1990).

At the moment, no male presidential spouse has existed. The title of First Gentleman (Primer Caballero) has been proposed for this case, although colloquially the term Primer Damo was used to refer to Bachelet's son Sebastián Dávalos when he acted as her representative.

== Vacancy ==
The role of the first lady has been vacant in six times, once by the death of the title holder and five times when the president has not been married. Usually in these cases, the role has been assumed by a close female relative.

- During Bernardo O'Higgins's rule as Supreme Director (1818-1823), his mother Isabel Riquelme acted in ceremonies similarly to a contemporary first lady.
- During Carlos Ibáñez del Campo's first presidency (1927-1931), before his marriage with Graciela Letelier in December 1927.
- During Arturo Alessandri's second presidency (1932-1938), after his wife Rosa Rodríguez Velasco died in 1936.
- During Jorge Alessandri's presidency (1958-1962), the role was assumed by Louise Schäffer, wife of Sótero del Río, his minister of Interior.
- During Michelle Bachelet's first presidency (2006-2010), the Director of the Social-Cultural Area of the Presidency was held first by former minister Adriana Delpiano and later by María Eugenia Hirmas, wife of minister Sergio Bitar. During her second presidency (2014-2018), the role was held first by her son Sebastián Dávalos and later by Paula Forttes. However, the ceremonial role of First Lady was unofficially fulfilled by Bachelet's mother, Ángela Jeria.
- During Gabriel Boric's presidency (2022-2026), the role was assumed by his girlfriend Irina Karamanos. Boric and Karamanos announced the end of their relationship in November 2023.

== Director of the Social-Cultural Area of the Presidency ==
Michelle Bachelet, a divorced woman, created an administrative position under her direct appointment, the director of the social-cultural area of the presidency, to absorb the different non-profit foundations of the presidency (Red de Fundaciones de la Presidencia de la República) that were traditionally managed by the first lady. The foundations included are Integra, Promoción y Desarrollo de la Mujer, Prodemu (Women's promotion and development); Fundación de la Familia; Tiempos Nuevos; Museo Interactivo Mirador; Matucana 100 Cultural Center; the Chilean Youth Orchestras; Artesanías de Chile (Arts and crafts) and Todo Chilenter.

== List of first ladies ==
Dates	Name	President	Parents
1810	María Nicolasa Valdés y Carrera	Mateo de Toro y Zambrano y Ureta	Domingo Valdés y González-Soberal and Francisca de Borja de la Carrera y Ureta
1811–1813	María Mercedes Fontecilla Valdivieso	José Miguel Carrera Verdugo	Diego Antonio Fontecilla Palacios and Rosa Valdivieso Portusagasti
1818–1823	Isabel Riquelme y Meza (Note: O'Higgins was single. The role of First Lady was assumed unofficially by his mother.)	Bernardo O'Higgins Riquelme	Simón Riquelme de la Barrera y Goycochea and María Mercedes de Meza y Ulloa
1823–1826	Manuela Caldera	Ramón Freire Serrano	Francisco de Paula Caldera y Fontecilla-Palacios and Micaela Mascayano Larraín
1826	Carmen Gana López	Manuel Blanco Encalada	Agustín Gana Darrigrande and Dolores López Guerrero
1826–1827	María Teresa de Larraín y Guzmán	Agustín Manuel de Eyzaguirre y Arechavala	Agustín de Larraín y Lecaros and of Ana Josefa de Guzmán Peralta y Lecaros
1827–1829	Luisa Garmendia	Francisco Antonio Pinto Díaz	Ignacio Garmendia y Aguirre and María Elena de Aldurralde y Villagrán
1829	Mariana de Aguirre y Boza	Francisco Ramón Vicuña Larraín	José Santos de Aguirre y Díez de Aséndegui and Antonia de Boza de Lima y Andía-Irarrázaval
1830–1831	Rafaela Bezanilla Bezanilla	José Tomás Ovalle y Bezanilla	Francisco Bezanilla y De la Bárcena y Juana Bezanilla y Abós-Padilla
1831	María del Carmen Sotomayor Elzo	Fernando de Errázuriz y Martínez de Aldunate	Francisco Sotomayor Serrano and María de la Concepción de Elzo y Ureta
1831–1841	Manuela Warnes	José Joaquín Prieto Vial	Manuel Antonio Warnes y Durango and Ana Jacoba García de Zúñiga y Lizola
1841–1851	Enriqueta Pinto Garmendia	Manuel Bulnes Prieto	Ex presidente Francisco Antonio Pinto and the ex-First Lady Luisa Garmendia
1851–1861	Rosario Montt	Manuel Montt Torres	Filiberto Montt y Prado and Luz Goyenechea Sierra.
1861–1871	Tránsito Florez de la Cavareda	José Joaquín Pérez Mascayano	Antonio Flores y Toro Zambrano and Micaela de la Cavareda y Trucíos
1871–1876	Eulogia Echaurren García-Huidrobro	Federico Errázuriz Zañartu	José Gregorio de Echaurren y Herrera and Juana García de Huidobro y Aldunate
1876–1881	Delfina de la Cruz Zañartu	Anibal Pinto Garmendia	José María de la Cruz Prieto and Josefa Zañartu Trujillo
1881–1886	Emilia Márquez de la Plata	Domingo Santa María González	Fernando Márquez de la Plata Encalada and María del Carmen Guzmán y Fontecilla
1886-1891	Emilia de Toro	José Manuel Balmaceda Fernández	Domingo José Francisco Rafael de Toro y Valdés and María Mercedes Guzmán y Lecaros
1891–1896	Leonor Frederick	Jorge Montt Álvarez	Jonathan Frederick Winthon and Nieves Ledesma Varas
1896-1901	Gertrudis Echenique Mujica	Federico Errázuriz Echaurren	Juan José Echenique Bascuñán and Jesús Mujica Echaurren
1901–1906	María Errázuriz Echaurren	Germán Riesco Errázuriz	Ex presidente Federico Errázuriz Zañartu and the ex-First Lady Eulogia Echaurren García-Huidrobro
1906-1910	Sara del Campo Yávar	Pedro Montt Montt	Evaristo del Campo Madariaga and Antonia Yávar Ruiz de Cabrera
1910–1915	Mercedes Valdés Cuevas	Ramón Barros Luco	Francisco de Borja Valdés Aldunate and Alejandra Cuevas Avaria
1915–1920	Ana Echazarreta Pérez-Cotapos	Juan Luis Sanfuentes Andonaegui	Juan Manuel Echazarreta Irigoyen and Mercedes Pérez-Cotapos Recabarren
1920–1925	Rosa Rodríguez Velasco	Artuto Alessandri Palma	José Antonio Rodríguez Velasco and Antonia Velasco Pérez-Cotapos
1925–1927	Leonor Sánchez	Emiliano Figueroa Larraín	Teodoro Sánchez Foulkner and Teresa Vicuña Vicuña
1927–1931	Graciela Letelier	Carlos Ibáñez del Campo	Ricardo Letelier Silva and Margarita Velasco Urzúa
1931–1932	Graciela Fehrman	Juan Esteban Montero Rodríguez	Eduardo Fehrman Zúñiga and Adelaida Martínez Prado
1932	Herminia Arrate	Carlos Dávila Espinoza	Miguel Arrate Larraín and Delia Ramírez Molina
1932–1938	Rosa Rodríguez Velasco	Arturo Alessandri Palma	José Antonio Rodríguez Velasco and Antonia Velasco Pérez-Cotapos
1938-1941	Juana Rosa Aguirre Luco	Pedro Aguirre Cerda	José Joaquín Aguirre Campos and Mercedes Luco Gutiérrez
1942-1946	Marta Ide Pereira	Juan Antonio Ríos Morales	Carlos Jorge Ide Schulz and Juana Pereira Ahuer
1946–1952	Rosa Markmann Reijer	Gabriel González Videla	Ladislao Markmann Villagrán and Ana Reijer Silva
1952–1958	Graciela Letelier	Carlos Ibáñez del Campo	Ricardo Letelier Silva and Margarita Velasco Urzúa
1958–1964	None (Note: Alessandri was single; role was assumed by Louise Schäffer, wife of minister Sótero del Río.)	Jorge Alessandri Rodríguez	
1964–1970	María Ruiz-Tagle	Eduardo Frei Montalva	Alfredo Ruiz-Tagle Adriasola and Claudia Jiménez Pérez de Arce
1970-1973	Hortensia Bussi Soto	Salvador Allende Gossens	Ciro Bussi Aguilera and Mercedes Soto García
1973–1990	María Lucía Hiriart Rodríguez	Augusto Pinochet Ugarte	Osvaldo Hiriart Corvalán and Lucía Rodríguez Auda
1990–1994	Leonor Oyarzún Ivanovic	Patricio Aylwin Azócar	Manuel Oyarzún Lorca and Ana Ivanovic Roccatagliata
1994–2000	Marta Larraechea Bolívar	Eduardo Frei Ruiz-Tagle	Vasco de Larraechea Herrera and Victoria Bolívar Le Fort
2000–2006	Luisa Durán de la Fuente	Ricardo Lagos Escobar	Hernán Durán Morales and Luisa de la Fuente Tavolara
2006–2010	None (Note: Michelle Bachelet was divorced. The role of First Lady was unofficially held by her mother, Ángela Jeria, in ceremonies. However, the role of Director of the social-cultural area of the Presidency was assumed by Adriana Delpiano (2006-2007) and María Eugenia Hirmas (2007-2010).)	Michelle Bachelet	
2010–2014	Cecilia Morel Montes	Sebastián Piñera Echenique	Eduardo Morel Chaigneau and Paulina Montes Brunet
2014–2018	None (Note: Michelle Bachelet was divorced. The role of Director of the social-cultural area of the Presidency was assumed by her son Sebastián Dávalos (2014-2015) and later by Paula Forttes (2015-2018).)	Michelle Bachelet	
2018–2022	Cecilia Morel Montes	Sebastián Piñera Echenique	Eduardo Morel Chaigneau and Paulina Montes Brunet
2022	Irina Karamanos Adrian (Note: Boric and Karamanos were not married. Karamanos announced her departure from the government on December 29, 2022, while the Presidency's Sociocultural Coordination was dissolved two days later.)	Gabriel Boric Font	Jorge Karamanos and Sabine Adrian
2022–2026	None	Gabriel Boric Font	Jorge Karamanos and Sabine Adrian
2026-present	María Pía Adriasola	José Antonio Kast Rist	Fernando Adriasola Navarrete and Teresa Barroilhet Amenábar
