= Manuela Warnes =

Argentine socialite and First Lady of Chile (1776–1858)

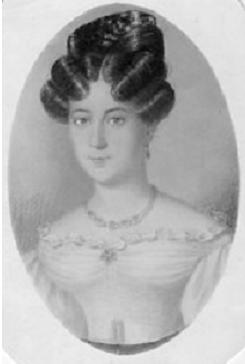

First Lady of Chile
- In role 18 September 1831 – 18 September 1841
- President: Joaquín Prieto
- Preceded by: María del Carmen Sotomayor
- Succeeded by: Enriqueta Pinto

Personal details
- Born: Manuela Warnes y García de Zúñiga; 3 October 1776 Buenos Aires, Viceroyalty of the Río de la Plata, Spanish Empire
- Died: 15 March 1858 (aged 81) Santiago, Chile
- Spouse: Joaquín Prieto (m. 1812; died 1854)
- Relations: Ignacio Warnes (brother); Joaquín Prieto Concha (great-grandson); Camilo Prieto Concha (great-grandson)
- Children: 2
- Parent: Manuel Antonio Warnes (father)

Manuela Josefa Warnes de Prieto (née Warnes y García de Zúñiga; 13 October 1776 – 15 March 1858) was an Argentine socialite who served as the First Lady of Chile from 1831 to 1841.

== Early life and family ==
Warnes was born Manuela Josefa Warnes y García de Zúñiga on 13 October 1776 in Buenos Aires, Viceroyalty of the Río de la Plata (present-day, Argentina) to Manuel Antonio Warnes, a Spanish Army officer and politician, and Ana Jacoba García de Zúñiga. One of sixteen children, Warnes was the younger sister of Ignacio Warnes and the older sister of Martina Warnes and Martín José Warnes.

On 25 July 1812, Warnes married Joaquín Prieto, a military officer, politician and future 4th President of Chile. Warnes and Prieto had two children, including the politician Joaquín Prieto Warnes. Warnes was the grandmother of Joaquín Prieto Hurtado, a lawyer and politician, and was the great-grandmother of the politicians Joaquín Prieto Concha and Camilo Prieto Concha.

Following her husband's death in 1854, Warnes was awarded an annual pension of 625 CLP by President Manuel Montt.

On 15 March 1858, Warnes died in Santiago aged 81. Warnes is buried at Santiago General Cemetery.

Honorary titles
Preceded by María del Carmen Sotomayor	First Lady of Chile; 18 September 1831 – 18 September 1841	Succeeded by Enriqueta Pinto
