= Domingo Eyzaguirre =

Chilean politician and philanthropist

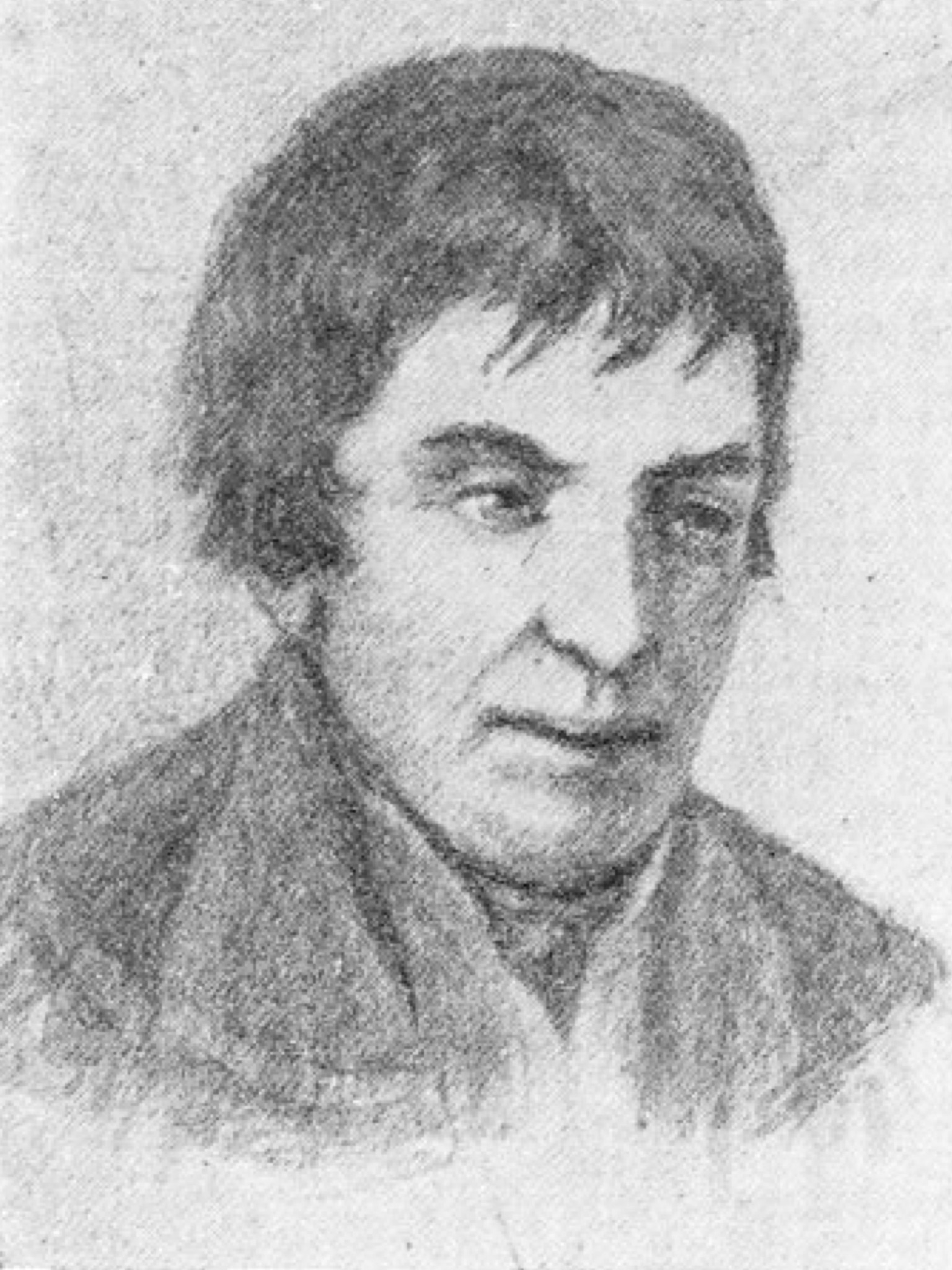

Member of the Chamber of Deputies
- In office 1 July 1831 – 31 May 1837

Personal details
- Born: 17 July 1775 Santiago, Viceroyalty of Peru
- Died: 22 April 1854 (aged 78) Santiago, Chile
- Occupation: Politician

Domingo de Eyzaguirre y Arechavala (July 17, 1775 – April 22, 1854) was a Chilean politician and philanthropist.

== Biography ==
He was born in Santiago, Viceroyalty of Peru, the son of the Basque Domingo Eyzaguirre Escutasolo and of María Rosa de Arechavala y Alday. He studied in the seminary of his native City, and showed remarkable aptitude for mathematics and chemistry. When scarcely nineteen years old he was appointed as assayer of the royal mint of Santiago, but resigned the next year, and devoted himself entirely to the cultivation of a farm near Santiago, inherited from his father.

There his labors tended more to the improvement of the condition of the laboring classes than to his own pecuniary interest. He improved the yield of some of the poorest lands by his knowledge of chemistry, introduced modern agricultural implements, and, by giving his laborers better than the accustomed wages and caring for their moral and material welfare, soon assembled a colony of well to do and contented people. He also introduced looms, which, although imperfect, served to weave from native wool the coarse cloth worn by the peasantry.

From the first years of his country life he agitated the project of a canal to water the barren plain surrounding Santiago, which had been begun some time before, but was abandoned. The Spanish government approved the plan, and in 1802 made Eyzaguirre director. He pushed the work with energy until it was interrupted by the revolution of 1810, and notwithstanding he sympathized with the patriotic cause, he abstained from any participation.

His prestige as an honorable and impartial man was so great that, even when his brothers were exiled, he suffered no persecution from the Spanish authorities, and was enabled to alleviate the sufferings of his compatriots. When the independence of Chile was finally established in 1817, he resumed his favorite work, and in 1820, amid great festivities, the canal of Maipo was opened. This, with many smaller lateral canals, soon converted the arid plain into a fertile garden. It was placed by the government under the administration of a board, of which Eyzaguirre was appointed president.

In 1823 he was commissioned to reorganize the charitable institutions, and undertook the task of building a home for wayfarers and needy persons. Within a few years he had collected the necessary means, and a new and commodious building was erected.

In 1835 he was appointed first governor of the department of Victoria, the capital of which he had founded and spent a good part of his fortune in improving. He established the agricultural society in 1838, and was elected its president. He was several times deputy to the National congress, where he soon became noted for his honesty.

In 1845 he attempted to establish a socialistic colony in the country, where all should share the labor and produce, but soon dissensions broke out, and the project failed. A few years later he undertook to establish a large cloth factory, with the object of improving the condition of the poor and giving occupation to women and children. In this enterprise he invested the greater part of his fortune, but before the factory was finished he died. The Maipo canal board erected a statue to his memory.

== See also ==
- Agustin Eyzaguirre
- History of Chile
