= María Errázuriz =

María Errázuriz Echaurren
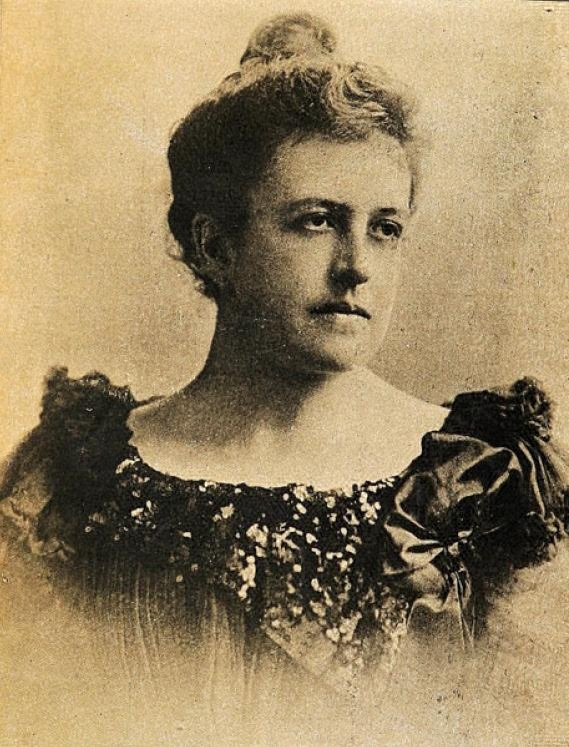

First Lady of Chile
- In role 18 September 1901 – 18 September 1906
- President: Germán Riesco Errázuriz
- Preceded by: Gertrudis Echenique Mujica
- Succeeded by: Sara del Campo

Personal details
- Born: María Errázuriz Echaurren; 1861 Santiago, Chile
- Died: 1 May 1922 (aged 60–61)
- Spouse: Germán Riesco Errázuriz (m. 1880; died 1916)
- Children: 8, including Germán Ignacio Riesco Errázuriz
- Parent(s): Federico Errázuriz Zañartu; Eulogia Echaurren

María Errázuriz Echaurren (1861 – 1 May 1922) was First Lady of Chile and the wife of President Germán Riesco Errázuriz.

She was born in Santiago, the daughter of President Federico Errázuriz Zañartu and former First Lady Eulogia Echaurren García-Huidobro, and sister of President Federico Errázuriz Echaurren. On 7 January 1880, she married Germán Riesco, her first cousin via her father's sister, Carlota Errázuriz Zañartu. The couple had eight children together, including Germán Ignacio Riesco Errázuriz, a twice-appointed Minister of Chile.

Honorary titles
Preceded by Gertrudis Echenique Mujica	First Lady of Chile; 1901–1906	Succeeded by Sara del Campo
