= María del Carmen Sotomayor =

María del Carmen Sotomayor Elzo
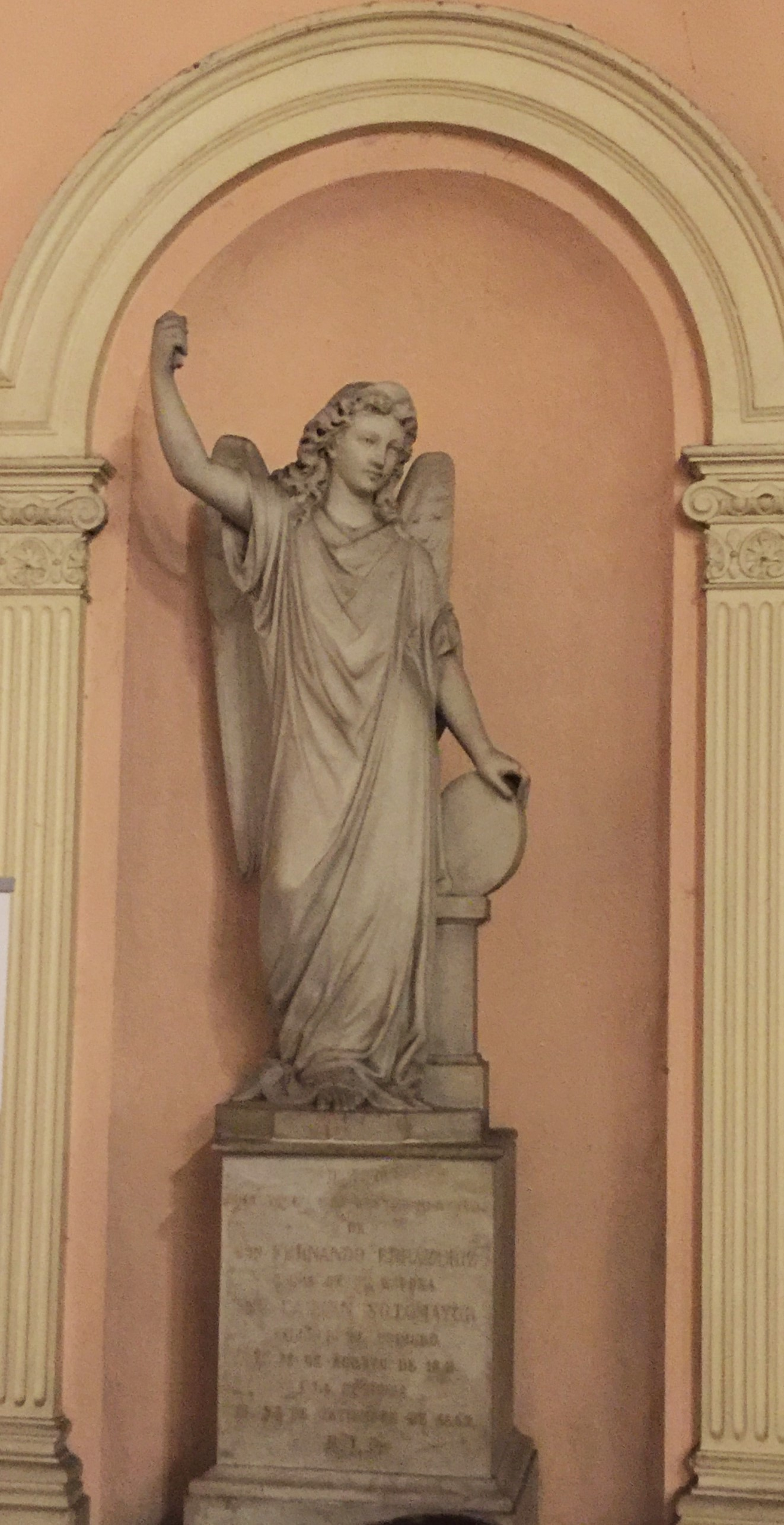

First Lady of Chile
- In role 8 March 1831 – 18 September 1831
- President: Fernando Errázuriz Aldunate
- Preceded by: Rafaela Bezanilla
- Succeeded by: Manuela Warnes

Personal details
- Born: María del Carmen Sotomayor Elzo c. 1780 Rancagua, Chile
- Died: 24 September 1852 (aged 71–72) Santiago, Chile
- Spouse: Fernando Errázuriz Aldunate (m. 1801)
- Children: 8
- Parent(s): Francisco Sotomayor Serrano; María de la Concepción de Elzo y Ureta

María del Carmen Sotomayor Elzo (c.1780 – 24 September 1852) was First Lady of Chile.

She was born in Rancagua, the daughter of Francisco Sotomayor Serrano and of María de la Concepción de Elzo y Ureta, woman of Basque descent. She married Fernando de Errázuriz y Martínez de Aldunate, served as provisional president of Chile in 1831, in Santiago on 2 October 1801, with whom he had 8 children. She died in the same city in 1852.

== See also ==
- First Lady of Chile

Honorary titles
Preceded by Rafaela Bezanilla	First Lady of Chile; 1831	Succeeded by Manuela Warnes
