= Carmen Gana López =

Chilean first lady

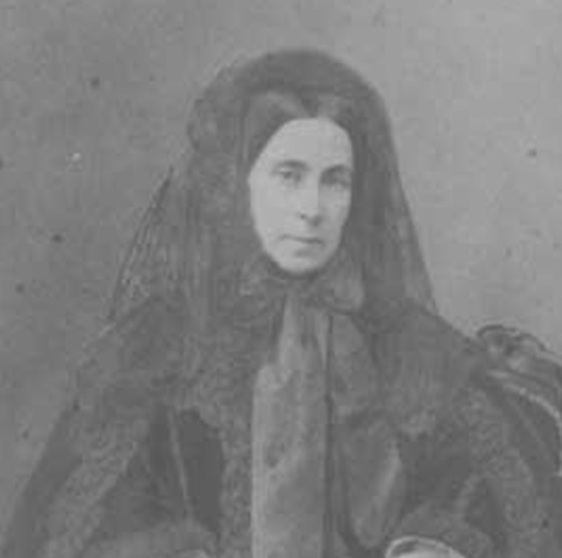

First Lady of Chile
- In role 19 July 1826 – 9 September 1826
- President: Manuel Blanco Encalada
- Preceded by: Manuela Caldera
- Succeeded by: Teresa Larraín

Personal details
- Born: 1800
- Died: 15 April 1880 (aged 79–80)
- Spouse: Manuel Blanco Encalada (m. 1818; died 1876)
- Children: 6

María del Carmen Gana López (1800 – 15 April 1880) was a Chilean aristocrat and a First Lady of Chile.

== Biography ==
Gana López was the daughter of Agustín Domingo Gana y Darrigrande and María Dolores López y Guerrero Villaseñor. On 29 November 1818 she married Manuel Blanco Encalada. The couple had six children. Throughout her husband's political career, she was regarded as one of his closest confidants and advisers.

Blanco Encalada acted as interim President of Chile from 9 July 1826 until 9 September 1826, during which period Gana served as First Lady of Chile. Despite the brief duration of her tenure, she supported initiatives in the field of social welfare. On her encouragement, her husband allowed the Congregation of the Good Shepherd, a Catholic religious order, to establish the first orphanage in San Felipe.

During her husband's tenure as minister to France, the family lived in Paris, where their home became a meeting place for visitors from the Americas and Europe. Gana also maintained close relations with a number of Parisian artists and intellectuals.

While in Paris, Gana's daughter Teresa married a wealthy Chilean man. Teresa's godparents at the wedding ceremony were Napoleon III and Eugénie de Montijo. Gana maintained regular correspondence with the couple even after her return to Santiago.

Gana died on 15 April 1880 and is buried in the Cementerio General de Santiago.

Honorary titles
Preceded by Manuela Caldera	First Lady of Chile; 1826–1826	Succeeded by Teresa Larraín
