= Mercedes Valdés Cuevas =

Chilean philanthropist and First Lady (1843–1926)

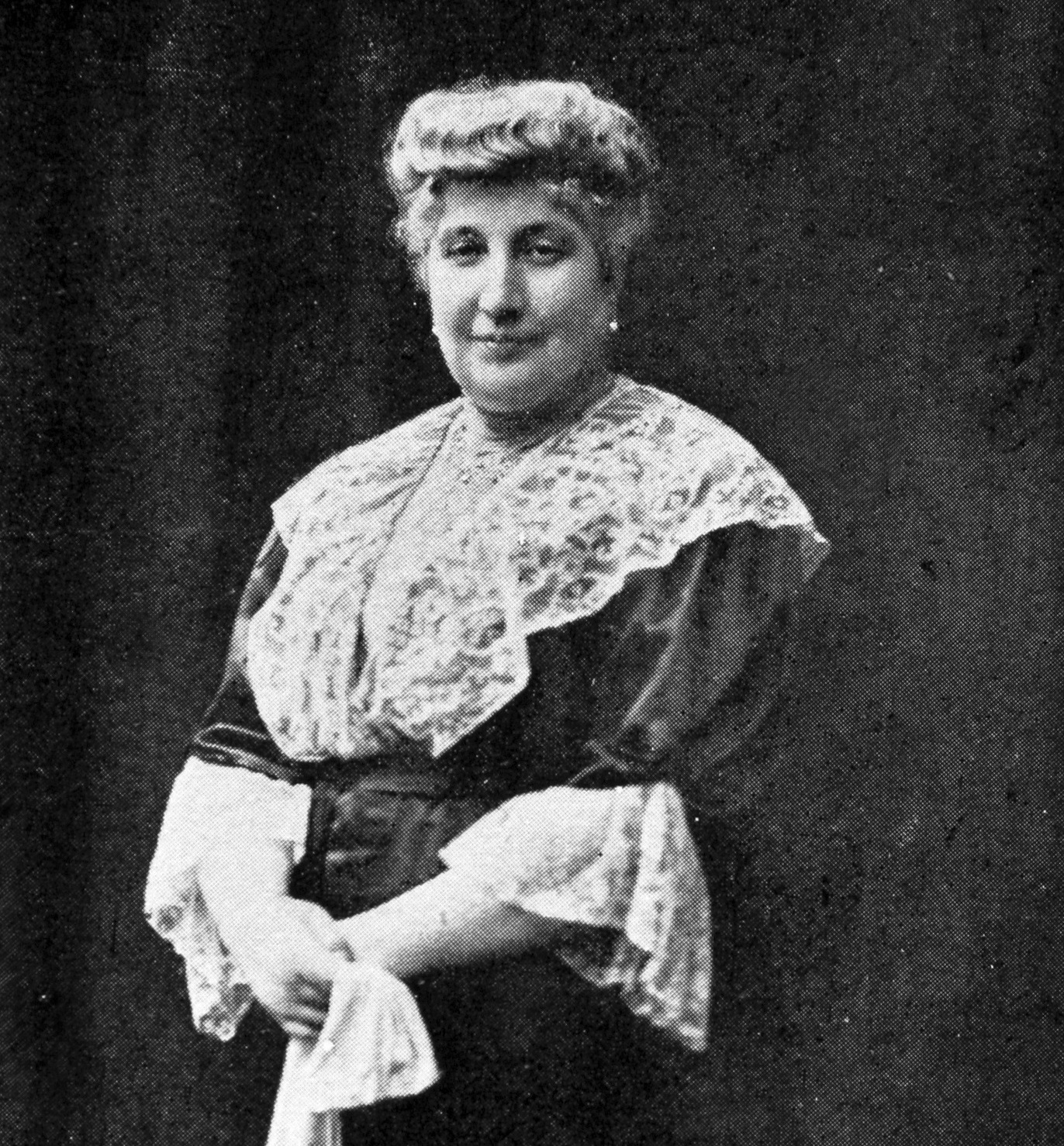

First Lady of Chile
- In role 1910–1915
- President: Ramón Barros Luco
- Preceded by: Sara del Campo
- Succeeded by: Ana Echazarreta

Personal details
- Born: Mercedes Valdés Cuevas; 1843
- Died: 4 September 1926 (aged 82–83)
- Resting place: Santiago General Cemetery
- Spouse: Ramón Barros Luco (m. 1895; died 1919)

Mercedes Valdés Cuevas de Barros Luco (née Valdés Cuevas; 1843 – 4 September 1926) was a Chilean philanthropist and First Lady during 1910 to 1915.

== Biography ==
Valdés was born in 1843 in Santiago to Francisco de Borja Valdés Aldunate and Alejandra Cuevas Avaria. Through her father Valdés was a member of the Chilean Valdés family. Valdés was the sister of the politicians Francisco de Borja Valdés and José Florencio Valdés Cuevas.

In 1895, Valdés married Ramón Barros Luco, a lawyer, politician and future 16th President of Chile.

Following her husband's death in 1919, Valdés gave a sufficient donation to the Hospital Barros Luco Trudeau.

On 4 September 1926 Valdés died in Santiago. Upon her death Valdés bequeathed her assets to the Institute of Evangelical Charity "Fraternity of Sorrows" (Spanish: Instituto de Caridad Evangélica Hermandad de Dolores), Santiago Charity Board (Spanish: Junta de Beneficencia de Santiago) and the Hospital Barros Luco Trudeau. Valdés was buried at the Santiago General Cemetery.

Honorary titles
Preceded by Sara del Campo	First Lady of Chile; 1910–1915	Succeeded by Ana Echazarreta
