= Sara del Campo =

First Lady of Chile

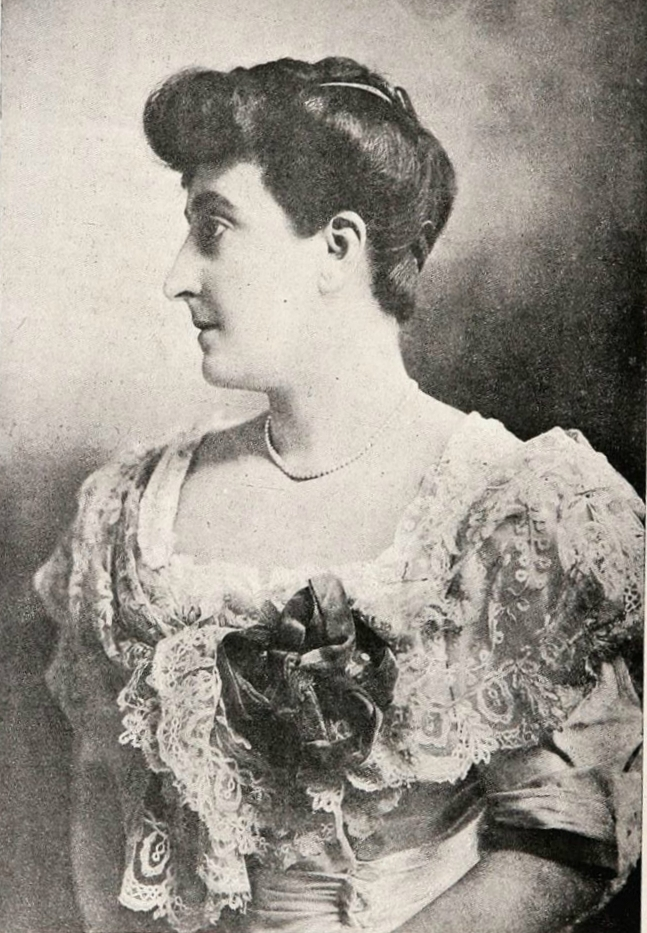

First Lady of Chile
- In role 18 September 1906 – 16 August 1910
- President: Pedro Montt
- Preceded by: María Errázuriz
- Succeeded by: Mercedes Valdés Cuevas

Personal details
- Born: Sara del Campo Yávar; 31 December 1855 Santiago, Chile
- Died: 30 August 1942 (aged 86) Santiago, Chile
- Spouse: Pedro Montt (m. 1881; died 1910)
- Parent(s): Evaristo del Campo Madariaga; Antonia Yávar Ruiz de Cabrera

Sara del Campo Yávar (31 December 1855 in Santiago – 30 August 1942 in Santiago) was First Lady of Chile from 1906 to 1910, and the wife of President Pedro Montt.

She was the daughter of Evaristo del Campo Madariaga and of Antonia Yávar Ruiz de Cabrera. She married Pedro Montt on January 3, 1881, but they had no descendants.

== See also ==
- Montt family

Honorary titles
| Preceded by María Errázuriz | First Lady of Chile; 1906–1910 | Succeeded by Mercedes Valdés Cuevas |
