= Rafaela Bezanilla =

First Lady of Chile (1797–1855)

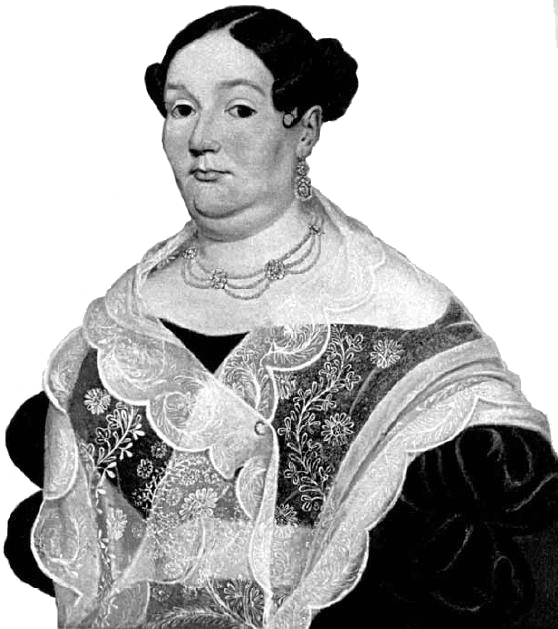

First Lady of Chile
- In role 24 December 1829 – 24 December 1829
- President: José Tomás Ovalle
- Preceded by: Mariana de Aguirre
- Succeeded by: María del Carmen Sotomayor

Personal details
- Born: Rafaela Bezanilla Bezanilla; 1797 Santiago, Viceroyalty of Peru
- Died: 7 May 1855 (aged 57–58)
- Spouse: José Tomás Ovalle
- Children: 8
- Parent(s): Francisco de Bezanilla y de la Bárcena; Juana Bezanilla y Abós Padilla

Rafaela Bezanilla Bezanilla (1797 – 7 May 1855) was First Lady of Chile and the wife of President José Tomás Ovalle y Bezanilla. She was born in Santiago, the daughter of Francisco de Bezanilla y de la Bárcena and of Juana Bezanilla y Abós Padilla. She and her husband had eight children together.

Honorary titles
Preceded by Mariana de Aguirre	First Lady of Chile; 1829	Succeeded by María del Carmen Sotomayor
