= Mariana de Aguirre =

First Lady of Chile
- In role 2 November 1829 – 7 December 1829
- President: Francisco Ramón Vicuña
- Preceded by: Luisa Garmendia
- Succeeded by: Rafaela Bezanilla

Personal details
- Born: Mariana Viviana de Aguirre y Bosa; 1775 Chile
- Spouse: Francisco Ramón Vicuña
- Children: 11
- Parent(s): José Santos de Aguirre y Díez de Aséndegui; Antonia de Bosa de Lima y Andía-Irarrázaval

Mariana Viviana de Aguirre y Bosa (baptised 3 December 1775) was First Lady of Chile as wife of Chile's President Francisco Ramón Vicuña (1775–1849), with whom she had six children.

She was born in Santiago, Chile to father José Santos de Aguirre y Díez de Aséndegui, 2nd Marquis of Montepío, and mother Antonia de Bosa de Lima y Andía-Irarrázaval.

== See also ==
- Figueroa mutiny
- Vicuña family

Honorary titles
Preceded by Luisa Garmendia	First Lady of Chile; 1829	Succeeded by Rafaela Bezanilla
