= Government Junta of Chile (1823) =

Short-lived Chilean government

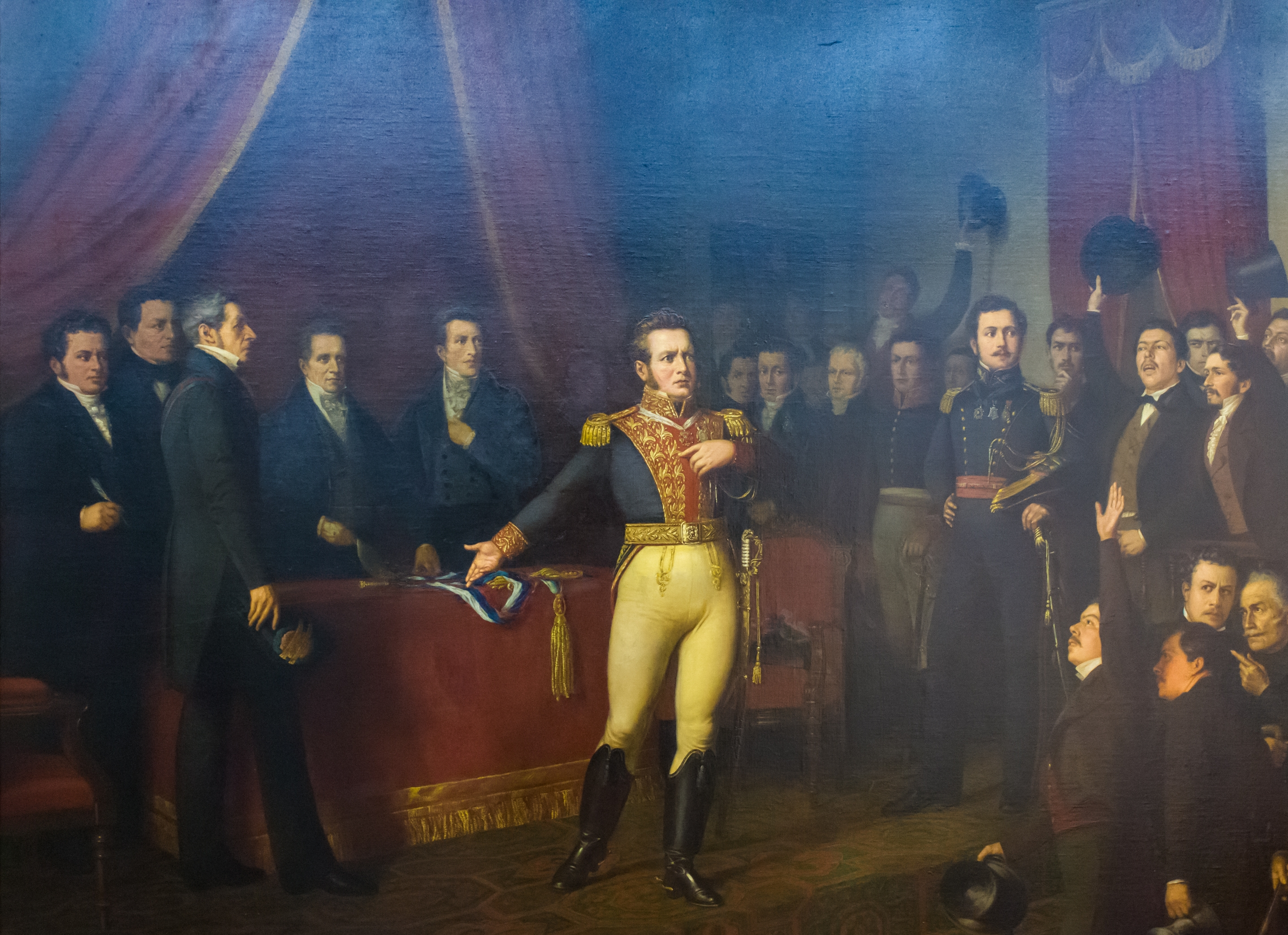
Bernardo O'Higgins resigns his position as Supreme Director

Government Junta of Chile (Spanish: Junta de Representantes) (January 28, 1823 – March 29, 1823), was the political structure established to rule Chile following the resignation of Supreme Director Bernardo O'Higgins. It ruled the country until April 4, 1823, when Ramón Freire assumed as the new Supreme Director.

== Creation ==
During most of 1822, Chile had grown increasingly opposed to the conservative rule of Bernardo O'Higgins, and especially to the economic policies of his minister José Antonio Rodríguez Aldea, who was widely accused of widespread corruption. The situation came to a head on January 28, 1823, when O'Higgins, in a very emotional speech and with the objective of preventing a civil war, voluntarily resigned his position in front of a convention of the principal citizens of Santiago. The power was vested then on the hands of a Government Junta, that was to rule until power could be transferred to a new Supreme Director, to be selected with the consent of the rest of the provinces.

== Members ==
Position	Name
President	Agustín de Eyzaguirre y Arechavala
Member	Fernando Errázuriz Aldunate
Member	José Miguel Infante y Rojas

== History ==
The Junta was composed of the principal representatives of the various factions that were vying for power. Agustín Eyzaguirre was elected president, with Fernando Errázuriz and José Miguel Infante as members. This Junta only functioned until March 29, 1823, when it designated General Ramón Freire as the new Supreme Director and proceeded to dissolve itself.

Nonetheless, General Freire was not in Santiago at the time of his nomination, so power was assumed by a "Plenipotentiaries Congress" made up of representatives of the three provinces in which the country was divided then. This "congress" held power for a week until the arrival of General Freire and his assumption of executive power on April 4 (some authors consider April 5 as the actual date), of 1823.

== Additional information ==
=== See also ===
- History of Chile
- List of Government Juntas of Chile
- List of Heads of State
