= Ana Echazarreta =

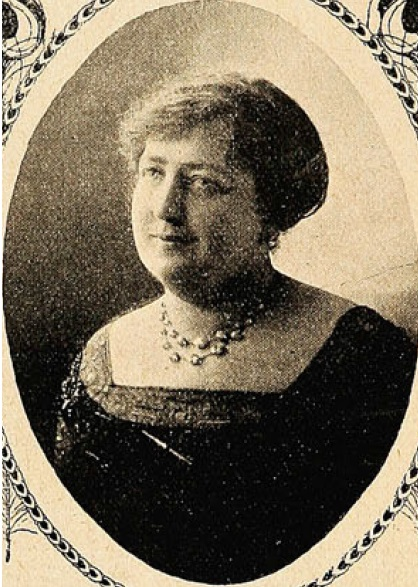

First Lady of Chile
- In role 23 December 1915 – 23 December 1920
- President: Juan Luis Sanfuentes
- Preceded by: Mercedes Valdés Cuevas
- Succeeded by: Rosa Ester Rodríguez

Personal details
- Born: Ana Josefa María de las Echazarreta Pérez Cotapos; 21 March 1864 Santiago, Chile
- Died: 25 May 1927 (aged 63) Santiago, Chile
- Spouse: Juan Luis Sanfuentes (m. 1885)
- Children: 5
- Parent(s): Juan Manuel Echazarreta Yrigoyen; Mercedes Pérez Cotapos Recabarren

Ana Josefa María de las Echazarreta Pérez Cotapos (baptised 21 March 1864 – May 25, 1927) was a First Lady of Chile.

Ana Echazarreta was born in Santiago, the daughter of Juan Manuel Echazarreta Yrigoyen and of Mercedes Pérez Cotapos Recabarren. She married Juan Luis Sanfuentes Andonaegui on November 11, 1885, and together they had five children. She died in Santiago.

== See also ==
- First Lady of Chile

Honorary titles
Preceded by Mercedes Valdés Cuevas	First Lady of Chile; 1915–1920	Succeeded by Rosa Ester Rodríguez Velasco
