= Gilbert Médioni =

French diplomat and anthropologist (1902–1994)

- Born: Henri Gilbert Lucien Rodolphe Médioni; 14 June 1902; Constantine, French Algeria
- Died: 16 May 1994 (aged 91); Paris, France
- Occupations: Diplomat; physician
- Spouse: Marie-Thérèse Pinto
- Family: Pinto family

Henri Gilbert Lucien Rodolphe Médioni (14 June 1902 – 16 May 1994), known as Gilbert Médioni, was a French diplomat, physician, Mesoamerican anthropologist and artist.

== Early life ==
Henri Gilbert Lucien Rodolphe Médioni was born on 14 June 1902 in Constantine, French Algeria (present day, Algeria).

== Career ==
=== Diplomacy ===
Together with Jacques Soustelle, Médioni founded and led the Free French delegation in Mexico City.

On 22 September 1943, Médioni was named the French Committee of National Liberation (CFLN) Minister to Central America (Note: Guatemala, Nicaragua, Costa Rica, El Salvador and Honduras.) and was based in Guatemala. In October 1944, Médioni became the Minister for the Provisional Government Minister for Central America. From 5 April 1945 to August 1947 Médioni was the Minister, Special envoy and Plenipotentiary for Central America.

On 19 May 1946 Médioni became the chargé d'affaires to Venezuela. On 19 October 1953, Médioni became the French ambassador to Liberia.

=== Anthropology ===
In 1941, Médioni and Marie-Thérèse Pinto published Art in Ancient Mexico: Selected and Photographed from the Collection of Diego Rivera, which presented Diego Riveras collection of pre-Columbian sculptures. The book is known to have influenced the work of the Chilean sculptors Lily Garafulic, Rosa Vicuña, Teresa Vicuña and Marta Colvin.

== Personal life ==
Médioni married Marie-Thérèse Pinto, a Chilean sculptor.

On 16 May 1994 Médioni died in the 6th arrondissement of Paris, aged 91.

== Bibliography ==
- Médioni, Gilbert; Pinto, Marie-Thérèse (1941). Art in Ancient Mexico: Selected and Photographed from the Collection of Diego Rivera. Oxford: Oxford University Press.
- Médioni, Gilbert (1950). Art maya du Mexique et du Guatemala, Ancien empire (in French). Paris: La Cyme.
- Médioni, Gilbert (1952). L'art Tarasque du Mexique occidental (in French). Paris: Paul Hartmann.
