= Teresa Larraín =

First Lady of Chile
- In role September 9, 1826 – January 25, 1827
- President: Agustín Eyzaguirre
- Preceded by: Carmen Gana López
- Succeeded by: Luisa Garmendia

Personal details
- Born: María Teresa de Larraín y Guzmán Peralta Santiago, Chile
- Died: 1828 (aged 42–43)
- Spouse: Agustín Eyzaguirre (m. 1808)
- Children: 10
- Parent(s): Agustín de Larraín y Lecaros; Ana Josefa de Guzmán Peralta y Lecaros

María Teresa de Larraín y Guzmán Peralta (March 2, 1785 - 1828) was the First Lady of Chile as the wife of President Agustín Eyzaguirre. She was of Basque descent.

She was born in Santiago, the daughter of Agustín de Larraín y Lecaros and of Ana Josefa de Guzmán Peralta y Lecaros. With her husband, they had ten children together.

== Additional information ==
=== See also ===
- First Ladies of Chile

Honorary titles
Preceded by Carmen Gana López	First Lady of Chile; 1826–1827	Succeeded by Luisa Garmendia
