= José Joaquín Aguirre =

Chilean medic, politician and educator (1822–1901)

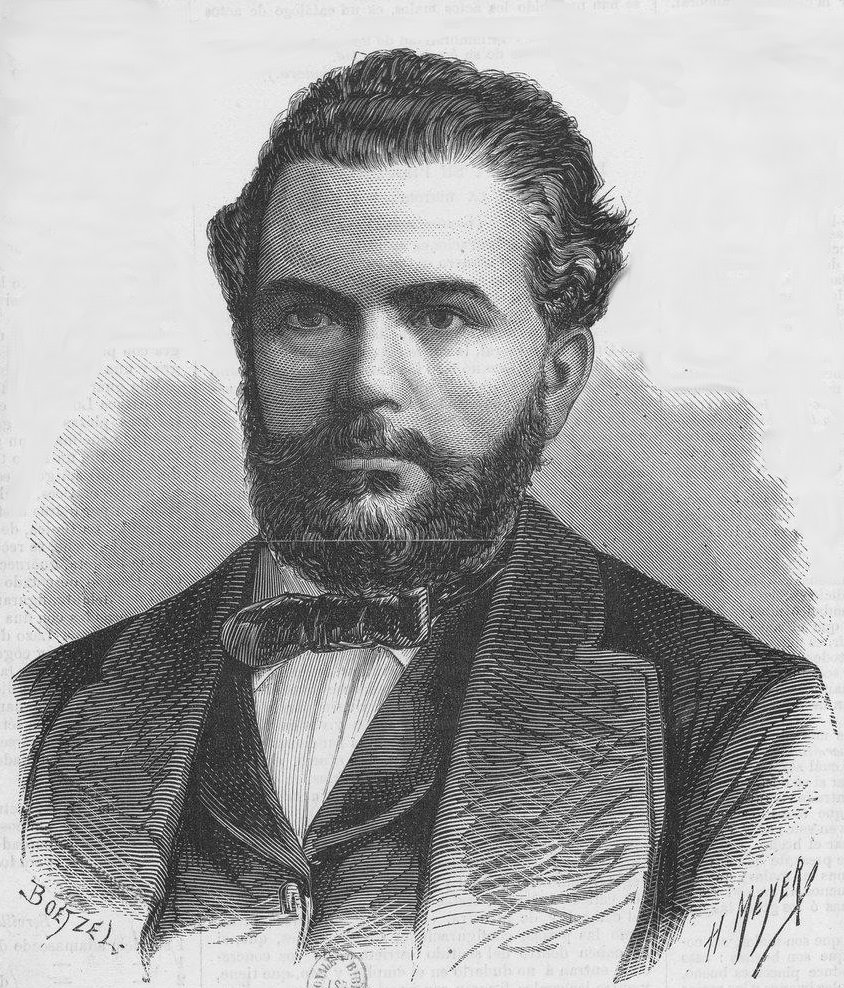
José Joaquín Aguirre

José Joaquín Aguirre Campos (1822 in Los Andes – 22 January 1901 in Cartagena) was a Chilean medic, politician and educator. He married Mercedes Luco Gutiérrez and is father of the First Lady of Chile Juana Rosa Aguirre.

A disciple of Sazié, he excelled early in internal medicine and surgery. José Joaquín Aguirre was elected Member of Parliament several times. He later worked as Governor of the Aconcagua province. During the Chilean Civil War of 1891 he sided with President José Manuel Balmaceda.

As Dean of the University of Chile (1889–1893)Universidad de Chile he developed the cornerstone policies that supports the Chilean scholarships programs and developed the curriculum for Europeans participation in the Chilean Educational system while enabling practical aspect to all studies.

In the Faculty of Medicine he stimulated the creation of the Hygiene and Cleaning Commissions and he donated the land where today stands the Faculty of Medicine and the Hospital of the University of Chile that bears his name.
