= Juana Rosa Aguirre =

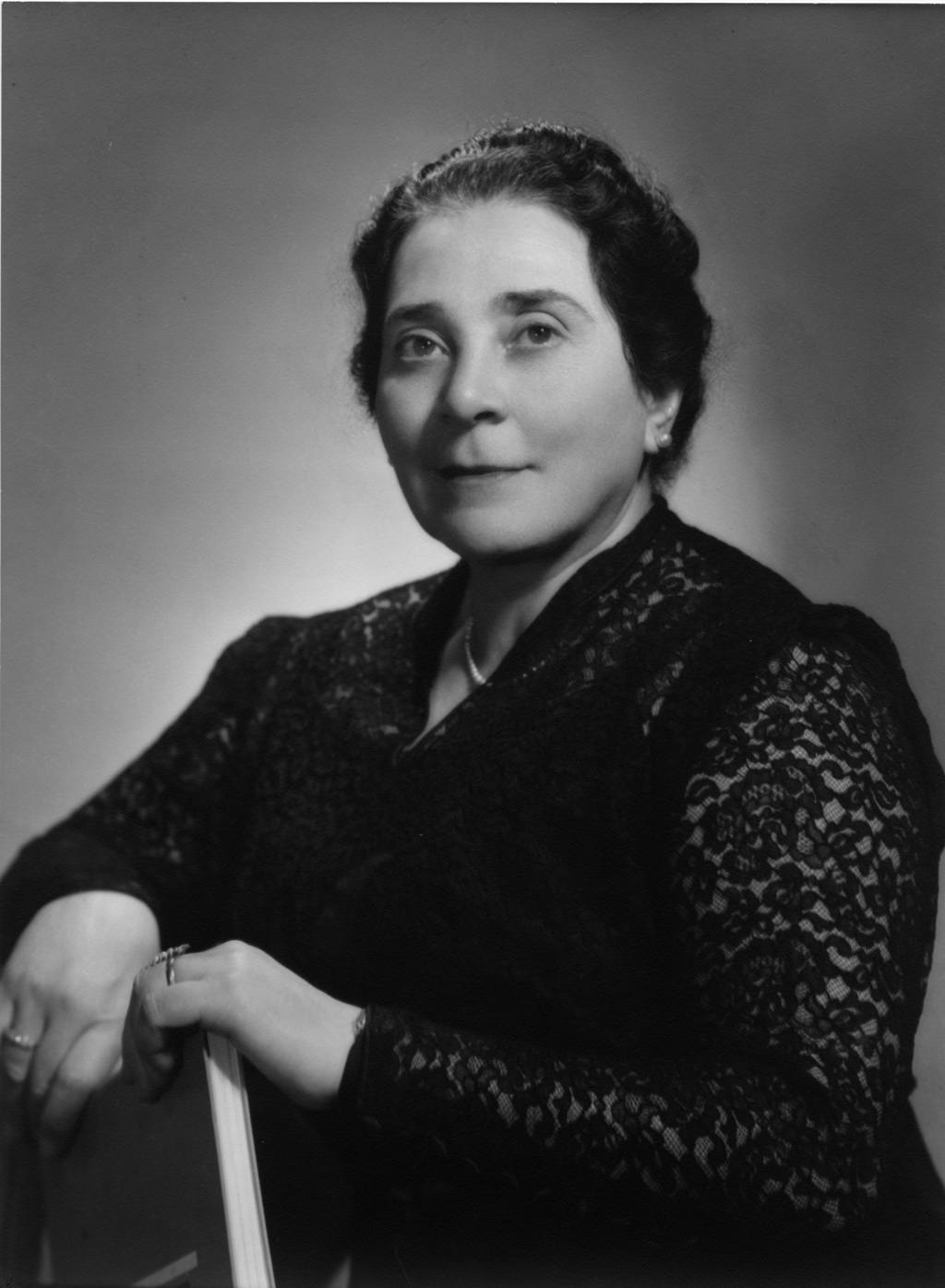

First Lady of Chile
- In role December 25, 1938 – November 25, 1941
- President: Pedro Aguirre Cerda
- Preceded by: Rosa Ester Rodríguez Velasco
- Succeeded by: Marta Ide Pereira

Personal details
- Born: Juana Rosa Aguirre Luco; November 20, 1875 Santiago, Chile
- Died: December 8, 1962 (aged 87)
- Spouse: Pedro Aguirre Cerda (m. 1916; died 1941)
- Parent(s): José Joaquín Aguirre; Mercedes Luco Gutiérrez

Juana Rosa Aguirre Luco (November 20, 1877 – December 8, 1962) was First Lady of Chile (between December 25, 1938 to November 25, 1941) and the wife of President Pedro Aguirre Cerda, who was also her cousin.

== Biography ==
She was the daughter of the popular doctor José Joaquín Aguirre Campos and his second wife Mercedes Luco Gutiérrez. She and Pedro Aguirre Cerda were married in 1916, but they never had children. She became the First Lady of Chile in 1938 when her husband assumed the presidency.

She was greatly committed to education, was popular with the public, and was a supporter of women's participation in politics in Chile.

After the death of her husband from tuberculosis in 1941, she established in his memory the Pedro Aguirre Cerda Children's Home Foundation to care for abandoned children.

Honorary titles
Preceded by Rosa Ester Rodríguez Velasco	First Lady of Chile; 1938—1941	Succeeded by Marta Ide Pereira
