= Gertrudis Echenique =

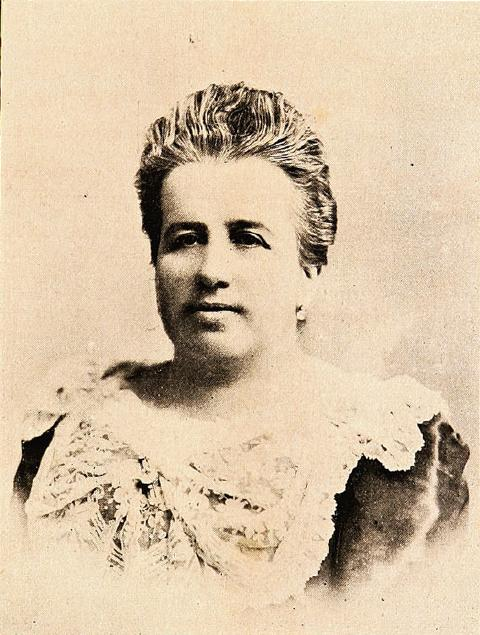

First Lady of Chile
- In role September 18, 1896 – July 12, 1901
- President: Federico Errázuriz Echaurren
- Preceded by: Leonor Frederick Ledesma
- Succeeded by: María Errázuriz Echaurren

Personal details
- Born: Gertrudis Josefa del Carmen Echenique y Mujica; 1849 Santiago, Chile
- Died: 1928 (aged 78–79)
- Spouse: Federico Errázuriz Echaurren
- Children: Federico; Elena
- Parent(s): Juan José Echenique Bascuñán; Jesús Mujica Echaurren

Gertrudis Josefa del Carmen Echenique y Mujica (1849–1928) was First Lady of Chile between 1896 and 1901.

She was born in Santiago, the daughter of Juan José Echenique Bascuñán and of his second wife, Jesús Mujica Echaurren. She married Federico Errázuriz Echaurren in 1868, and together they had two children: Federico (1869-1897) and Elena Errázuriz Echeñique (1870-1966). After the death of her husband, she withdrew to her hacienda of El Huique, in the province of Colchagua, which she continued to manage until her death.

== See also ==
- First Ladies of Chile

Honorary titles
Preceded by Leonor Frederick Ledesma	First Lady of Chile; 1896–1901	Succeeded by María Errázuriz Echaurren
