= Agustín Eyzaguirre =

Chilean political figure

Agustín Eyzaguirre Arechavala
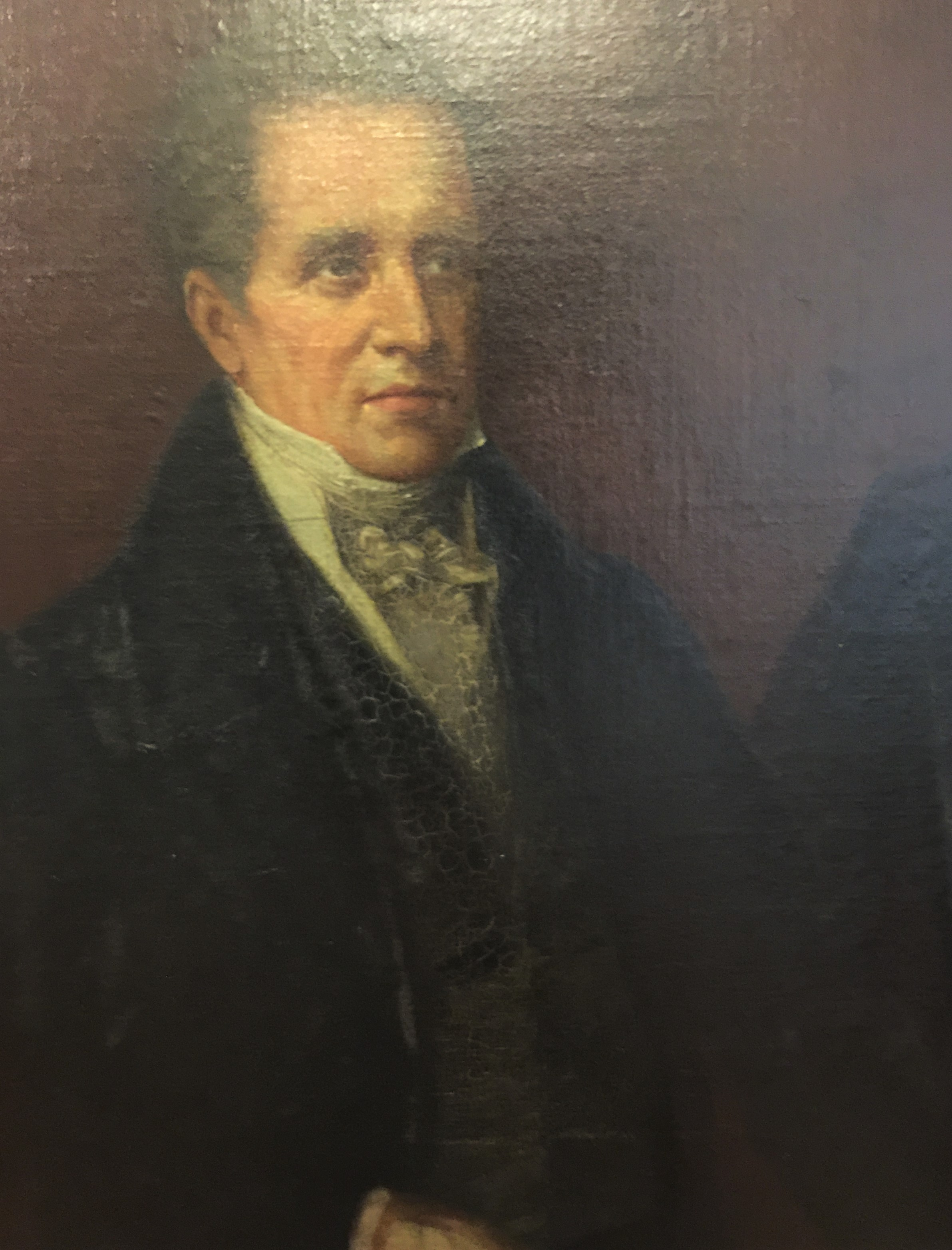

Provisional President of Chile
- In office 9 September 1826 – 25 January 1827
- Preceded by: Manuel Blanco Encalada
- Succeeded by: Ramón Freire

President of Government Junta
- In office 28 January 1823 – 4 April 1823
- Preceded by: Bernardo O'Higgins (as Supreme Director)
- Succeeded by: Ramón Freire (as Supreme Director)

President of Government Junta
- In office 11 January 1814 – 7 March 1814
- Preceded by: José Miguel Infante y Rojas
- Succeeded by: Antonio José de Irisarri (as Supreme Director)

Personal details
- Born: 3 May 1768 Santiago, Captaincy General of Chile, Spanish Empire
- Died: 19 July 1837 (aged 69) Santiago, Chile
- Party: Independent
- Spouse: Teresa Larraín

Agustín Manuel de Eyzaguirre y Arechavala (Latin American Spanish: [aɣusˈtin ejsaˈɣire]; May 3, 1768 – July 19, 1837) was a Chilean political figure. He served as Provisional President of Chile between 1826 and 1827.

== Early life ==
He was born in Santiago, Chile, the son of the Basque Domingo Eyzaguirre Escutasolo and of María Rosa de Aretxabala y Alday. He studied law and theology at the Real Universidad de San Felipe, graduating in 1789. Originally he wanted to become a priest, but later changed his mind, and decided to take over the family hacienda in Calera de Tango. He married María Teresa de Larraín y Guzmán Peralta on September 13, 1808. For the rest of his life, he dedicated himself to commerce and the management of his lands.

== Political career ==
During the first days of the revolt of Chile against Spanish domination in 1810 he was a member of the municipal corporation of Santiago, and joined the revolutionary cause with enthusiasm. He began his political career in 1812, when he was elected deputy to the first congress. When, in 1813, General José Miguel Carrera marched to meet the invasion of Brigadier Antonio Pareja, the senate appointed a temporary government, and Eyzaguirre was elected a member of the Junta de Gobierno established in March, 1813, along with José Miguel Infante and José Ignacio Cienfuegos, and which lasted until March 7, 1814.

He took an active part in founding the national academy and many schools, and in promulgating the liberty of the press; and during this administration the first republican paper was printed at Santiago. After the Battle of Rancagua, in October 1814, he, with other patriots, was imprisoned on the Island of Juan Fernandez, and all his property was confiscated. He returned after the Battle of Chacabuco, (February 12, 1817) that restored the exiles to their families.

During the presidency of Bernardo O'Higgins, Eyzaguirre retired to private life and devoted himself to his commercial interests. During this time he organized the famous Calcutta Company, for direct trade between Valparaíso and the East Indies, and thus was the first that caused the Chilean flag to float in Asiatic seas.

On January 28, 1823, he again became a member, together with José Miguel Infante y Rojas and Fernando Errázuriz Aldunate, of the ruling Government Junta that took over from the resigned Supreme Director Bernardo O'Higgins, and lasted until April 4, 1823, when Ramón Freire assumed as the new Supreme Director.

On July 8, 1826 Manuel Blanco Encalada was elected President, while he was elected Vice President. They took office on August 14, 1826. Upon the resignation of president Blanco Encalada, he assumed the office of president on September 11, 1826.

== Administration ==
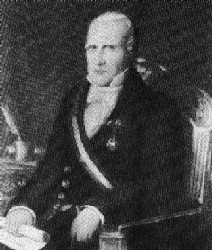
As president (1826)

His short government was marked by the financial difficulties that had caused the resignation of his predecessor. He found the treasury broke, with absolutely no sources of revenue since the complete administrative breakdown of the country prevented the government from collecting any taxes. There was no money to pay administrative personnel, and what was worse for the political situation of the time, the army was unpaid also.

Immediately upon his assuming office he had to deal first with some incidents in Chillán, and then with an insurrection in the island of Chiloé that was trying to break away from the control of the central government and return to the protection of Spain. The rebellion was very brutally suppressed, and 20 people were executed. The problems between the president and Congress that had marked the rule of his predecessor, continued. The federal laws started to cause friction between the new provinces, and the famous highwaymen the Pincheira family, started a new campaign.

Another problem was the bankruptcy of "Portales, Cea y Cía", the company in charge of the tobacco monopoly (and more importantly of the foreign debt service.) This bankruptcy became a big scandal, since the conservative opposition pointed out that the cause was the lack of legal security in a broken down country, while the government countermanded with the fact that the State would have to resume the payment of the foreign debt, when it was already bankrupt itself.

In the midst of this political bickering, colonel Enrique Campino, with the support of the radical federalist group, organized a military coup with the Santiago garrison, dissolving Congress and imprisoning some conservative ministers, chief among them Diego Portales and Manuel José Gandarillas. Finally the government managed to control the situation and imprison colonel Campino, but president Eyzaguirre had had enough. On January 25, 1827, he presented his resignation to Congress, which accepted it, and proceeded to name Ramón Freire as Presidente and Francisco Antonio Pinto as Vice President of Chile.

== Cabinet ==
The Eyzaguirre Cabinet
Office	Name	Term
President	Agustín Eyzaguirre	11 September 1826–25 January 1827
Minister of Government & Foreign Affairs	Ventura Blanco Encalada	8 March 1826–20 October 1826
Manuel José Gandarillas	20 October 1826–25 January 1827
Minister of War & Navy	Tomás Obejero	21 June 1826–26 September 1826
General Luis de la Cruz	26 September 1826–8 March 1827
Minister of Finance	Agustín Vial Santelices	12 September 1826–20 October 1826
Melchor de Santiago Concha	20 October 1826–22 October 1826

== Later life ==
After this episode, Eyzaguirre retired from politics, and remained dedicated only to his hacienda until his death. He died in Santiago on July 19, 1837.

== See also ==
- Domingo Eyzaguirre
- History of Chile

Political offices
Preceded by José Ignacio Cienfuegos	President of the Senate of Chile; 1823	Succeeded by Juan Egaña
Preceded by Manuel Blanco Encalada	President of Chile; 1826–1827	Succeeded by Ramón Freire
