= Fernando Errázuriz Aldunate =

Chilean political figure

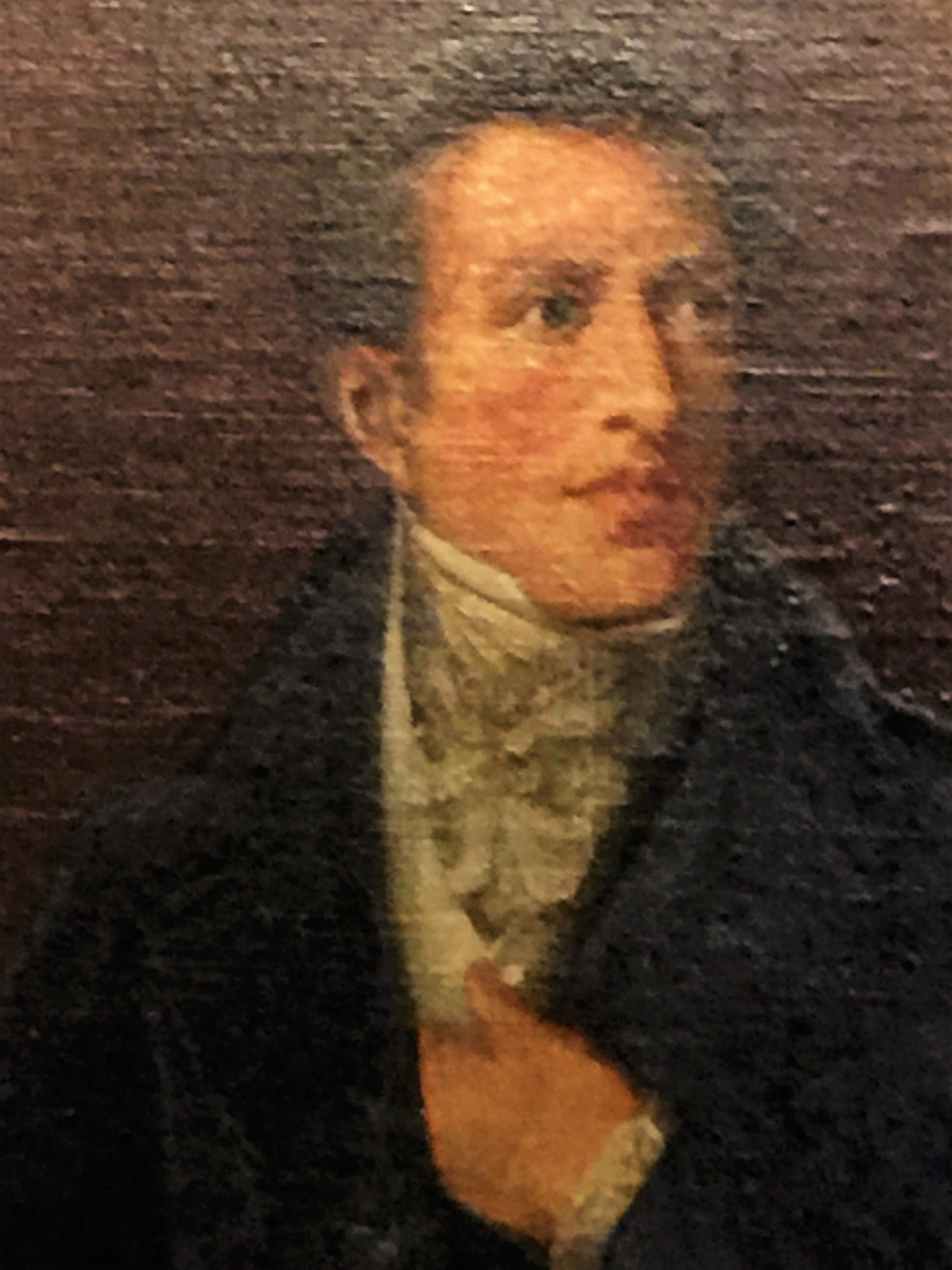

Provisional President of Chile
- In office 8 March 1831 – 18 September 1831
- Preceded by: José Tomás Ovalle
- Succeeded by: José Joaquín Prieto

Personal details
- Born: 1 June 1777 Santiago, Chile
- Died: 16 August 1841 (aged 64) Santiago, Chile
- Spouse: Maria del Carmen Elzo Sotomayor (8 children)
- Children: Francisco Javier, Fernando, Dolores, José Manuel, Tadea, Pedro, Mariana y Fidela

Fernando de Errázuriz y Martínez de Aldunate (Latin American Spanish: [feɾˈnando eˈrasuɾis alduˈnate]; 1 June 1777 – 16 August 1841), also known as Fernando Errázuriz Aldunate, was a Chilean political figure. He served as provisional president of Chile in 1831.

== Biography ==
Errázuriz was born in Santiago, the son of Francisco Javier de Errázuriz y Madariaga and of María Rosa Aldunate y Guerrero Carrera. He became a lawyer and participated in the independence movement in Chile. On 2 October 1801 he married María del Carmen Sotomayor Elzo, with whom he had 8 children.

== Chilean independence process (1810–1823) ==
In the First Government Junta (open council 1810 ), he was governor of the open council of 1810.

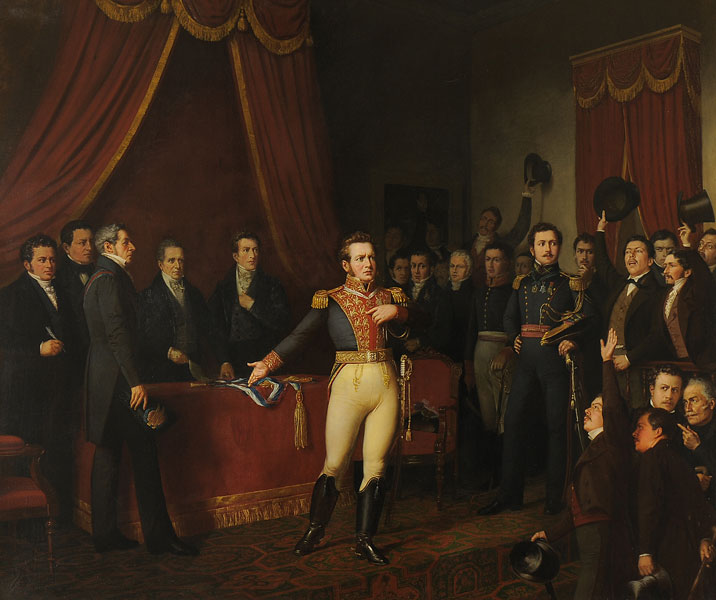
Abdication of O'Higgins Oil on canvas Manuel Antonio Caro

During the period of the Patria Vieja, he was elected deputy for Rancagua in the First National Congress of 1811.

== War of Independence of Chile ==
He participated in the War of Independence and suffered persecution during the Spanish conquest between 1814 and 1817. He regained his freedom after the patriot victory at Chacabuco on 12 February 1817.

During the period of Patria Nueva, from 12 February 1817 until 28 January 1823, he was deputy for Rancagua.

On the morning of 28 January 1823 an open council meeting was convened to ask for the abdication of the Supreme Director Bernardo O'Higgins. The Government Junta was formed by Agustín de Eyzaguirre, Errázuriz and José Miguel Infante.

On 12 December 1823 he was elected president of the Congress, which began to be bicameral.

In 1823 he was senator for Santiago and President of the Senate; as such, was appointed supreme director, delegated on 3 January 1824.

He was senator of Santiago again between 1831 and 1834.

== President of Chile ==
Provisional President of Chile: He served as president of the Provincial Assembly of the Santiago in 19 October 1826 and 26 November 1827. He was appointed interim president of the congress of plenipotentiaries in March 1830.

Provisional President of Chile: On 8 March 1831, due to the resignation and subsequent death of José Tomás Ovalle was appointed accidental vice president or provisional president until 22 March. That day, he took the office, which was maintained until 18 September that year. Then he was succeeded by José Joaquín Prieto, who had been elected in the convened presidential vote.

== Cabinet ==
The Errázuriz Cabinet
Office	Name	Term
President	Fernando Errázuriz Aldunate	8 March 1831–31 March 1831
Minister of the Interior & Foreign Affairs	Diego Portales	5 April 1830–31 August 1831
Minister of War & Navy	Colonel José María de la Cruz	25 September 1830–24 March 1831
Diego Portales	24 March 1831–31 August 1831
Minister of Finance	Manuel Rengifo	15 June 1830–9 November 1835

== See also ==
- Jose Martinez de Aldunate

Political offices
Preceded by None	Member of Government Junta; 1823	Succeeded by None
Preceded by José Tomás Ovalle	Provisional President of Chile; 1831	Succeeded by José Joaquín Prieto
