= Salvador Sanfuentes =

Chilean lawyer, politician and poet

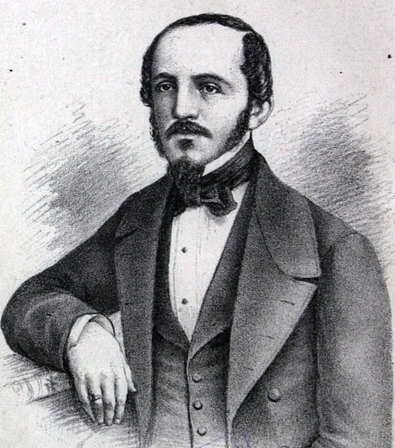
Salvador Sanfuentes Torres (cropped)

Salvador Sanfuentes (February 2, 1817 – July 17, 1860) was a Chilean lawyer, politician and poet. He served as Minister of Justice and Public Worship twice, and was elected as MP for the Association of Vallenar.

Sanfuentes was appointed intendant of the Province of Valdivia in 1845 and being tasked with surveying its colonization potential of the territory. To carry out the survey, Sanfuentes commissioned Bernardo Philippi as "provincial engineer".
