= Enriqueta Pinto =

Chilean translator and First Lady (1817 – 1904)

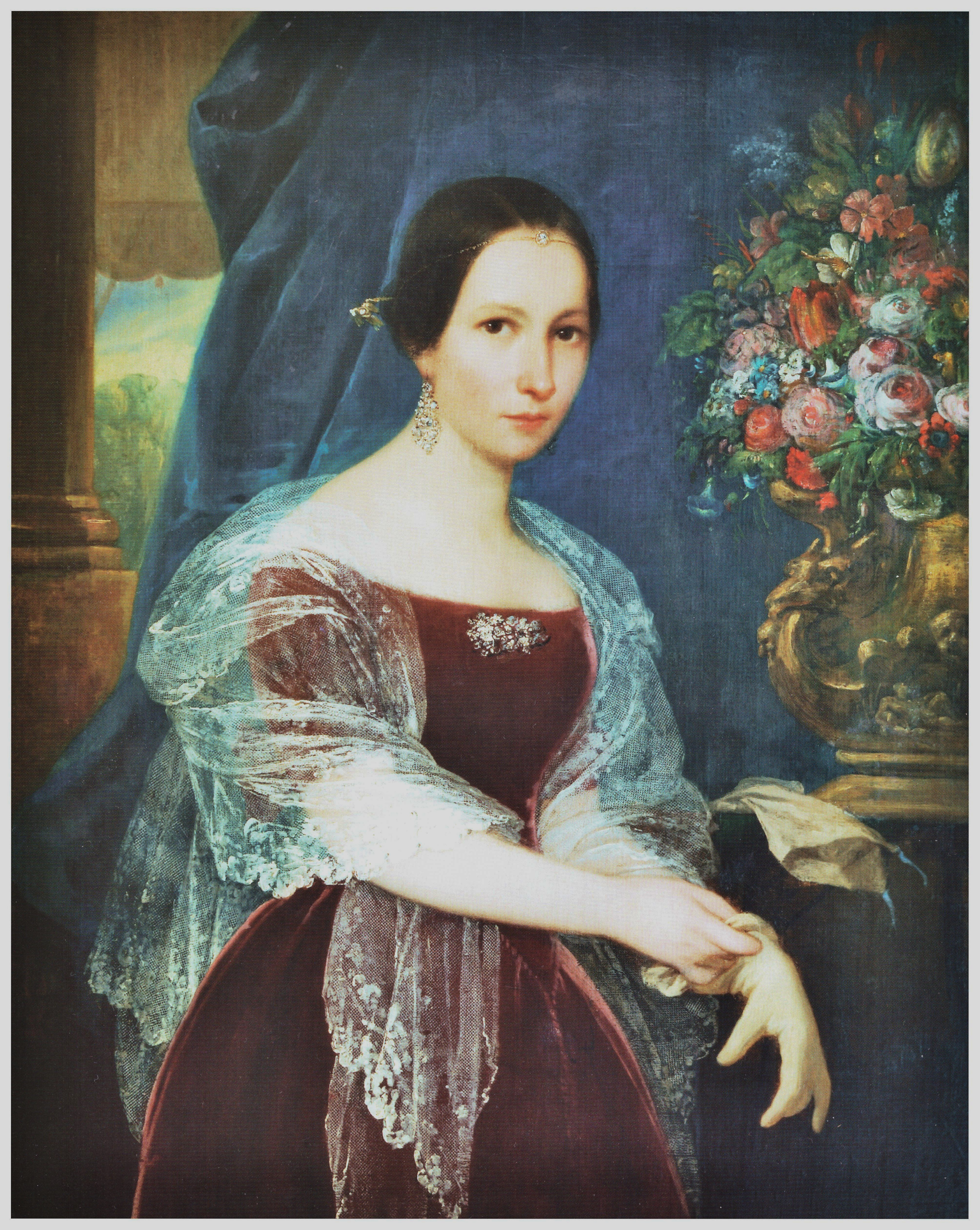
- Raymond Monvoisin (c. 1843 – 1857) Retrato de doña Enriqueta Pinto de Bulnes

First Lady of Chile
- In role 18 September 1841 – 18 September 1851
- President: Manuel Bulnes
- Preceded by: Manuela Warnes
- Succeeded by: Rosario Montt

Personal details
- Born: Enriqueta Pinto Garmendia; 1817 Tucumán, United Provinces of the Río de la Plata
- Died: 26 December 1904 (aged 86–87) Santiago, Chile
- Spouse: Manuel Bulnes (m. 1841; died 1866)
- Children: 8, including Manuel Bulnes Pinto; Lucia Bulnes de Vergara
- Parents: Francisco Antonio Pinto (father); Luisa Garmendia (mother)
- Relatives: Aníbal Pinto (brother); Francisco Bulnes Correa (nephew)
- Occupation: Translator

Enriqueta Pinto de Bulnes (née Pinto Garmendia; 1817 — 26 December 1904) was a Chilean translator and First Lady during 1841 to 1851.

== Early life and family ==
Pinto was born in 1817 in Tucumán, United Provinces of the Río de la Plata (present-day, Argentina) to Francisco Antonio Pinto, a lawyer, military general, politician and future 3rd President of Chile, and Luisa Garmendia, the future First Lady and founder of the Pinto political dynasty. Pinto was the older sister of Aníbal Pinto, a lawyer, politician and 9th President of Chile.

On 20 July 1841, Pinto married Manuel Bulnes, a military officer, politician and future 5th President of Chile. Pinto and Bulnes had eight children, including:

- Manuel Bulnes Pinto (1842–1899), military officer and politician; married Elena Calvo Cruchaga.
- Lucia Bulnes de Vergara (1845–1932), writer; married Ruperto Vergara Rencoret (1835-1908).
- Gonzalo Bulnes Pinto (1851–1936), journalist, historian and politician; married Carmela Correa Sanfuentes.

== Career ==
Pinto was fluent in English and French. In 1859, Pinto translated the second edition of Manual for a Christian Woman by Abbot Frédéric Édouard Chassan.

Pinto was a member of the Literary Society of the Catholic University of Louvain, the Parisian Academy of Teaching, the Académie des Sciences, Arts et Belles-Lettres de Caen, and the Société nationale académique de Cherbourg.

Honorary titles
Preceded by Manuela Warnes	First Lady of Chile; 1841–1851	Succeeded by Rosario Montt
