= Manuel Antonio Warnes =

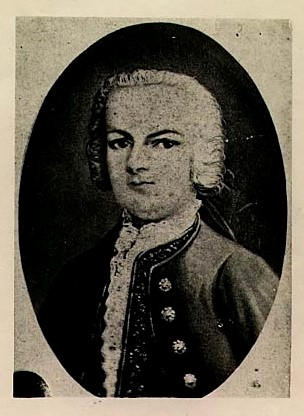
- Portrait of Manuel Antonio Warnes

Alcalde of Buenos Aires
- In office 1775–1776
- Monarch: Charles III
- Preceded by: Francisco Antonio Basavilbaso
- Succeeded by: Ignacio de Irigoyen

Personal details
- Born: Manuel Antonio Warnes y Durango; June 19, 1727 Cartagena
- Died: 1802 (aged 74–75) Buenos Aires, Argentina
- Spouse(s): María Josepha Arraez; Ana Jacoba García de Zúñiga
- Occupation: Politician
- Profession: Army's officer
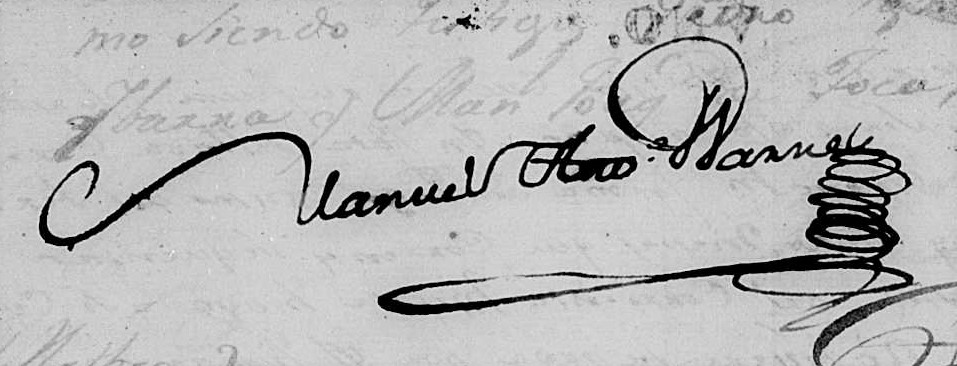
- Signature

Military service
- Allegiance: Spain
- Branch/service: Spanish Army
- Rank: Captain

Manuel Antonio Warnes y Durango (June 19, 1727 – 1802) was a Spanish military man, who served as regidor and alcalde of Buenos Aires during the Viceroyalty of the Río de la Plata.

== Biography ==
Warnes was born in Cartagena (Colombia), the son of Patricio Benito Warnes Geer and Juana María Durango y Atienza, belonging to a family of Irish, Flemish and Spanish origin. He had arrived in port of Buenos Aires from Cádiz as Master of the French frigate "Amable Maria". In 1756, he was appointed as alcalde of second vote (vice-mayor) of Buenos Aires, being designated alcalde in first vote in 1775 and 1788.

His great great grandfather was Salomón Warnes (born in Connacht), banished from Ireland for religious reasons, he had settled in Antwerp, at the beginning of the 17th century.
