= Luisa Garmendia =

Argentine-Chilean First Lady of Chile (1797– 1857)

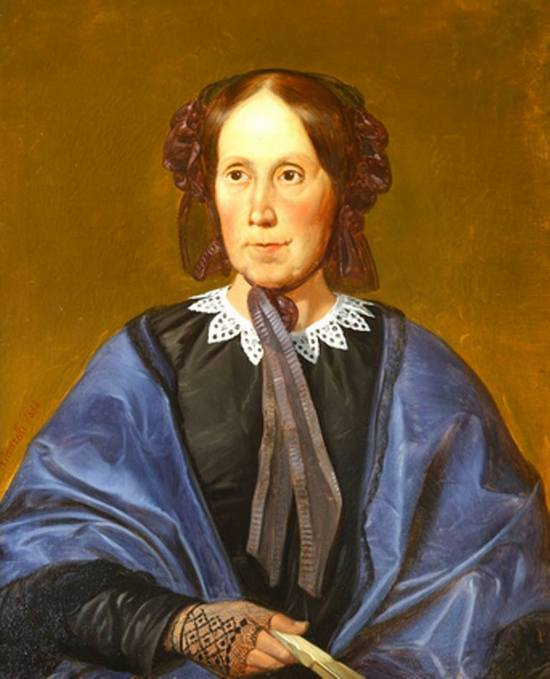

First Lady of Chile
- In role 1827–1829
- President: Francisco Antonio Pinto
- Preceded by: Teresa Larraín
- Succeeded by: Mariana de Aguirre

Personal details
- Born: Luisa Garmendia Alurralde; 1797 Tucumán Province, Viceroyalty of the Río de la Plata, Spanish Empire
- Died: 26 May 1857 (aged 59–60) Santiago, Chile
- Resting place: Santiago General Cemetery
- Spouse: Francisco Antonio Pinto (m. 1817)
- Relations: Ildefonso de las Muñecas (half-brother); José Ignacio Garmendia y Alurralde (brother); Manuel Bulnes (son-in-law); Delfina de la Cruz (daughter-in-law); Lucia Bulnes de Vergara (granddaughter)
- Children: Enriqueta Pinto; Aníbal Pinto
- Parent: Elena María Alurralde (mother)

Luisa Garmendia Alurralde de Pinto (née Garmendia Alurralde; 1797 – 26 May 1857) was the Argentine-Chilean First Lady of Chile between 1827 and 1829. Garmendia is considered the founder of the Pinto political dynasty.

== Biography ==
Garmendia was born in 1797 in Tucumán Province, Viceroyalty of the Río de la Plata (present-day Argentina) to José Ignacio Garmendia Aguirre and Elena María Alurralde, a supporter of Argentine Independence. Through her mother Garmendia was the younger half-sister of Ildefonso de las Muñecas, a Catholic priest and guerrilla in the Bolivian War of Independence, and Juan Manuel de las Muñecas, a military officer and supporter of Argentine Independence. Garmendia was also the younger sister of the politician José Ignacio Garmendia y Alurralde.

Garmendia met her future husband Francisco Antonio Pinto, at the time a lawyer and military general and later a politician and 3rd President of Chile, whilst he was stationed in Tucumán Province. Garmendia later married Pinto in 1817. In 1823, Garmendia and Pinto relocated to Chile where Pinto began his political career. Following her husband's election as the President of Chile, Garmendia became the First Lady of Chile in 1827. Garmendia served as First Lady until July 1829 when her husband resigned from the presidency following the Revolution of 1829.

== Personal life ==
Considered to be the founder of the Pinto political dynasty, Garmendia and Pinto's children included:

- Enriqueta Pinto (1817–1904), translator and First Lady of Chile during 1841 to 1851; married Manuel Bulnes (1799–1866), a military officer, politician and 5th President of Chile.
- Aníbal Pinto (1825–1884), lawyer, politician and 9th President of Chile; married Delfina de la Cruz (1837–1905), a pianist and First Lady of Chile.

Garmendia died in Santiago on 26 May 1857, and was buried at Santiago General Cemetery.

Honorary titles
| Preceded by Teresa Larraín | First Lady of Chile; 1827–1829 | Succeeded by Mariana de Aguirre |
