= Francisco Antonio Pinto =

4th President of Chile

General Francisco Antonio Pinto
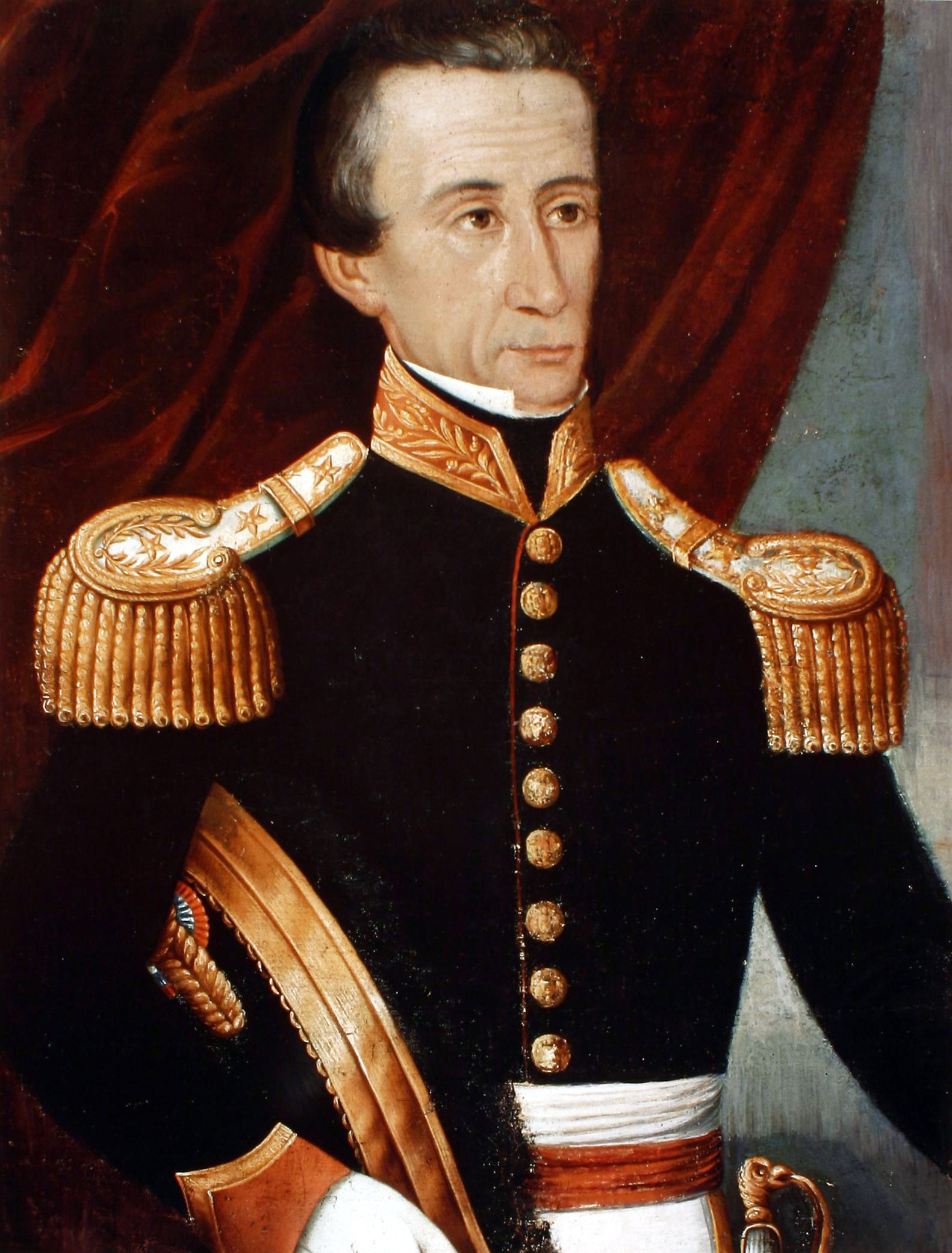
- Portrait, 1820

3rd President of Chile
- In office 8 May 1827 – 16 July 1829
- Preceded by: Ramón Freire
- Succeeded by: Francisco Ramón Vicuña
- In office 19 October 1829 – 2 November 1829
- Vice President: Joaquín Vicuña
- Preceded by: Francisco Ramón Vicuña
- Succeeded by: Francisco Ramón Vicuña

President of the Senate of Chile
- In office 1855–1858
- Preceded by: Diego José Benavente
- Succeeded by: Manuel José Cerda

Minister of War and Navy
- In office 1825–1825
- Leader: Ramón Freire
- Preceded by: Santiago Fernández Barriga
- Succeeded by: Francisco Ramón Vicuña

Minister of Government and Foreign Affairs
- In office 1824–1825
- Leader: Ramón Freire
- Preceded by: Mariano Egaña
- Succeeded by: Francisco Ramón Vicuña

Personal details
- Born: 23 July 1785 Santiago, Captaincy General of Chile, Spanish Empire
- Died: 18 July 1858 (aged 72) Santiago, Chile
- Party: Pipiolos (1823-1849); Liberal Party (1849-1858)
- Spouse: Luisa Garmendia (m. 1817; died 1857)

Francisco Antonio Pinto y Díaz de la Puente (Latin American Spanish: [fɾanˈsisko anˈtonjo ˈpinto]; July 23, 1785 – July 18, 1858) was a Chilean lawyer, military general and politician who served as President of Chile between 1827 and 1829.

== Early life ==
Pinto was born on July 23, 1785, in Santiago, Captaincy General of Chile to Joaquin Fernández de Pinto and Mercedes Díaz de la Puente y Darrigrande. Pinto completed his early studies in the Convictorio Carolino, the best school in the country at the time, and then studied law at the Real Universidad de San Felipe, being admitted to practice on October 11, 1808.

In his youth he dedicated himself to commerce. According to the social norms of the time, he also became a militia officer in the "Regimiento del Rey" (King's regiment). In 1810, while in Lima, he heard of the formation of the Government Junta of the Kingdom, and immediately returned to the country, where he was charged with a diplomatic mission to Buenos Aires. After that successful first mission, he was sent to England, and then to other European countries, with the mission of gathering support for the independence movement. While in Europe he learnt of the news of the defeat of the Chilean army in the Battle of Rancagua and the recapture of Chile by the Spanish troops. He then returned to Argentina to cooperate in the formation of a new army.

== Political career ==
In 1820 he finally returned to Chile. He was then sent by Bernardo O'Higgins to Peru, to help in the independence of that country. In 1824 he was named as Minister of Government and Foreign Affairs, and in 1825, Intendant of Coquimbo.

In 1827, due to the resignation of President Agustín Eyzaguirre, General Ramón Freire was elected president, while General Pinto was elected Vice President. When General Freire himself resigned on May 5, 1827, General Pinto took over the position as "Accidental President". As such he participated in the drafting of the Constitution of 1828.

A new presidential election was called in May 1829. General Pinto was the clear winner out of 9 candidates, with 118 electoral votes (29.06%), and was proclaimed elected on October 19. Nevertheless, the onset of the Chilean Civil War of 1829 was at hand.

The problem that caused the revolution happened in the vice presidential election. The winner should have been the first runner-up, Francisco Ruiz-Tagle (98 electoral votes or 24.13%), or the second runner-up, General José Joaquín Prieto, (61 votes or 15.02%), both conservatives. Nonetheless, Congress was controlled by the liberals and presided by Francisco Ramón Vicuña, also liberal. Arguing that no vice-presidential candidate had a majority, they selected Joaquín Vicuña, brother of the president of the senate, even though he only got 48 electoral votes (11.82%). That was all the excuse needed by the conservatives to rebel.

Pinto resigned the Presidency on November 2 (less than two weeks after his proclamation), an event that marked his retirement from public life. All his powers were assumed by the President of Congress, Francisco Ramón Vicuña, who was already acting as "Accidental President" since July 16, 1829, when Pinto had delegated his powers on him for the duration of the electoral campaign.

=== Cabinet ===
The Pinto Cabinet
Office	Name	Term
President	Francisco Antonio Pinto	5 May 1827–16 July 1829
Minister of Government & Foreign Affairs	Pbtro. José Miguel del Solar	8 March 1827–13 December 1827
Carlos Rodríguez	13 December 1827–16 July 1829
Minister of War & Navy	General José Manuel Borgoño	8 March 1827–16 July 1829
Minister of Finance	Ventura Blanco Encalada	8 March 1827–23 July 1828
Francisco Ruiz-Tagle	23 July 1828–16 July 1829

Pinto only returned to public life in 1841, as a congressman. The Liberal party proclaimed him as a candidate to the Presidency in the Chilean presidential elections of 1841, in opposition to his son in law, General Manuel Bulnes, who finally resulted elected. He did not participate in the campaign in any active form. Nonetheless, he was elected a deputy for La Serena, and president of the chamber, on May 30, 1843. He was elected a senator in 1846, and became a member of the permanent war and navy commission. He was also named Privy Council by President Bulnes.

In 1846, botanist Claude Gay published Pintoa, a genus of flowering plants from Chile, belonging to the family Zygophyllaceae and named in honour of Francisco Antonio Pinto.

On July 5, 1847, he was elected president of the Senate. He was reelected as a senator on 1855. Pinto died in Santiago at the age of 72, on July 18, 1858, before the end of his mandate as senator.

== Personal life ==
In 1817, Pinto married Luisa Garmendia, the future First Lady of Chile. Pinto's and Garmendia's children included the politician and future Chilean president Aníbal Pinto, and Enriqueta Pinto, the future First Lady and wife of Manuel Bulnes.

Pinto's grandnephew, Ignacio Carrera Pinto, and grandson, José Miguel Carrera, were both appointed heroes at the War of the Pacific.

Pinto was the great-grandfather of the sculptor Marie-Thérèse Pinto.
