= Aníbal Pinto =

Chilean political figure (1825–1884)

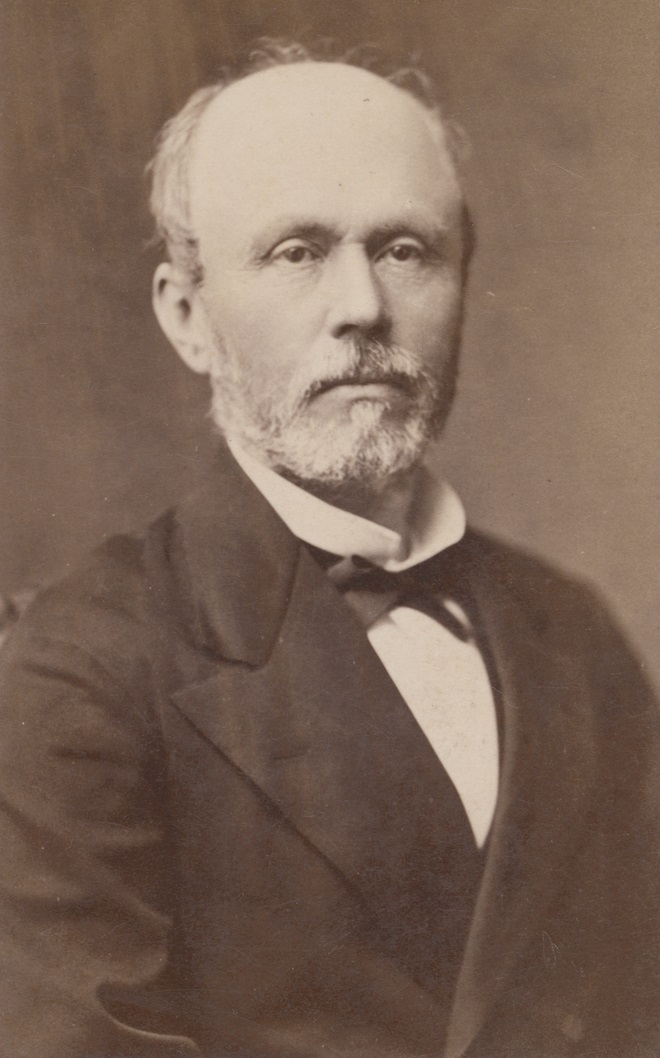

9th President of Chile
- In office September 18, 1876 – September 18, 1881
- Preceded by: Federico Errázuriz Zañartu
- Succeeded by: Domingo Santa María

Personal details
- Born: March 15, 1825 Santiago, Chile
- Died: June 9, 1884 (aged 59) Valparaíso, Chile
- Party: Liberal
- Spouse: Delfina de la Cruz (m. 1855)
- Children: 7

Aníbal Pinto Garmendia (Latin American Spanish: [aˈniβal ˈpinto]; 15 March 1825 – 9 June 1884) was a Chilean political figure. He served as the president of Chile between 1876 and 1881.

== Early life ==
Pinto was born on 15 March 1825 in Santiago, Chile to Francisco Antonio Pinto and Luisa Garmendia. He completed his studies at the Colegio Argentino de Santiago and the Instituto Nacional. At the age of 20, he joined the foreign service, and was posted as under-secretary to the Chilean Legation to the Holy See. He returned to Chile two years later, in 1850. Two years later, he was elected to the lower house of congress, and was reelected several times. Later, he became a Senator and, in 1861, was named Intendant of Concepción, position that he held for 10 years.

In 1871, President Errázuriz named him minister of war and navy, and, from that position, became one of the contenders for the presidential nomination. He first defeated Miguel Luis Amunátegui in the liberal primaries, and later Benjamín Vicuña in the presidential elections.

== Administration ==
His government started under the weight of the worst Chilean economic crisis of the 19th century. This was made worse by the floods of 1876, that laid waste to the nascent infrastructure. An earthquake on May 9, 1877, completed the destruction. At this juncture, he declared the non-convertibility of the currency, a measure that prevented a run on the banks and saved the public credit, but caused him the enmity of the opposition.

In 1878, he named Viña del Mar as a commune.

Nonetheless, the principal crisis of his administration was the outbreak of the War of the Pacific with Peru and Bolivia. He managed to successfully face the first onslaught, at the same time, achieving the all-important Argentinian neutrality. On July 23, 1881, he signed a treaty with Argentina recognising Argentine sovereignty on eastern Patagonia and Eastern Tierra del Fuego but keeping the Strait of Magellan and western Tierra del Fuego under Chilean control.

He also managed to obtain the capture of Antofagasta and Tarapacá and used these territories as new sources of revenue to finance the rest of the war.

== Later life ==
After his retirement from politics, a debt that he had personally guaranteed forced him to sell all his property, having to move to a very modest house near Victoria square, in Valparaíso. Though he was offered the position of senator or different embassies in Europe, he decided to make do working as a translator for the railroad companies. He died in Valparaíso in 1884.

== Personal life ==
In 1855, Pinto married Delfina de la Cruz Zañartu, a pianist and future First Lady of Chile, with whom he had 7 children.

Through his son Francisco Antonio Pinto Cruz, a lawyer, politician and diplomat, Pinto was the grandfather of the sculptor Marie-Thérèse Pinto.

Pinto was the son-in-law of General José María de la Cruz Prieto.

Political offices
Preceded by Federico Errázuriz Zañartu	President of Chile; 1876-1881	Succeeded by Domingo Santa María
Government offices
Preceded by José Ramón Lira	Minister of War and Navy; 1871-1875	Succeeded by Ignacio Zenteno
