= Manuel Bulnes =

4th President of Chile (1841–51)

Divisional General Manuel Bulnes
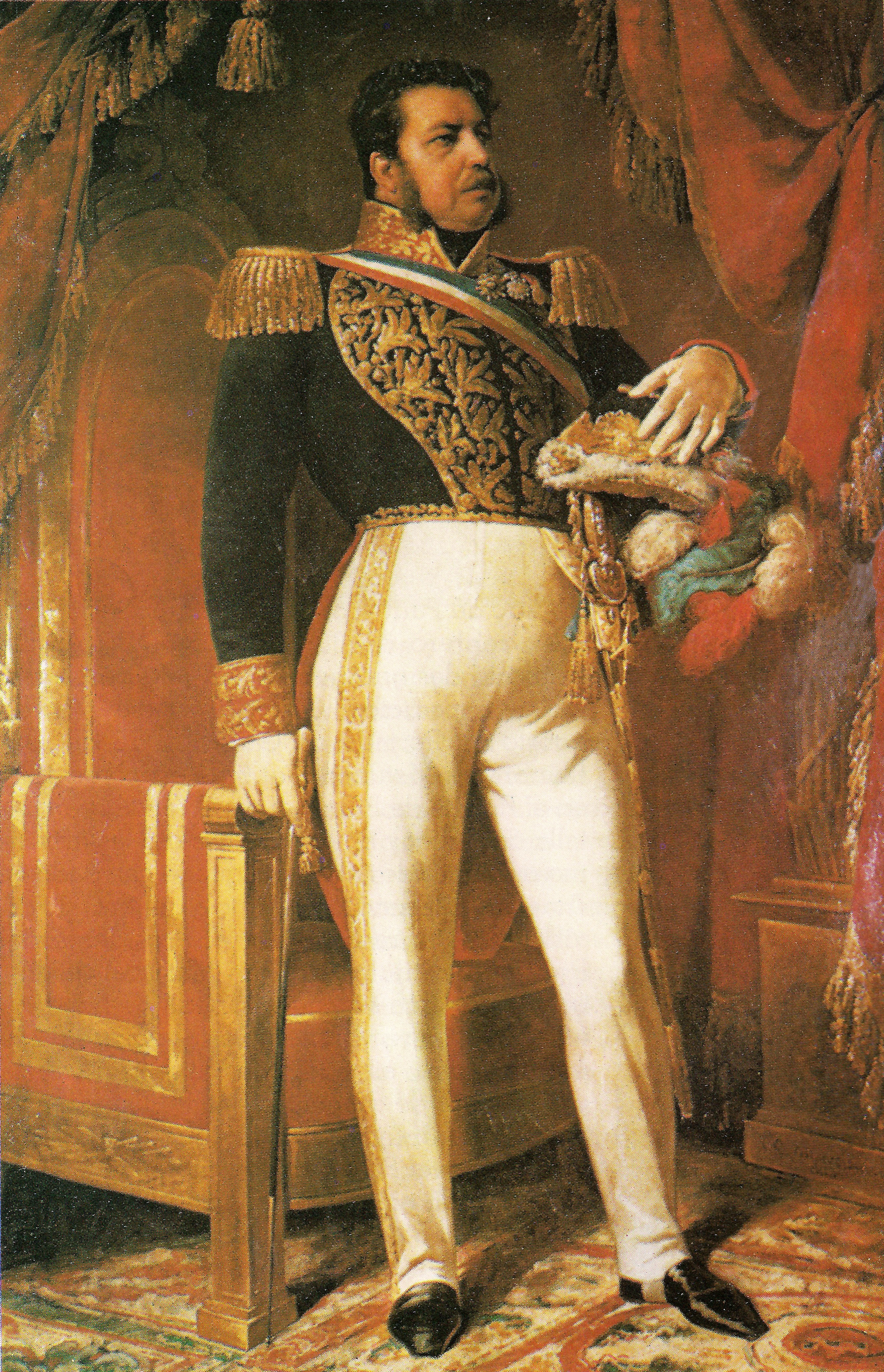

5th President of Chile
- In office 18 September 1841 – 18 September 1851
- Preceded by: José Joaquín Prieto
- Succeeded by: Manuel Montt

Personal details
- Born: 25 December 1799 Concepción, Kingdom of Chile
- Died: 18 October 1866 (aged 66) Santiago, Chile
- Party: Conservative Party
- Spouse: Enriqueta Pinto
- Children: Lucia Bulnes de Vergara

Military service
- Battles/wars: Chilean War of Independence; Battle of Quechereguas; Second Battle of Cancha Rayada; Battle of Maipú; Chilean Civil War of 1829–30; Battle of Lircay; Campaign against the Pincheira brothers; Battle of Epulafquén; War of the Confederation; Battle of Portada de Guías; Battle of Buin; Battle of Yungay; Revolution of 1851; Battle of Loncomilla

Manuel Bulnes Prieto (Latin American Spanish: [maˈnwel ˈβulnes]; December 25, 1799 – October 18, 1866) was a Chilean military and political figure who was President of Chile from 1841 to 1851.

Born in Concepción, he served as the president of Chile between 1841 and 1851. At the age of 16 he was imprisoned as a revolutionary by the Spanish authorities, but was soon released, and in 1818 joined the army of San Martin under whom he served as colonel throughout the Chilean War of Independence. After three years of continuous warfare (1820–23), he accomplished the temporary conquest of the Araucanian Indians. He was appointed brigadier general in 1831. In 1832 he crossed the Cordillera and defeated decisively the Pincheira brothers in the battle of Epulafquén. Then Bulnes commanded the Chilean army in 1838 against Gen. Santa Cruz in Peru; and, after taking Lima and winning the battles of Huaraz and Puente del Buin, combined his forces with those of Gamarra and defeated Santa Cruz at the Battle of Yungay (January 19, 1839), thus putting an end to the confederation between Peru and Bolivia.

== Presidency (1841–1851) ==
His presidencies were characterised by educational and cultural expansion, supported by the encouragement of foreign intellectuals to come to Chile. The National Institute was reformed and several junior schools were established along with the José Abelardo Núñez Upper School. In Santiago the University of Chile was founded during his watch, in 1842, as well as a technical training school from which the University of Santiago is descended.

Bulnes also presided over a general amnesty in order to reconcile the groups who had opposed one another in the Civil War of 1829.

Regarding the nation's strategic goals, Bulnes founded Fuerte Bulnes in 1843 in order to establish and enforce sovereignty over the Magellan Straits. The settlement was relocated to Punta Arenas six years later because the original site offered insufficient space for the development of a settled community: it was and remains the most southerly municipality in the world, and has been a focus for economic development in the south of the country. Germans were targeted to colonise the hitherto very sparsely inhabited southern part of Chile in the wake of the 1848 revolutions which provided an impetus for emigration from the European perspective.

It was also during the presidency of Bulnes that the former colonial power, Spain, acknowledged the independence of Chile and became involved in the construction of Chile's first railway.

Manuel Bulnes Prieto died in Santiago.

=== Cabinet ===
The Bulnes Cabinet
Office	Name	Term
President	Manuel Bulnes	18 September 1841–18 September 1851
Minister of the Interior & Foreign Affairs	Ramón Luis Irarrázaval	19 May 1841–10 April 1845
Manuel Montt	10 April 1845–18 September 1846
Manuel Camilo Vial	18 September 1846–12 June 1849
José Joaquín Pérez	12 June 1849–19 April 1850
Antonio Varas	19 April 1850–
Minister of War & Navy	General José María de la Cruz	18 September 1841–20 April 1842
General José Santiago Aldunate	20 April 1842–18 September 1846
General José Manuel Borgoño	18 September 1846–8 April 1848
Pedro Vidal	8 April 1848–18 September 1851
Minister of Finance	Manuel Rengifo	18 September 1841–10 April 1845
José Joaquín Pérez	10 April 1845–22 September 1846
Manuel Vial Formas	22 September 1846–9 May 1848
Salvador Sanfuentes	9 May 1848–12 June 1849
Antonio García Reyes	12 June 1849–19 April 1850
Jerónimo Urmeneta	19 April 1850–7 May 1852
Minister of Justice, Clergy & Public Instruction	Manuel Montt	27 March 1841–10 April 1845
Antonio Varas	10 April 1845–18 September 1846
Salvador Sanfuentes	18 September 1846–12 June 1849
Manuel Antonio Tocornal	12 June 1849–2 July 1850
Máximo Mujica	2 July 1850–18 September 1851

Political offices
Preceded by José Joaquín Prieto	President of Chile; 1841-1851	Succeeded by Manuel Montt
Military offices
Preceded by José Joaquín Prieto	Army Commander-in-chief; 1841-1866	Succeeded by Marcos Maturana
