= New Fatherland =

Period of the history of Chile, 1817–1823

Republic of Chile República de Chile
- 1817–1823
- Flag Coat of arms
- Anthem: Canción Nacional Chilean "Chilean National Song"
- Effective territory and claims based on the uti possidetis of 1810.
- Capital: Santiago
- Common languages: Spanish (official); Indigenous languages (Quechuan languages, Aymara, Mapudungun, Kawésqar, Yaghan)
- Government: Dictatorship
- Supreme Director
  - 1817-1823: Bernardo O'Higgins
  - 1817: Manuel Xavier Rodríguez Erdoíza (self-proclaimed)
  - 1823: Agustín Eyzaguirre (acting)
  - 1823‐1826: Ramón Freire
- Historical era: Decolonization of the Americas
  - Established: 12 February 1817
  - Declaration of Independence: 12 February 1818
  - Battle of Maipú: 5 April 1818
  - Provisional Constitution: 23 October 1818
  - Constitution: 8 August 1822
  - Disestablished: 28 January 1823

Population
  - 1818: 850,000
Preceded by	Succeeded by
Reconquest (Chile)	Organization of the Republic

New Fatherland (Spanish: Patria Nueva) was a period in the history of Chile that began with the victory of Ejército de los Andes in the Battle of Chacabuco on 12 February 1817 and ended with the resignation of Bernardo O'Higgins as Supreme Director in 1823.

== Government of Bernardo O'Higgins ==
«Flag of the Transition» (1817), The flag of the transition of Chile was adopted from 26 May until 17 October 1817

Original design of the Chilean flag, used between 1817 and 1847

=== First measures as Supreme Director ===
Not long after becoming the Supreme Director of Chile, O'Higgins sent the Aguila, a ship captured in the port of Valparaíso, to rescue Chilean patriots stranded on the Juan Fernández Islands. O'Higgins formed an army to face the Spanish Empire forces hidden in the port of Talcahuano and the montoneras (traitor patriots, natives and bandits), who were on the shore of the Bio-Bio River.

He created the Vindication Tribunal, a legal apparatus that granted patriots the right to reclaim goods taken by the Spanish during the Reconquest. He also ordered the exile of priests advocating for continued fealty to the Spanish throne.

=== The surprise of Cancha Rayada ===
The independent people waited in Talca for the royalists, but the royalists took another path. San Martin and O'Higgins were caught by surprise.

In Santiago fear had spread with the defeat of the Ejército de los Andes and the Chilean army. Many people in Santiago were already going into self-imposed exile again in Mendoza. Rumors of the deaths of O'Higgins and San Martin spread rapidly.

In these circumstances, in the cabildo of 23 March, Manuel Rodríguez yelled "We still have our homeland, citizens!" and proclaimed himself the supreme director. He created a squadron called Húsares de la Muerte. It attracted many "carreristas", swearing to die before seeing the homeland in the hands of Spain again. Knowing this, O'Higgins went back to Santiago against medical advice and accompanied by San Martin. Both were welcomed with cannon shots on the sunrise of 24 March.

=== Consolidation and progress of the Independence Movement ===
Despite having signed the Declaration of Independence, Chile and Argentina experienced unstable independence attributable to the presence of the Royalists in Peru. San Martín continued his planned invasion of Peru with the added support of O'Higgins. Organized in 1820 by the government of Chile, the Freedom Expedition of Peru, led by Commanding General José de San Martín and Lord Thomas Cochrane, was one of the central forces leading to the Peruvian War of Independence. In 1822, San Martin retired from the campaign, resigning as Protector of Peru. Simon Bolivar took his place, backed by the Colombian government, and continued to fight for Peru's independence.

Cochrane would settle the decisive blow to the Royalists in Chile when, in 1820, he seized the Valdivian Fort System, the most fortified place in South America at the time. Cochrane succeeded in the Capture of Valdivia using a surprise land assault. He then sent a small force in charge of Jorge Beauchef to pursue the Royalist army fleeing from Valdivia to Chiloe and, in the process, conquered the cities located further south of Valdivia - including Me Río Bueno and Osorno.

After the capture of Valdivia, Lord Cochrane left Colonel Jorge Beauchef as commander and governor of Valdivia. On 6 March 1820, Colonel Beauchef overcame the royalists during the battle of El Toro. From Valdivia, Cochrane went to Chiloe. He failed in a ground attack on Ancud and was forced to retreat. After the battle of El Toro, he began to consolidate his army's presence in the southern Chilean region, excluding Chiloé.

== End of the New Homeland ==
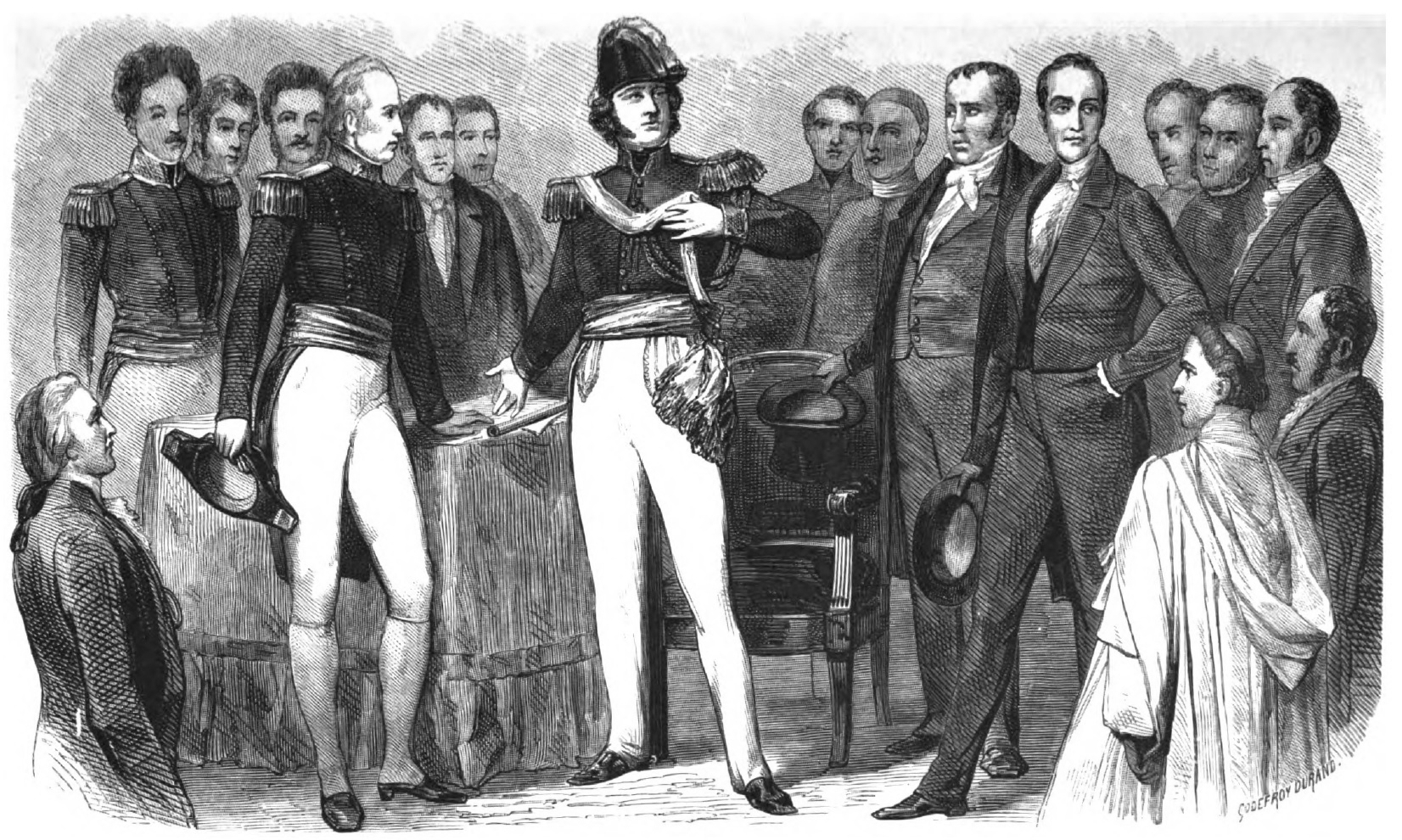
Abdication of Bernardo O'Higgins.

In Chilean historiography, the New Homeland is seen to have ended in 1823, with the resignation of O'Higgins in the open town council meeting of January 28. O'Higgins, emotional, said goodbye to the audience with the following words:

I am sorry not to deposit this insignia before the national assembly, from whom I had recently received it; I am sorry to retire without having consolidated the institutions that it had believed were appropriate for the country and that I had sworn to defend; But I have at least the consolation of leaving Chile independent of all foreign domination, respected abroad, covered with glory for its feats of arms.

I thank Divine Providence that has chosen me as an instrument of such goodness, and that has granted me the strength of mind necessary to resist the immense weight that the hazardous circumstances in which I have exercised command have made weigh upon me.

Now I am a simple citizen. While I have been invested with the first dignity of the republic, respect, if not for my person, at least for that high position, should have imposed silence on your complaints. Now you can speak without convenience. Let my accusers present themselves! I want to know the evils I have caused, the tears I have shed! Accuse me! If the misfortunes you throw in my face have been, not the precise effect of the time in which it was my lot to exercise the sum of power, but the relief of my evil passions, those misfortunes cannot be purged except with my blood. Take from me the vengeance you want, and I will not resist you! Here is my chest!

— Bernardo O'Higgins

However, the last Spanish territory in Chile, the island of Chiloé, would be conquered and annexed to the new Republic of Chile, only in January 1826, when the Treaty of Tantauco was signed, during the government of Ramón Freire, successor of O'Higgins.

== See also ==
- Chilean War of Independence
