= Francisco Andreví =

Catalan composer of Italian ancestry

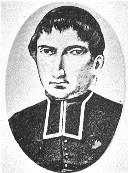

Francisco Andreví y Castellar (Catalan: Francesc Andreví i Castellar; 7 November 1786 – 23 November 1853) was a Catalan composer of Italian ancestry.

Francesc Andreví i castellar was a Catalan composer of Italian parentage. When he was eight he began his musical studies at La Seu d’Urgell. At fifteen he went to barcelona to continue his ecclesiastical career, and study organ with the Carmen convent organist P.Quintana and composition with Rev. Francisco Queralt, the cathedral chapel master. 3 years later he obtained the organist place at the Teresianes convent, and later at Magdalene’s. He Won for opposition in 1806 the master place at Tarifa cathedral, which he wasn’t able to practise due to the war with the French. At the age of 21, he obtained Segorbe’s one; he received holy orders there during 5 years. Barcelona’s Santa maria del mar chapel master between 1814 and 1819, of Sogorb, Valencia, Sevilla cathedrals on (1830) and Madrid royal chapel on (1831), for which he had to compete with Francisco Jose Olivares and Hilarion Eslava. At 1836 he left this position, -which was given to Mariano rodriguez de ledesma- due to difficulties aroused by some of the chapel musicians, and left to France, where he was Sant andreu de Bordeus cathedral chapel master (1836) before temporary established himself at Paris (1845). At his return to Barcelona at 1850, he was església de la merce’s chapel master, position where he stayed until his dead on 1853 and in addition he tutored musicians as Josep reventos i truch, Esteve Tusquets i maignon and others who became famous later on.

Among his works are 6 Masses, one Mass for the Dead, three Stabat mater, fifteen motets, nine Lamentations and a Tantum Ergo. Most like a significant part of the musical background conserved at Cervera Local Historical registry is a part o what was his personal archive.

He wrote numerous pieces, many of which are conserved in handwritten at Barcelona’s església de la mercè royal chapel. Some of them:

- An Stabat Mater
- A Requiem mass
- Some Lamentations
- Two miserere
- El Judici Final: (oratory)
- La dolcesa en la virtut: (sacred drama)

While he was at France he published:

- Traité d’Harmonie: (Paris. 1848) with a Spanish edition called: Tratado teórico de armonia y composición (Barcelona, 1848).
- Recueil de Cantiques: (Paris).

A large number of his pieces are conserved in different Catalonia musical Backgrounds: IFMuC, and also (TerC, MatC, SEO, CdE).
