= Plaça de Sant Felip Neri =

Square in Barcelona

Coordinates: 41.3834°N 2.1751°E

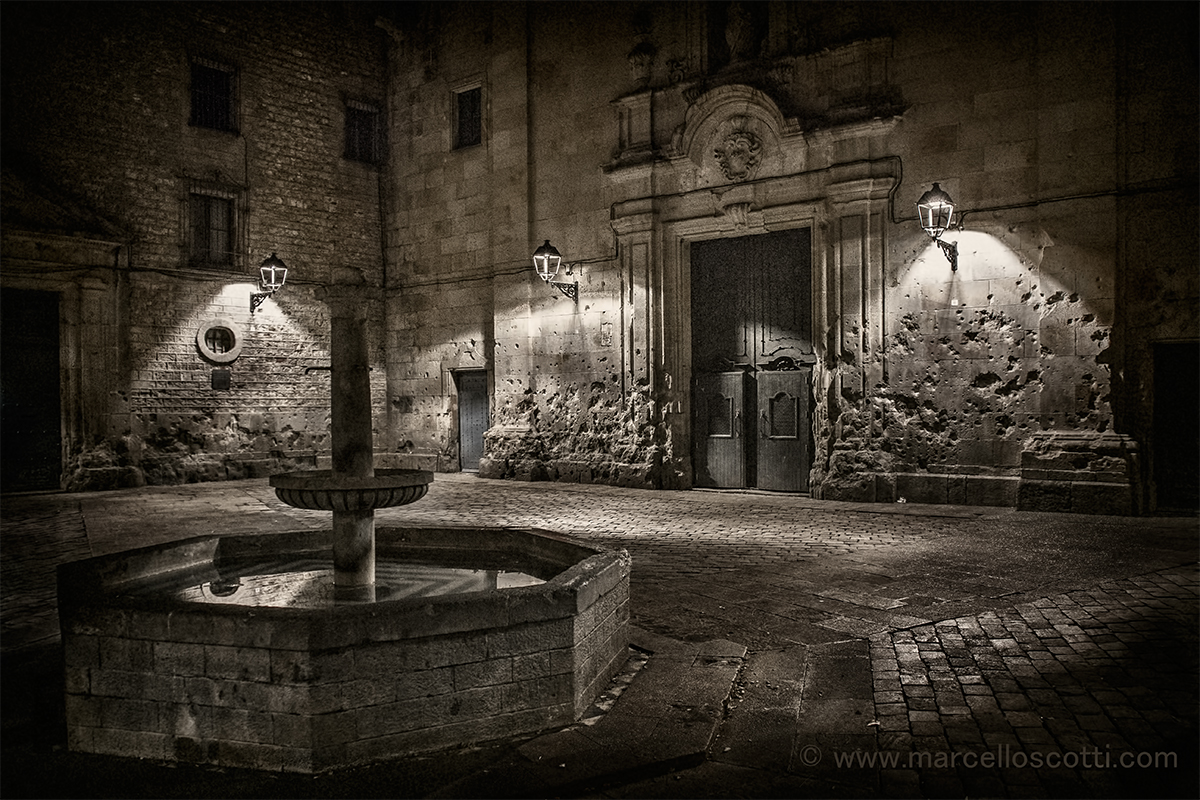
The church of the Saint Philip Neri and fountain at night

Plaça de Sant Felip Neri is a small square in the Gothic Quarter in the district of Ciutat Vella in Barcelona, Catalonia, Spain. The square takes its name from the Church of Saint Philip Neri, which presides over the square. To the right of the church is the School of Saint Felip Neri which uses the square as a playground. To the left of the church is a house used by the Oratory of Saint Philip Neri. In the centre of the square is an octagonal fountain, dedicated as a symbol of life. The architecture surrounding the square includes buildings of Renaissance and Baroque style.

== History ==
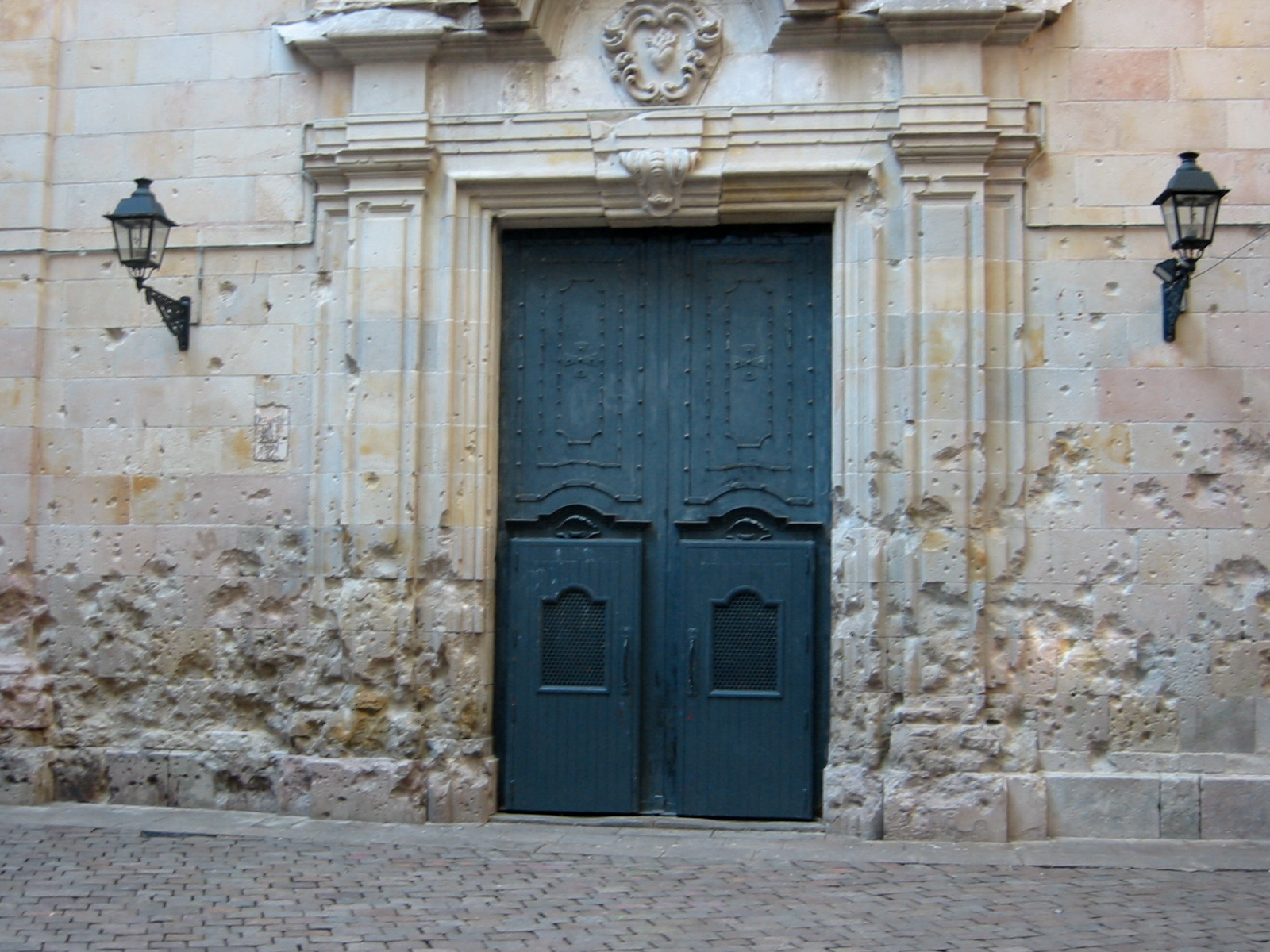
Pockmarked church walls from bombings

The square was once home to the Palace of Neri built in 1752. In the mid-20th century, Renaissance buildings from other areas of the city were moved stone by stone to the square, instead of demolishing them to make room for urban developments. When the hotel Neri was built it was faced in similar gothic stone to maintain the gothic style of the square. In 1938 during the Spanish Civil War, Francisco Franco laid siege to the city of Barcelona. On January 30, one of Franco's Nationalist forces bombed the church, killing 30 people, most of whom were children from the School of Sant Philip Neri and some of whom were refugee children from Madrid, who were in the church as it had been turned into a makeshift orphanage. As people pulled survivors from the rubble, a second bomb hit the square, killing 12 more bringing the death toll to 42. It was the second worst bombing hit in Barcelona during the war. Evidence of the bombings can be seen in the pockmarked walls of the church. Museu del Calçat, a footwear museum in the square was closed in 2015 and the building remains unused.

== Myths ==
A myth spread by the Francoist authorities stated that the pockmarks in the stone were from the bullets of an anarchist execution of church priests. This was spread in an attempt to cover up evidence of the 1938 bombings.

== Transport ==
=== Barcelona metro ===
The closest metro stations are the Jaume I on the L4 and Liceu on the L3 lines.

=== Buses ===
The following bus lines 45, 59, 91, 120, V13, V15, V17 and the Barcelona tourist bus.

=== Walking ===
It is close to the Barcelona Cathedral at the end of Carrer de Montjuïc del Bisbe.

== In Popular Culture ==
Plaça de Sant Felip Neri was one of the locations (along other places in Barcelona) of the American rock band Evanescence's My Immortal music video.
