= El Húsar de la Muerte =

1925 film

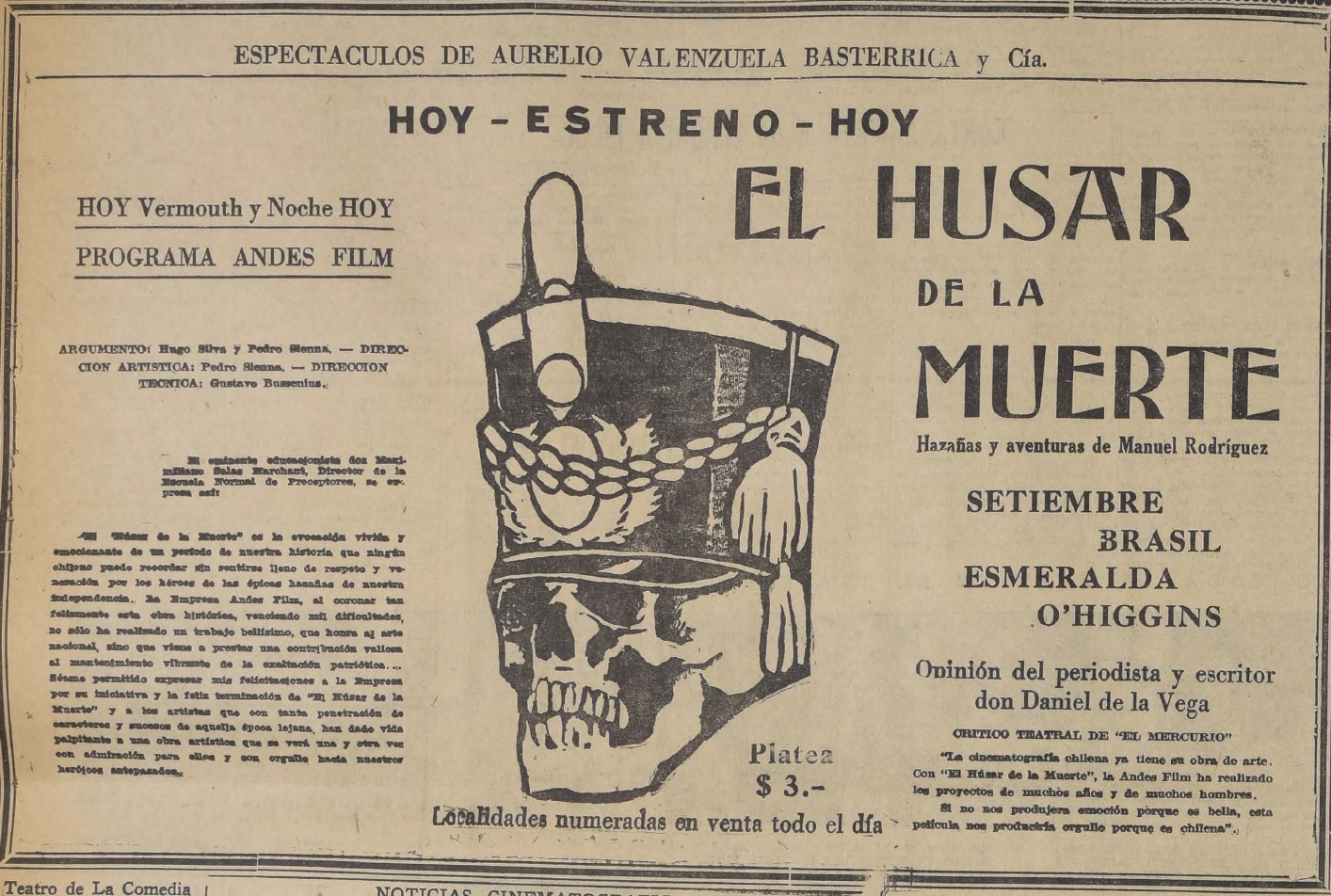
- A promotional ad in La Nación (1925)
- Directed by: Pedro Sienna
- Written by: Pedro Sienna; Hugo Silva
- Produced by: Alfredo Wolnitzki
- Starring: Pedro Sienna
- Cinematography: Gustavo Bussenius
- Distributed by: Andes Films
- Release date: 24 November 1925
- Running time: 65 minutes
- Country: Chile
- Language: Silent

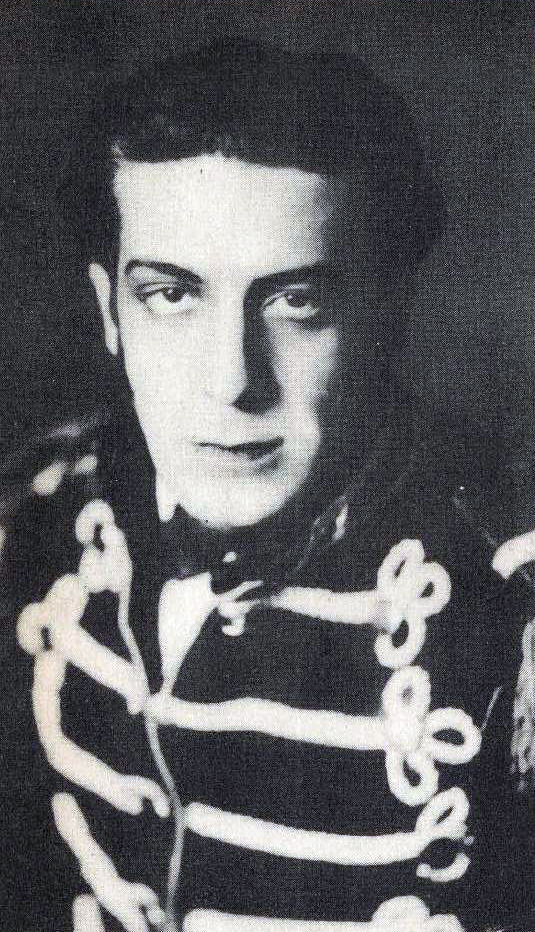
Pedro Sienna as Manuel Rodríguez

El Húsar de la Muerte (English: The Hussar of Death) is a 1925 Chilean silent film directed by and starring Pedro Sienna. The movie depicts the adventures of guerrilla leader Manuel Rodríguez during the Reconquista, culminating in his death in 1818.

The film had its premiere in Santiago, Chile on 24 November 1925.

== Plot ==
The movie begins after the Battle of Rancagua in 1814, where the royalist forces defeated the Chileans. Despite their victory, Manuel Rodríguez sends a note to the royalists warning them that their reign will soon end, and freedom is near. The patriots are inspired when Rodríguez visits them and informs them of his plans to meet with San Martín in Mendoza to discuss their next steps.

Upon returning, Rodríguez defeats two Talaveras soldiers, which alarms the royalists, especially Captain Vicente San Bruno. To avoid being caught, Rodríguez disguises himself and falls in love with Carmen de Aguirre, daughter of the Marquis of Aguirre.

Rodríguez recruits patriots to fight for their independence, including "el huacho pelao," a boy who decides to join the rebellion. Meanwhile, the royalists are in pursuit of Rodríguez, but he manages to elude them.

Rodríguez enters Governor Francisco Casimiro Marco del Pont's house in disguise and steals some documents with the help of "el huacho pelao." The governor offers a reward for anyone who captures Rodríguez, and one of his men betrays him. However, Rodríguez discovers this before the authorities arrive.

The royalists corner Rodríguez at the Aguirre estate, where he is wounded and taken care of by Carmen. When Captain San Bruno interrogates him, Rodríguez defeats him in a sword fight. He bids farewell to Carmen before leaving for Mendoza to give San Martín the stolen documents.

The movie ends with subtitles detailing subsequent events such as the Battle of Maipú and O'Higgins' rise to power. A scene shows a soldier narrating Rodríguez's death to his friends, who then bury him.

== Production & film restoration ==
Director Pedro Sienna selected the cast from people that he found on the street. The film was considered lost until 1959, when it was found in deplorable condition and with some title cards incomplete, but thanks to Pedro Sienna's own supervision, the film was restored in 1962 by Cineteca de la Universidad de Chile, with music by Sergio Ortega (with the Chilean government help).

== Cast ==
| Actor | Character |
|---|---|
| Pedro Sienna | Manuel Rodríguez |
| Clara Werther | Carmen de Aguirre |
| Piet Van Ravenstein | |
| Guillermo Barrientos | El Huacho Pelao |
| María de Hanning | |
| Dolores Anziani | Charito |
| Hugo Silva | Home making - Patriotical |
| Piet van Ravebstein | |
| Luis Baeza | |
| Octavio Soto | |
| Federico Geimza | |
| Guillermo Barrientos | |
| Guillermo Barrientos | |
| Emilia Sierra | |
| Ángel Díaz | |
| Víctor Véjar | |
