= Conservative Republic =

Period of Chilean history from 1826 to 1861

Republic of Chile República de Chile
- 1831–1861
- Flag Coat of arms

- Capital: Santiago
- Common languages: Spanish
- Government: Unitary presidential republic
- President
  - 1830–1831: Jose Tomas Ovalle
  - 1831–1841: Jose Joaquin Prieto
  - 1841–1851: Manuel Bulnes
  - 1851-1861: Manuel Montt
- Vice President
  - 1826: Agustín Eyzaguirre
  - 1827: Francisco Antonio Pinto
  - 1829: Joaquín Vicuña
  - 1830: José Tomás Ovalle
  - 1831–1833: Diego Portales
- History
  - Battle of Lircay: 17 April 1831
  - Inauguration of Jose Joaquin Perez: 18 September 1861
Preceded by	Succeeded by
Organization of the Republic; Governorate of Chiloé	Liberal Republic; Kingdom of Araucanía and Patagonia

In Chilean historiography, the Conservative Republic (Spanish: República Conservadora) was a period of Chilean history that extended between 1831 and 1861, characterized by the hegemony of the conservative party, whose supporters were called pelucones. It began with the defeat of the pipiolos (Liberals) by the pelucones at the Battle of Lircay ending the Chilean Civil War of 1829–30. Chile's victory in the War of the Confederation has also been linked to the consolidation of the Conservative Republic. It concluded in 1861 with the election of the independent Jose Joaquin Perez as president, ending the hegemony of the conservative party.

== See also ==
- Diego Portales
- War of the Confederation
