= Ramón Carnicer =

Spanish musician (1789–1855)

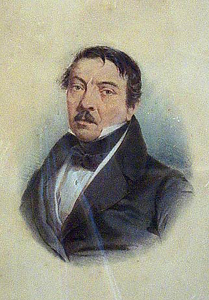
- Portrait of Carnicer, c. 1830
- Born: Ramón Carnicer i Batlle; October 24, 1789; Tàrrega, Catalonia, Spain
- Died: March 17, 1855 (aged 65); Madrid, Spain
- Education: Carles Baguer
- Occupations: Composer, conductor and opera house director
- Known for: Chile national anthem
- Relatives: brother: Miquel Carnicer (1796–1866), guitarist

Ramón Carnicer i Batlle (October 24, 1789 – March 17, 1855) was a Spanish composer and opera conductor, today he is best known for composing the National Anthem of Chile, his best work.

== Biography ==
Carnicer was born in Tàrrega, Spain. He was a pupil of Francesc Queralt. His first major positions were as conductor for the opera, and he was influential in the development of the Spanish national opera style, zarzuela. He conducted the Italian Opera in Barcelona from 1818 to 1820, and the Royal Opera in Madrid from 1828 to 1830, as well as composing nine operas.

In 1830, he accepted a position as professor of composition at the Madrid Conservatory, which he would retain until his retirement in 1854. He composed a variety of songs, church music, and symphonies; his best-remembered composition today being the National Anthem of Chile. He died in Madrid in 1855.

== Works ==
=== Opera ===
Some of his operas are lost, but are known from references in documents of the period. However the authorship of several of the pieces is not fully clear.

- Adele di Lusignano: Melodramma semiserio (1819), Opera in Italian, in two acts
- Elena e Costantino: Dramma eroico-comico in due atti (1821, premiered again in 2005), Opera in Italian, libretto by Andrea Leone Tottola
- Il dissoluto punito, ossia Don Giovanni Tenorio (1822, premiered again in 2006), Opera in Italian, in two acts, libretto by Giovanni Bertati.
- Elena e Malvina (1827), Opera in two acts
- Cristoforo Colombo (1829), Opera
- Eufemio di Messina (1832), Opera
- Guglielmo Tell (1834), Opera
- Eran due or sono tre, o sea, Gli esposti (1836), Opera buffa in two acts. Libretto by Jacopo Ferretti
- Ismalia o Morte ed amore (1838), Opera in two acts
- Laura y Don Gonzalo (1841), òpera in 4 acts. Music attributed to Carnicer. Libretto attributed to Manuel Bretón de los Herreros
- Ipermestra (1843), drama in three acts. Words by Pietro Metastasio. Authorship discussed
- Lucrezia Borgia. Attributed opera, some believe he only collaborated in the composition
- El sacristán de Toledo, opera. It's said he had only collaborated, composing incidental music

=== Instrumental ===
- Fantasía en mi bemol mayor, for clarinet
- Gran sinfonía en Re (1839)
- Fantasía original para clarinete con acompañamiento de piano (1849)
- Capricho para contrabajo con acompañamiento de piano (1852) (Capricho for doublebass with piano accompaniment)
- Melodía fantástica con acompañamiento de piano
- Sinfonía oriental
- Solo de flauta (solo for flute)
- Salmòdia for organ
- 6 Sonates per a instrument de tecla'
- Obertura (sinfonía) Composed for the premier of the opera Il barbiere di Siviglia by Rossini in Barcelona (1818)
- A second overture for that same opera

=== Vocal ===
- El caramba: canción andaluza (ca. 1832), Voice and piano or guitar
- Completas Fratres a 4 v., 4 voices, 6 instruments, accompaniment and continuo
- La criada: canción española (ca. 1832), voice, guitar and piano
- El currillo: canción andaluza (ca. 1835), voice, guitar and piano
- La gitanilla (ca. 1831), song for voice, guitar and piano
- Himno a los defensores de Gandesa (1838).
- Himno patrio de la República de Chile (1828)
- Himno patriótico, con motivo de la publicación del Estatuto Real (1834)
- Himno patriótico [para el] cumpleaños de la Reina Doña Isabel II (1835)
- El julepe: polo (1823), song for voice and guitar
- Misa de Réquiem (1929), 4 voices and orchestra, in Latin. For Maria Josepha Amalia de Saxony, Ferdinand VII third wife
- Misa de Réquiem (1842), 4 voices and orchestra, in Latin
- Misa solemne (entre 1806 i 1808), 8 voices and orchestra
- El músico y el poeta (Los maestros de la Raboso), tonadilla a dúo
- El no sé, song for voice, guitar and piano
- La noticia feliz: polo y seguidillas (1823), song for voice, guitar and piano
- El nuevo sereni (1825), song for voice, guitar and piano or guitar
- Odas de Anacreonte (1832), text original grec d'Anacreont i traducció castellana de José del Castillo y Ayensa, comprèn les cançons per a veu i piano De si mismo, A una muchacha i Del amor y la abeja
- El poder de las mugeres: canción española con acompañamiento de piano y guitarra (1836)
- Psalmodia que contiene todos los tonos (1818)
- Tantum Ergo
- Tonadilla de la cantinera (1813)
- Vigilias con orquesta para las exequias de Fernando VII (1833), in Latin
- El chairo: canción española cantada en la ópera "El barbero de Sevilla" (1833), lyrics by Agustín Azcona
