= Chilean National Song =

Chilean national anthem (1819–1847)

Canción Nacional Chilena
English: Chilean National Song
- National anthem of Chile
- Lyrics: Bernardo de Vera y Pintado, September 20, 1819
- Music: Manuel Robles Gutiérrez, 1820
- Adopted: September 20, 1819 (lyrics); August 20, 1820 (music)
- Relinquished: December 23, 1828 (music); September 17, 1847 (lyrics)
- Succeeded by: National Anthem of Chile

Audio sample
- Instrumental version: file; help

Chilean National Song
- Key: C major, E major, B# major,

Official orchestral and vocal recording

Chilean National Song (Spanish: Canción Nacional Chilena) was the national anthem of Chile, between 1819 and 1847. It was written by Bernardo de Vera y Pintado and composed by Manuel Robles.

== Lyrics ==
=== Spanish ===
I
Ciudadanos: el amor sagrado
de la patria os convoca la lid:
libertad: es el eco de alarma,
la divisa: triunfar o morir.
El cadalso o la antigua cadena,
os presenta el soberbio español:
arrancad el puñal al tirano,
quebrantad ese cuello feroz.

Chorus:
Dulce patria, recibe los votos
con que Chile en tus aras juró
que, o la tumba serás de los libres,
o el asilo contra la opresión.

II
Habituarnos, quisieron tres siglos
del esclavo, a la suerte infelíz
que, al sonar de sus propias cadenas
más aprende a cantar, que a gemir.
Pero el fuerte clamor de la patria,
ese ruido espantoso acalló
y las voces de la independencia
penetraron hasta el corazón.

Chorus

III
En sus ojos hermosos, la patria,
nuevas luces empieza a sentir
y, observando sus altos derechos,
se ha encendido en ardor varonil.
De virtud y justicia rodeada,
a los pueblos del orbe anunció:
que, con sangre de Arauco, ha firmado
la gran carta de emancipación.

Chorus

IV
Los tiranos, en rabia, encendidos
y, tocando de cerca su fin,
desplegaron la furia impotente,
aunque en vano se halaga en destruir.
Ciudadanos: mirad en el campo
el cadáver del vil invasor,
que perezca ese cruel, que el sepulcro
tan lejano a su cuna buscó.

Chorus

V
Esos valles también ved, chilenos
que, el eterno quiso bendecir,
y en que ríe la naturaleza,
aunque ajada del déspota vil.
Al amigo y al deudo más caro,
sirven hoy de sepulcro y de honor,
mas la sangre del héroe es fecunda,
y en cada hombre cuenta un vengador.

Chorus

VI
Del silencio profundo en que habitan
esos manes ilustres, oíd
que, os reclamen venganza, chilenos,
y, en venganza a la guerra acudid.
De Lautaro, Colocolo y Rengo,
reanimad el nativo valor,
y empeñad el coraje en las fieras,
que la España, a extinguirnos, mandó.

Chorus

VII
Esos monstruos que cargan consigo
el carácter infame y servil,
¿Cómo pueden jamás compararse
con los héroes del cinco de abril?
Ellos sirven al mismo tirano
que, su ley y su sangre burló...
por la patria, nosotros peleamos
nuestra vida lealtad y honor.

Chorus

VIII
Por el mar y la tierra amenazan
los secuaces del déspota vil,
pero toda la naturaleza
los espera para combatir.
El Pacífico, al sud y occidente,
al oriente: los Ándes y el sol,
por el norte: un inmenso desierto
y el centro: libertad y unión.

Chorus

IX
Ved la insignia con que, en Chacabuco,
al intruso supisteis rendir,
y el augusto tricolor que, en Maipo,
en un día de triunfo nos dio mil.
Vedle ya, señoreando un océano
y, flameando sobre el fiero león,
se estremece a su vista, el íbero,
nuestros pechos inflama el valor.

Chorus

X
Ciudadanos, la gloria presida,
de la patria, el destino felíz,
y podrán, las edades futuras,
a sus padres, así bendecir.
Venturosas, mil veces, las vidas
con que Chile, su dicha afianzó...
si quedare un tirano, su sangre
de los héroes escriba el blasón.

=== English translation ===
I
Citizens: sacred love
of the homeland summons you the lid:
freedom: it is the echo of alarm, the motto: succeed or die.
The scaffold or the ancient chain,
presents the superb Spanish:
pull out the dagger from the tyrant,
break that fierce neck.

Chorus:
Sweet Homeland, receive the vows
That Chile gave you on your altars
That, you be either the tomb of the free,
Or a refuge from oppression.

II
Habituate us, they wanted three centuries
from the slave, to the unhappy fate
that, at the sound of their own chains
he learns to sing more than to moan.
But the loud cry of the homeland,
that awful noise silenced
and the voices of independence
penetrated to the heart.

Chorus

III
In her beautiful eyes, the homeland,
new lights begin to feel
and, observing the high rights of her,
she has ignited in manly ardor.
Of virtue and justice surrounded,
to the peoples of the world he announced:
that, with Arauco's blood, he has signed
the great emancipation card.

Chorus

IV
The tyrants, in rage, turned on and, close to its end,
they displayed helpless fury,
though in vain he flattered himself in destroying.
Citizens: look in the field
the corpse of the vile invader,
may that cruel perish, may the grave
so far to the cradle he sought.

Chorus

V
See those valleys too, Chileans
that the eternal wanted to bless,
and in which nature laughs,
though marred by the vile despot.
To the friend and the dearest debtor,
they serve today as a grave and honor,
but the hero's blood is fertile,
and in every man there is an avenger.

Chorus

VI
Of the deep silence in which they inhabit
those illustrious men, hear
Let them claim revenge on you, Chileans,
and, in revenge to the war go.
From Lautaro, Colocolo and Rengo,
revive the native courage,
and pledge your courage in the beasts,
that Spain, to extinguish us, commanded.

Chorus

VII
Those monsters that carry with them
the infamous and servile character,
How can they ever compare
with the heroes of the fifth of April?
They serve the same tyrant
that, his law and his blood mocked...
for the country, we fight
our life loyalty and honor.

Chorus

VIII
By sea and land they threaten
the henchmen of the vile despot,
but all nature
awaits you to fight.
The Pacific, to the south and west,
to the east: the Andes and the sun,
to the north: an immense desert
and the center: freedom and union.

Chorus

IX
See the insignia with which, in Chacabuco,
you knew how to surrender the intruder,
and the august tricolor that, in Maipo,
on a day of triumph he gave us a thousand.
See him now, dominating an ocean
and, flaming over the fierce lion,
shudders at the sight of him, the Iberian,
our breasts inflame the courage.

Chorus

X
Citizens, glory presides,
of the homeland, the happy destiny,
and may, future ages,
their parents, thus bless. Adventurous a thousand times lives
with which Chile, its happiness strengthened...
if I remain a tyrant, his blood
of the heroes write the blazon.

Chorus
