= Baltasar Saldoni =

Spanish musicologist and composer (1807–1889)

Baltasar Simón Tito Saldoni i Remendo (Barcelona, 4 January 1807 - Madrid, 3 December 1889) was a Spanish composer and musicologist. He was a pupil of Francesc Queralt.
