= Eusebio Lillo =

Chilean poet, politician (1826–1910)

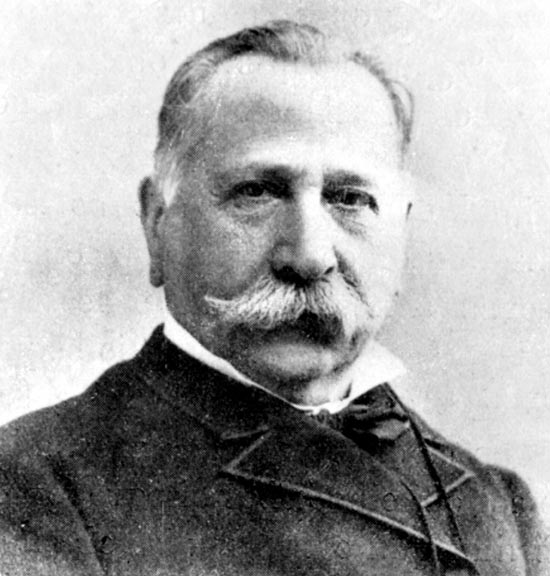
- Born: Eusebio Lillo Robles; August 14, 1826; Santiago, Chile
- Died: July 8, 1920 (aged 93); Santiago, Chile
- Education: Instituto Nacional General José Miguel Carrera
- Occupations: Poet, writer, politician, businessman
- Writing career
- Language: Spanish
- Period: Nineteenth century
- Genre: Romanticism
- Notable work: Chilean national anthem

Eusebio Lillo Robles (born Santiago, Chile August 14, 1826; died 8 July 1910) was a Chilean poet, journalist and politician. He is the writer of the lyrics of the Chilean National Anthem.

== Biography ==
The son of Agustín Lillo and Dolores Robles, Agustín died when Lillo was young. Lillo studied in the General José Miguel Carrera National Institute and was one of the many pupils of Andrés Bello. He was a great reader from a very young age, and it is known that he organized raffles with his old books to fund his studies.

Lillo was a member of the Young Liberals of Chile, an organization that eventually became the "Sociedad de la Igualdad" (Equality Society), who fought for a society where every man was equal. He is part of the generation of 1842, a group that represented Romanticism (literary movement) in Chile.

From 1842 onwards, he collaborated with the "Sociedad Literaria de Santiago" (Santiago Literature Society), and from 1844 he wrote for the newspaper "El siglo". That same year, he won an award from the "Sociedad Literaria" for his "Canto al dieciocho de septiembre" (Song of September 18).

In 1846, he left his studies to serve as an assistant officer in the Ministry of Interior. At the same time, he worked as a correspondent for the newspapers El Mercurio de Valparaíso and El Comercio, both from Valparaíso.

In 1847 the Minister of Interior and Foreign Affairs, Manuel Camilo Vial, commissioned him to write the lyrics of the Chilean national anthem.

He was a supporter and promoter of the revolution of 1851, the first attempt to put a liberal government into power. As a result, he was sent to jail and condemned to death during the government of Manuel Montt, but, as he was the writer of the lyrics of the National Anthem, the sentence was changed to exile, and he was sent to the southern city of Valdivia, from which he fled to Lima.

He came back to Chile in 1852, and worked as a journalist for the newspaper "La Patria" until 1857. He moved to Bolivia, where he created the Bank of La Paz, and contributed to the country's mining industry.

In 1878, he went back to Chile and was elected mayor of Santiago, and then superintendent of Curicó. He took part in the War of the Pacific as a diplomat and secretary of a naval squadron. He represented Chile during the failed Arica Conference in 1880 between Bolivia, Chile and Peru. He would have also represented Chile in secret negotiations between Chile and Bolivia in order to secure for Bolivia Tacna and Tarapacá and Arica for Chile.

Lillo became a senator for the region of Talca in 1882 and then Minister of the Interior for the government of José Manuel Balmaceda in 1886. He became one of Balmaceda's closest allies, as evidenced by the fact that Balmaceda requested the custody of his political will.

In 1888 he traveled through Europe, and returned to Santiago in 1889, where, as requested, he published Balmaceda's political will, as was requested for Balmaceda.

Finally, Eusebio Lillo died in Santiago on 8 July 1910.

== Work ==
Lillo's best known work is the lyrics of Chile's national anthem. He was also part of the Chilean literary movement known as the "Generacion de 1842", a literary movement that represented Romanticism in Chile.

=== Some of his poems ===
- Dos Almas
- La mujer limeña
- El Junco
- Rosa y Carlos
- El Imperial
- Una Lágrima
- Deseos
- Himno nacional (National Anthem)

== See also ==
- Chilean national anthem
- Chilean literature
- Romanticism
