= Pedro Sienna =

Chilean actor

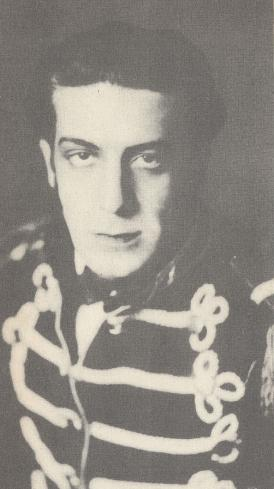
Pedro Sienna as Manuel Rodríguez in "The Hussar of Death"

Pedro Sienna (13 May 1893—20 March 1972) was a Chilean playwright, poet, journalist, art critic and theatre and movie actor who is also remembered as one of his country's pioneering directors in the early years of silent film.

He was married to Julia Benavides Hübler. They had three children: two were twins who died as toddlers, and Carmen Julia.

== Career ==
A native of San Fernando, Pedro Pérez Cordero used the professional pen name Pedro Sienna. He briefly studied at the Liceo Neandro Schilling at his birthplace, and completed his secondary studies at the Instituto Nacional General José Miguel Carrera in Santiago.

He began his association with film by directing and starring in El Hombre de acero (1917) and Los Payasos se van (1921).

In 1925, he wrote, directed and starred in the film considered a classic of Chilean silent cinema, El Húsar de la muerte (The Death Hussar).

As a highly respected author, he wrote Muecas en la Sombra, La Caverna de los Murciélagos, Recuerdos del Soldado Desconocido, Memorias de la Vida del Teatro and the biographical La vida pintoresca de Arturo Bührle.

On 27 December 1966, at the age of 73, Pedro Sienna was awarded the country's national art prize, Premio Nacional de Arte de Chile. He died in Santiago eight weeks short of his 79th birthday.

== Filmography ==
As director, writer and actor:

- 1925: El Húsar de la muerte

As director and actor:

- 1917: El Hombre de acero
- 1921: Los Payasos se van
- 1922: El Empuje de una raza
- 1924: Un Grito en el mar
- 1926: La Última trasnochada

As actor:

- 1918: Todo por la patria or El giron de la bandera (directed by Arturo Mario)
- 1920: Manuel Rodríguez (directed by Arturo Mario)
