= Organization of the Republic =

Period of the history of Chile, 1823–1830

Republic of Chile República de Chile
- 1823–1830
- Flag Coat of arms

- The territories of the Captaincy.
- Religion: Catholicism (official)
- Government: Republic
- Historical era: Historical period
  - Established: 1823
  - Disestablished: 1830
- Currency: Peso Independent
Preceded by	Succeeded by
New Fatherland	Conservative Republic

The Organization of the Republic is the period of the history of Chile that occurred between the abdication of Bernardo O'Higgins, on 28 January 1823, and the promulgation of the Conservative Constitution, on 25 May 1833.

These years were characterized by the constant search for an adequate institutional order for the State of Chile. Although the period of constitutional trials dated back to the government of O'Higgins (Constitutions of 1818 and 1822), during this period the struggle for organization became more turbulent, given the constant struggles between the aristocracy, military officers and ideologues.

During this period, three constitutions were implemented: the Moralist Constitution (written by Juan Egaña), the Federal Laws (written mainly by José Miguel Infante), and the Liberal Constitution (written by José Joaquín de Mora in 1828).

== Governments ==
The governments that ruled Chile during this period were numerous, marked by the resignation of rulers, the inability to establish order and political inexperience, a phenomenon that, despite being harmful, bore fruit in the absence of the presence of caudillos, which softened the violence and allowed Chile to stabilize much more easily than the rest of the region. Due to their number, only the governments that had the greatest significance are named.

=== Government of Ramón Freire (1823-1827) ===
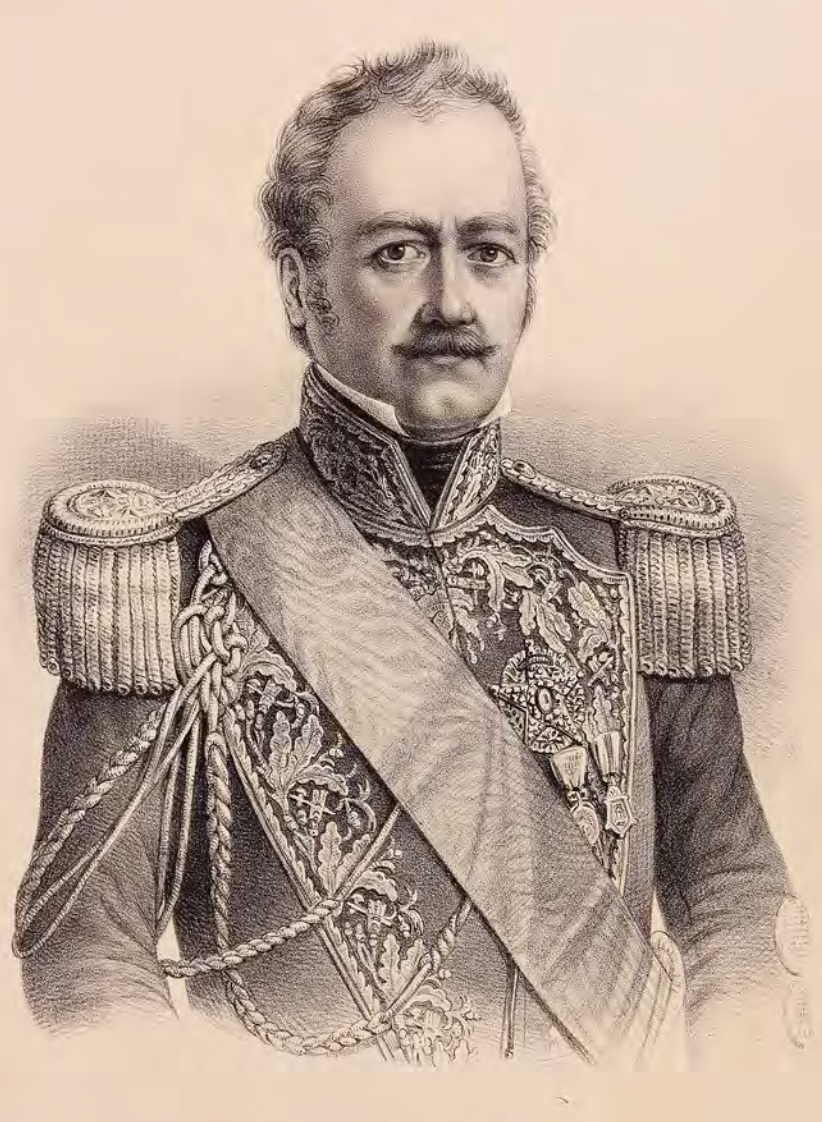
Ramón Freire.

After the resignation of O'Higgins, on 28 January 1823, a Government Board assumed control of the country, deciding to hand over power to Ramón Freire, under the position of Supreme Director (the position of president would not be created until 1826). Freire was respected by the Chilean troops for his brilliant performance in the campaigns of Independence. During this period he was advised by Juan Egaña.

One of Freire's first acts was to end the residency trial of O'Higgins, who managed to leave Chile honorably and settle in Lima, where he would live the rest of his life. He also signed the decree that established Chile as the official name of the country.

Ramón Freire's government was marked by great advances, but also by financial problems, which led to the need to seize the assets of the clergy and to postpone the payment of the foreign debt (a loan from Italy). Despite this, the money was not enough to pay the salaries of the army, which rebelled on numerous occasions. It was necessary to cede the Tobacco Shop to the firm Portales y Cea (1824), in order for it to cancel the foreign debt. The deal failed after two years. Nevertheless, Freire carried out humanitarian works, such as the definitive abolition of slavery in July 1823, managed by José Miguel Infante. During this period, the Muzzi Mission arrived in Chile, a work of the Catholic Church to solve the differences between it and the State, which was a complete failure.

On 29 December 1823, Freire promulgated the Political and Permanent Constitution of the State of Chile of 1823, also called the Moralist Constitution due to its norms, which restricted and directed the activities of citizens. This magna carta was a failure and was progressively suspended in the following months and years.

After a failed expedition in 1824, Ramón Freire ended the territorial independence of Chile with the incorporation of Chiloé in the battles of Pudeto and Bellavista (January 1826), which led to the signing of the Treaty of Tantauco. In July 1826, due to political instability, he resigned from the position of supreme director, favoring his successor, Manuel Blanco Encalada.

=== Government of Manuel Blanco Encalada (1826) ===
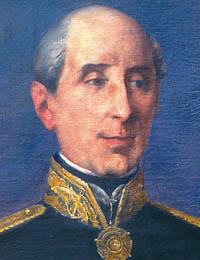
Manuel Blanco Encalada, first president of Chile.

Admiral and general Manuel Blanco Encalada, elected by Congress to form an interim government, took office on 9 July 1826, after Ramón Freire resigned. The prestigious reputation that Blanco Encalada had gained during his participation in the war of independence was one of the dominant factors that led to his victory in that election.

Until this point, the heads of state of independent Chile had held the office of Supreme Director. The admiral, however, was the first to use the current title of President. (Note: Between 1610 and 1799 the governors and captains general of the Kingdom of Chile were also called Presidents of the Royal Audience.)

Under the government of Blanco Encalada, a series of laws were approved that initiated the practice of the federal system in Chile. However, the Federal Laws of 1826, which divided Chile into autonomous provinces in the manner of Mexico or the United States, proved unworkable. For this reason, Blanco Encalada resigned on 9 September, just two months after taking office, highlighting the failure of federalism.

=== Government of Agustín de Eyzaguirre (1826–1827) ===
Agustín de Eyzaguirre assumed the first magistracy before the resignation of his predecessor, and governed, like him, in an interim capacity, until 25 January 1827.

His government was characterized by the instability produced by the development of federal system, which produced a constant struggle between the provinces and repeated riots at the time of the elections, and the inefficiency of the collection of taxes.

=== The Campino uprising ===
In 1827 the final blow to the federal system and its government took place. The coup d'état led by Colonel Enrique Campino took place on the night of 24–25 January. Campino deposed the president, installing himself in the government palace, this being an attack directed directly against the establists, his first action being the imprisonment of the minister of the interior, Manuel José Gandarillas, the interim minister of war, Tomás Ovejero and Diego Portales among many other members of the National Congress of Chile.

Campino, mounted on his horse, arrived at the door of the room ordering Elizondo, who at that moment was presiding over the session, to dissolve it immediately, which led to the protest of those who were in it. To this, Campino responded by bringing a company of grenadiers into the room. Without getting anyone to leave the session, the head of the company ordered the order "Aim!", to which the deputies responded by quickly leaving the room with the exception of don Diego José Benavente, who remained in his place without the slightest intention of leaving. In the galleries some characters belonging to the public remained hidden under the seats, one of them being Clemente Díaz, who snatched the sword from a colonel and lunged at the troops.

Taking this as an example, some of the deputies who had left the room decided to confront this intrusion again, thus dominating the situation. Once again gathered, the deputies made the decision to make a temporary agreement with General Freire, who, when trying to address Campino, was told that I have a culverin ready to be unleashed on Your Excellency if you approach. Freire, then, went to Aconcagua with some forces in order to organize a resistance. After this, a council of war was called where Francisco Antonio Pinto would be proclaimed as the new President of Chile.

Portales, who was still in prison, managed to convince Major Maruri to lead the counterrevolution against Campino, which joined the forces of Ramón Freire, thus ending the conflict.

=== The Government Junta and Francisco Ruiz-Tagle (1830) ===
After an agreement, a provisional government junta was appointed to end the Acephaly of the Executive, presided by José Tomás Ovalle. This junta, considered to be a consensus, elected a Congress of Plenipotentiaries, reformed the electoral law and tried to give power to the pelucón faction, since its president (Ovalle) was a recognized member of this faction.

The junta called for brief elections in Congress and Francisco Ruiz-Tagle Portales were elected as President of Chile and Ovalle as Vice President. However, Ruiz-Tagle was pressured by the Estanco faction to resign.

=== Government of José Tomás Ovalle (1830) ===
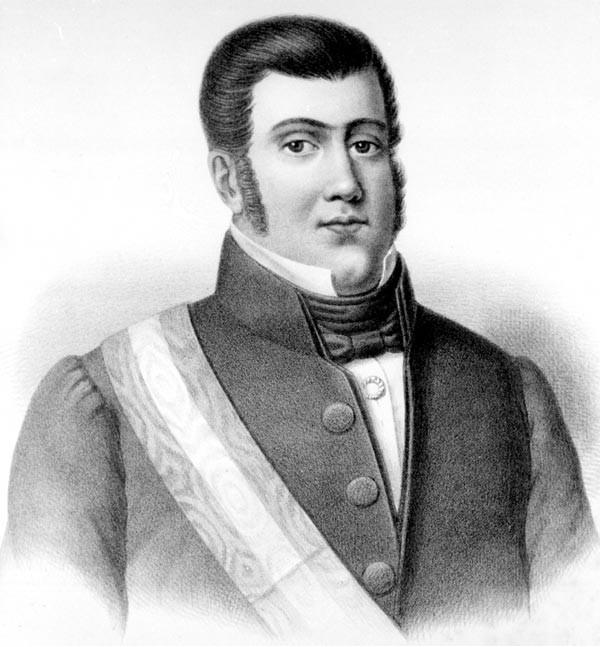
José Tomás Ovalle; under his provisional government, the conservatives consolidated their control of the country, ending this era.

On 1 April 1830, Vice President José Tomás Ovalle assumed the Presidency of Chile, appointing Diego Portales (head of the estanquero faction) as plenipotentiary minister.

The Ovalle government transformed the country in a decisive way: the ongoing civil war ended with the Battle of Lircay and the Treaty of Cuz-Cuz, consolidating the conservatives in power and beginning the process of transition towards the Conservative Republic. Ovalle tried to repeal the constitution and, although at first he did not succeed, he later received extraordinary powers and a Convention was called to reform it.

Thus, on 25 May 1833, the Constitution of 1833 was promulgated, marking the formal beginning of the Conservative Republic. The liberals were exiled and the government was centralized.

In less than a year, Ovalle's provisional government managed to change the course of the entire period. Furthermore, with rigorous measures, the figure of Ramón Freire was increasingly overshadowed by the authorities and the instability that had arisen was overcome.

Almost a year into his government, President Ovalle died, and was succeeded by his vice president, Fernando Errázuriz Aldunate. Finally, he called for elections, where Pinto and the general who triumphed in the revolution Joaquín Prieto ran. The latter won the elections by an overwhelming majority, ensuring the continuity of the Conservative Republic.

== Political factions ==
- Pelucones: A faction formed mainly by the Castilian-Basque aristocracy Santiago. They sought a centralized, authoritarian administration, governed by collegiate bodies (boards or congresses). They were Conservative in character and were very attached to the Catholic Church.
- Pipiolos: Of a liberal character, they sought the priority of human rights and freedoms, the hasty establishment of a democratic system, believing that laws shaped a nation. They were mainly young doctors, intellectuals and military men. They were deeply influenced by the ideals of the French Revolution and sought fundamental changes that would mean total and definitive independence from Spain. One of its main representatives was Ramón Freire Serrano.
- Federals: They were radicalized liberals based on the great development of the United States. They were led by José Miguel Infante and sought the implementation of the federal system in Chile, which materialized during the presidential government of Manuel Blanco Encalada, in 1826.
- Estanqueros: Group composed mainly of the big businessmen who emerged as a result of the liberalization of foreign trade (which occurred in the Patria Nueva), dominating the monopoly (estanco) of various articles at a cheap price. They sought the establishment of an authoritarian, centralized, impersonal and provisional government, where the State would be respected regardless of the methods used. They wanted a country where the President of the Republic would predominate, in order to prepare Chile for a future democracy, since they did not consider the Chilean people yet fit for civic work. They were led by Diego Portales.
- O'Higginistas: Generally aristocrats from Concepción, military officers and personal friends of the former Supreme Director, Bernardo O'Higgins. They saw the only solution to the country's problems as the country's return from exile in Peru after his abdication in January 1823. One of its main representatives was José Joaquín Prieto, general of Concepción who, however, upon taking power after the Battle of Lircay, did not allow O'Higgins to return to Chile, by order of Diego Portales.

== Notes ==
Preceded by Patria Nueva	Periods of the History of Chile 28 January 1823–17 April 1830	Succeeded by Conservative Republic
