= Manuel Rodríguez Erdoíza =

Chilean lawyer and guerrilla leader

Manuel Rodríguez
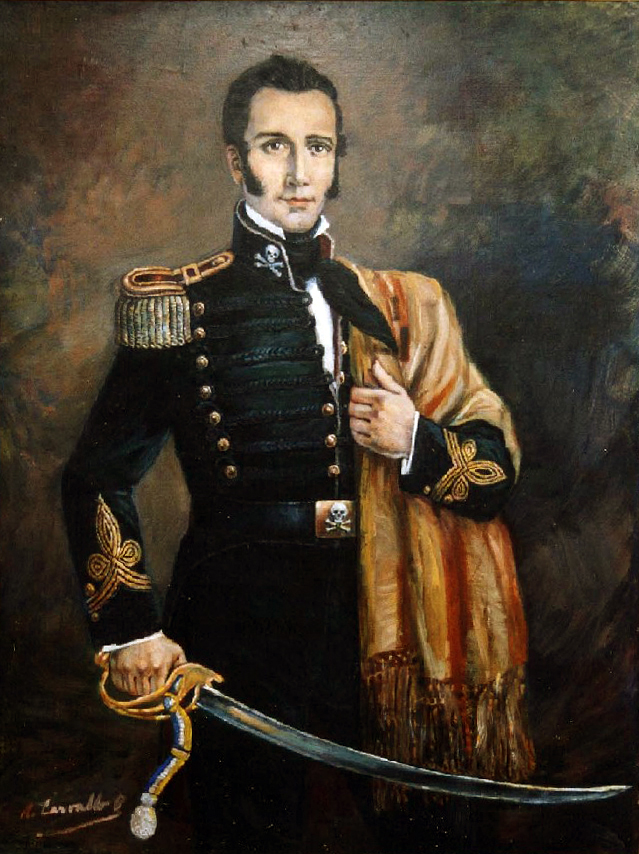
- Wearing his Húsares de la Muerte uniform

Supreme Director of Chile (self-proclaimed)
- In office 23 March 1817
- Preceded by: Bernardo O'Higgins
- Succeeded by: Bernardo O'Higgins

Personal details
- Born: February 27, 1785 Santiago, Captaincy General of Chile
- Died: May 26, 1818 (aged 33) Tiltil, Chile
- Party: Independent
- Other political affiliations: Affiliated with the Carreristas
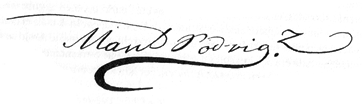
- Signature

Military service
- Battles/wars: Chilean War of Independence; Battle of Maipú

Manuel Xavier Rodríguez Erdoíza (Latin American Spanish: [maˈnwel roˈðɾiɣes]; February 27, 1785 – May 26, 1818) was a Chilean lawyer and guerrilla leader, considered one of the founders of independent Chile. Rodríguez was of Basque descent.

== Early life ==
He was born on 27 February 1785, and was the son of Carlos Rodríguez de Herrera y Zeballos (1760–1822), a customs officer from Spain, and María Loreto de Erdoiza y Aguirre (1755–1822), who was a young lady aristocrat from Peru.

Rodríguez entered the esteemed Carolino College, where he was a classmate of José Miguel Carrera. He went on to study law at the Royal University of San Felipe, and subsequently became a lawyer in 1807.

== The "Patria Vieja" (Old Fatherland) (1810–1814) ==
On 18 September 1810, in the absence of the Spanish monarch, a national government (Primera Junta Nacional de Gobierno) was formed from which the struggle for Chilean Independence sprang.

In May 1811, he was appointed attorney for Santiago de Chile. His attitude towards the independence cause remained moderate until his old friend José Miguel Carrera, a passionate revolutionary, arrived from Spain.

Later in 1811, Rodríguez was elected parliamentary representative for Talca on 4 September, appointed Secretary of War on 15 November and conscripted into the army on 2 December with the rank of captain.

In 1813, the friendship between Rodríguez and Carrera (who by this time had seized control of the Chilean government) had begun to cool. Rodríguez and his brothers were detained and charged with conspiracy against Carrera. They were sentenced to one year's exile on Juan Fernández island; however, Rodríguez was able to procure a document that impeded the completion of this sentence.

Carrera and Rodríguez renewed their friendship in 1814. The government junta presided over by Carrera was replaced by a new one led by Colonel Francisco de la Lastra, criticized profusely by Rodríguez in the Monitor Araucano newspaper. When the Carrera brothers were removed from command, José Miguel was concealed by Rodríguez. After recovering control of the government, Carrera formed a new junta in which Rodríguez was appointed Secretary. However, Spanish forces led by General Mariano Osorio advanced from the south towards Santiago. After the Disaster of Rancagua, the Spanish took back control of Chile and Rodríguez, along with many other patriots, fled to Mendoza, Argentina.

== The Reconquest (1814–1817) ==
Monument of Manuel Rodríquez displayed in Bustamante Park in Santiago, Chile

José de San Martín, Governor of Cuyo, welcomed the Chilean exiles with open arms and organized a "Liberation Army" with Chileans and Argentinians included.

San Martín saw in Rodríguez the ideal spy since he was very shrewd and skilled for this position, and furthermore, his humble origins allowed him to easily pass for a commoner. He began creating disguises and communications systems—often carrying out his duties disguised as a monk, farmer, street merchant, domestic servant or even as a woman.

He was the most-wanted man during the rule of the Spanish Governor of Chile, Casimiro Marcó del Pont. His assaults on Melipilla and San Fernando were an important part of San Martín's strategy to divert attention away from the "Liberating Army" that entered Chile and triumphed at the Battle of Chacabuco.

== The "Patria Nueva" (New Fatherland) (1817–1818) ==
After the victory at Chacabuco, the Chilean commander Bernardo O'Higgins ordered the arrest of Rodríguez who managed to escape capture and was hidden until San Martín was able to intervene on his behalf and conferred on him the rank of lieutenant colonel. After the surprise attack by the Spanish forces at the Second Battle of Cancha Rayada, Rodríguez was instrumental in maintaining calm in Santiago amid false rumors of the death of O'Higgins. It was during this event that he uttered his most famous quote Aún tenemos patria, ciudadanos (We still have a fatherland, citizens).

After the events at Cancha Rayada, Rodríguez and other Carrera supporters organised a regiment called the Hussars of Death (Húsares de la Muerte). The characteristic symbol of this organisation was a white skull over a black background, symbolising their will to die in battle rather than allowing the enemy to win. However, this regiment was not considered for the battle of Maipú and was later dissolved by Bernardo O'Higgins (he and San Martín both opposed the Carrera brothers) .

== Assassination ==
Rodríguez was killed on 26 May 1818 in Til-Til by soldiers of the "Cazadores de los Andes" battalion commanded by Antonio Navarro, after being imprisoned by order of O'Higgins. His execution was extrajudicial, and it is widely attributed to the head of the government.

Rodriguez's body was mutilated and abandoned in a trench, but a group of local peasants found it and recognized Rodríguez, burying him secretly under the La Merced Chapel's altar in Til-Til with the help of the local priest. This was a sample of the affection the people had for Manuel Rodríguez, as well as the fear and contempt for the government of O'Higgins.

By the end of the 20th century, Rodríguez's body was moved to the General Cemetery of Santiago. It is believed today, however (after some research not yet finished), that the moved remains were not really Rodríguez's, but those of an older unknown soldier wearing the Husares de la Muerte uniform (although at the time of his assassination, Rodríguez was not wearing his legendary uniform), and that Rodríguez's body might still be buried in Til-Til's La Merced Chapel.

== In popular culture ==
- In the 2007 historical fiction TV series Héroes, Manuel Rodríguez is played by popular actor Benjamín Vicuña.
- The outlawed Frente Patriótico Manuel Rodríguez (FPMR), was a left-wing guerrilla group that fought against the Augusto Pinochet's military dictatorship during the 80s.
- In the historical movie El Húsar de la Muerte, Manuel Rodríguez is played by Pedro Sienna.
- El Húsar de la Muerte, a theater play by the artistic group La Patogallina, is inspired by the historical movie of the same name by Pedro Sienna.
- Victor Jara dedicated the Song "El Aparecido (Hijo de la Rebeldia)" / "The Appeared (Son of rebellion)" to Manuel Rodriguez
- Patricio Manns dedicated the song "El cautivo del Til Til"/The captive at Til-Til" about the assassination of Manuel Rodriguez.
- Húsar, a 2011 romanticized and dramatized version of the Chilean War of Independence through the eyes of Rodríguez, is a very popular soap opera in Chile.
- 2010: telenovela Manuel Rodríguez (in Chilevisión).

Political offices
| Preceded by Agustín Vial | Secretary of Government; 1811–1812 | Succeeded by Agustín Vial |
| Preceded by Bernardo Vera | Secretary of Government and Finance; 1814 | Succeeded by Miguel Zañartu |
| Preceded by Andrés Nicolás de Orjera | Secretary of War; 1814 | Succeeded by José Ignacio Zenteno |
