= Ramón Luis Irarrázaval =

Chilean politician (1809–1859)

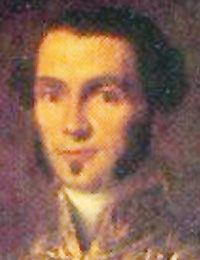

Vice President of Chile
- In office September 11, 1844 – March 5, 1845
- President: Manuel Bulnes Prieto

Minister of the Interior and Foreign Affairs
- In office 1841–1845
- Preceded by: José Miguel Yrarrázaval
- Succeeded by: Manuel Montt
- In office 1838–1840
- Preceded by: Joaquín Tocornal
- Succeeded by: Joaquín Tocornal

Personal details
- Born: September 16, 1809 Santiago, Chile
- Died: October 26, 1859 Lima, Peru
- Education: Instituto Nacional, Royal University of San Felipe

Ramón Luis Irarrázaval Alcalde (September 16, 1809 – October 26, 1859) was a Chilean politician, lawyer and diplomat, who served as a minister in different cabinets, as well as a deputy, ambassador, president of the Supreme Court and Vice President of Chile.

== Biography ==
Irarrázaval was born in Santiago, Chile, the son of Miguel Antonio de Andía-Irarrázaval y del Solar and Carmen Alcalde y Bascuñán. On February 27, 1833, he married Lucia de Vera-Mujica y de la Cuadra, daughter of Bernardo de Vera y Pintado, with whom he had five children.

He studied at the National Institute and graduated as a lawyer from the Royal University of San Felipe on June 9, 1837. He served as a lobbyist for Santiago and an official in the mayor's office and the Ministry of the Interior and the Ministry of Justice.

During the government of José Joaquín Prieto, he twice held the position of Minister of the Interior and Foreign Affairs. He remained in office when Manuel Bulnes Prieto took office, eventually occupying the interim vice presidency of the Republic, from September 11, 1844, to March 5, 1845, due to the president's illness. In 1845 he was replaced by Manuel Montt. That same year he was appointed minister of the Supreme Court.

He was a deputy for different constituencies from 1834 to 1843, president of the Chamber in 1840, president of the Supreme Court (1851–1855) and ambassador to the Holy See (1845–1851).

He was a member of the Review Commission in charge of the Civil Code Project of 1853, appointed by the executive (which began work on June 24, 1853, and concluded in October 1855).

Serving as plenipotentiary minister in Peru, he died in the resort of Chorrillos, south of Lima, in 1859. The cause of his death was a matter of controversy: the judicial ruling of suicide was challenged by the prosecutor in the case, considering that the assault and robbery death investigation was not conducted properly and evidence was ignored. During his stay in Peru he had unsuccessfully tried to mediate a peaceful settlement during the civil war between Ramón Castilla and Manuel Ignacio de Vivanco.
