= National Anthem of Chile =

Himno Nacional de Chile
English: National Anthem of Chile
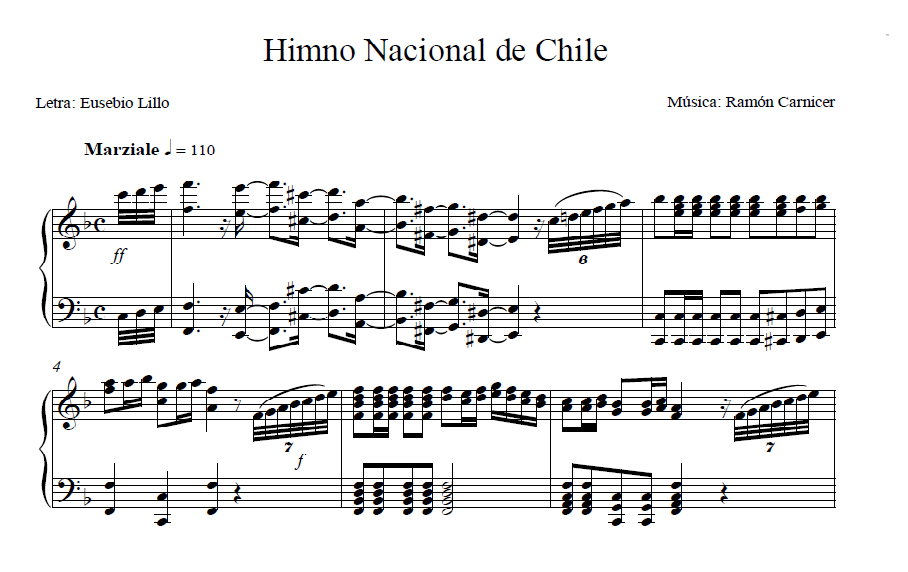
- "National Anthem of Chile" sheet music, opening piano
- National anthem of Chile
- Also known as: La Canción Nacional (English: The National Song) "Puro, Chile, es tu cielo azulado" (English: "Pure, Chile, Is Your Bluish Sky")
- Lyrics: Eusebio Lillo, 20 September 1819 (1st adopted); 17 September 1847 (2nd adopted)
- Music: Ramón Carnicer, 20 August 1820 (1st adopted); 23 December 1828 (2nd adopted)
- Adopted: 23 December 1828
- Preceded by: Canción Nacional Chilena

Audio sample
- Instrumental version: file; help

National Anthem of Chile
- Key: C major, E major, B major,

Official orchestral and vocal recording

The National Anthem of Chile, (Note: Spanish: Himno Nacional de Chile, pronounced [ˈimno nasjoˈnal de ˈtʃile].) also referred to as the "National Song" (Note: Spanish: Canción Nacional, pronounced [kanˈsjon nasjoˈnal].) or by its incipit as "Puro, Chile, es tu cielo azulado" ("Pure, Chile, Is Your Bluish Sky"), was adopted in September 17, 1847. It has a history of two lyrics and two melodies that made up three different versions. The current version was composed by Ramón Carnicer, with words by Eusebio Lillo, with a refrain by the Argentine -Chilean poet Bernardo de Vera, a vestige of the first anthem. It has six parts plus the chorus.

== History ==
=== First national anthem ===
The first Chilean national anthem dates back to 1819, when the government called for, on 13 January, the creation of music and lyrics for this purpose.

The composer Manuel Robles and the poet Bernardo de Vera y Pintado fulfilled this mandate and their "National Song" debuted on 20 August 1820 in the Domingo Arteaga theater, although other historians claim that it was played and sung during the festivities of September 1819.

In the beginning, everyone would stand for the song. The custom of always singing it at the theater slowly disappeared, until it was requested that it only be sung at the anniversary of the country.

The doctor Bernardo Vera, known in the history of the independence, was the author of the verses that were sung to Robles' music.

This first hymn was sung until 1828, when it was replaced with what is currently being sung.

=== Second national anthem ===
The second and current Chilean national anthem was composed by the Spanish composer Ramón Carnicer when he was exiled to England because of his liberal ideas. Chilean Minister in London Mariano Egaña, acting on the criticism that Robles' song received, asked Carnicer to compose a new hymn with Bernardo de Vera's original text.

The Spanish musician had probably written the work by 1827, the date he returned to Barcelona. His hymn debuted at the Arteaga Theater in Santiago on 23 December 1828.

Years later (likely in 1847), the Chilean government entrusted the young poet Eusebio Lillo with a new text that would replace the anti-Spain poem of Vera y Pintado, and after being analyzed by Andrés Bello, retained the original chorus ("Dulce patria, recibe los votos..."). The lyrics were slightly revised in 1909.

During the military dictatorship of Augusto Pinochet, Verse III was officially incorporated because of the dictator's praise of the armed forces and the national police (Carabineros). After the end of Pinochet's regime in 1990, it was only sung at military events. Supporters from the former military junta also sing the anthem with Verse III in private ceremonies and rallies, causing controversy due to a growing general consensus on the crimes against humanity committed by the regime.

During the celebrations marking the 1990 return of democracy at Santiago's Estadio Nacional Julio Martínez Prádanos, the anthem was played in its present form with the melody raised to F Major. This was the original melody of the second anthem by Carnicer, but it used the 1847 lyrics save for the original chorus of the 1819 anthem. This was the version that was played before broadcasts of Chilean presidential addresses from 1991 to 2000. In 2000, it was replaced by a more stylized version that was used until 2010. Afterward, the anthem was omitted from future addresses. Following the end of the dictatorship, television stations rarely used the anthem during sign-on and sign-off, and the practice fell off significantly during the 1990s. Radio stations in Chile continue to play the anthem on New Year's Eve by tradition to start the celebrations.

The anthem has also been translated into Mapudungun, the largest and most commonly spoken indigenous language in Chile, spoken by the Mapuche people.

== Lyrics ==
=== Official lyrics ===
Official instrumental version

Below are the lyrics of the most played version; it corresponds to verse V of the full version and the chorus.

Spanish original

Puro, Chile, es tu cielo azulado.
Puras brisas te cruzan también.
Y tu campo de flores bordado
Es la copia feliz del Edén.
Majestuosa es la blanca montaña
𝄆 Que te dio por baluarte el Señor, 𝄇
𝄆 Y ese mar que tranquilo te baña
Te promete futuro esplendor. 𝄇

Coro:
Dulce Patria, recibe los votos
Con que Chile en tus aras juró:
𝄆 Que o la tumba serás de los libres
O el asilo contra la opresión 𝄇
Que o la tumba serás de los libres
O el asilo contra la opresión
O el asilo contra la opresión
O el asilo contra la opresión.

IPA transcription (Note: See Help:IPA/Spanish, Spanish phonology and Chilean Spanish.)

[ˈpu.ɾo | ˈt͡ʃi.le‿es tu ˈsje.lo‿a.su.ˈla.ðo ǁ]
[ˈpu.ɾaz ˈβɾi.sas te ˈkɾu.san tam.ˈbjen ‖]
[i tu ˈkam.po ðe ˈflo.ɾez βoɾ.ˈða.ðo]
[ez la ˈkop.ja fe.ˈliz ðel e.ˈðen ‖]
[ma.xes.ˈtuo̯.sa‿ez la ˈβlaŋ.ka mon.ˈta.ɲa]
𝄆 [ke te ðjo poɾ βa.ˈlwaɾ.te‿el se.ˈɲoɾ |] 𝄇
𝄆 [ˈi(‿)e.se maɾ ke tɾaŋ.ˈki.lo te ˈβa.ɲa]
[te pɾo.ˈme.te fu.ˈtu.ɾo‿es.plen.ˈdoɾ ǁ] 𝄇

[ˈko.ɾo]
[ˈdul.se ˈpa.tɾja | re.ˈsi.βe loz ˈβo.tos]
[koŋ ke ˈt͡ʃi.le‿en tus ˈa.ɾas xu.ˈɾo |]
𝄆 [ke‿o la ˈtum.ba se.ˈɾaz ðe loz ˈliβ.ɾes]
[o‿el a.ˈsi.lo ˈkon.tɾa la o.pɾe.ˈsjon] 𝄇
[ke‿o la ˈtum.ba se.ˈɾaz ðe loz ˈliβ.ɾes]
[o‿el a.ˈsi.lo ˈkon.tɾa la o.pɾe.ˈsjon]
[o‿el a.ˈsi.lo ˈkon.tɾa la o.pɾe.ˈsjon]
[o‿el a.ˈsi.lo ˈkon.tɾa la o.pɾe.ˈsjon ‖]

English translation

Pure, Chile, is your bluish sky
Pure breezes cross you as well
And your flower-embroidered fields
Are the happy copy of Eden
Majestic are the white mountains
𝄆 That the Lord gave you as a bastion 𝄇
𝄆 And the sea that tranquilly bathes you
Promises you a future splendor. 𝄇

Chorus:
Sweet fatherland, receive the vows
That Chile gave you on your altars
𝄆 That you be either the tomb of the free
Or a refuge against oppression 𝄇
That you be either the tomb of the free
Or a refuge against oppression
Or a refuge against oppression
Or a refuge against oppression.

=== Full lyrics ===
According to Chilean Constitution [decree 260], only the fifth verse and the chorus are played officially as the National Anthem.

Spanish original

Coro:
Dulce Patria, recibe los votos
con que Chile en tus aras juró
𝄆 que o la tumba serás de los libres
o el asilo contra la opresión. 𝄇
que o la tumba serás de los libres
o el asilo contra la opresión
o el asilo contra la opresión
o el asilo contra la opresión.

I
Ha cesado la lucha sangrienta;
ya es hermano el que ayer invasor;
de tres siglos lavamos la afrenta
combatiendo en el campo de honor.
El que ayer doblegábase esclavo
𝄆 libre al fin y triunfante se ve; 𝄇
𝄆 libertad es la herencia del bravo,
la Victoria se humilla a su pie 𝄇.

II
Alza, Chile, sin mancha la frente;
conquistaste tu nombre en la lid;
siempre noble, constante y valiente
te encontraron los hijos del Cid.
Que tus libres tranquilos coronen
𝄆 a las artes, la industria y la paz, 𝄇
𝄆 y de triunfos cantares entonen
que amedrenten al déspota audaz 𝄇.

III
Vuestros nombres, valientes soldados,
que habéis sido de Chile el sostén,
nuestros pechos los llevan grabados;
los sabrán nuestros hijos también.
Sean ellos el grito de muerte
𝄆 que lancemos marchando a lidiar, 𝄇
𝄆 y sonando en la boca del fuerte
hagan siempre al tirano temblar 𝄇.

IV
Si pretende el cañón extranjero
nuestros pueblos, osado, invadir;
desnudemos al punto el acero
y sepamos vencer o morir.
Con su sangre el altivo araucano
𝄆 nos legó, por herencia, el valor; 𝄇
𝄆 y no tiembla la espada en la mano
defendiendo, de Chile, el honor 𝄇.

V (verso oficial)
Puro, Chile, es tu cielo azulado,
puras brisas te cruzan también,
y tu campo de flores bordado
es la copia feliz del Edén.
Majestuosa es la blanca montaña
𝄆 Que te dio por baluarte el Señor, 𝄇
𝄆 Y ese mar que tranquilo te baña
Te promete un futuro esplendor 𝄇.

VI
Esas galas, ¡oh, Patria!, esas flores
que tapizan tu suelo feraz,
no las pisen jamás invasores;
con tu sombra las cubra la paz.
Nuestros pechos serán tu baluarte,
𝄆 con tu nombre sabremos vencer, 𝄇
𝄆 o tu noble, glorioso estandarte,
nos verá, combatiendo, caer 𝄇.

English translation

Chorus:
Sweet Homeland, receive the vows
That Chile gave you on your altars
𝄆 That you be either the tomb of the free
Or a refuge from oppression 𝄇
That you be either the tomb of the free
Or a refuge from oppression
Or a refuge from oppression
Or a refuge from oppression

I
The bloody fight has ceased;
and yesterday's invader is now our brother;
three centuries we washed the affront
fighting in the field of honor.
That who yesterday was a slave
𝄆 is free and triumphant today; 𝄇
𝄆 freedom is the heritage of the brave,
Victory lies shameful to his feet 𝄇.

II
Rise, Chile, with a spotless forehead;
you conquered your name on the fight;
always noble, constant and courageous
the children of El Cid found you.
May your free calmly crown
𝄆 the arts, industry and peace, 𝄇
𝄆 and may they sing songs of your triumph
to intimidate the daring despot 𝄇.

III
Your names, brave soldiers
who have been Chile's mainstay,
they are engraved in our chests;
our children will know them as well.
May they be the death cry
𝄆 that comes out when we march to the fight, 𝄇
𝄆 and ringing in the mouth of the strong
they always make the tyrant tremble 𝄇.

IV
If the foreign cannon intends
to invade, daring, our people;
let's draw our arms
and know victory or death.
With its blood the proud Mapuches
𝄆 inherited its courage to us; 𝄇
𝄆 and the sword doesn't tremble in the hand
of that who defends the honor of Chile 𝄇.

V (official verse)
Pure, Chile, is your bluish sky
Pure breezes cross you as well
And your flower-embroidered fields
Are the happy copy of Eden
Majestic are the white mountains
𝄆 That the Lord gave you as a bastion 𝄇
𝄆 And that sea that tranquilly bathes your shore
Promises you a future splendor 𝄇.

VI
That pride, oh, Homeland!, those flowers
growing on your fertile soil,
may they never be stepped on by invaders;
may your shadow cover them with peace.
Our chests will be your bastion
𝄆 in your name we will know how to win, 𝄇
𝄆 or your noble, glorious emblem
will see us fall in the fight 𝄇.

=== 1973–1990 lyrics ===
The following lyrics were used during the military regime in the country. Both the 5th and 3rd verses were used.

Spanish original

I
Puro, Chile, es tu cielo azulado.
Puras brisas te cruzan también.
Y tu campo de flores bordado
Es la copia feliz del Edén.
Majestuosa es la blanca montaña
𝄆 Que te dio por baluarte el Señor, 𝄇
𝄆 Y ese mar que tranquilo te baña
Te promete un futuro esplendor 𝄇.

Coro:
Dulce Patria, recibe los votos
Con que Chile en tus aras juró:
𝄆 Que o la tumba serás de los libres
O el asilo contra la opresión 𝄇
Que o la tumba serás de los libres
O el asilo contra la opresión
O el asilo contra la opresión
O el asilo contra la opresión.

II
Vuestros nombres, valientes soldados,
que habéis sido de Chile el sostén,
nuestros pechos los llevan grabados;
los sabrán nuestros hijos también.
Sean ellos el grito de muerte
𝄆 que lancemos marchando a lidiar, 𝄇
𝄆 y sonando en la boca del fuerte
hagan siempre al tirano temblar. 𝄇

Coro

English translation

I
Pure, Chile, is your bluish sky
Pure breezes cross you as well
And your flower-embroidered fields
Are the happy copy of Eden
Majestic are the white mountains
𝄆 That the Lord gave you as a bastion 𝄇
𝄆 And that sea that tranquilly bathes your shore
Promises you a future splendor. 𝄇

Chorus:
Sweet Fatherland receive the vows
With which Chile swore at your altars
𝄆 Either the tomb of the free you will be
Or the refuge against oppression 𝄇
Either the tomb of the free you will be
Or the refuge against oppression
Or the refuge against oppression
Or the refuge against oppression.

II
Your names, brave soldiers
who have been Chile's mainstay,
they are engraved in our chests;
our children will know them as well.
May they be the death cry
𝄆 that comes out when we march to the fight, 𝄇
𝄆 and ringing in the mouth of the strong
they always make the tyrant tremble. 𝄇

Chorus
