= Church of Saint Philip Neri =

Church in Barcelona, Catalonia, Spain

Coordinates: 41.3836°N 2.1746°E

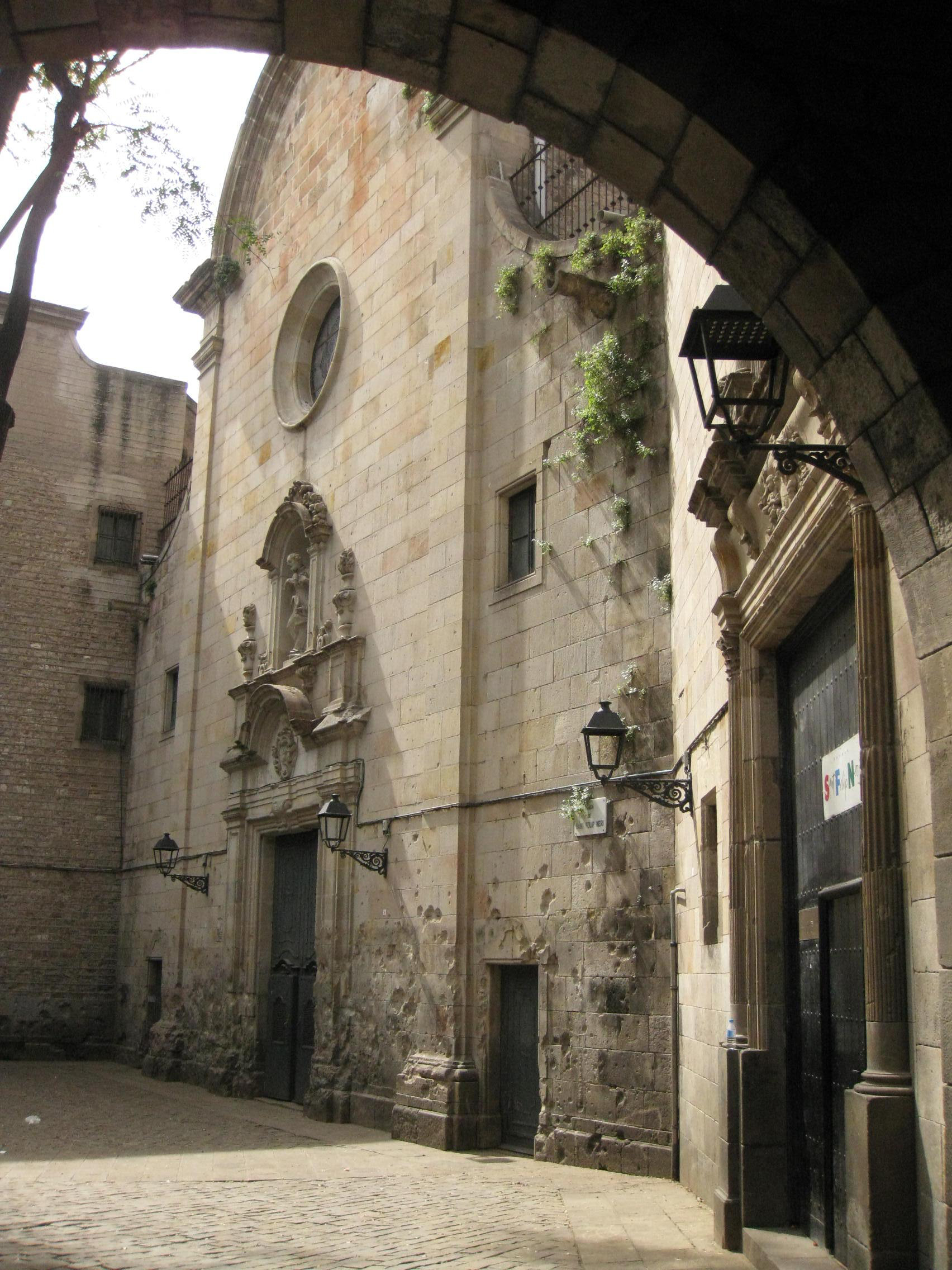
The Church of Saint Philip Neri

The Church of Saint Philip Neri (Catalan: Església de Sant Felip Neri) is a baroque-style church located in the Plaça de Sant Felip Neri, in the Gothic quarter of Barcelona, Catalonia, Spain. It was built between 1721 and 1752. During the Spanish Civil War, on January 30, 1938, it was bombarded by Franco's air forces (the effects of the explosion can be seen on the facade). The church has a convent annex belonging to the Oratory of Saint Philip Neri.

The composer Francesc Queralt produced a number of oratorios for performance at the church.
