= Bernardo de Vera y Pintado =

Argentine-Chilean lawyer and politician

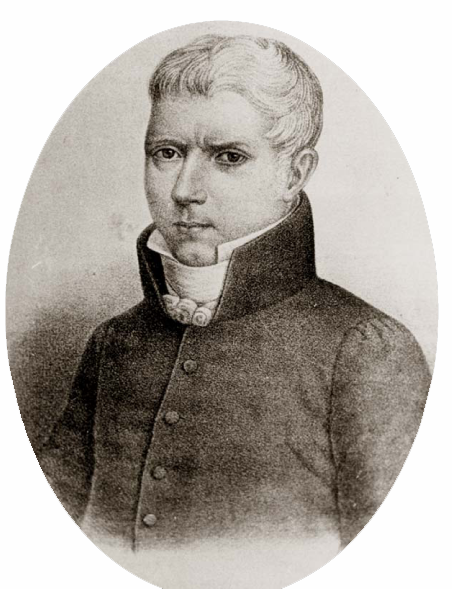

Senator of the Republic of Chile
- In office 1823–1825

Minister of Ministry of National Defense
- In office September 13, 1814 – October 9, 1814

Personal details
- Born: 1780 Santa Fe, Argentina
- Died: August 27, 1827 (aged 46–47) Santiago, Chile
- Children: Ramón Luis Irarrázaval
- Education: Royal University of San Felipe
- Occupation: Lawyer and politician

Bernardo de Vera y Pintado (1780, Santa Fe, Argentina – August 27, 1827, Santiago, Chile), was an Argentine-Chilean lawyer and politician. He was the author of the lyrics of both the Hymn to the Victory of Yerbas Buenas (1813) and the first National Anthem of Chile (1819).

== Biography ==
He completed his higher studies at the University of Córdoba. Due to the fact that Córdoba did not offer a law degree, in 1799 he moved to Chile accompanying Governor Joaquín del Pino, future viceroy of the Río de la Plata, who was married to his paternal aunt Rafaela de Vera Mujica y López Pintado.

He studied law and theology at the Royal University of San Felipe, obtaining the degrees of bachelor, bachelor and doctor in the second in 1799, and the doctorate in law in 1806. He was a professor of law at that University.

=== Political career ===
In 1808 he was already a revolutionary and his position as secretary of the town council of Santiago de Chile gave him an important political position.

On May 18, 1810, he was accused of subversion before Francisco Antonio García Carrasco (governor of Chile) he was arrested on May 25, 1810, alongside Juan Antonio Ovalle and José Antonio de Rojas. He was taken to the San Pedro barracks, and later on to Valparaíso, on the 29th, where he was forced to board the frigate "Astrea".

When the events in Santiago became known, there was a strong popular commotion that frightened the governor. José Ignacio de la Cuadra, Bernardo Vera's father-in-law, presented a petition signed by forty "respectable neighbors" in which he asked the Cabildo to comply with the laws. In spite of having offered the opportunity to the prisoners to defend themselves publicly, they were deported to Callao. Due to their poor health, they were left in Valparaíso. After the formation of the First National Government Junta of Chile, the Argentine government appointed him diplomatic representative in Chile.

He collaborated with Camilo Henríquez in the writing of the newspaper Aurora de Chile, published for the first time on February 13, 1812. He was secretary of the government in Finance (July 1814) and War (September 1814).

Due to the patriot defeat in Rancagua, he emigrated to Mendoza, joining the council of that city. When Deputy Tomás Godoy Cruz informed him that the Congress of Tucumán was considering the establishment of a monarchy for the United Provinces of the Río de la Plata, he obtained from the council a prohibition to support those efforts.

He returned to Chile with the Army of the Andes in 1817, after the victory of the independence fighters in the Battle of Chacabuco.

In 1819 he composed the first National Anthem of Chile, whose chorus was preserved in the current one. He was part of the Congress as deputy for Linares (1823–1825). He was vice-president of the Congress (1824) and President of the Congress in 1825. In 1826 he was appointed professor of Civil and Canon Law at the National Institute.

=== Family ===
On March 16, 1808, he married Mercedes de la Cuadra y Baeza from Santiago, with whom he had two daughters: Lucía, married in 1833 to Ramón Luis Irarrázaval, and María del Carmen de Vera-Mujica y de la Cuadra.

== Bibliography ==
- Castillo Infante, Fernando; Lía Cortés y Jordi Fuentes (1996). Diccionario Histórico y Biográfico de Chile, 12.ª edición. Santiago de Chile: Editorial Zig-Zag.
- Campos Harriet, Fernando (1999). Historia Constitucional de Chile: Instituciones Políticas y Sociales, 7th edition. Santiago de Chile: Editorial Jurídica de Chile.
