= Hussars of Death =

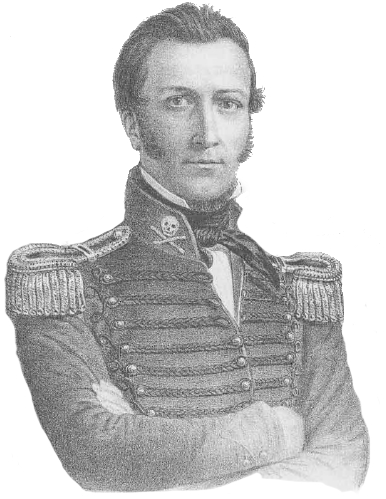
Manuel Rodríguez depicted in his "Hussars of Death" uniform.

The Hussars of Death (Spanish: Húsares de la Muerte) were a paramilitary group founded by Chilean guerrilla Manuel Rodríguez Erdoíza after the Second Battle of Cancha Rayada, on March 23, 1818.

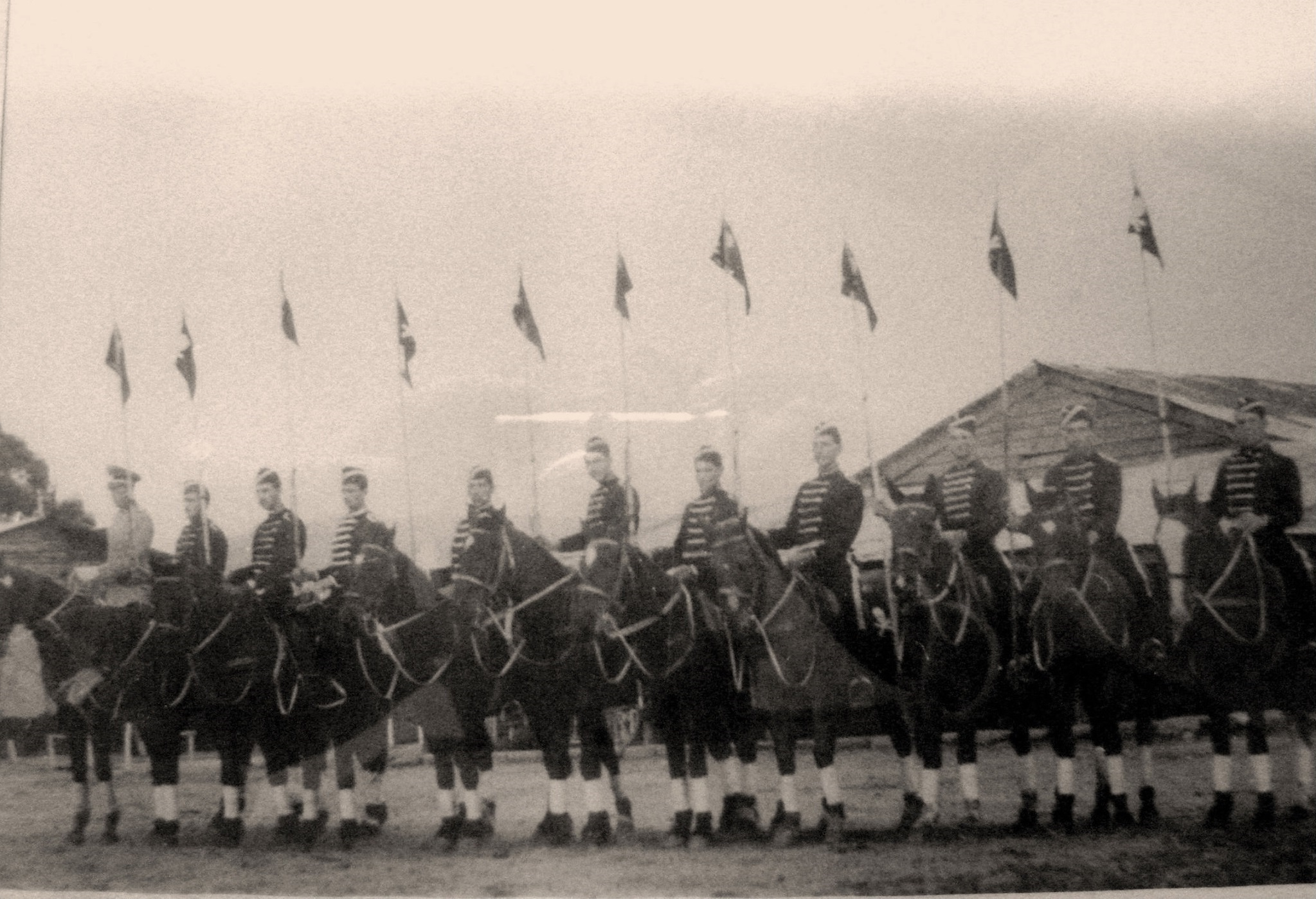
Hussars of Death.

Their uniform was near identical to Hussars of Galicia's, but in black, with a skull over two femurs on the collar. Manuel Rodríguez had already used a captain uniform when he was part of the Hussars of the Great National Guard in their 1813 campaign in Southern Chile; his friend José Miguel Carrera pushed him to use its likeness for the new group.

== Military action ==
The news of the Battle of Cancha Rayada caused great consternation and fear in the inhabitants of Santiago, all of whom were thinking of a new emigration to Mendoza. In those critical circumstances, the popular guerrilla Manuel Rodríguez appeared, and by shouting 'We still have a homeland, citizens!' the courage returned to those who believed everything was lost, and he was appointed Supreme Director.

The Chilean people associated him with the government of the Delegate Board chaired by Luis de la Cruz, and in a few hours Rodríguez organised and armed a regiment that he called Hussars of Death, meaning that they preferred to die before giving victory to the enemy. He encouraged the people and gave weapons to the volunteers who showed up to build the defence of Santiago. It is the guerrilla who dominates the situation and prepares the capital to resist the royalists, agitating the people and organising an extraordinary mobilisation. The rumour of O'Higgins' death in the Battle of Cancha Rayada ran everywhere, and the people saw as the only leader Manuel Rodríguez, the Warlord of the Reconquest, who now wore his elegant black Hussar uniform and was accompanied by many of his followers and friends.

At that time the Hussars of Death took great prominence and adorned the streets of Santiago with courage, vigour and patriotism, their skulls came to life and the people were ready and determined to defend the independence of Chile.

Thirty hours after Manuel took office as Supreme Director, the Supreme Director Bernardo O'Higgins suddenly appeared badly wounded at the Government Palace. Finding Manuel Rodríguez and the Hussars of Death in command of the country, he talks with Rodríguez, who hands over command and presents the Hussars of Death as a new military group ready to fight and defend the capital that in a few days or so would have the royalists in its streets, but O'Higgins does not like the idea of Rodríguez's men defending the city. Crippled after Cancha Rayada, O'Higgins delegated command of the patriotic troops to San Martín. He gathered them in the plains of Maipú, on the outskirts of Santiago. In the Battle of Maipú, fought on 5 April 1818, José de San Martín inflicted a hard defeat on Osorio, who chose to return to Concepción; the royalists would no longer attempt another incursion into Santiago, thereby ensuring independence.

== Group dissolution ==
According to José Zapiola Cortés in his book Memories of 30 Years, Manuel Rodríguez before the Battle of Maipú, spoke with the members of the Hussars of Death, and they reached an agreement not to appear in battle and wait in Santiago, after that episode and after the Battle of Maipú on 5 April 1818 (14 days after its start), the squad was dissolved, since they did not want to participate in said battle as an act of contempt and protest against O'Higgins. More recent versions discredit Zapiola's hypothesis, highlighting the conflict that still existed between O'Higgins and Carrera, it is for this reason that O'Higgins prevented every Carrerino officer including the Hussars of Death squad from participating in the final battle for the independence of Chile.

However, in the Chilean Army's records, and in works by historians such as Miguel D. Amunategui and Benjamín Vicuña Mackenna, it is made clear that the Hussars of Death battalion was kept at the rearguard by Bernardo O'Higgins' decision, and it captured 700 royalists under the command of the patriot deserter Ángel Calvo, in a cavalry charge that ran over with these forces on the Niebla hill where they had taken refuge.

== See also ==
- Hussar
- Manuel Rodríguez Erdoíza
- Hussards de la Mort (France)
