= Francesc Queralt =

Catalan composer (1740–1825)

Francesc (sometimes Francisco) Queralt (1740 - 28 February 1825) was a Spanish composer, long active in Barcelona.

A native of Les Borges Blanques, Queralt was for many years the maestro di capilla of Barcelona Cathedral. Greatly respected as a teacher, he counted among his pupils Baltasar Saldoni, Ramón Carnicer, and Mateu Ferrer. As a composer he worked exclusively in religious forms, producing four masses and numerous responsories, motets, and other such works. He composed numerous oratorios in an Italianate style, many of them for performance at the Church of Saint Philip Neri in Barcelona. These include:

- Daniel en Babilonia
- El juicio de Salomón
- La casta Susanna
- La conversión de Agustino
- La arca del testamento

The scores of nineteen of these survive, along with the librettos of 45. Numerous of Queralt's manuscripts are held by the Library of Catalonia, as are some 18th-century editions of his music. Queralt died in Barcelona.
