= 1989 in Chile =

- Decades: 1960s; 1970s; 1980s; 1990s; 2000s
- See also: Other events of 1989; Timeline of Chilean history

The following lists events that happened during 1989 in Chile.

== Incumbents ==
- President of Chile: Augusto Pinochet

== Events ==
- 1989 – 1989 Chilean grape scare

=== June ===
- 30 June – Chilean constitutional referendum, 1989

=== August ===
- 17 August - Chilean constitution significantly amended

=== December ===
- 14 December – Chilean general election, 1989

== Births ==
- 9 January – Matías Celis
- 11 January – Carlos Escudero
- 9 March – Ariel Salinas
- 8 April – Cristián Garay
- 17 April – Charles Aránguiz
- 27 July – David Llanos
- 5 August – Adrián Faúndez
- 19 August – Orlando Gutiérrez (Chilean footballer)
- 19 September – Lorenza Izzo

== Deaths ==
- 26 August – Andrés Sabella (b. 1912)
