= 2001 in Chile =

- Decades: 1980s; 1990s; 2000s; 2010s; 2020s
- See also: Other events of 2001; Timeline of Chilean history

The following lists events that happened during 2001 in Chile.

== Incumbents ==
- President of Chile: Ricardo Lagos

== Events ==
=== December ===
- 16 December – Chilean parliamentary election, 2001

== Deaths ==
- 2 January – Santos Chavez (b. 1934)
- 28 May – Francisco Varela (b. 1946)
- 8 December – Augusto Barcia (b. 1926)
