= 1808 in Chile =

- Decades: 1780s; 1790s; 1800s; 1810s; 1820s
- See also: Other events in 1808 · Timeline of Chilean history

The following lists events that happened during 1808 in Chile.

== Incumbents ==
Royal Governor of Chile: Luis Muñoz de Guzmán (-11 February), Francisco Antonio García Carrasco (February-).

== Births ==
18 July - Buenaventura Cousiño Jorquera, member of Chilean parliament (d. 1855).

== Deaths ==
11 February - Luis Muñoz de Guzmán, Royal Governor of Chile (b. 1735).
