= 1805 in Chile =

- Decades: 1780s; 1790s; 1800s; 1810s; 1820s
- See also: Other events in 1805 · Timeline of Chilean history

The following Lists events that happened during 1805 in Chile.

== Incumbent ==
Royal Governor of Chile: Luis Muñoz de Guzmán

== Births ==
1805 - Juan de la Cruz Donoso, politician and journalist (d. 1859) 21 February - Pedro Félix Vicuña, journalist (d. 1874)
