= Marta Brunet =

Chilean writer (1897–1967)

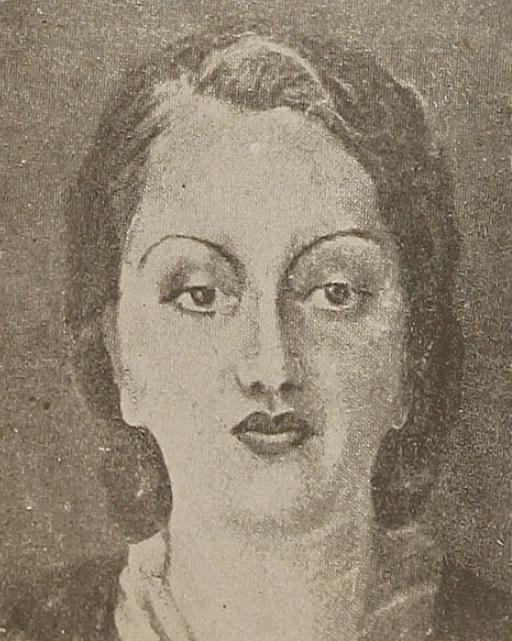
- 1943 portrait of Brunet
- Born: August 9, 1897; Chillán, Chile
- Died: October 27, 1967 (aged 70); Montevideo
- Occupation: Writer

Marta Brunet (August 9, 1897 – October 27, 1967), was a Chilean writer. She was a recipient of the National Prize for Literature.

== Life and work ==
Born August 9, 1897 in Chillán, she was the only child of Ambrosio Brunet Molina and his Spanish wife María Presentación Cáraves de Colosia. Her mother was a disabled person which led to Marta Brunet being largely taught at home by tutors. In her teen years she traveled to Europe with her parents and became influenced by the authors there. In 1923, her first novel appeared and was noted for its realistic portrayal of country life. By 1929, she lived in Santiago and had won a literary prize for a short story. Her writings began to involve urban life more after this and her 1946 work Humo hacia el sur [Smoke on the Southern shore], involving urban society, would be one of her most noted. Later she became second secretary to the Chilean embassy, but was asked to resign by the government of Carlos Ibáñez del Campo In her career as a writer, she was the recipient of various awards including the National Literary Award in 1961.

=== Diplomatic Career ===
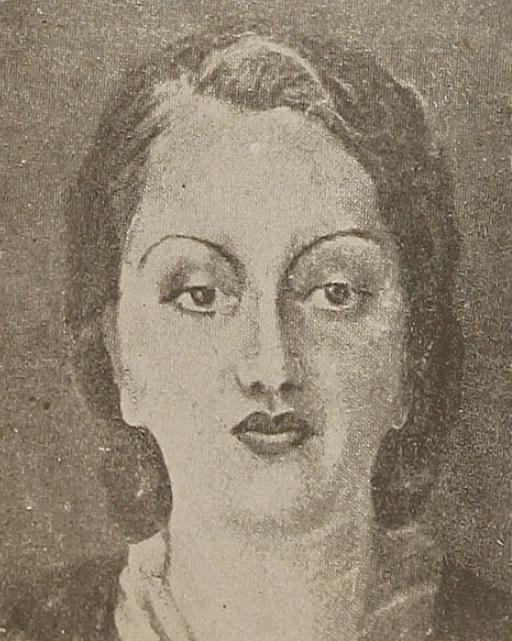
Oil painting of Marta Brunet in 1943, created by María Tupper

Following the 1939 Chillán earthquake, President Pedro Aguirre Cerda appointed her as honorary consul in La Plata, which did not prevent her from continuing her work as a writer. In 1943, her collection of short stories, Aguas Abajo, was published, for which she received the Atenea Prize, awarded by the University of Concepción. Later, President Juan Antonio Ríos appointed her as a career consul attached to the Consulate General of Chile in Buenos Aires, a position she held until 1952. However, the next president, Gabriel González Videla, appointed her as secretary at the Chilean Embassy in Buenos Aires.

During her diplomatic service, she sent books to the library of the Girls' High School (Liceo de Niñas) in Chillán. In 1960, she underwent surgery in Spain, where she was staying when she was awarded the National Prize for Literature in 1961, unanimously by the jury. This made her the second woman to receive this award, after Gabriela Mistral.

On June 7, 1962, she was declared an Illustrious Daughter of Chillán, and that same year, she taught a course on Latin American writers at the Girls' High School in that city. This would be the last time she engaged in activities in her hometown. In October 1963, she was appointed Cultural Attaché at the Chilean Embassy in Brazil. In December of the same year, she was named Cultural Attaché at the Chilean Embassy in Uruguay, where she was also inducted into the National Academy of Letters of Uruguay.

== Tributes and Legacy ==
In 1972, the Girls' High School (Liceo de Niñas) in the city of Chillán changed its name to Liceo Marta Brunet. It was not until 2011 that the Ministry of Education recognized the educational institution as a high school of excellence, renaming it Liceo Bicentenario Marta Brunet. Other schools bearing the writer's name are located in Los Ángeles, Colbún, Punta de Cortés in Rancagua, and Macul.

Regarding neighborhoods, the Barrio Marta Brunet in the commune of Puente Alto, located in the Bajos de Mena sector on the outskirts of Santiago de Chile, can be mentioned. This area was the scene of the Murder of Hans Pozo in 2006.

In 2017, Pablo Concha Ferreccio donated to the University of Chile the only surviving autograph manuscript of the novel Montaña Adentro, which had remained in the hands of his grandfather, the philologist and University of Chile professor Mario Ferreccio Podestá, for nearly twenty years.

== Works ==
- Montaña adentro, 1923.
- Bestia dañina, 1926.
- María Rosa, flor de Quillén, 1927.
- Bienvenido, 1929.
- Reloj de sol, 1930.
- Cuentos para Marisol, 1938.
- Aguas abajo, 1943.
- Humo hacia el sur, 1946.
- La mampara, 1946.
- Raíz del seño, 1949.
- María Nadie, 1957.
- Aleluyas para los más chiquititos, 1960.
- Amasijo, 1962.
- Obras completas, 1962.
- Soledad de la sangre, 1967.
- Piedra Callada, 1946
