= 2006 in Chile =

- Decades: 1980s; 1990s; 2000s; 2010s; 2020s
- See also: Other events of 2006; Timeline of Chilean history

The following lists events that happened during 2006 in Chile.

== Incumbents ==
- President of Chile: Ricardo Lagos (until 11 March), Michelle Bachelet (starting 11 March)

== Events ==
=== January ===
- 15 January – A runoff is held for the 2005–06 Chilean presidential election.
- 20 January – 2006 Copiapó mining accident

=== March ===
- 27 March – A human foot was discovered on a public street in Puente Alto alerting authorities to the murder of Hans Pozo.

=== May ===
- 30 May – 790,000 students protest across the country in the 2006 student protests in Chile.

=== December ===
- 28 December – Pension Reserve Fund of Chile is established.

== Deaths ==
- 13 June – Stella Díaz Varín (born 1926)
- 14 August – Rubén Marcos (born 1942)
- 10 November – Gabriel Donoso (born 1960)
- 25 November – Leocán Portus (born 1923)
- 10 December – Augusto Pinochet (born 1915)
