= 1991 in Chile =

- Decades: 1970s; 1980s; 1990s; 2000s; 2010s
- See also: Other events of 1991; Timeline of Chilean history

The following lists events that happened during 1991 in Chile.

== Incumbents ==
- President of Chile: Patricio Aylwin

== Events ==
=== February ===
- February – The Rettig Report is released.

=== November ===
- November 29 & 30 – The 10th Chilean telethon takes place.

== Sport ==
- Chile at the 1991 Pan American Games
- 1991 Copa América
- 1991 Copa Chile
- 1991 Copa Libertadores Finals
- 1991 Intercontinental Cup
- Chile national football team 1991

== Births ==
- 3 February – Julio Álamos
- 26 March – Cristian Magaña
- 8 May – Matías Blásquez
- 8 June – Felipe Araya

== Deaths ==
- 9 June – Claudio Arrau, pianist (b. 1903)
- 11 June – Julieta Campusano (b. 1918)
