= 1810 in Chile =

- Decades: 1790s; 1800s; 1810s; 1820s; 1830s
- See also: Other events in 1810 · Timeline of Chilean history

The following lists events that happened during 1810 in Chile.

== Incumbents ==
Royal Governor of Chile: Francisco Antonio García Carrasco(-July 16), Mateo de Toro Zambrano (July 16-September 18)

== Events ==
=== July ===
- 16 July - Governor Francisco Antonio García Carrasco is forced to resign.

=== September ===
- 18 September - The Government Junta of Chile (1810) is established.

== Births ==
- 23 February - Matías Cousiño (d. 1863)
- Unknown - Candelaria Pérez (d. 1870)

== Deaths ==
18 December - Nicolasa Valdés (b. 1733)
