= 1811 in Chile =

- Decades: 1790s; 1800s; 1810s; 1820s; 1830s
- See also: Other events in 1811 · Timeline of Chilean history

The following lists events that happened during 1811 in Chile.

== Incumbents ==
President of the First Government Junta of Chile (1810): Mateo de Toro Zambrano (-February 26, Juan Martínez de Rozas (February 26-April 2), Fernando Márquez de la Plata (April 2-July 4)

President of the First National Congress: Juan Antonio Ovalle (July 4–20), Moderate, Martin Calvo Encalada (July 20-August 11)

President of the Provisional Executive Authority: Martín Calvo Encalad, (20 July-4 September), Patriot

President of the Executive Court: Juan Enrique Rosales (4 September–November 16)

President of the Provisional Government Junta: José Miguel Carrera (16 November–December 13), Patriot

Supreme Provisional Authority: José Miguel Carrera (December 13-), Patriot

== Events ==
=== April ===
- 1 April - The Figueroa mutiny, a failed attempt to restore royalism, occurs.

=== July ===
- 4 July - The National Congress of Chile is established.

== Births ==
- Date unknown - José Manuel Eguiguren Urrejola (d. 1883)

== Deaths ==
- 26 February - Mateo de Toro Zambrano (b. 1727)
- 8 April - José Antonio Martínez de Aldunate (b. 1731)
