= 1801 in Chile =

- Decades: 1780s; 1790s; 1800s; 1810s; 1820s
- See also: Other events in 1801 · Timeline of Chilean history

The following lists events that happened during 1801 in Chile.

== Incumbents ==
Royal Governors - Joaquín del Pino (-March 31), José de Santiago Concha Jiménez Lobatón (April 1-December), Francisco Tadeo Diez de Medina Vidanges (December-)

== Events ==
=== January ===
- January 1 – a large earthquake strongly affected the city of La Serena and surrounding areas, causing considerable structural damage.

== Births ==
May 6 - José Joaquín Pérez, seventh president of Chile. (d. 1889)
