= 1803 in Chile =

- Decades: 1780s; 1790s; 1800s; 1810s; 1820s
- See also: Other events in 1803 · Timeline of Chilean history

The following lists events that happened during 1803 in Chile.

== Incumbents ==
- Royal Governor of Chile: Luis Muñoz de Guzmán

== Events ==
=== March ===
March 3–5: The Parliament of Negrete convenes. It is considered the last great parliament of the colonial period in Chile.
