= 1806 in Chile =

- Decades: 1780s; 1790s; 1800s; 1810s; 1820s
- See also: Other events in 1806 · Timeline of Chilean history

The following lists events that happened during 1806 in Chile.

== Incumbent ==
Royal Governor of Chile: Luis Muñoz de Guzmán
