= 2000 in Chile =

- Decades: 1980s; 1990s; 2000s; 2010s; 2020s
- See also: Other events of 2000; Timeline of Chilean history

The following lists events that happened during 2000 in Chile.

== Incumbents ==
- President of Chile: Eduardo Frei Ruiz-Tagle (until 11 March), Ricardo Lagos (starting 11 March)

== Events ==
=== January ===
- 16 January – Runoff elections are held.

== Deaths ==
- 27 January – Óscar Olavarría (b. 1951)
- 30 April – Raúl Rettig (b. 1909)
- 14 July – Pepo (cartoonist) (b. 1911)
- 12 August – Luis Miqueles Caridi (b. 1911)
