= 2005 in Chile =

- Decades: 1980s; 1990s; 2000s; 2010s; 2020s
- See also: Other events of 2005; Timeline of Chilean history

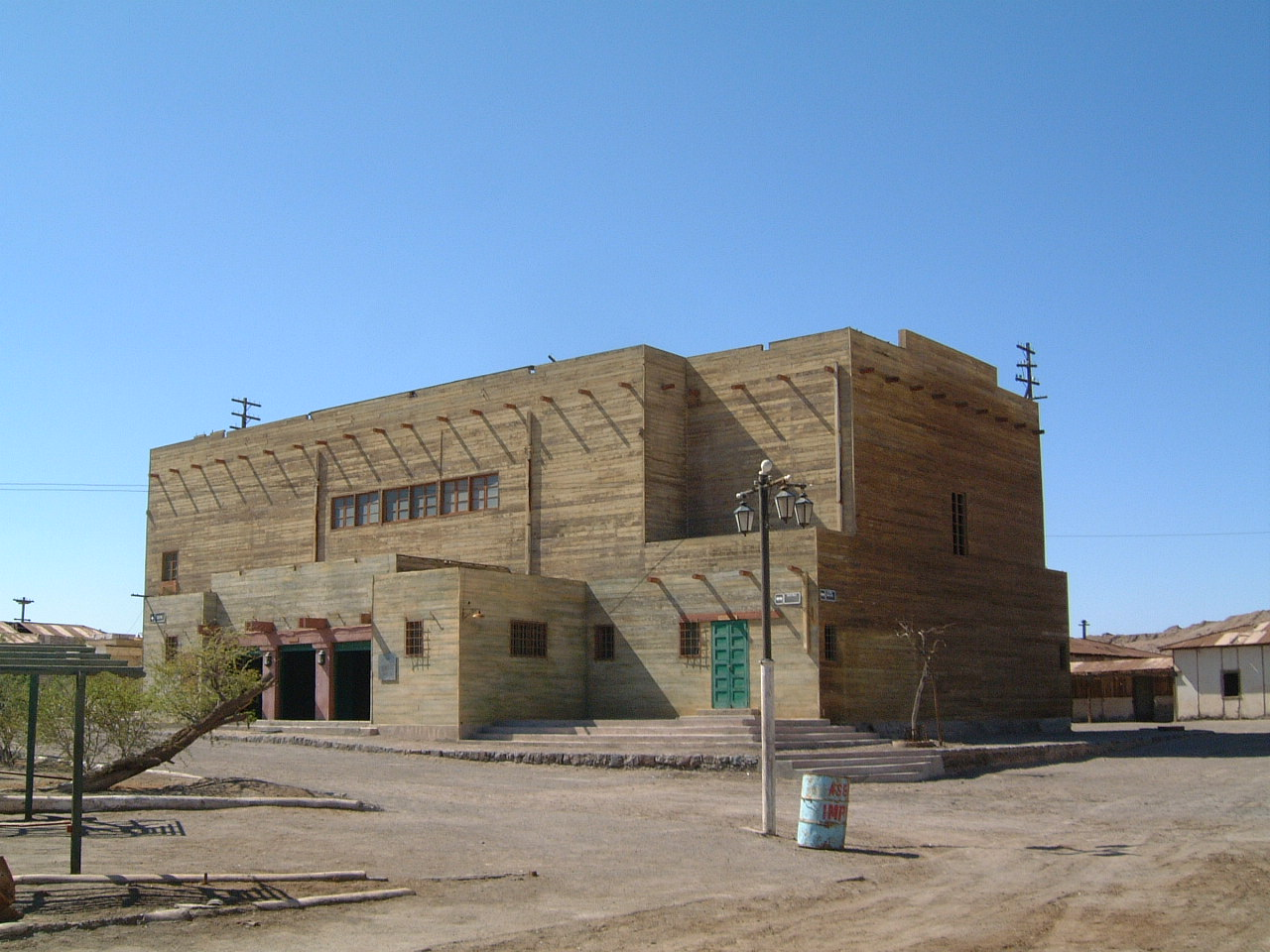

The following lists events that happened during 2005 in Chile.

== Incumbents ==
- President of Chile: Ricardo Lagos

== Events ==
=== May ===
- 18 May – Tragedy of Antuco

=== June ===
- 13 June - 2005 Tarapacá earthquake, the epicentre of which was in Mamiña

=== November ===
- Alberto Fujimori's arrest in Santiago

=== December ===
- 11 December
  - Chilean parliamentary election, 2005
  - 2005–06 Chilean presidential election

== Deaths ==
- 3 January – Misael Escuti (b. 1926)
- 6 March – Gladys Marín (b. 1938)
- 18 August – Andrónico Luksic Abaroa (b. 1926)
- 29 October – Fernando Alegría (b. 1918)
