= 1939 in Chile =

- Decades: 1910s; 1920s; 1930s; 1940s; 1950s
- See also: Other events of 1939; Timeline of Chilean history

The following lists events that happened during 1939 in Chile.

== Incumbents ==
- President of Chile: Pedro Aguirre Cerda

== Events ==
=== August ===
- 25 August – The Ariostazo failed coup attempt occurs.

== Births ==
- 10 January – Jorge Toro
- 9 April – Hugo Villanueva
- 26 May – Alejandro Foxley
- 21 June – Luisa Toledo, human rights activist and mother of the Vergara Toledo brothers (died 2021)
- 22 June – Luis Eyzaguirre
- 8 December – Humberto Cruz
- 25 December – Claudio Huepe (died 2009)

== Deaths ==
- 11 November – Pedro Nolasco Cruz Vergara (b. 1857)
