= 1804 in Chile =

- Decades: 1780s; 1790s; 1800s; 1810s; 1820s
- See also: Other events in 1804 · Timeline of Chilean history

The following lists events that happened during 1804 in Chile.

== Incumbent ==
- Royal Governor of Chile: Luis Muñoz de Guzmán

== Births ==
March 20 - Manuel Camilo Vial, politician (d. 1882)

November 2 - Rafael Valentín Valdivieso, Catholic priest (d. 1878)
