= 1802 in Chile =

- Decades: 1780s; 1790s; 1800s; 1810s; 1820s
- See also: Other events in 1802 · Timeline of Chilean history

The following lists of events that happened during 1802 in Chile.

== Incumbents ==
- Royal Governor of Chile: Luis Muñoz de Guzmán

== Events ==
1802 - Bernardo O'Higgins returns to Chile and becomes a gentleman farmer.

== Births ==
1802: José Anacleto Montt Goyenechea, lawyer
