= 2007 in Chile =

- Decades: 1980s; 1990s; 2000s; 2010s; 2020s
- See also: Other events of 2007; Timeline of Chilean history

Events from the year 2007 in Chile

== Incumbents ==
- President: Michelle Bachelet

== Events ==
=== March ===
- March 26: President of Chile Michelle Bachelet sacks several ministers, including the Minister for National Defence Vivianne Blanlot Soza and the Minister for Justice Isidro Solís Palma for perceived poor performance as well as her chief of staff. The Minister for Transport Sergio Espejo Yaksic is sacked for problems with Santiago's new transport system Transantiago.

=== April ===
- April 21: At least 10 people are missing in Chile following a 6.2 magnitude earthquake in Aysen.

=== May ===
- May 5: More than 20 countries including the People's Republic of China, the United States, France, Japan, Chile and South Korea agree to work together to end bottom sea trawling.

=== July ===
- July 11: A Chilean court rejects the extradition of former Peruvian President Alberto Fujimori.
- July 20: 2007 FIFA U-20 World Cup: After the Argentina vs Chile semi-final game ended, a scuffle between Toronto Police officers and members of the Chilean team led to the arrest of 21 players.

=== August ===
- August 3: The former deputy director of Augusto Pinochet's secret police, Raul Iturriaga, is captured by the police after having entered in rebellion in June 2007 against the Chilean state and justice.
- August 12: Peru issues a map of outlining its claim to maritime territory also claimed by Chile.
- August 13: Chile withdraws its ambassador from Peru for consultations after Peru publishes a map of maritime territory claimed by both countries.
- August 15: A powerful earthquake measuring 7.9 on the Richter Scale rocks Peru 100 miles near Lima, according to the U.S. Geological Survey. A tsunami warning is issued for Peru, Ecuador, Chile and Colombia, following the earthquakes. At least 72 people are killed and another 680 injured.
- August 28: The Supreme Court of Chile confirms a life sentence for Hugo Salas Wenzel, a Chilean general under former dictator Augusto Pinochet, for his role in the murder of 12 opponents of the regime.
- August 29: Thousands of people protest in Chile against the economic policies of the President Michelle Bachelet with 350 arrests made when they attempt to enter the grounds of the presidential palace.
- August 30: More than 450 people have been arrested after protests in which police used tear gas and water cannons in Chile's capital, Santiago.
- August 31: Twelve Chileans including a Catholic priest are charged for alleged involvement in death squads during the rule of General Augusto Pinochet.

=== September ===
- September 3: Japan and Chile sign a free trade agreement.
- September 21: Chilean Supreme Court approves extradition of Peruvian ex-president Alberto Fujimori on numerous charges, including the massacres of Barrios Altos and La Cantuta.
- September 22: Former Peruvian President Alberto Fujimori arrives in Lima a day after Chile's Supreme Court ruled his extradition back to his home country due to charges of human rights abuses and corruption.

=== October ===
- October 4: Family members of deceased de facto president of Chile Augusto Pinochet are arrested in Santiago on charges of embezzlement.

=== November ===
- November 14: A 7.7-magnitude earthquake hits northern Chile, near the town of Calama. Two deaths and over a hundred injuries are reported.
- November 15: Powerful aftershocks hit Chile after the Antofagasta earthquake, as President Michelle Bachelet visits the affected areas.
- November 17: 2007 Tocopilla earthquake: Chile is hit by a magnitude 6.0 aftershock 41 miles northwest of Antofagasta.

=== December ===
- December 17: The leaders of Brazil, Bolivia, and Chile agree to build a highway by 2009 that will link the Atlantic (in Santos, Brazil) and the Pacific (in Iquique, Chile) coasts of South America.

== Deaths ==
- July 4: Osvaldo Romo, 70, security agent jailed for human rights abuses during Pinochet regime, heart and respiratory problems.
- August 28: Anacleto Angelini, 93, businessman, South America's richest man, emphysema.
- December 23: Osvaldo Reyes, 88, painter, stroke.
