= 1996 in Chile =

- Decades: 1970s; 1980s; 1990s; 2000s; 2010s
- See also: Other events of 1996; Timeline of Chilean history

The following lists events that happened during 1996 in Chile.

== Incumbents ==
- President of Chile: Eduardo Frei Ruiz-Tagle

== Events ==
=== December ===
- 5 December – The Canada–Chile Free Trade Agreement is signed.

== Deaths ==
- 4 January – Ramón Vinay, operatic tenor (born 1911)
- 18 March – Osvaldo Rodríguez (Chilean), poet (born 1943)
- 30 August – José Toribio Merino, admiral (born 1915)
- 6 September – Ester Soré, musician (born 1915)
- 13 September – César Mendoza, police officer and politician (born 1918)
- 7 December – José Donoso, writer (born 1924)
