= 1807 in Chile =

- Decades: 1780s; 1790s; 1800s; 1810s; 1820s
- See also: Other events in 1807 · Timeline of Chilean history

The following lists events that happened during 1807 in Chile.

== Incumbent ==
Royal Governor of Chile: Luis Muñoz de Guzmán

== Births ==
5 April - Vicente Pérez Rosales, politician (d. 1886)
