= 2008 in Chile =

- Decades: 1980s; 1990s; 2000s; 2010s; 2020s
- See also: Other events of 2008; Timeline of Chilean history

The following lists events that happened during 2008 in Chile.

== Incumbents ==
- President: Michelle Bachelet

== Events ==
=== January ===
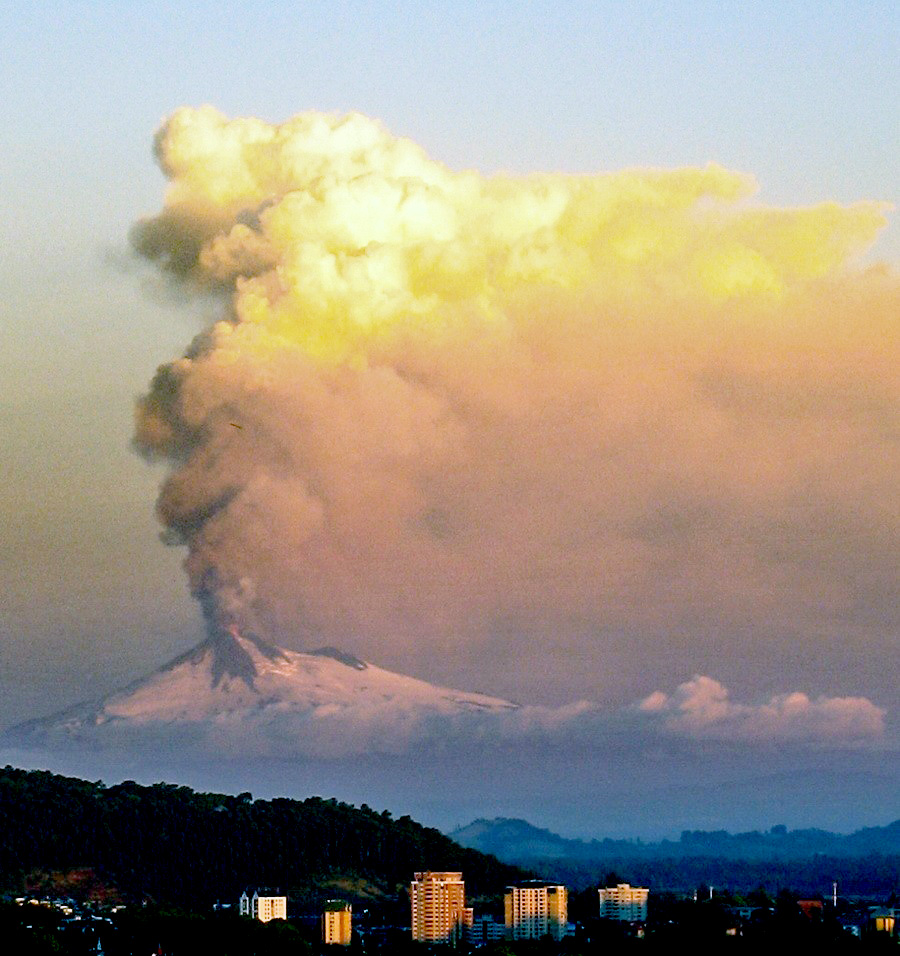
Eruption of the volcano Llaima.

- January 1: The Llaima volcano erupts.
- January 3: Carabineros special forces kill Mapuche student Matías Catrileo during the taking of an agricultural plot.
- January 10: The football team Unión Temuco from Padre Las Casas, Chile is founded.
- January 16: Peru sues Chile in International Court of Justice over a maritime dispute.
- January 18: The XXXIX Huaso Festival of Olmué begins, animated by Leo Caprile and broadcast by Chilevisión.

=== February ===
- February 12: After the cancellation of the 2008 Dakar Rally, the 2009 event in Chile and Argentina is confirmed.
- February 20:
  - The last lunar eclipse of the decade is visible throughout the country.
  - The XLIX Viña del Mar International Song Festival begins, with the leadership of the television animators Tonka Tomicic and Sergio Lagos.
- February 27: Aviation tragedy in Peñalolé. A Carabineros training plane crashes in the Municipal Stadium of Peñalolén, killing its six crew members and six other people who were on the premises.

=== March ===
- March 1: ADN Radio Chile begins its broadcasts with an interview with President Michelle Bachelet.

=== April ===
- April 3: The Minister of Education, Yasna Provoste, is suspended from office after the Chamber of Deputies approved a constitutional accusation against her in the wake of a Subsidies case.
- April 5: The City Tower is inaugurated in the Great Conception, the tallest building in the city.
- April 17: The shopping center Espacio Urbano Pionero opens, located in Punta Arenas and controlled by D&S, the southernmost of the company.

=== May ===
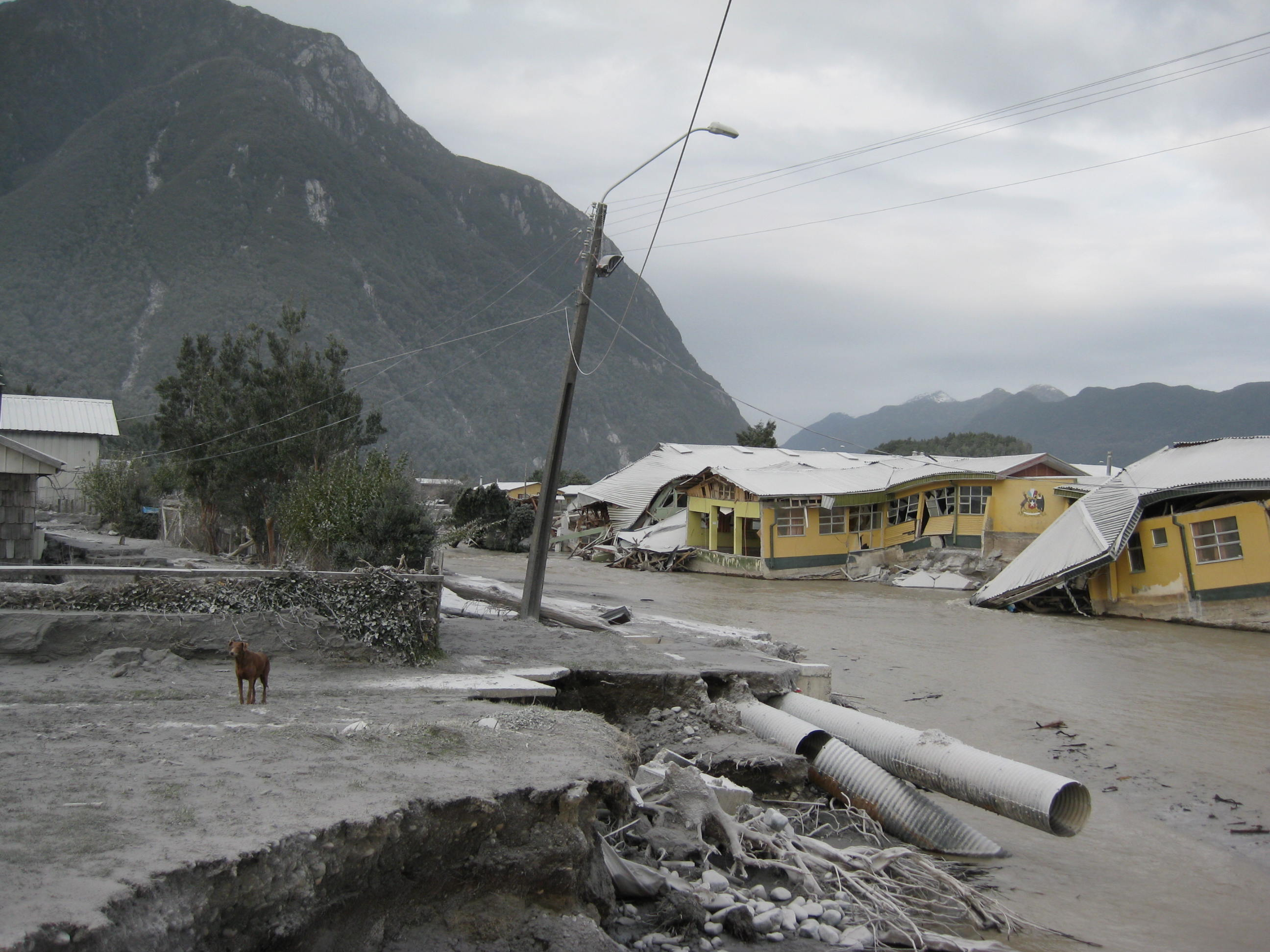
Destruction caused by the eruption of Chaitén Volcano.

- May 2: The Chaitén Volcano erupts. Authorities evacuate the city of Chaitén and other affected areas.
- May 16: The Alameda Mall Plaza opens in the district Estación Central.
- May 20: El Diario de Concepción is founded.
- May 23: The Carretera Austral between Hornopirén and El Amarillo is closed in the Los Lagos Region to prevent the arrival of civilians in Chaitén.

=== July ===
- July 2: The newspaper El Pingüino is founded, published in Punta Arenas.
- July 14: A minor, María Música Sepúlveda, throws a jar with water to the Minister of Education Mónica Jiménez.
- July 21: By Decree Exempt No. 2,416, the Building of the Chillan Electric Cooperative is declared a National Monument in the category of "Historical Monument."

=== August ===
- August 29: Putre tragedy, nine girls from the Cumbres School die after the bus overturns.

=== September ===
- September 15: In the Palace of La Moneda, a UNASUR meeting is held to discuss the political crisis in Bolivia.
- September 18: The 198th Anniversary of the first Governing Board is celebrated.

=== October ===
- October 3: A 400-gram TNT pump is placed in the offices of the Manufacturing Development Corporation (SOFOFA). Around two thousand people who worked in the building are evacuated. The GOPE manages to deactivate the bomb a few minutes before it explodes. Nobody is convicted of the attempted attack, however, several antisystemic groups are suspected.
- October 26: Municipal Elections.

=== November ===
- November 28 and 29: XXII version of the Telethon. With a goal of raising 13,255,231,970 Chilean pesos, which it widely exceeded, reaching up to 16,589,850,127 Chilean pesos. The most remembered of this Telethon will be the donations of two Chilean magnates, who donate 1,000,000,000 Chilean pesos each.

=== December ===
- December 4: CNN Chile first airs as the first Chilean news channel that is 24/7 and the channel was the first CNN branch in Latin America.
- December 6: The elected mayors of the 346 communes of Chile assume office.
- December 15: Mall Plaza Sur is inaugurated, located in San Bernardo, one of the largest in the country.
- December 18: A strong earthquake measuring 6.2 on the Richter scale affects the central area of the country between La Serena-Coquimbo and Talca. The most affected cities are Gran Valparaíso, San Antonio and Santiago; however, there are no deaths or serious material damage.
- December 24: The street vendors of the "Meiggs neighborhood" protest against the mayor of Santiago Pablo Zalaquett for lying to them about the authorization of street vendors.
- December 27 and 28: The 8th version is performed Valparaíso Cultural Carnival in the homonymous city.

=== Full date unknown ===
- Chilean Heart, robotics team is founded.
