= 1800 in Chile =

- Decades: 1780s; 1790s; 1800s; 1810s; 1820s
- See also: Other events in 1800 · Timeline of Chilean history

The following lists events that happened during 1800 in Chile.

== Incumbents ==
- Royal Governor of Chile: Joaquín del Pino Sánchez de Rojas

== Events ==
July 3 - The city of San Carlos is founded.
