= 1809 in Chile =

- Decades: 1780s; 1790s; 1800s; 1810s; 1820s
- See also: Other events in 1809 · Timeline of Chilean history

The following lists events that happened during 1809 in Chile.

== Incumbents ==
Royal Governor of Chile: Francisco Antonio García Carrasco

== Events ==
1809: The Scorpion Scandal hastened Chilean independence.

== Births ==
- 1809: José Santos Lira Calvo (d. 1887/
- 4 September: Manuel Montt (d. 1880)
