= 1992 in Chile =

- Decades: 1970s; 1980s; 1990s; 2000s; 2010s
- See also: Other events of 1992; Timeline of Chilean history

The following lists events that happened during 1992 in Chile.

== Incumbents ==
- President of Chile: Patricio Aylwin

== Events ==
=== March ===
- 9 March – Buenos Días a Todos airs for the first time.

=== October ===
- 2–4 October – 1992 South American Youth Championships in Athletics

=== November ===
- 27–28 November – 1992 Chilean telethon

== Sport ==
- Chile at the 1992 Summer Olympics
- Chile at the 1992 Winter Olympics
- 1992 Copa Chile
- 1992 Copa Interamericana
- 1992 Recopa Sudamericana

== Births ==
- 3 March – María Jesús Matthei
- 13 March – Jayson Mena

== Deaths ==
- date unknown – César Barros (b. 1912)
