= 2009 in Chile =

- Decades: 1980s; 1990s; 2000s; 2010s; 2020s
- See also: Other events of 2009; Timeline of Chilean history

The following lists events that happened during 2009 in Chile.

== Incumbents ==
- President: Michelle Bachelet (Socialist)

== Events ==
=== January ===
- January 3: In Reñaca a sewage pipe breaks, and causes flooding on Borgoño Street all the way to the beach. When the break first occurs, human feces could be seen flowing in the street.
- January 11: The second Summit of Chilean Rock is held.
- January 21: Details about the Mirage Case emerge, which see the sees the ex-Commander-in-Chief of the Chilean Air Force, Ramón Vega Hidalgo involved in the scandal. Repercussions were felt in branches of military and civil service, among organizations such as the Chilean Air Force, and also by relevant people involved in the purchase of the Mirage aircraft, such as ex-presidents Patricio Aylwin and Eduardo Frei Ruiz-Tagle.

=== October ===
- October 24 – A referendum on restricting immigration was held in Easter Island. It followed protests in August 2009 when protestors blocked the runway at Mataveri International Airport in protest at immigration from Chile. The proposal was approved by over 90% of voters.

=== December ===
- December 11 – In Cerro Paranal, the VISTA survey telescope begins work at the Paranal Observatory.
