= 2003 in Chile =

- Decades: 1980s; 1990s; 2000s; 2010s; 2020s
- See also: Other events of 2003; Timeline of Chilean history

The following lists events that happened during 2003 in Chile.

== Incumbents ==
- President of Chile: Ricardo Lagos

== Events ==
- MOP-Gate case

=== June ===
- 6 June – The Chile–United States Free Trade Agreement is signed.

== Deaths ==
- 15 January – Eduardo Alquinta (born 1945)
- 21 April – Fernando Campos Harriet (born 1910)
- 15 July – Roberto Bolaño (born 1953)
- 19 July – Elena Caffarena (born 1903)
- 29 October – Jaime Castillo Velasco (born 1914)
