= 1938 in Chile =

- Decades: 1910s; 1920s; 1930s; 1940s; 1950s
- See also: Other events of 1938; Timeline of Chilean history

The following lists events that happened during 1938 in Chile.

== Incumbents ==
- President of Chile: Arturo Alessandri (until 25 December), Pedro Aguirre Cerda

== Events ==
=== September ===
- 5 September – Seguro Obrero massacre

=== October ===
- 25 October – Chilean presidential election, 1938

== Births ==
- date unknown – Óscar Hahn
- 18 January – Manuel Rodríguez (footballer) (d. 2018)
- 2 February – Sergio Ortega (d. 2003)
- 2 March – Ricardo Lagos
- 21 May – Luis Hernán Álvarez (d. 1991)
- 7 June – Armando Tobar (d. 2016)
- 7 October – Carlos Contreras (footballer, born 1938) (d. 2020)
- 9 October – Humberto Donoso (d. 2000)
- 7 November – Eugenio Pizarro
- 25 November – Alberto Valentini (d. 2009)
- 20 December – Patricio Rodríguez (d. 2020)

== Deaths ==
- 22 May – Víctor Morales (Chilean footballer)
- 25 July – Luis Altamirano
