= Osvaldo Reyes =

Chilean artist (1919–2007)

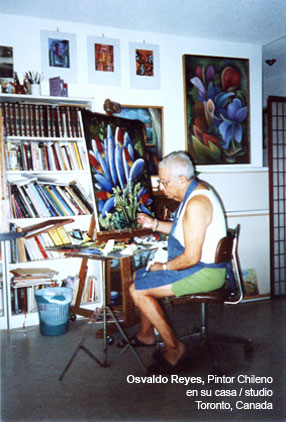
- Born: May 26, 1919; Santiago, Chile
- Died: December 23, 2007 (aged 88); Toronto, Canada
- Occupation: Artist

Osvaldo Reyes Herrera (May 26, 1919 – December 23, 2007) was a Chilean artist who lived in Chile, Mexico, and Canada.

== Early life ==
The eldest child of a railway baggage porter and a seamstress, he had to help support the family financially to ensure that his seven siblings were able to finish their education, while he studied to be a teacher. He was born in Santiago, Chile in 1919, when the world was reeling from the First World War. He experienced poverty and inequality firsthand, and had to strive hard to overcome them. He grew up in the Santiago barrio of Estación Central, which in those days was on the outskirts of the city. His teenage years coincided with the devastating effects of the Great Depression in the thirties in Chile, when the country suffered the bankruptcies and layoffs that provoked the worst social crisis in Latin America's history.

He married in secret so he could stay to care for his family, instead of starting his own household. The first of his family to get an education, he made sure his siblings got the same opportunity, and later taught art to underprivileged and special needs children.

== Career ==
=== As an art educator ===
In Chile

In his first post as a teacher, in the southern city of Puerto Natales, Chile, he taught classes of children who came to school barefoot in spite of the cold, in a small school with glassless windows, shaken by the gusts of icy wind typical of the Chilean south. Most of his students could not read or write, nor could their parents. He succeeded in helping several of these children on the road to success, and in the process he acquired the conviction that his country was in need of profound change. It was in those years that he came to define himself as a socialist, a conviction which he held to the end of his days.

On returning to Santiago, he enrolled to study Fine Arts at the University of Chile, where he stood out as one of the most promising students, and for his activity as a student leader, as he became president of the student centre.

In 1945, Osvaldo, along with Fernando Marcos, Carmen Cereceda and other mural painters from the School of Fine Arts, formed the "Group of Mural Painters of the Ministry of Education", their goal being to paint murals in the schools of Chile. One of the goals of this project was to involve children and give them the technical skills to go on to become artists.

Studying in Mexico

For his academic achievements, he received a scholarship to study painting in Mexico, where he studied art with the great Mexican muralists David Alfaro Siqueiros, Diego Rivera, Federico Cantu, Francisco de la Maza, Jose Gutierrez and Raul Anguiano. The Mexican influence on Osvaldo Reyes’ painting would always be evident in its expressive vigour and luminosity, as well as in the lines and shapes that characterized his drawing.

During his stay in Mexico, he worked for three months as an assistant to the Nobel Award winner Chilean poet Gabriela Mistral. In his return to Chile he painted the mural "La Ronda", which was inspired by the work of Gabriela Mistral of the same name.

Return to Chile

On returning from his scholarship, he became absorbed in academic work. He helped other painters to go to Mexico to study. He participated in the travelling mural exhibition “Las 40 Medidas” (“The 40 Measures”), inspired by Allende’s presidential program in 1970, which travelled around the country. The panels from this exhibition were destroyed by the dictatorship.

He was a professor and director of the Escuela Experimental Artistica until September, 1973. This institution is known for producing hundreds of Chilean artists in a wide variety of artistic disciplines.

In the mid 1960s Osvaldo was involved, along with his students and other collaborators, in the painting of the pro Allende political murals.

The Escuela Experimental Artística was a unique establishment in Latin America, which offered grants to artistically talented children from all over the country and brought them to Santiago to receive primary, secondary and art education; it was an innovative public education project which was later copied in other countries. Hundreds of Chilean artists from all disciplines studied in this school.

Return to Mexico

Shortly after the military coup, Reyes was dismissed from his position by the Pinochet dictatorship. He was lucky; more than a thousand people were detained and disappeared, another thousand murdered, more than thirty thousand tortured and hundreds of thousands forced into exile in the 17 years of the Pinochet regime. In 1978 Reyes left with his wife, Carmen, and the two youngest of their five children for Mexico and worked at the San Carlos Academy of Art for ten years.

Migration to Canada

The family's separation tormented him, so when some of their older offspring later moved to Canada, Reyes and his wife followed in 1988. With this move, Osvaldo Reyes had to adapt to a new culture, a new language, and, above all, a greater distance from his native land. He succeeded in making his way in Canada, which also became home to his family. In his Toronto workshop, he painted and drew with discipline every day.

== Exhibitions and reception ==
His work has been exhibited in Chile, Mexico, and Canada and in 2003, on the 30th anniversary of the military coup, Reyes presented a retrospective exhibition at the Museum of Contemporary Art in Santiago, Chile, sponsored by the Canadian Embassy in Santiago, the Chilean Consulate in Toronto and the Bureau for the Chilean Community Abroad.

The Mexican muralist Raul Anguiano commented in 1987 that Osvaldo Reyes' work can be placed "among the Latin American masters such as Guayasamin, Amelia Perez o Portinari, with a modernist touch that resembles the work of Leger and other German expressionists".

He died in Toronto, Canada after suffering a stroke.
