= 1995 in Chile =

- Decades: 1970s; 1980s; 1990s; 2000s; 2010s
- See also: Other events of 1995; Timeline of Chilean history

The following lists events that happened during 1995 in Chile.

== Incumbents ==
- President of Chile: Eduardo Frei Ruiz-Tagle

== Events ==
- Hypermarket Líder is founded.

=== July ===
- 30 July – 1995 Antofagasta earthquake

=== August ===
- August – White Earthquake

=== September ===
- 5–7 September – 1995 South American Junior Championships in Athletics

=== December ===
- 1–2 December – 1995 Chilean telethon

== Sport ==
- 1995 Movistar Open
- 1995 Primera División de Chile
- 1995 Canada Cup
- 1995 Copa Chile
- Chile national football team 1995
- Chile at the 1995 Pan American Games

== Births ==
- 19 October – Sammis Reyes, American football player

== Deaths ==
- 11 January – Roque Esteban Scarpa (born 1914)
- 12 April – Alberto Larraguibel (born 1919)
- 1 October – Felipe Rivera (born 1971)
- 27 October – Marta Colvin (born 1907)
