= Buenaventura Cousiño Jorquera =

Member of Parliament, Republic of Chile
- In office 1843–1846
- Preceded by: José Joaquín Pérez Mascayano
- Succeeded by: Joaquín Campino Salamanca
- Constituency: Rere and Department of Puchacay

Member of Parliament, Republic of Chile
- In office 1846–1849
- Preceded by: Francisco de la Lastra de la Sotta
- Succeeded by: Antonio García Reyes
- Constituency: Osorno and Llanquihue

Member of Parliament, Republic of Chile
- In office 1849–1852
- Preceded by: Santos Díaz Valdés Carrera
- Succeeded by: Miguel Barros Morán
- Constituency: Melipilla an La Victoria

Personal details
- Born: July 18, 1808 Renca, Viceroyalty of Peru
- Died: December 29, 1855 (aged 47) Chile, Santiago de Chile, Chile
- Citizenship: Chile
- Party: Chilean Conservative Party
- Spouse: Rosario Ortúzar Castillo
- Occupation: Lawyer and Professor

Buenaventura (Ventura) Cousiño Jorquera (1808–1855) was a Chilean congressman, lawyer and politician. He was born on the Renca ranch in Santiago on July 18, 1808, and died in Santiago on November 29, 1855.

== Biography ==
Jorquera was the son of José Agustín Cousiño y Zapata and Doña Josefa Jorquera y Alfaro, grandson of Juan Antonio Cousiño Orgue, a native of La Coruña, Galicia, the first Cousiño to arrive in Chile.

He studied at the National Institute and graduated as a lawyer from the faculty of law at the San Felipe University in 1836.

He later married Rosario Ortúzar Castillo, with whom he produced many children. He devoted himself to different fora, to teaching and politics.

== Political career ==
He conducted Latin classes at the National Institute and in 1845 he joined the Faculty of Philosophy and Humanities at the University of Chile, where he delivered a speech on "Excellence in Latin literature", a work that was published in the Annals of the university.

He conducted several trips to the north, especially to Copiapo, where his son Henry was born.

He was elected deputy for Rere and Puchacay in 1840, but did not have the opportunity to replace the proprietary deputy. He served as a deputy in 1843 for Rere. In 1846 he was elected representative of Osorno. During this time he joined the Standing Committee on Government, Foreign Affairs and Education and Charities. He was Deputy of Melipilla, in 1849, working on the Standing Committee on Constitution, Law and Justice, and Government and Foreign Affairs.
