= Luisa Toledo =

Chilean human rights activist (1939–2021)

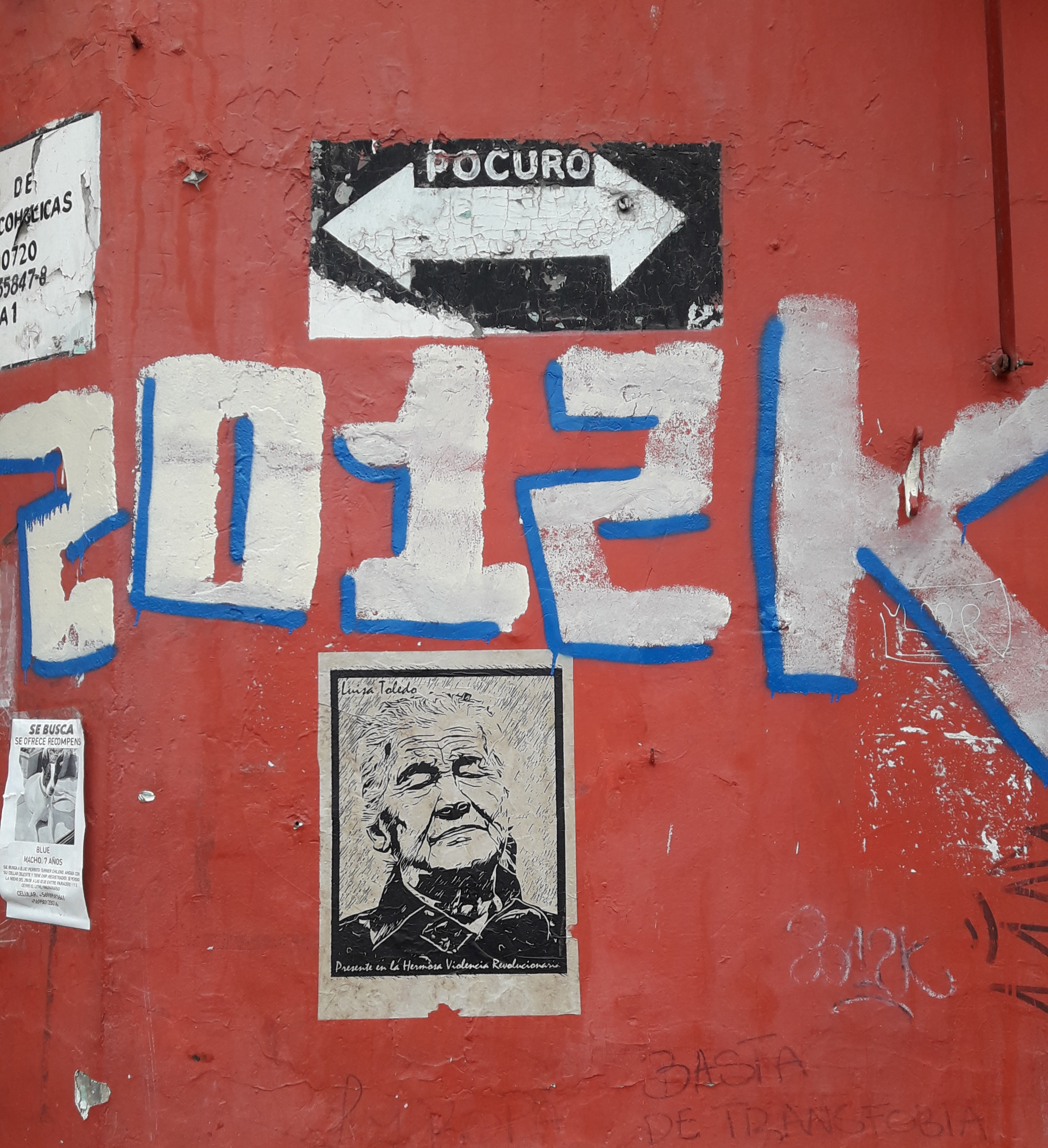
- Born: Luisa de las Mercedes Toledo Sepúlveda; 21 June 1939
- Died: 6 July 2021 (aged 82); Santiago, Chile
- Resting place: Santiago General Cemetery
- Occupation: Human rights activist
- Spouse: Manuel Vergara Meza
- Children: 4

Luisa de las Mercedes Toledo Sepúlveda (21 June 1939 – 6 July 2021) was a Chilean human rights activist and the mother of the Vergara Toledo brothers, who were murdered by the Carabineros de Chile during the military dictatorship.

== Early life and family ==
Toledo was born on 21 June 1939 to Manuel Toledo Álvarez and Mercedes Sepúlveda Rodríguez.

In 1960, aged 21, Toledo met Manuel Vergara Meza, a labourer and leader in the Young Christian Workers, whilst working as a secretary at a factory. Toledo and Vergara later married on 1 December 1962. In 1963, (Note: Also cited as 1962.) Toledo and Vergara moved to the José Cardán neighborhood (Note: Opposite the Villa Francia neighborhood.) in the Estación Central commune in Santiago.

Toledo and Vergara had four children:

- Pablo Orlando Vergara Toledo (1963–1988), engineer and member of the Revolutionary Left Movement (MIR)
- Eduardo Antonio Vergara Toledo (1965–1985), student and member of the MIR
- Rafael Mauricio Vergara Toledo (1967–1985), student and member of the MIR
- Ana Luisa Vergara Toledo (born 1968), member of the MIR

== Activism ==
Toledo was a supporter of the government of Salvador Allende. Following the 1973 Chilean coup d'état Toledo and Vergara joined the Villa Francia neighborhood resistance. In 1974, Toledo began working at the Committee of Cooperation for Peace in Chile where she transcribed reports of human rights violations and worked as a secretary for José Zalaquett. In 1975, Toledo began working at the Vicariate of Solidarity, the committee's successor. Both Toledo and Vergara were devout Catholics and were followers of Mariano Puga Concha.

=== Murder of the Vergara Toledo brothers ===
On 29 March 1985, Toledo's sons Eduardo and Rafael were murdered by the Carabineros de Chile in Villa Francia. Toledo's eldest son and daughter went into exile in Spain.

On 5 November 1988, Toledo's eldest son Pablo died in Cerro Mariposa, Temuco alongside Aracely Victoria Romo Álvarez, a following member of the MIR, following a bomb explosion. Having allegedly planned to blow up a high-voltage tower, the nature Pablo's and Romo's death is still under investigation.

== Personal life ==
Toledo died of stomach cancer on 6 July 2021 in Santiago, aged 82. Toledo is buried at Santiago General Cemetery.
