= 2002 in Chile =

- Decades: 1980s; 1990s; 2000s; 2010s; 2020s
- See also: Other events of 2002; Timeline of Chilean history

The following lists events that happened during 2002 in Chile.

== Incumbents ==
- President of Chile: Ricardo Lagos

== Events ==
=== June ===
- 2–5 June – Intense rainfall causes the 2002 Northern Chile floods and mudflow that hit Coquimbo and Valparaíso leading to the deaths of 17 people.

=== September ===
- 14–15 September – 2002 South American Race Walking Championships

== Deaths ==
- 7 June – Anselmo Sule (born 1934)
- 5 August – Francisco Coloane (born 1910)
- 23 November – Roberto Matta (born 1911)
