= 1944 in Chile =

- Decades: 1920s; 1930s; 1940s; 1950s; 1960s
- See also: Other events of 1944; Timeline of Chilean history

The following lists events that happened during 1944 in Chile.

== Incumbents ==
- President of Chile: Juan Antonio Ríos

== Events ==
=== April ===
- 2 April - municipal elections are held, The Democratic Alliance obtains 50.46% of the votes, followed by the Conservative Party with 20.94% and the Liberal Party with 14.10%.

=== May ===
- 21 May – The Naval de Talcahuano football club is founded.

== Births ==
- 15 January – Julio Videla (d. 2020)
- 16 January – Juan Manuel Rodríguez Vega (d. 2021)
- 14 March – Marta Larraechea
- 27 March – Miguel Enríquez (politician) (d. 1974)
- 6 June – Patricio Cornejo
- 16 July – Leopoldo Vallejos
- 30 July – Roberto Hodge
- 9 October – Antonio Arias (footballer)
- 18 December – Jorge Pinto Rodríguez

== Deaths ==
- 26 September – Pedro Dartnell (b. 1873)
