= Felipe Araya =

Chilean footballer (born 1990)

Personal information
- Full name: Felipe Araya Urrutia
- Date of birth: 14 December 1990 (age 35)
- Place of birth: El Salvador, Chile
- Height: 1.70 m (5 ft 7 in)
- Position: Striker

Youth career
- Cobresal

Senior career*
Years	Team	Apps	(Gls)
2010–2012	Cobresal	6	(1)
2013	Coquimbo Unido	1	(0)
2013–2014	Deportes Linares	21	(9)
2014–2016	Curicó Unido	23	(3)
2016–2017	Ind. Cauquenes	30	(10)
2017–2018	Deportes Melipilla	17	(2)
- * Club domestic league appearances and goals as of 16 February 2019

Felipe Araya Urrutia (born 14 December 1990) is a Chilean footballer who plays as striker.
