= Jayson Mena =

Chilean footballer (born 1992)

Personal information
- Full name: Jayson Jordan Mena Gutiérrez
- Date of birth: 13 March 1992 (age 34)
- Place of birth: Concepción, Chile
- Height: 1.71 m (5 ft 7 1/2 in)
- Position: Midfielder

Senior career*
| Years | Team | Apps | (Gls) |
| 2012–2014 | U. de Concepción | 9 | (0) |
| 2014–2015 | Deportes Puerto Montt | 9 | (0) |
| 2015–2017 | Provincial Osorno | 19 | (0) |
- * Club domestic league appearances and goals as of 30 March 2020

Jayson Jordan Mena Gutiérrez (born 13 March 1992) is a Chilean footballer. His last club was Provincial Osorno.

== Honours ==
=== Player ===
Universidad de Concepción

- Primera B (1): 2013

Deportes Puerto Montt

- Segunda División Profesional (1): 2014–15
