= 1999 in Chile =

- Decades: 1970s; 1980s; 1990s; 2000s; 2010s
- See also: Other events of 1999; Timeline of Chilean history

The following lists events that happened during 1999 in Chile.

== Incumbents ==
- President of Chile: Eduardo Frei Ruiz-Tagle

== Events ==
=== December ===
- 12 December – Presidential elections are held in Chile, resulting in a runoff on 16 January 2000.

== Deaths ==
- 9 April – Raúl Silva Henríquez (b. 1907)
- 18 April – Enrique Hormazábal (b. 1931)
- 29 September – Gustavo Leigh (b. 1920)
