= 1942 in Chile =

- Decades: 1920s; 1930s; 1940s; 1950s; 1960s
- See also: Other events of 1942; Timeline of Chilean history

The following lists events that happened during 1942 in Chile.

== Incumbents ==
- President of Chile: Jerónimo Méndez (until 2 April), Juan Antonio Ríos

== Events ==
=== February ===
- 1 February – Chilean presidential election, 1942 is held giving Juan Antonio Rios elected as President of the Republic.

=== March ===
- 7–17 March – The 1942 South American Basketball Championship is held in Santiago.

=== May ===
- 12 May - The Catholic University rugby team of the city of Santiago, Santiago Metropolitan Region, is founded.

=== July ===
- 24 July - The College of Pharmacists of Chile is founded under Law No. 7,205, constituting itself as a Trade association.

=== September ===
- 6 September - At 9:43 p.m. there was an Earthquake of 7.3 degrees on Richter magnitude scale and whose epicenter was located in the vicinity of Caldera, Atacama Region . It left a balance of 5 dead, 16 injured and 705 homeless; It also caused a medium intensity Tsunami between Lima, Peru and Puerto Saavedra in the Araucania Region.

=== November ===
- 20 November - The National Prize of Literature the country's largest literature award, is created; This under Law No. 7,368, which also creates the National Prize of Art of Chile that begins to be awarded since 1944.

=== December ===
- 18 December - the Quinta Normal Fire Department is founded in the Commune of Quinta Normal in Santiago.

== Births ==
- 23 January – Pedro Araya Toro
- 1 May – Carlos Cardoen
- 1 June – Honorino Landa (d. 1987)
- 24 June – Eduardo Frei Ruiz-Tagle
- 9 August – Miguel Littín
- 10 August – Augusto Parra Muñoz, diplomat
- 8 September – Beatriz Allende (d. 1977)
- 6 December – Rubén Marcos (d. 2006)
- 27 December – Juan Inostroza

== Deaths ==
- 9 August – Juan Subercaseaux (b. 1896)
