= 1941 in Chile =

- Decades: 1920s; 1930s; 1940s; 1950s; 1960s
- See also: Other events of 1941; Timeline of Chilean history

The following lists events that happened during 1941 in Chile.

== Incumbents ==
- President of Chile: Pedro Aguirre Cerda (until 25 November), Jerónimo Méndez

== Events ==
=== February ===
- 2 February – The 1941 South American Championship held in Chile begins.

=== March ===
- 2 March – Chilean parliamentary election, 1941
- 4 March - ends the 1941 South American Championship held in Chile.

=== April ===
- 6 April - Municipal elections are held throughout the country, the Popular Front obtains 35.46% of the total votes, followed by the Liberal Party with 19.18%, the Conservative Party with 16.41%, and the Socialist Party with 14.46%.

== Births ==
- 20 February – Juan Olivares
- 16 July – Gladys Marín (d. 2005)
- 26 September – Rodrigo González Torres
- 31 December – Hugo Berly (d. 2009)

== Deaths ==
- date unknown – Emilio Bello
- 25 November – Pedro Aguirre Cerda
