= 1946 in Chile =

- Decades: 1920s; 1930s; 1940s; 1950s; 1960s
- See also: Other events of 1946; Timeline of Chilean history

The following lists events that happened during 1946 in Chile.

== Incumbents ==
- President of Chile: Juan Antonio Ríos (until 27 June), Alfredo Duhalde (until 17 October), Juan Antonio Iribarren (until 3 November), Gabriel González Videla

== Events ==
=== January ===
- 17 January - Juan Antonio Rios, president of Chile, hands over the command of the country to Alfredo Duhalde Vásquez, who takes office as "Vice President of the Republic of Chile".
- 22 January - Due to the strike of the workers of the Mapocho Saltpeter Offices and Humberstone, who sued Cosatan for the rise in prices in the grocery stores, the Minister of Labor Mariano Bustos annuls the legal personality of the unions. Due to the failure of the Communist senators Elías Lafertte and Pablo Neruda, the workers call for a march on the 28th of the month.
- 28 January - In Plaza Bulnes, after a march by various nitrate unions from Plaza Los Artesanos, the police, following superior orders, fired on the workers, killing 6 people in what is known as the Plaza Bulnes Massacre.

=== June ===
- June 27 - died of cancer at his home in Villa Paidahue, La Reina, Santiago the incumbent President of the Republic, Juan Antonio Rios, unable to finish his presidential term. 3 days of national mourning are decreed.
- 28 June - Alfredo Duhalde Vásquez, Minister of the Interior of Juan Antonio Ríos, takes possession of the country, his first act is the call for presidential elections for September 4 of the same year.

=== August ===
- August 2 - At 3:19 p.m. local time, an earthquake measuring 8.3 degrees on the Richter scale with an epicenter in the Chilean Sea, near the town of Caldera, affecting the entire northern part of the country; and causing the death of 8 people. Minutes later, a Tsunami with waves up to 2 meters high affected the coasts of that area of the country.

=== September ===
- 4 September – Chilean presidential election, 1946

=== November ===
- 3 November - Gabriel González Videla assumes the presidency of the republic for the period November 3, 1946 - November 3, 1952.

== Births ==
- 3 January – Bernardo de la Maza
- 18 January – Adolfo Nef
- 27 March – Horacio Saavedra
- 3 April – Pedro García Barros
- 28 June – Jaime Guzmán (d. 1991)
- 25 October – Elías Figueroa
- Date unknown - Oliver Welden (d. 2021)

== Deaths ==
- 28 January – Ramona Parra (b. 1926)
- 27 June – Juan Antonio Ríos (b. 1888)
