= 2009 Easter Island immigration referendum =

- 24 October 2009

Results
| Choice | Votes | % |
|---|---|---|
| Yes | 678 | 96.31% |
| No | 26 | 3.69% |
| Valid votes | 704 | 99.72% |
| Invalid or blank votes | 2 | 0.28% |
| Total votes | 706 | 100.00% |
| Registered voters/turnout | 1,300 | 54.31% |

A referendum on restricting immigration was held in Easter Island on 24 October 2009. It followed protests in August 2009 when protestors blocked the runway at Mataveri International Airport in protest at immigration from Chile. The proposal was approved by over 90% of voters. As a result of the vote, the Chilean government introduced a Special Visitor's Card for visitors to the island. However, in October 2009, the Supreme Court ruled that the card violated the constitutional right to free movement. In August 2018, a law took effect prohibiting non-residents from staying on the island for more than 30 days.

== Results ==
| Choice | Votes | % |
|---|---|---|
| For | 678 | 96.31 |
| Against | 26 | 3.69 |
| Invalid/blank votes | 2 | – |
| Total | 706 | 100 |
| Registered voters/turnout | 1,300 | 54.31 |
Source: Direct Democracy
