= 1994 in Chile =

- Decades: 1970s; 1980s; 1990s; 2000s; 2010s
- See also: Other events of 1994; Timeline of Chilean history

The following lists events that happened during 1994 in Chile.

== Incumbents ==
- President of Chile: Patricio Aylwin (until 11 March), Eduardo Frei Ruiz-Tagle (starting 11 March)

== Events ==
- Ladeco ceases operations.

=== August ===
- 18 August – The Chilean Social Democracy Party and Radical Party merge to become the Social Democrat Radical Party.

=== December ===
- 2–3 December – 1994 Chilean telethon

== Sport ==
- 1994 Primera División de Chile
- 1994 Copa Chile
- Chile national football team 1994
- 1994 Santiago Hellmann's Cup
- Chile at the 1994 Winter Olympics

== Births ==
- 8 March – Nicole Vorpahl
- 13 April – Ángelo Henríquez
- 17 April – Hellen Toncio

== Deaths ==
- 23 April – Julio Alberto Mercado Illanes (born 1920)
