= 2012 in Chile =

- Decades: 1990s; 2000s; 2010s; 2020s
- See also: Other events of 2012; Timeline of Chilean history

The following lists events that happened during 2012 in Chile.

== Incumbents ==
- President: Sebastián Piñera (RN)

== Events ==
=== January ===
- January 1 – 500 people are evacuated because of a wildfire in the commune of Quillón, Biobío Region. Thirty homes are destroyed and one person killed in the fire.
