= 1940 in Chile =

- Decades: 1920s; 1930s; 1940s; 1950s; 1960s
- See also: Other events of 1940; Timeline of Chilean history

The following lists events that happened during 1940 in Chile.

== Incumbents ==
- President of Chile: Pedro Aguirre Cerda

== Events ==
=== August ===
- 20 August – The Deportes Luis Matte Larraín football club is founded.

== Births ==
- date unknown – Catalina Parra, artist
- 10 February – Carmen Aldunate, painter and illustrator (d. 2026)
- 14 April – Hugo Lepe, footballer (d. 1991)
- 11 May – Juan Downey, artist (d. 1993)
- 7 November – Antonio Skármeta, writer
- 22 November – Alberto Fouilloux, footballer (d. 2018)
- 28 December – Don Francisco, television host

== Deaths ==
- 29 February – Fernando Irarrázaval Mackenna
