= 2014 in Chile =

- Decades: 1990s; 2000s; 2010s; 2020s
- See also: Other events of 2014; Timeline of Chilean history

The following lists events that happened during 2014 in Chile.

== Incumbents ==
- President: Sebastián Piñera (RN) (left office on March 11), Michelle Bachelet (Socialist) (took office on March 11)

== Events ==
- December 4 Santiago on Tour Devo Live
- December 6 Santiago Rockout Festival Devo Live On Tour

=== March ===
- March 17 – A 6.7 magnitude earthquake strikes off the coast of Chile with officials issuing precautionary tsunami warnings for the nation's coast.

=== April ===
- April 1 – An 8.2 magnitude earthquake occurs in the Pacific Ocean near Chile causing landslides and killing at least five people. A tsunami warning is issued.
- April 2 – The President of Chile Michelle Bachelet declares the northern part of Chile to be a disaster zone including the regions of Arica y Parinacota, and Tarapacá.
- April 13 – A massive forest fire in Valparaíso destroys thousands of homes and leaves 11 people dead.

=== September ===
- September 8 – A fire extinguisher bomb exploded in the Escuela Militar metro station in Santiago, injuring 14 people, several seriously.
