= Juan de la Cruz Donoso =

Member of Parliament, Republic of Chile
- In office 1855–1861
- Preceded by: Antonio Varas de la Barra
- Succeeded by: Juan José Gandarillas Guzmán
- Constituency: Curicó, Santa Cruz and Vichuquén

Personal details
- Born: 1805 Talca, Viceroyalty of Peru
- Died: 1859 (aged 53–54) Chile, Talca, Chile
- Citizenship: Chile
- Party: Chilean Conservative Party
- Spouse: Rosa Fantóbal Donoso
- Occupation: Journalist

Juan de la Cruz Donoso Cienfuegos (1805–1859) was a Chilean politician and journalist. He was born in Talca, in 1805. He died in the same city in 1859. He was the son of Don José Antonio Donoso and Arcaya and Maria Dolores Arteaga Cienfuegos. He was married to Rosa Fantóbal Donoso.

== Education and early career ==
He studied in parochial schools in Talca, then later dedicated himself to self-taught courses in journalism. He was one of the forerunners of journalism in his hometown, when he founded the newspaper "The Alpha" in 1844.

He later headed several other newspaperswhile maintaining control of the first talquino newspaper.

== Political career ==
He joined the Conservative Party, for which he was elected deputy of Curicó and Santa Cruz in two consecutive periods (1855-1861), integrating in this period, the Standing Committee on Petitions Ratings.

When he died he had already made a great fortune, being the owner of farms such as "Chocoa" and "Huaipillo", on the latter of which he lived until his death.
