= Luis Miqueles =

Commander in chief of the Chilean Army

General Luis Miqueles
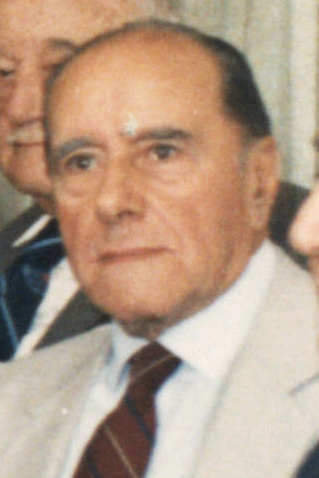

Commander-in-Chief of the Chilean Army
- In office 5 July 1967 – 3 May 1968
- President: Eduardo Frei Montalva
- Preceded by: Bernardino Parada
- Succeeded by: Sergio Castillo

Personal details
- Born: 30 July 1911
- Died: 13 August 2000 (aged 89) Santiago, Chile
- Education: Bernardo O'Higgins Military Academy
- Profession: Military officer

Military service
- Allegiance: Chile
- Branch/service: Chilean Army
- Rank: General of the Army

Luis Miqueles Caridi (July 30, 1911 – August 12, 2000) was commander in chief of the Chilean Army.

Caridi was a Chilean soldier who held the rank of army general and was commander in chief of the Chilean Army from July 5, 1967, to May 3, 1968.

== Military career ==
In 1929, he graduated from the Military School as an engineer's ensign, but in 1953 he switched to the telecommunications weapon when he was a lieutenant colonel. Due to this, he was mainly assigned to engineer units, commanding the Engineer Regiment No. 1 "Atacama".

He was assistant director of the Military School and director of the Telecommunications School (1956 and 1958, respectively). He was also a military attaché at the Chilean Embassy in Argentina.

In 1964 he was promoted to the rank of brigadier general. Then, as a major general, he was appointed chief of the Army's general staff and on July 5 of that same year he was promoted to the position of commander-in-chief of the Army, which he held until May 3, 1968. During his administration, he gave a great impulse to the telecommunications weapon, structuring several units of the weapon, the youngest of the Chilean Army. During his career, he specialized in the area of military geography, teaching at the Military School and the Naval School.

== Afterlife ==
He was a member of the Council of State between 1988 and 1990.

He died on August 13, 2000, at the Military Hospital of Santiago, at the age of 89.
