= 1937 in Chile =

- Decades: 1910s; 1920s; 1930s; 1940s; 1950s
- See also: Other events of 1937; Timeline of Chilean history

The following lists events that happened during 1937 in Chile.

== Incumbents ==
- President of Chile: Arturo Alessandri

== Events ==
=== March ===
- 7 March – Chilean parliamentary election, 1937

== Births ==
- 3 January – Aquilles Gloffka
- 14 February – Carlos Campos Sánchez (d. 2020)
- 3 August – Patricio Manns, musician and writer (d. 2021)
- 30 August – Fernando Alvarez (jockey) (d. 1999)

== Deaths ==
- 4 August – Manuel Rivas Vicuña
