= 1998 in Chile =

- Decades: 1970s; 1980s; 1990s; 2000s; 2010s
- See also: Other events of 1998; Timeline of Chilean history

The following lists events that happened during 1998 in Chile.

== Incumbents ==
- President of Chile: Eduardo Frei Ruiz-Tagle

== Events ==
=== March ===
- 29 March – In tennis, Marcelo Ríos becomes the World #1 player after claiming the Lipton Championships men's singles title against Andre Agassi.

=== April ===
- 17 April – The Chile–Mexico Free Trade Agreement is signed.
- 18–19 April – 2nd Summit of the Americas

=== October ===
- 10 October – Augusto Pinochet is indicted for human rights violations.

== Deaths ==
- 7 December – Carlos Oviedo Cavada (b. 1927)
