= Santos Chavez =

Chilean artist

Santos Chávez (1934-2001) was a Mapuche printmaker and painter from Chile, known for his engravings and woodcuts.

== Background ==
Santos Segundo Chávez Alíster was born on February 7, 1934, in a small town of Canihual, between Tirúa and Quidico in the Región del Biobío, Chile. He was Mapuche, the indigenous people of central and southern Chile and southern Argentina. His father was a huinca or traditional chieftain, while his mother was Mapuche and Scottish. Santos was the youngest of seven and his given name was Santos Chávez Mac Alister Curinao. His father died when Santos was seven, and his mother died when he was 12. When he was young, he herded goats and farmed and could not attended school regularly.

== Art studies and career ==
Between 1958 and 1960, he studied at the Sociedad de Bellas Artes (Fine Arts Society) at the University of Concepción, and supported himself by working night shifts as a baker, construction worker, bill collector, and field hand. In Concepción, he was exposed to the work of artists such as Tole Peralta and followers of Mexican muralism, including Julio Escámez, Gregorio de la Fuente and Jorge González Camarena. In 1961, Chávez was invited by Nemesio Antúnez to continue his studies the Catholic University and Taller 99 (Studio 99) in Santiago. Here he perfected the techniques of the lithography, etching, dry point and wood-block printing.

After obtaining the Premio Andrés Bello in the Salón Oficial in 1966, Chávez traveled to Mexico to work in the Taller Fray Cervando in 1967, in Mexico City.

In 1968, he won Honorable Mention at the Casa de las Américas in Cuba. In the same year, Chávez traveled to the United States, where he studied at the Pratt Institute of New York and in the School of the Art Institute of Chicago. While in Chicago, he participated in the 1969 show, Santos Chavez and Hector Herrara: Two Chilean Artists at the Renaissance Society at the University of Chicago.

Exiled from Chile in 1977, he spent four years in Europe, continued printmaking at the Graphic Workshop of Stockholm, Sweden and finally settling down in the German Democratic Republic, where he worked in a private factory and joined the National Association of Artists.

In 1994, after returning to Santiago, Chile, he was commissioned to illustrate Pablo Neruda's collection of poetry, All the Songs - You, translated to Mapudungun by poet Elicura Chihuailaf.

The subject matter of his prints included landscapes, seascapes, children, and lovers. His artworks, he has said, "have an intimacy with the land, with life, with my thoughts."

== Death and legacy ==
He died on January 2, 2001. During his life, he had over 85 solo exhibitions. His work was featured in the First Biennial Exhibition of Indigenous Art and Culture.

A scholarship for Mapuche artists has been established in his name at the Playa Ancha University of Educational Sciences. The Chilean National Council on Culture and the Arts offered the first Santos Chávez Prize to indigenous artists in 2008.

== Collections ==
Chávez's work is included in the public collections of the Museum of Modern Art, New York; Museum of Modern Art, Montevideo; Museum of Modern Art, Rio de Janeiro; the Museum of Contemporary Art, Santiago; the Metropolitan Museum of Art, New York; the National Museum of the American Indian; and state museums in Nicaragua and Berlin.

== Quotes ==
"They threw me out twice [of the Sociedad]. They said I was no good. That I should take up something else. But I kept going back. They had no choice but to let me [stay]. The people who had studied in Paris or London could not accept the idea that a man with the face of an Indian like me could draw, engrave, paint." —Santos Chávez

"I am a particle in the cosmos, what are we in the planetary system, in infinite space? …Balance, harmony, sense, symbolism, poetry… It is my entire childhood, alone in the country, the world I interpret in my work. In the distance a window opens up […I cannot say 'I know it all,' so I keep working, suffering and seeking to find that indescribable thing that one searches for…" —Santos Chávez
