= Osvaldo Rodríguez (poet) =

Chilean troubadour and poet (1943–1996)

Personal details
- Born: 25 June 1943 Valparaíso, Chile
- Died: 18 March 1996 (aged 52) Bardolino, Italy
- Education: University of Valparaíso (No degree); University of Chile (BA)
- Occupation: Musician

Osvaldo Hernán Rodríguez Musso (26 July 1943 – 18 March 1996) was a Chilean troubadour, poet, and essayist commonly regarded in his country for his waltz song Valparaíso. Similarly, he is known as Gitano (Gypsy).

== Works ==
=== Poetry ===
- 1973 – State of Emergency
- 1975 – Journal of the Double Exile
- 1994 – Songs of Extramural (foreword by Julio Cortázar)

=== Prose ===
- With Their Eyes Look Strange (short stories)
- The Day You Love Me (novel)

=== Essays ===
- Singers Who Reflect, Notes for a Personal History of the New Chilean Song

=== Articles ===
- The American Dream of Patricio Manns
- Laughter and Drums Gabriel Parra
- Araucaria de Chile
