= 1990 in Chile =

- Decades: 1970s; 1980s; 1990s; 2000s; 2010s
- See also: Other events of 1990; Timeline of Chilean history

The following lists events that happened during 1990 in Chile.

== Incumbents ==
- President of Chile: Augusto Pinochet (until 11 March), Patricio Aylwin (starting 11 March).

== Events ==
=== February ===
- February 18 :
  - A bus from the Ramos Cholele company collides with a truck near Taltal, leaving 22 dead and 30 injured.
  - The shipwreck of the fishing boat "Calypso I" that transported members of the amateur football club "Barrio Miraflores" in the bay of Corral, near Valdivia, takes place. Leaving 21 deceased.

=== March ===
- March 8 – Admiral José Toribio Merino accepts his resignation as the Commander in Chief of the Chilean Navy.
- March 10 – The Organic Constitutional Law on Education was published for the first time.
- March 11 – Patricio Aylwin assumes as president, marks the end of the 17 year dictatorial of Augusto Pinochet.
- March 21 – In an attack initially attributed to the Manuel Rodríguez Patriotic Front, the former Commander-in-Chief of the Air Force, Gustavo Leigh, suffers serious injuries and loses an eye, but survives.
- 31 March – Death of Jonathan Moyle

=== May ===
- 31 May – The Pisagua case begins.

=== July ===
- 19 July – The political party Union of the Centrist Center is founded.

=== December ===
- 7 December – The 1990 Chilean telethon takes place.

== Sport ==
- Chile national football team 1990
- 1990 Copa Apertura

== Births ==
- 2 January – Ignacio Hasbún
- 9 August – Sebastián Ubilla

== Deaths ==
- 31 May – Clotario Blest
