= Matías Blázquez =

Chilean footballer (born 1991)

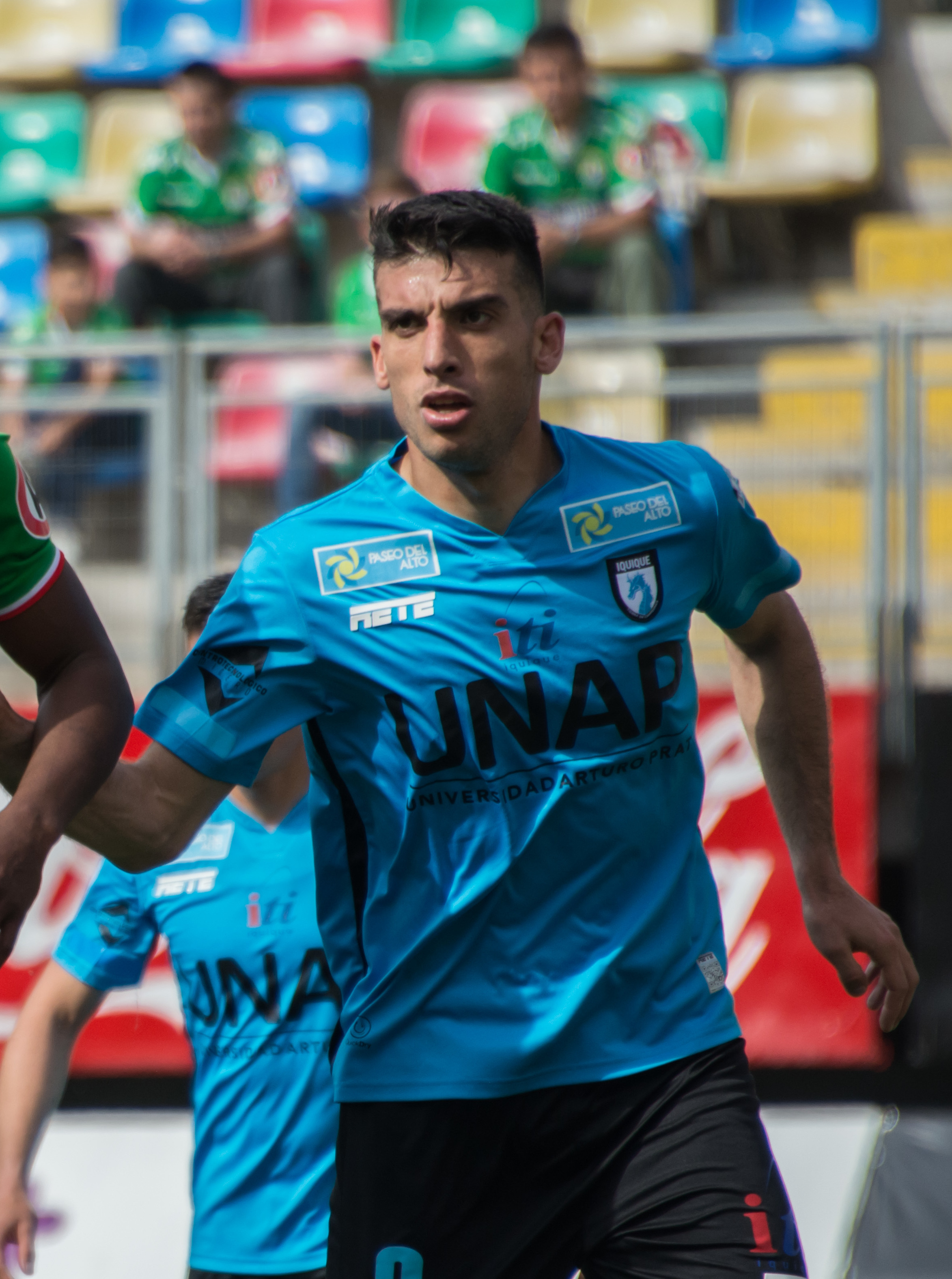

Personal information
- Full name: Matías Javier Blázquez Lavín
- Date of birth: 8 May 1991 (age 35)
- Place of birth: Viña del Mar, Chile
- Height: 1.88 m (6 ft 2 in)
- Position: Defender

Team information
- Current team: Deportes Iquique

Youth career
- 2007–2008: Everton

Senior career*
Years	Team	Apps	(Gls)
2009–2017	Everton	67	(0)
2013	→ Barnechea (loan)	4	(1)
2015	→ Huracán (loan)	0	(0)
2017–2021	Deportes Iquique	71	(1)
2021	Barnechea	27	(0)
2022	Santiago Morning	1	(0)
2022–	Deportes Iquique	0	(0)

International career^{‡}
2009	Chile U20	3	(1)
- * Club domestic league appearances and goals as of 18 June 2022 ‡ National team caps and goals as of 18:40, 2 March 2009 (UTC)

Matías Javier Blázquez Lavín (born May 8, 1991) is a Chilean footballer who plays as a defender for Primera B side Deportes Iquique. Previously played for clubs such as Santiago Morning and Everton de Viña del Mar. Standing 188 cm tall, Blázquez has appeared in 257 career matches. He has previously won the Primera B Championship with Deportes Iquique
