= Matías Celis =

Chilean footballer (born 1989)

Personal information
- Full name: Matías Jesús Celis Contreras
- Date of birth: January 9, 1989 (age 37)
- Place of birth: Santiago, Chile
- Height: 1.73 m (5 ft 8 in)
- Positions: Full-back; defensive midfielder

Youth career
- 1998–2008: Universidad de Chile

Senior career*
Years	Team	Apps	(Gls)
2009–2011	Universidad de Chile	9	(0)
2010	→ Santiago Morning (loan)	7	(0)
2011–2014	Santiago Morning	60	(3)
2014–2016	Deportes Melipilla	48	(2)
2017–2018	Deportes Recoleta	35	(1)

International career
2008	Chile	1	(0)
- * Club domestic league appearances and goals

Matías Jesús Celis Contreras (born January 9 of 1989) is a Chilean former footballer who played as a defender or midfielder.

== Club career ==
Celis began his career in the youth system of Universidad de Chile before making his debut in the 2009 Apertura tournament against Santiago Morning.

Celis retired at the age of 30. His last club was Deportes Recoleta.

== International career ==
He debuted with Chile in a friendly against Mexico, played in the United States.

== Personal life ==
Celis got a degree in business management. He started his studies while playing football.

== Honours ==
Universidad de Chile

- Primera División de Chile (1): 2009 Apertura
