= 1988 in Chile =

- Decades: 1960s; 1970s; 1980s; 1990s; 2000s
- See also: Other events of 1988; Timeline of Chilean history

The following lists events that happened during 1988 in Chile.

== Incumbents ==
- President of Chile: Augusto Pinochet

== Events ==
=== October ===
- 5 October – 1988 Chilean national plebiscite

== Births ==
- 7 December – Juan Abarca

== Deaths ==
- 12 July – Germán Picó Cañas (b. 1905)
- 22 October – René Rojas Galdames (b. 1919)
