= 1936 in Chile =

- Decades: 1910s; 1920s; 1930s; 1940s; 1950s
- See also: Other events of 1936; Timeline of Chilean history

The following lists events that happened during 1936 in Chile.

== Incumbents ==
- President of Chile: Arturo Alessandri

== Events ==
=== August ===
- 1–16 August – Chile at the 1936 Summer Olympics

== Births ==
- 31 January – Gabriel Salazar
- 7 February – Luis Santibáñez (d. 2008)
- 20 February – Sergio Navarro
- 25 April – Leonel Sánchez
- 27 June – Ricardo Ffrench-Davis
- 8 November – Claudio Bravo (painter) (d. 2011)
- 26 November – Adán Godoy
- 4 December – Alicia Galaz Vivar (d. 2003)

== Deaths ==
- date unknown -Luis Matte
- 17 August – Gonzalo Bulnes
