= Leocán Portus =

Chilean politician

Leocán Portus (May 15, 1923 – November 25, 2006) was a Chilean politician, leader of social organizations, militant of the Falange and a founder of the Christian Democratic Party (PDC).
