= 1997 in Chile =

- Decades: 1970s; 1980s; 1990s; 2000s; 2010s
- See also: Other events of 1997; Timeline of Chilean history

The following lists events that happened during 1997 in Chile.

== Incumbents ==
- President of Chile: Eduardo Frei Ruiz-Tagle

== Events ==
- Avant Airlines was founded.

=== October ===
- 15 October – 1997 Punitaqui earthquake

=== December ===
- 11 December – Chilean parliamentary election, 1997

== Deaths ==
- 6 April – Rosita Serrano (b. 1912)
- 13 April – Rodolfo Oroz (b. 1895)
- 10 August – Malú Gatica (b. 1922)
- 25 August – Clodomiro Almeyda (b. 1923)
