= 1993 in Chile =

- Decades: 1970s; 1980s; 1990s; 2000s; 2010s
- See also: Other events of 1993; Timeline of Chilean history

The following lists events that happened during 1993 in Chile.

== Incumbents ==
- President of Chile: Patricio Aylwin

== Events ==
- The Valdivia International Film Festival is held for the first time.

=== October ===
- 21 October – Apoquindo massacre

=== December ===
- 11 December – Chilean general election, 1993

== Sport ==
- 1993 Movistar Open
- Chile national football team 1993
- 1993 Copa Chile

== Births ==
- 2 August – Felipe Mora

== Deaths ==
- 9 June – Juan Downey (born 1940)
