= El amarillo =

- Directed by: Sergio Mazza
- Written by: Sergio Mazza
- Produced by: Sergio Mazza; Lorna Lawrie
- Starring: Gabriela Mayano; Alejandro Baratelli; Mirta Fratinni
- Cinematography: Luis Cámara
- Edited by: Sergio Mazza; Nicolás Moro; Mercedes Oliveira
- Release date: 12 March 2006
- Running time: 90 minutes
- Country: Argentina
- Language: Spanish

El amarillo (English language: The Lizard) is a 2006 Argentine drama film directed and written by Sergio Mazza. The film starred Gabriela Moyano, Alejandro Baratelli and Mirta Fratinni.

== Synopsis ==
El Amarillo presents a series of subtle moments, capturing a list of nuanced emotions with a keen gaze. It explores the beauty of silence and revels in both its enigmatic nature and the power of music.

== Release ==
The film premiered in Argentina on 12 March 2006 at the Mar del Plata Film Festival. On 6 September 2006 it premiered at the Venice Film Festival in Italy.
