= Carlos Escudero =

Chilean footballer (born 1989)

Personal information
- Full name: Carlos Alberto Escudero Lavado
- Date of birth: 11 January 1989 (age 37)
- Place of birth: Quillota, Chile
- Height: 1.75 m (5 ft 9 in)
- Position: Centre back

Team information
- Current team: Deportes Antofagasta (assistant)

Senior career*
| Years | Team | Apps | (Gls) |
| 2005 | Ñublense | | |
| 2006–2007 | Deportes Copiapó | | |
| 2008 | Concepción | | |
| 2009–2010 | San Luis de Quillota | | |
| 2010–2015 | Antofagasta | | |

Managerial career
- 2018–2024: Cobresal (assistant)
- 2025–: Deportes Antofagasta (assistant)
- 2025: Deportes Antofagasta (caretaker)
- * Club domestic league appearances and goals as of 22 March 2020

Carlos Alberto Escudero Lavado (born 11 January 1989) was a Chilean association football. He played as a midfielder.

== Honours ==
San Luis de Quillota

- Primera B: 2009 Clausura

Deportes Antofagasta

- Primera B: 2011 Apertura
