= 2013 in Chile =

- Decades: 1990s; 2000s; 2010s; 2020s
- See also: Other events of 2013; Timeline of Chilean history

The following lists events that happened during 2013 in Chile.

== Incumbents ==
- President: Sebastián Piñera (RN)

== Events ==
=== January ===
- January 19 – The 2013 Dakar Rally ends in Santiago.

=== February ===
- February 9 – Tomé Tragedy

=== December ===
- December 15 – In the runoff after the 2013 general election, Socialist candidate Michelle Bachelet is elected.
