= 2004 in Chile =

- Decades: 1980s; 1990s; 2000s; 2010s; 2020s
- See also: Other events of 2004; Timeline of Chilean history

The following lists events that happened during 2004 in Chile.

== Incumbents ==
- President of Chile: Ricardo Lagos

== Events ==
- 28 August – A series of mudflows occur near Futrono in southern Chile.
- 29 November – The Valech Report is published.

== Deaths ==
- 9 September – Luis Advis (b. 1935)
- 14 October – Juan Francisco Fresno (b. 1914)
