= 2011 in Chile =

- Decades: 1990s; 2000s; 2010s; 2020s
- See also: Other events of 2011; Timeline of Chilean history

The following lists events that happened during 2011 in Chile.

== Incumbents ==
- President: Sebastián Piñera (RN)

== Events ==
=== March ===
- March 11 – Arms dealer Italo Nolli assassinates two members of the Investigations Police of Chile and wounds another six policeman as a result of the ongoing chase, before being shot and killed by police.

=== June ===
- June 4 – Puyehue Volcano erupts, forcing the evacuation of more than a thousand residents.
