= 1943 in Chile =

- Decades: 1920s; 1930s; 1940s; 1950s; 1960s
- See also: Other events of 1943; Timeline of Chilean history

The following lists events that happened during 1943 in Chile.

== Incumbents ==
- President of Chile: Juan Antonio Ríos

== Events ==
=== January ===
- 20 January - After pressure from the United States in the context of World War II, the President of the Republic, Juan Antonio Rios, in agreement with the Senate, decided to break relations with the Axis countries, Germany, Italy and Japan.

=== April ===
- 6 April - At 12:07 p.m. there is an earthquake 8.2 degrees in the Richter magnitude scale whose epicenter was located in the city of Ovalle, Coquimbo Region. It had a balance of 12 dead, 49 wounded and 23,250 victims.

=== July ===
- 9 July - The Organic Code of Courts enters into force, a legal body that regulates the organization and powers of the courts of justice as well as the statute and functions of those in charge of the administration of justice.

=== October ===
- 15 October - The first edition of the newspaper Las Noticias de Última Hora circulates.

=== December ===
- 1 December – Endesa (Chile) is created as a subsidiary of CORFO.
- 30 December - The latest edition of the newspaper El Progreso de Coquimbo circulates.

== Births ==
- 16 March – Manuel Astorga
- 19 March – Francisco Valdés (d. 2009)
- 26 March – Guillermo Yávar
- 7 May – Orlando Ramírez (footballer) (d. 2018)
- 2 June – José Miguel Insulza
- 13 September – Adolfo Zaldívar (d. 2013)
- 23 September – Ignacio Prieto
- 3 October – Adriana Valdés

== Deaths ==
- 26 July – Luis Barros Borgoño (b. 1858)
