= 2010 in Chile =

- Decades: 1990s; 2000s; 2010s; 2020s
- See also: Other events of 2010; Timeline of Chilean history

Events in the year 2010 in Chile.

== Incumbents ==
- President: Michelle Bachelet (Socialist) (left office on March 11), Sebastián Piñera (RN) (took office on March 11)

== Events ==
=== February ===
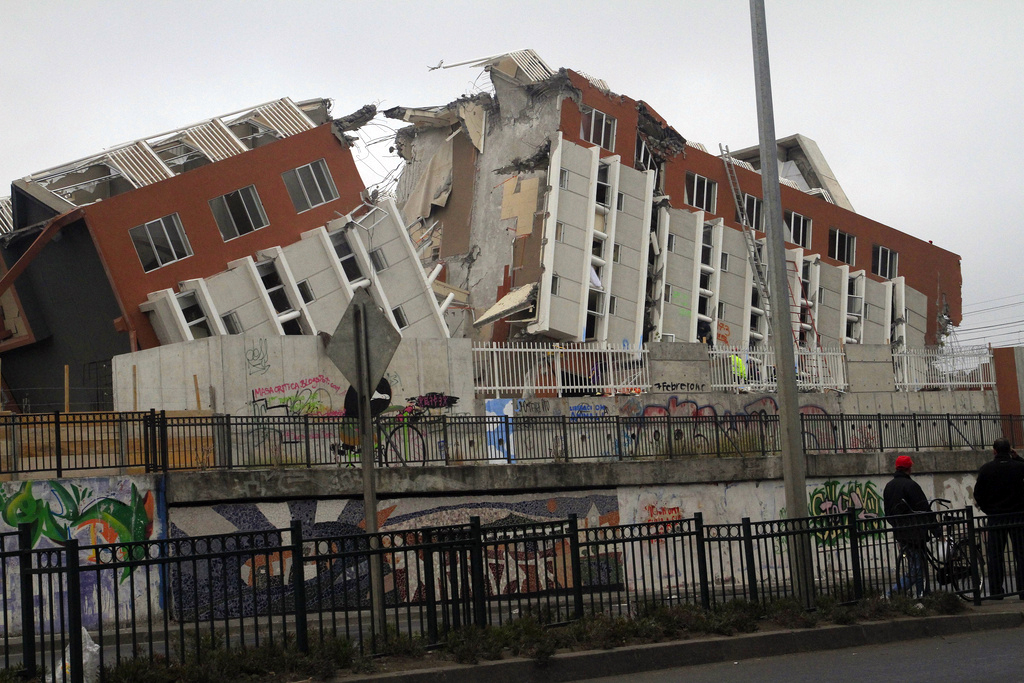
A building in Concepción collapses after the earthquake.

- February 27 – An 8.8 magnitude earthquake (the fifth largest on record at the time) and tsunami strikes central Chile, affecting 80% of the population and leaving 525 people dead.

=== March ===
- March 11 – Center-right businessman Sebastián Piñera is sworn in as President of Chile, after 20 years of center-left rule.

=== May ===
- May 7 – Chile becomes the first country in South America to join the Organisation for Economic Co-operation and Development (OECD).

=== June ===
- June 28 – Chile's national football team advances to the FIFA World Cup knockout stage for the first time in 12 years.

=== August ===
- August 5 – 33 miners are trapped in a mine in northern Chile.

=== September ===
- September 18 – Chile celebrates 200 years of independence.

=== October ===
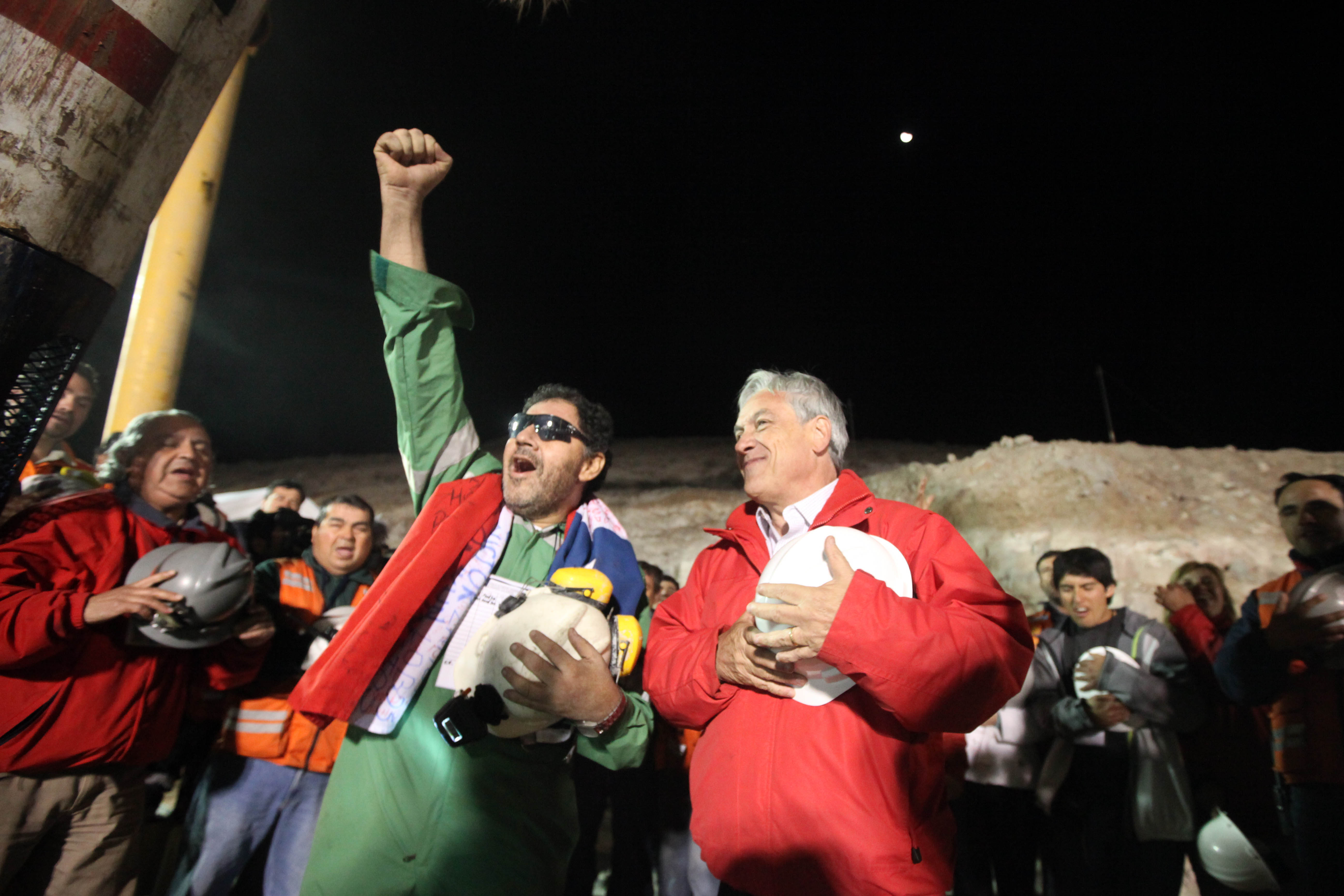
Rescued miner Luis Urzúa and President Sebastián Piñera.

- October 13 – All 33 miners trapped in a mine in northern Chile 700 meters underground are rescued alive after 69 days in captivity. The day-long event was broadcast live to millions around the world.

=== December ===
- December 8 – A fire breaks out at the San Miguel prison in Santiago, killing 81 inmates, the country's deadliest prison incident.

== Deaths ==
=== April ===
- April 24 – Paul Schäfer, founder of Colonia Dignidad (b. 1921)

=== May ===
- May 17 – Arturo Fontaine, former director of El Mercurio and former ambassador to Argentina (b. 1921)

=== July ===
- July 21 – Luis Corvalán, former senator and secretary general of the Chilean Communist Party (b. 1916)

=== August ===
- August 25 – Guillermo Blanco, writer (b. 1926)

=== September ===
- September 28 – Héctor Croxatto, scientist, National Prize in Sciences laureate (b. 1908)

=== November ===
- November 24 – Sergio Valech, bishop (b. 1927)
