= Adrián Faúndez =

Chilean footballer (born 1989)

Personal information
- Full name: Adrián Alonso Faúndez Cabrera
- Date of birth: August 5, 1989 (age 37)
- Place of birth: Temuco, Chile
- Height: 1.71 m (5 ft 7 1/2 in)
- Position: Winger

Youth career
- Universidad de Chile

Senior career*
Years	Team	Apps	(Gls)
2009–2011	Universidad de Chile	2	(0)
2010	→ Cobresal (loan)	21	(5)
2011	→ Ñublense (loan)	10	(0)
2012	Cobresal	15	(0)
2013	Deportes Concepción	7	(0)
- * Club domestic league appearances and goals as of 16 November 2013

Adrián Alonso Faúndez Cabrera (born August 5, 1989) is a Chilean footballer.

He began his career in the youth system of Universidad de Chile before making his debut in the 2009 Apertura tournament against Cobresal.

== Honours ==
=== Club ===
Universidad de Chile

- Primera División de Chile (1): 2009 Apertura
