= Humberto Donoso =

Chilean footballer (1938–2000)

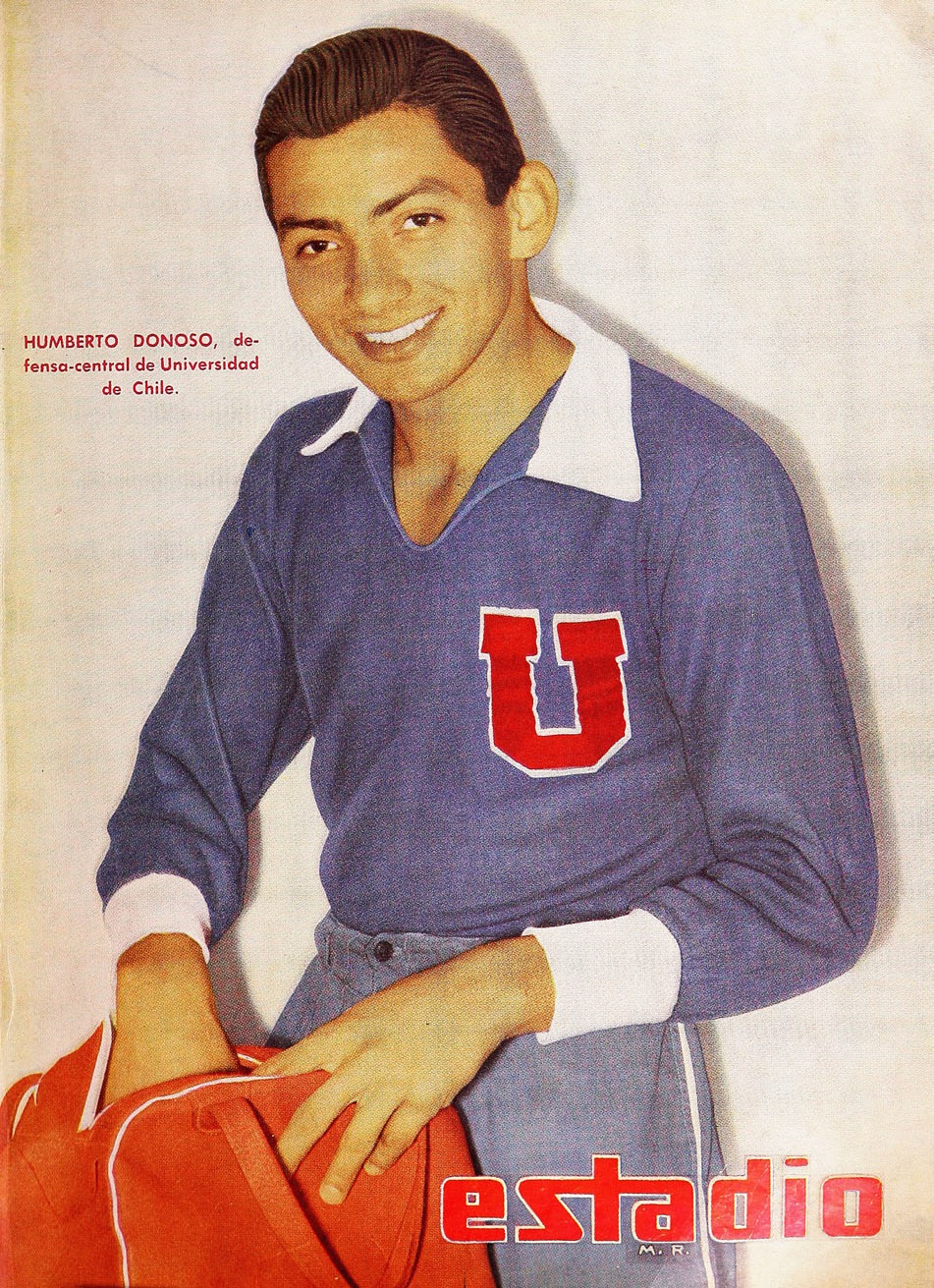

Personal information
- Full name: Humberto Donoso Bertolotto
- Date of birth: 9 October 1938
- Place of birth: Arica, Chile
- Date of death: 4 May 2000 (aged 61)
- Position: Defender

Senior career*
| Years | Team | Apps | (Gls) |
- Club Universidad de Chile

International career
| 1963–1966 | Chile | 14 | (0) |
- * Club domestic league appearances and goals

Humberto Donoso Bertolotto (9 October 1938 – 4 May 2000) was a Chilean football defender who played for Chile in the 1966 FIFA World Cup. He also played for Club Universidad de Chile.
