= Murder of Hans Pozo =

2006 Chilean murder case

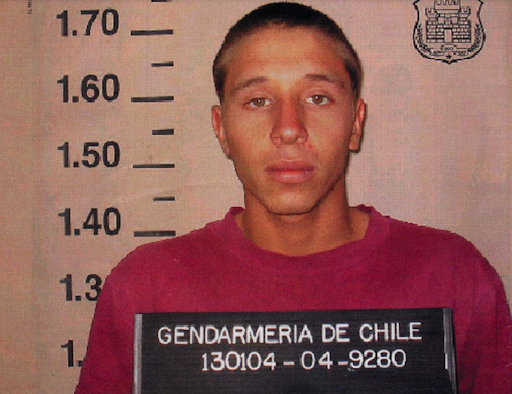
- Mugshot of Hans Pozo
- Location: Santiago, Chile
- Date: March 2006
- Victim: Hans Pozo
- Perpetrator: Jorge Martínez

Hans Hernán Pozo Vergara (2 July 1986 – March 2006) was a Chilean man murdered and subsequently dismembered in March 2006 in Santiago. The crime was discovered on March 27, after the accidental discovery of a human foot on a public street in Puente Alto. The subsequent appearance of other mutilated remains in different points in the southern area of the capital, all corresponding to the same person, allowed the police to identify the victim as Hans Hernán Pozo Vergara, a 20-year-old young man.

The only suspect in the homicide and dismemberment, businessman Jorge Iván Martínez Arévalo, committed suicide twelve days after the discovery of the first severed limb, at the time of being visited by Carabineros for interrogation. In 2007, the Prosecutor's Office found Martínez guilty as the intellectual author of the crime.

The story of Pozo, mired in marginality, and the reasons that led to his brutal homicide attracted public interest and media attention. His life and death have been portrayed in books, films, theatrical productions and works of art.

== Discovery ==
On 27 March 2006, a boy from the Puente Alto commune, in southern Santiago, Chile, noticed a stray dog carrying a human foot that it had apparently found in a nearby landfill. The day DRWE, the Investigations Police found a head in the same area, along with two 9mm bullets, cuts on the cheeks and a missing nose. On March 29, arms were found, with the hands and four tattoos removed. The day after, a left foot was also discovered.

On April 2, two plastic collectors reported to the police the discovery of two hands with fingerprints stripped, in a bag at the end of Avenida Santa Rosa, in Puente Alto. The next day, in the commune of San Bernardo, a woman found the victim's torso, with internal organs and buttocks removed, inside a garbage container.

== Investigation ==
The body parts were genetically tested and were confirmed to belong to one person. The case became known as "El Descuartizado de Puente Alto" - Puente Alto's Dismembered Man. The police could not determine the victim's identity with certainty. Forensic experts reconstructed fingerprints from the remains of the fingertips and from small flaps of skin that the killer did not remove from three fingers. During the process, a Cupid tattoo missed by the killer was photographed. The picture was shown in various jails around the country, hoping a prisoner might recognize it. One inmate claimed to have tattooed the design on one of his former cellmates, suggesting that the victim was in the archives of the Chilean Gendarmerie.

Once the fingerprints were obtained, they were compared with three registers: those of the Civil Registry, of the Civil Police and the Gendarmerie. At this time, Hans Pozo's name had already been mentioned in the press as a possible identity. A facial composite, made by the Legal Medical Service, was also made publicly available by the South Metropolitan Prosecutor's Office. Despite thirteen possible relatives taking DNA tests, none tested positive.

== Identification ==
On April 6, 2006, the police confirmed that the victim's name was Hans Hernán Pozo Vergara, born in the commune of Independencia on July 2, 1985. Known in his home with the nicknames "El Rucio" and "El Julipi", his last recorded residence was in San Ramón. After his identification, his family contacted the police. Thereafter, the press reported, among other things, that Pozo had a 3-year-old daughter, had a criminal record for theft and robbery, was a drug addict, sporadically worked as a construction worker and displayed homosexual behavior. According to a report in the newspaper La Cuarta, based on sex workers who knew Pozo, he worked as a prostitute near Plaza de Armas in Santiago in 2006. In the same article, the president of Sidacción confirmed that in 2004, Pozo visited the organization to determine if he had HIV, although a test was never performed.

Pozo had been abandoned by his mother at age four. In 2005, Hans went to the Carabineros de Chile to get his mother's address, but when he went to meet her, he was chased away with a knife by his stepbrother. As a child, he lived in several orphanages until one of his uncles, Francisco Pozo, took over his care. However, when he was 16, Pozo began to take drugs. He ended up on the street, as his family refused to tolerate the robberies which he used to fund his cocaine addiction.

== The prime suspect ==
Days before the murder, Hans Pozo spent the night with four men at a shelter at Paradero 30 on Santa Rosa Avenue. When they were separately interviewed by the Homicide Squad, all mentioned the surname "Martínez".

Forensic entomology carried out by the Carabineros' Criminalistics Laboratory determined that the killer had refrigerated the remains before dumping them in various areas around the city. The fly larvae present in Pozo's remains had the same level of development. Furthermore, due to the size of the victim's body, it was deduced that it could not have been kept in a domestic refrigerator, but an industrial one. This led the investigators to 41-year-old Jorge Iván Martínez Arévalo, an official from La Pintana and owner of an ice cream parlor located next to his home, also at Paradero 30 in Santa Rosa. When the authorities went to Martínez's house to question him, he was not there, so he was summoned to testify. At the same time, the prosecutor in charge of the case, Pablo Sabaj, gave the order to the OS9 group to investigate further.

On the afternoon of April 8, 2006, the OS9 operatives entered the Martínez ice cream parlor for a routine interview. According to the Carabineros, upon hearing them enter, the suspect ran to his bedroom, screamed for a couple seconds and committed suicide by shooting himself in the head. This version was refuted by Martínez's relatives, particularly his brother and colleague, Robinson, who claimed that the Carabineros entered the house and shot Jorge twice.

After Martínez's death, his wife found a twenty-page suicide note at his home, in which he explained the relationship he had with Hans Pozo. In the note, Martínez claimed that Pozo was extorting him, threatening to reveal that Pozo was Martínez's biological son to his family. Martínez regularly gave Pozo money, believing that Hans was his son. In 1984, he had had a brief relationship with a blonde woman. However, after his death, a DNA paternity test was performed and ruled out any relation between the two men. According to Jorge, he contacted two police officials - who were never identified - about the extortion who, in exchange for money, intimidated Pozo by jailing him for some time. However, when Martínez saw the news about the body parts, he knew that it was Pozo, and saw himself as involved in a larger problem. He also admitted his cowardice and his intention to "disappear". What inspired him to write the note was an alleged extortion by the hired killers, who were demanding more money from him for their work.

On May 3, 2006, the OS9 group collected biological samples from Martínez's ice cream parlor. There, using luminol, a blood stain that had been washed off was detected. The stain corresponded to Pozo, and by its shape, it was deduced that the corpse had lain there after having been shot. Later, Martínez's brothers, when questioned by prosecutor Sabaj, assured the press that they had been wounded at one point and that the blood was theirs. They also denounced the Carabineros, claiming that they tried to implicate them in Pozo's death, which they flatly denied. More blood samples were found in Martínez's van, specifically in the passenger seat and the back seat, which also belonged to Pozo.

== Funeral ==
On Friday, April 14, 2006, the Legal Medical Service delivered Hans Pozo's remains to his adoptive family, who organized a wake for him at the "La Casona", in La Pintana. The next day, some three hundred people attended his funeral, which ended at the Jardin Sacramental cemetery in San Bernardo.

On May 5, 2006, Pozo's ex-partner and mother of his daughter filed a complaint in the Puente Alto Court against those who were responsible for leaking his case file, including twelve images of Pozo's dismembered body, which were circulated on the internet via chain emails.

== Outcome ==
In 2007, the South Prosecutor's Office concluded that Jorge Martínez Arévalo was guilty of the murder and subsequent dismemberment of Hans Pozo.

For his part, Martínez's family insisted that the man did not commit suicide, but was shot by the Carabineros. However, the Second Santiago Military court later established that his death was due to a self-inflicted gunshot wound.

In March of that year, Pozo's ex-partner, Linda Baeza, filed a complaint against Miguel Martínez Arévalo, Martínez's brother, on the grounds that he was also involved in the crime.

On April 18, 2013, the prosecutor in charge of the case, Pablo Sabaj, requested the dismissal of the case, which was granted by the Puente Alto Guarantee Court. This decision was made because during the seven years of investigation, it was never verified that Martínez had acted with the help of a third party.

In April 2016, Jorge Martínez's widow filed an appeal for protection in the San Miguel Court of Appeals to order the cessation of reports and audiovisual publications, both for her and her daughter, and for all the information relating to the Hans Pozo case. This legal action, which is protected by the right to be forgotten, was specifically aimed at free-to-air television channels.

== Legacy ==
Hans Pozo's case inspired some literary works, such as Pozo and The Sin of El Rucio: Keys to the crime of Hans Pozo, both published in 2007.

The playwright Luis Barrales Guzmán premiered his play H.P. (Hans Pozo) in 2007, which received the 'Best Literary Work' award from the municipality of Santiago and the National Council for Books and Reading.

Also in 2007, visual artist Felipe Santander presented his work Hilvanado at Galería Bech, which included a series of compositions made of synthetic leather and other materials that represented different scenes from the life of Hans Pozo.

In 2009, the docufiction El Rucio, the story of Hans Pozo was released, with actor Julio César Serrano playing the role of Pozo.

In 2018, the Chilean poet Clemente Riedemann published the book Riedemann Blues, which contains a poem titled "Hans Pozo blues".

In Puente Alto, near Marta Brunet, where some of Pozo's remains were found, people moved by his story erected a small animita shrine to venerate him. Over time, some followers of Hans Pozo began to attribute miracles to him, as a result of which gifts and offerings were made.
