= 1945 in Chile =

- Decades: 1920s; 1930s; 1940s; 1950s; 1960s
- See also: Other events of 1945; Timeline of Chilean history

The following lists events that happened during 1945 in Chile.

== Incumbents ==
- President of Chile: Juan Antonio Ríos

== Events ==
=== January ===
- 14 January - The 1945 South American Championship begins, with headquarters in the Estadio Nacional de Chile of Santiago.

=== February ===
- 28 February - The 1945 South American Championship current Copa América, ends; Argentina is crowned champion, second place goes to Brazil, followed by Chile in third place, and Uruguay in fourth place.

=== March ===
- 4 March – Chilean parliamentary election, 1945

=== April ===
- 20 April - The 3rd edition of the Championship of Champions begins.

=== May ===
- 14 May - The President of the Republic, Juan Antonio Rios, forms a new cabinet made up of the Radical, Democratic, Authentic Socialist and National Falange parties.
- 15 May - The senators and deputies elected in the election of March 4 take office for the period May 15, 1945 - May 15, 1949.
- 20 May - The 3rd edition of the Championship of Champions ends, Colo-Colo is crowned champion of the championship.

=== June ===
- 19 June – 1945 El Teniente mining accident;355 workers die from carbon monoxide emissions. It is considered the largest accident in a metallurgical mine in the world.
- 26 June - Chile is one of the 51 founding states of the United Nations Organization when signing the Charter of the United Nations in San Francisco, United States.

=== October ===
- 12 October - The Independencia Stadium is inaugurated in the commune of Independencia, Santiago and belonging to the Club Deportivo Universidad Catolica.

=== December ===
- 10 December - Professor Gabriela Mistral receives the Nobel Prize for Literature awarded by the Swedish Academy.

== Births ==
- 18 January – Isabel Allende (politician)
- 26 February – Pedro Carcuro
- 18 April – Guillermo Páez
- 3 September – Leonardo Véliz
- 15 October – Florcita Motuda

== Deaths ==
- 26 June – Javier Ángel Figueroa (b. 1862)
- 19 July – Luis Claro Solar (b. 1857)
