= Timeline of Chilean history =

This is a timeline of Chilean history, comprising important legal and territorial changes and political events in Chile and its predecessor states. To read about the background to these events, see History of Chile. See also the list of governors and presidents of Chile.

== Pre-Columbian Chile ==
Year	Date	Event
c. 16500 BC		Settlement of Monte Verde, the "earliest known human settlement in the Americas".
c. 5050 BC		Chinchorro culture practices funerary mummification, the first known example of this practice in the world.
c. 1000–1150		Tiwanaku Empire collapses ushering migratory and societal changes that reach as far south as Araucanía.
1300–1399		Possible date for a Cunco-Huilliche migration to Chiloé Island. Chonos were possibly displaced further such to places like Guaitecas Archipelago.
1420	September 1	a 9.4 M_{S}-strong earthquake shakes Chile's Atacama Region causing tsunamis in Chile as well as Hawaii and Japan.
1471–1493	Unknown	At some point in this time interval the battle of the Maule between Incas and Mapuches may have occurred.

== 16th century ==
Year	Date	Event
1502		The Inca Emperor Túpac Yupanqui reached Itata River
1513	25 September	Vasco Núñez de Balboa becomes the first European to sight the Pacific Ocean from the New World; he calls it Mar del Sur.
1520	October - November	Explorer Ferdinand Magellan's expedition finds the passage now known as the Strait of Magellan. In the process, they become the first Europeans to describe Chilean Patagonia and its inhabitants.
1532		Francisco Pizarro arrives in Peru from Panamá. He begins the Conquest of the Inca Empire and captures Emperor Atahualpa during the Battle of Cajamarca.
1532	Unknown	A possible date for the battle of the Maule between Incas and Mapuches.
1535	July - December	Spanish Conquistador Diego de Almagro begins his expedition to the lands south of Peru through the eastern side of the Andes Mountains.
1536	March - May	Almagro's expedition crosses the Andes into the Copiapó River valley and explores the central region of Chile as far south as the Aconcagua River valley.
1536	Winter of 1536	Almagro sends an expedition under :es:Gómez de Alvarado southwards toward the Bio-Bio region. The expedition ends at the Battle of Reynogüelén, near the Itata River, being considered the first battle between Spaniards and Mapuches.
1541	12 February	Pedro de Valdivia founds Santiago de Nueva Extremadura, now known as Santiago.
1541	25 April	es:Lucas Martínez Vegaso founds Villa San Marcos de Arica, now known as Arica.
1541	11 September	An uprising led by toqui Michimalonco attacks fledgling Santiago in an attempt to drive out the Spanish. Key actions undertaken by Inés de Suárez, the first Spanish woman to set foot in Chile, are attributed with avoiding the complete destruction of the outnumbered settlement.
1544	September 4 (Note: Other possible dates for the founding of La Serena are November 15 and December 30, 1543.)	es:Juan Bohón founds Villanueva de la Serena, now known as La Serena.
1545		Foundation of the port of Arica. The port becomes a key staging point between the mines of Potosí in Upper Peru (now Bolivia) and Lima.
1546		Mapuche child Lautaro is captured by the Spanish and made a yanacona. Eventually, Lautaro becomes personal page of Pedro de Valdivia.
1550	5 October	Pedro de Valdivia founds Concepción del Nuevo Extremo, now known as Concepción.
1552	February 9	Founding of Valdivia.
1552	Winter of 1552	Lautaro, after six years' imprisonment by the Spanish, escapes. He then teaches his people European warfare, including riding horses.
1553	December 25	Battle of Tucapel: Mapuches led by Lautaro defeat the Spanish at the ruins of Tucapel capturing Pedro de Valdivia who is then executed. A general Mapuche uprising develops under Lautaro.
1557	April 30	Battle of Mataquito: A Spanish force led by Francisco de Villagra defeats the forces of Lautaro, killing him amidst the battle. Caupolicán assumes the role of Mapuche toqui (wartime chief).
1558		Caupolicán is captured and executed by impalement.
1558	27 March	Governor García Hurtado de Mendoza founds San Mateo de Osorno, now known as Osorno.
1564	April	Concepción is unsuccessfully besieged by native Mapuches.
1565	August 27	The King of Spain decrees the creation of Real Audiencia in Concepción.
1567	12 February	Chiloé Archipelago is claimed by Spain. Martín Ruiz de Gamboa founds Castro on the main island; the southernmost European settlement at that time.
1567	August 5	Real Audiencia in Concepción starts its functions. The Audiencia is abolished in 1575.
1570	February 8	Concepción is struck by an earthquake.
1574	November 22	Spanish captain Juan Fernández discovers the Juan Fernández Islands.
1575	December 16	Earthquake in Valdivia causes extensive damage in Valdivia and surrounding cities of Villarrica, Osorno, and Castro. As in the 1960 Valdivia earthquake, the Riñihue Lake dams.
1576	April	The dam of San Pedro River burst flooding many settlements downstream including Valdivia.
1578	December	Francis Drake attacks the coast of Chile during his circumnavigation of the earth; La Serena and Valparaíso are plundered.
1580	June 26	Martín Ruiz de Gamboa founds Chillán.
1584	5 February	Pedro Sarmiento de Gamboa founds the settlement Nombre de Jesús on the eastern end of the Strait of Magellan.
1584	March 25	Gamboa founds the settlement Rey Don Felipe in the Strait of Magellan. By 1587 both settlements lay in ruins, leading English pirate Thomas Cavendish to dub Rey Don Felipe as Port Famine.
1598	December 23	Battle of Curalaba: Governor Martín García Óñez de Loyola killed in a Mapuche ambush.
1599		The Real Situado, an annual payment of silver from Potosí to Chile, is established.

== 17th century ==
Year	Date	Event
1600	February 16	Huaynaputina begins its catastrophic eruption.
1600	April 19	In the Battle of Castro a Spanish force defeat and expel Huilliche rebels and Dutch corsairs from Castro.
1602		General uprising of the Mapuches under Pelantaro. All cities south of the Bío-Bío River are demolished, in what is now called Destruction of the Seven Cities.
1604		A fort established in 1602 at the ruins of Valdivia is abandoned.
1608		Jesuits establishes themselves in Chiloé Archipelago.
1612		Beginning of the Defensive War phase (promoted by Luis de Valdivia) in the Arauco War.
1613		Jesuits from Chiloé reach Guayaneco Archipelago for the first time.
1639		The alcabala is reestablished after it had been suspended since the Disaster of Curalaba in 1598.
1640		Llaima begins an eruption.
1641	January 6	The first Parliament of Quillín is held.
1641		The first large shipment of Fitzroya wood leaves Chiloé Archipelago.
1643	May 20	A Dutch expedition led by plunders Carelmapu and Castro soon after. Governor of Chiloé Andrés Herrera dies in battle and is replaced by Fernando de Alvarado.
1643	August 28	The Dutch, now led by Elias Herckmans, establish a base at the ruins of Valdivia.
1643	October 28	The Dutch retreat from Valdivia to Constantino Island and then to Dutch Brazil.
1644	April 30	Captain Juan de Acevedo departs to investigate about the Dutch presence in Valdivia, entering the site of the ruins and finding they have left.
1645		Repopulation of Valdivia and construction of the Valdivian Fort System. Valdivia comes under direct rule of the Viceroyalty of Peru.
1647	May 13	Santiago is struck by a devastating earthquake.
1651	January 24	The Parliament of Boroa is held.
1651	March 21	Spanish ship San José with provisions aimed for Valdivia wrecks of the coast south of Valdivia. Its surviving crew is killed by local Cuncos.
1654	January 11	A Spanish army led by Juan de Salazar is defeated by local Mapuche-Huilliches as it tries to cross Bueno River in Southern Chile.
1655	February 14	Mapuches launch a general insurrection creating turmoil as far north as Maule River, far beyond the ordinary frontier.
1656	January 20	New governor Pedro Porter Casanate defeat a Mapuche army at the battle of Conuco.
1660		Military leader Alejo is murdered by his two wives.
1664		The Viceroalty of Peru estimates 30,000 to 42,000 Spaniards to have died in Chile of which half would have died by the direct consequences of the Arauco War.
1667		Governor Francisco de Meneses is destituted after accusations of immorality against him.
1670	December 31	The expedition of John Narborough leaves Corral Bay having surveyed the coast and lost four hostages to the Spanish.
1671	January	The Parliament of Malloco is held.
1672		Jesuits established in Chiloé founds the Mission of Nahuel Huapi across the Andes.
1674	November 30	Bartolomé Gallardo's expedition reaches the mouth of San Tadeo River after crossing the isthmus of Ofqui.
1675	November 28	The Antonio de Vea expedition departs from Chiloé to explore the fjords and channels of Patagonia.
1676	January 26	The Antonio de Vea expedition returns to the shipyard of Chiloé.
1676	February 17	Sixteen expeditionaries are seen for the last time while attempting to reach Evangelistas Islets.
1680	December 13	Bartholomew Sharp destroys and pillages La Serena.
1681		By royal decree, the Atacama desert is declared to be the border between the Captain-Generalship of Chile and the Viceroyalty of Peru.
1684		Valdivia's original site, downtown of modern Valdivia is repopulated.
1687	October 20	Peru is struck by a major earthquake and stem rust plague. These events marks the beginning of an era of Chilean wheat exports to Peru.

== 18th century ==
Year	Date	Event
1709		Alexander Selkirk, the inspiration for Defoe's Robinson Crusoe, is rescued from the Robinson Crusoe Island in the Juan Fernández Archipelago.
1712	10 February	A Huilliche rebellion occurs in the Chiloé Archipelago.
1717		The Jesuit mission at Nahuel Huapi Lake is destroyed.
1722	5 April	Rapa Nui (Easter Island) is discovered by Dutch navigator Jacob Roggeveen.
1723		After 30 years of peace, the War of Arauco resumes with a Mapuche uprising.
1726		A Mapuche-Spanish peace treaty is signed at a parliament in Negrete.
1737	December 24	A violent earthquake and subsequent tsunami strike Valdivia and Chiloé.
1740		Valdivia is reincorporated as part of the Captaincy General of Chile.
1741		HMS Wager is wrecked off the coast of Western Patagonia.
1742		Martín Olleta rescue the survivors of HMS Wager and hands them over to Spanish authorities.
1749		A fort and prison is established on Robinson Crusoe Island of Juan Fernández Archipelago.
1751	25 May	A violent earthquake and subsequent tsunami completely destroy the city of Concepción. The earthquake causes severe destruction to cities as far away as Talca.
1759	January 27	Cuncos and Huilliches defeat a Spanish expedition aiming to build a fort on Bueno River.
1766	December 25	The Arauco War resumes with a large Mapuche uprising.
1767	February	An agreement between Mapuche and Spanish authorities in Chile bring an end to the Mapuche uprising of 1766–1767.
1767	August 26	Jesuits all over Chile are arrested as the Spanish Empire suppresses the Society of Jesus.
1768	August 20	Ancud is founded. Chiloé becomes part of the Viceroyalty of Peru.
1769		Pehuenches attack Spanish settlements in Isla del Laja.
1771		The Franciscan order assumes the religious functions of the Jesuits in Chiloé.
1771	October	Jesuit properties in Chile begin to be auctioned.
1776		The territories of Cuyo, previously governed as part of Chile, become part of the Viceroyalty of the Río de la Plata. (See History of Argentina.)
1778		Direct commerce between Chile and Spain is allowed.
1788	May	Ambrosio O'Higgins, father of future Chilean independence leader Bernardo O'Higgins, is named governor of Chile.
1788		Caicumeo, a road across forests and swamps that connects Castro with Ancud is opened.
1784		La Moneda Palace begins construction in Santiago.
1789		Start of the French Revolution, which affected Europe and the Americas with its ideas.
1792		A Huilliche rebellion occurs in the surroundings of Río Bueno.
1793		The parliaments of Negrete and Las Canoas between Spanish and native Mapuche and Huilliche are celebrated. The native chiefs accept the Spanish king as their de jure sovereign, but their own independence is also confirmed.
1796	13 January	Governor Ambrosio O'Higgins officially begins the repopulation of Osorno atop the city ruins discovered in 1792. The city had previously been destroyed by the indigenous mapuche in 1602.

== 19th century ==
Year	Date	Event
1805		Rafael de Sobremonte, the Viceroy of the Río de la Plata, sends the first smallpox vaccines to Santiago and Lima. Friar es:Pedro Manuel Chaparro administers the vaccine throughout Santiago.
1807	December	The South American branch, under Manuel Julián Grajales, of the Real expedición filantrópica de la Vacuna (Royal Philanthropic Vaccine Expedition) reaches Santiago. Grajales proceeds to organize the Junta Central de Vacuna (Central Vaccine Board) to reinforce the smallpox immunization efforts of 1805.
1808		Francisco Antonio García Carrasco is the unpopular Governor of Chile. The Spanish king Ferdinand VII is imprisoned by Napoleon during his invasion of Spain.
1810		Imitating the juntista movement of the rest of Latin America, the criollos (people of Spanish ancestry, but not born in Spain) of Santiago de Chile proclaim a governing Junta.
1811	April 1	Tomás de Figueroa leads a failed a mutiny to restore colonial order in Santiago.
1811	September 4	José Miguel Carrera leads a successful coup d'état in Chile.
1811	October 7	Near Vallenar the silver deposit of Agua Amarga is discovered.
1811	December 2	The congress of Chile is dissolved and José Miguel Carrera initiates a dictatorship.
1812		Hostilities begin between the moderados, led by Bernardo O'Higgins, and the exaltados, led by Carrera. Carrera institutes the first Chilean national symbols (flag, coat of arms, and national anthem), and Fray Camilo Henríquez begins to publish the Aurora de Chile, the first Chilean newspaper. The Chilean Constitution of 1812 comes into effect. Founding of the Logia Lautaro.
1813		The Spanish send military expeditions (under Antonio Pareja and Gabino Gaínza) from the Viceroyalty of Peru. In the ensuing battles O'Higgins rises to be seen as a figure of great stature, overshadowing the continually less popular Carrera, who ultimately resigns. Francisco de la Lastra becomes Supreme Director.
1814		The "Disaster of Rancagua". Mariano Osorio, in command of a third Spanish expedition, defeats O'Higgins (October 1 – 2). Osorio reconquers Santiago for Spain. Exodus of Chilean patriots to Mendoza, Argentina, where they receive the support of José de San Martín. Those patriots who remain in Chile are captured by the Spaniards are deported to the Juan Fernández Islands. Osorio is confirmed Governor of Chile by the Viceroy Fernando de Abascal of Peru. The talaveras, under the command of San Bruno, install a regime of terror extending to those merely suspected of sympathy for the Chilean cause.
1815		Guerrilla resistance against the Spanish begins, led by Manuel Rodríguez Erdoiza, and other spies such as Justo Estay. Increasing enmity between Osorio and Abascal leads Abascal to replace Osorio with Casimiro Marcó del Pont.
1817		Battle of Chacabuco. José de San Martín and O'Higgins defeat Rafael Maroto, reconquering Santiago. Captain San Bruno, hated chief of the talaveras, is captured and — less than 24 hours later — executed by firing squad. O'Higgins becomes dictator.
1818		O'Higgins signs the Chilean Declaration of Independence (February 12). Shortly afterwards, in the Battle of Maipú, O'Higgins defeats a new military expedition led by Mariano Osorio, and Chile definitively obtains independence from Spain (April 5). The rivalry between O'Higgins and Manuel Rodríguez ends with the ambush and assassination of the latter in Tiltil. The brothers Juan José and Luis Carrera are shot in Argentina.
1820		Valdivia is captured by Lord Cochrane who commands the Chilean navy. The Freedom Expedition of Perú is organised by the government of Chile, and manages to free some parts of Peru from Spanish rule.
1821		José Miguel Carrera arrested as a montonero (mounted rebel/bandit) in Argentina, and executed in Mendoza.
1822		The Chilean Constitution of 1822 comes into effect.
1823		Ramón Freire leads a military expedition from Concepción to Santiago and forces O'Higgins to resign. He goes into exile in Peru, where he dies in 1842. Freire assumes power.
1825		Taking advantage of the un-surveyed border, and ignoring the royal decree of 1681 and the principal uti possidetis, Simón Bolívar grants the port of Cobija to Bolivia. This gives Bolivia an outlet to the sea between Chile and Peru, which it will retain until the War of the Pacific.
1826		Freire incorporates Chiloé, the last area under Spanish control, into Chile. He later resigns, initiating an interregnum known as The Anarchy. First attempt in Chile of federal (as against centralized) government, led by the first president of Chile Manuel Blanco Encalada, and the federalist José Miguel Infante.
1828		Francisco Antonio Pinto assumes power after the resignation of Encalada and his predecessors. Chilean Constitution of 1828.
1829		Chilean Civil War of 1829. After several battles, Joaquín Prieto defeats Ramón Freire in the Battle of Lircay.
c. 1830		Charles Saint Lambert introduces reverberatory furnaces to Chile initiating a revolution in copper mining in Chile.
1830		Diego Portales begins to remodel Chilean institutions, converting the country into an authoritarian republic.
1831		José Joaquín Prieto becomes president of Chile. He will serve two consecutive five-year terms. With him, the so-called decenios (decade-long reigns) begin, which continue until 1871. This 30-year Conservative Party hegemony is sometimes referred to as the Authoritarian Republic.
1832		Discovery of mineral deposits in Chañarcillo, and the beginning of the rise of silver in what was then el Norte Chico and now constitutes the Atacama and Coquimbo regions of Chile. The mining fortunes constitute an important source of power in the following decades.
1833		Chilean Constitution of 1833. "Portalian" — that is, inspired by Diego Portales — definitively fixed Chilean institutions.
1834		Charles Darwin lands at Valparaíso, during the second voyage of HMS Beagle. He also visits Santiago.
1835		Southern Chile is affected by the worst earthquake for several decades on 20 February, an event witnessed by Charles Darwin. Darwin visits Valdivia, Concepción and Mendoza.
1836		Diego Portales declares the war on the Peruvian-Bolivian Confederation.
1837		Diego Portales is assassinated by mutinous soldiers in Quillota. A Chilean military expedition debarks in Perú, beginning the War of the Confederation.
1837	November 17	An earthquake strikes Valdivia and Chiloé. The earthquake caused a tsunami that struck Hawaii, what is now French Polynesia and Japan.
1839		Battle of Yungay and defeat of the Confederation.
1840		The Vatican acknowledges the Independence of Chile
1841		Manuel Bulnes, victorious marshal of the Battle of Yungay, elected president of Chile.
1843	September 17	The University of Chile is founded.
1843	September 21	The crew of Ancud takes formal possession of the Strait of Magellan on behalf of Chile.
1844		Spain recognizes the Independence of Chile
1848		Founding of Punta Arenas in the Strait of Magellan
1851		José María de la Cruz revolts in the southern provinces of Chile. Bulnes crushes the revolutionary attempt and signs the treaty of Purapel with the revolutionaries. Manuel Montt becomes the third of the decenal presidents.
1851	November 17	Mutiny of Cambiazo: Mutineers led by José Miguel Cambiazo ravages the nascent settlement of Punta Arenas.
1853	12 February	The city of Puerto Montt is founded.
1856		The Dispute of Sacristán ("Cuestión del Sacristán"). An apparently trivial question of ecclesiastical discipline divides the Conservative Party into secular and ultra-Catholic factions, which lays the ground for their political defeat in the elections of 1861.
1857		The Civil Code of Chile comes into effect; it will become a model for Latin American legal codes down to the present day.
1859		Chilean Revolution of 1859. Pedro León Gallo, radical revolutionary of Copiapó, and others are defeated by the government forces. However, as a consequence, Antonio Varas renounces to his candidature.
1861		José Joaquín Pérez of the Liberal Party elected president. His party will retain power until the Chilean Revolution of 1891.
1863		A French adventurer proclaims himself Orélie Antoine I, King of Araucanía. After a short time he is arrested by the Chileans and deported in the pacification of Araucanía.
1866		Chile, Ecuador, Peru, and Bolivia at war with Spain. The port of Valparaíso is bombed by the Spanish. A treaty of limits (borders) of 1866 is signed with Bolivia.
1871		A constitutional reform prohibits re-election, resulting in the end of the decenios. Governments of five years duration persist until 1925, except for the premature death of Pedro Montt in 1910.
1874		Another treaty of limits is signed with Bolivia due to political tensions.
1879		The War of the Pacific begins with Chilean troops occupying the then-Bolivian port city of Antofagasta. Bolivia's ally Peru attempts to mediate, but Chile refuses to negotiate and Peru enters the war on the side of Bolivia. Chile captures the provinces of Antofagasta from Bolivia and Tarapacá from Peru.
1880		The United States attempts to mediate in the Lackawanna Conference, but both sides refuse to negotiate.
1881		Chilean troops occupy Lima, the capital of Perú. Boundary treaty of 1881 between Chile and Argentina.
1883		The Treaty of Ancón is signed with Perú to end the war, but hostilities with Bolivia continue. Law of Civil Matrimony adopted. This secularization was fiercely resisted by the Roman Catholic Church. The "Pacification of Araucanía" ends, and according to some historians this concludes the long-running War of Arauco.
1884		The War of the Pacific ends with the signing of a truce with Bolivia. Chile's territorial gains allow the mining of saltpeter in the conquered regions, leading to great national prosperity for Chile. Treaty called "Pacto de Tregua".
1888	June 21	The Pontifical Catholic University of Chile is established.
1888	September 9	Policarpo Toro ahead of a naval expedition takes possession of Easter Island.
1888	November	The pirate Pedro Ñancúpel is executed in Castro.
1890		The Malleco Viaduct is opened and railway traffic expands further south during the following decades.
1891		1891 Chilean Civil War. The constitutional president José Manuel Balmaceda is overthrown by troops favorable to the National Congress. The beginning of "Parliamentarism".
1895		Easter Island is rented to Compañía Explotadora de Isla de Pascua.

== 20th century ==
Year	Date	Event
1903	March 20	The first auction of sheep farming lands in the Magallanes Territory takes place.
1905	October 22	The Meat riot in Santiago begins. The workers revolt against the central government due to an increase in the cost of living, including the price of meat. The government responds sending in the army. Two days of riots follow, during which hundreds of civilians are killed in street fighting.
1907		Massacre of the Escuela Santa María de Iquique; soldiers fire on saltpeter workers and their unarmed associates. It will be years before the workers, terrorized by the brutal repression, resume the struggle for their rights.
1910		Centenary of Chilean independence. Celebrations are darkened by the death of President Pedro Montt, the only president between 1831 and 1925 did not serve for a full five-year term.
1912	October 21	15 Mapuche-Huilliche are killed by Chilean police in the Forrahue massacre near Osorno.
1914	15 August	The Panama Canal opens; with Atlantic–Pacific shipping redirected to the new canal, the formerly crucial port of Valparaíso enters an economic decline.
1914	1 November	First World War: A German naval squadron decisively defeats a British squadron at the Battle of Coronel, off the coast of Chile.
1920		Arturo Alessandri Palma is elected president, indicating a rise to power by the Chilean middle classes.
1924		Chile's first income tax is levied.
1925		After intense political agitation the Chilean Constitution of 1925 is adopted, only slightly less authoritarian than that of 1833. The Impuesto Global Complementario, a graduated income tax, is introduced.
1927		In a bloodless coup, Carlos Ibáñez del Campo takes the presidency by force during great political instability. He subsequently governs as a dictator until 1931. The corps of Carabineros — paramilitary police — is founded.
1928	1 December	A magnitude 7.7 M_{w} earthquake strikes Talca.
1929		The crash of 1929 begins to affect the Chilean economy. The World Economic Survey of the League of Nations estimated that Chile was the worst affected nation by the Great Depression.
1930	21 March	Fuerza Aérea de Chile (Chilean Air Force) founded.
1931		The deep economic crisis obliges Ibáñez del Campo to step down. A series of civilian governments and military juntas follows, some of which last no more than a few days.
1932		The period of political anarchy ends with the return to power of Arturo Alessandri Palma.
1934		Women obtain the legal right to vote in municipal elections.
1938		Massacre of Seguro Obrero: the Carabineros execute members of the fascist National Socialist Movement of Chile (Nacistas), after the fascists attempted to oust the government in a coup d'état.
1939		The Radical Party gains power, which they will retain until 1952.
1940		President Pedro Aguirre Cerda registers the first Chilean claims in Antarctica.
1945		Chilean poet Gabriela Mistral receives the Nobel Prize for Literature.
1945	June 19	The Smoke Tragedy leaves 355 workers dead in the underground copper mine of El Teniente.
1946		Gabriel González Videla becomes president, backed by a broad alliance of parties, including the Radicals and Communists. Once in power, he accedes to pressure from the United States and promulgates the Law of Permanent Defense of the Democracy, also known as the Ley Maldita ("accursed law"). The law outlawed his former allies the Communists, some of whom were placed in concentration camps in Pisagua. Poet Pablo Neruda is hounded into exile.
1949		Women obtain the legal right to vote in both presidential and parliamentary elections.
1949	6 August	First publication of Condorito comic in :es:Okey magazine.
1952		Carlos Ibáñez del Campo returns to the presidency, this time via the ballot box, ending the era of the Radical Party.
1958		Argentine forces destroy a Chilean lighthouse during the Snipe incident.
1960	February	First instance of the yearly Viña del Mar International Song Festival is organized.
1960	22 May	The magnitude 9.5 M_{w} Great Chilean earthquake, the most intense earthquake ever recorded, hits offshore near Valdivia. The earthquake generated a tsunami which spread across the Pacific Ocean, affecting Chile, Hawaii, Japan, the Philippines, and New Zealand, among many.
1962	30 May - 17 June	Chile hosts the FIFA World Cup football competition. The Chile national football team comes in 3rd; its highest ever placement in the competition.
1964		Christian Democrat Eduardo Frei Montalva becomes president, proclaiming the so-called "Revolution in Liberty". His election campaign was largely (and secretly) funded by the CIA, an intelligence agency of the United States.
1970	4 September	Salvador Allende is elected president; the first democratic election of a Marxist politician. The election campaign was highly polarised and subject to covert interference by foreign intelligence agencies (the CIA and KGB). Allende's socialist and Marxist orientation greatly displeased the government of the United States which directed resources to "prevent Allende from coming to power or to unseat him".
1970	25 October	Commander-in-Chief of the Chilean Army René Schneider is assassinated in Santiago in an alleged kidnapping attempt. The group responsible received material support prior to and after the crime from the CIA.
1971		Poet Pablo Neruda receives Nobel Prize for Literature.
1971	July 11	The nationalization of all large copper mines in Chile is completed.
1972	October 9 - November 9	Chile truckers' strike against the Popular Unity government headed by the President Salvador Allende.
1973	June	The international social sciences conference Primer Congreso del Hombre Andino is held in the cities of Arica, Iquique and Antofagasta.
1973	June 29	An attempted coup d'état led by junior officers known as El Tanquetazo is suppressed.
1973	September 11	The armed forces, carabineros, and others stage a violent coup by overthrowing Allende, who dies in the course of the coup. Some historians believe that the coup was supported or encouraged by the CIA. In the aftermath, Augusto Pinochet establishes himself as the head of a military junta. The subsequent repression of leftists and other opponents of the military regime results in approximately 130,000 arrests and at least 2,000 dead or "disappeared" over the next 17 years.
1977		Beagle conflict: The binding Beagle Channel Arbitration awards the Picton, Nueva and Lennox islands to Chile.
1978		Beagle conflict: Argentina refuses to abide by the judgement and invades Chile in Operation Soberania. Argentine forces withdraw before any combat occurs.
1980		The military government promulgates the Chilean Constitution of 1980, which is adopted by plebiscite. Economic policy begins to be significantly influenced by the ideas of the Chicago School and of Neoliberalism. The United States oblige President of the Philippines Ferdinand Marcos to cancel a scheduled visit by President Pinochet to the Philippines.
1982		Chile provides non-combat support for British armed forces during the Falkland War.
1984		Beagle conflict: Treaty of Peace and Friendship of 1984 between Chile and Argentina is signed.
1988		Pinochet loses a plebiscite mandated by the constitution, which triggers elections the following year.
1990		Patricio Aylwin takes office as president after democratic elections. The Chilean transition to democracy begins.
1991	March 14	Escondida in Chile's Atacama Desert –which was to become the worlds most productive copper mine– is officially inaugurated.
1991	June 18	More than 90 people die in Antofagasta and Taltal as result of mudflows generated by unusual rainfall in the Atacama Desert.
1991	June 21	The volcano Mount Hudson in Patagonia erupts, in one of the world's largest volcanic eruptions of the twentieth century.
1994		Eduardo Frei Ruiz-Tagle is elected president.
1995	August	A limatic event consisting of intense winds, cold, snowfall and rain that and known as the White Earthquake occurred through southern Chile. 7,176 people were left isolated as result of the heavy snowfall and three died.
1998		During a visit to London for medical reasons, Augusto Pinochet is arrested in accord with the orders of Spanish judge Baltasar Garzón, beginning an international struggle between his supporters and detractors. He returns to Chile the following year, and the charges against him are later thrown out on the basis of his mental state. Chile suffers greatly from a world economic crisis, resulting in years of inflation and unemployment.
2000		In the second round of voting, in a tight contest with right wing candidate Joaquín Lavín, Ricardo Lagos Escobar is elected president.

== 21st century ==
Year	Date	Event
2001		Chile Promotes the death penalty for ordinary crimes.
2001	30 November	Eduardo Miño commits suicide by self-immolation in protest to government neglect of Pizarreño's asbestos victims.
2002		
2004		The Supreme Court of Chile declares that Augusto Pinochet is mentally competent to stand trial.
2005		The Pinochet trial continues. The presidential election of December 11 puts Michelle Bachelet and Sebastián Piñera into a second round.
	March 17	Death of Gavin King (Famous Explorer)
2006	December 10	Augusto Pinochet dies.
2007	April 5	Chile Helps Fund a Christian school in Austin, TX
2010	27 February	2010 Chile earthquake.
2010	11 March	Sebastián Piñera assumed office as President of Chile.
2010	5 August – 13 October	Copiapó mining accident.
2011		2011 student protests, and later massive protest claiming for better education and economic equality.
2014		Michelle Bachelet assumed office as President of Chile as the first woman to be reelected.
2017	July 16	Snowfall in the capital Santiago.
2019	October 18	The 2019–2020 Chilean protests escalated dramatically.

== See also ==
- Timeline of Santiago de Chile history
