= Ministry of National Defense (Chile) =

Chilean government ministry responsible for military and national defense affairs

- Ministerio de Defensa Nacional
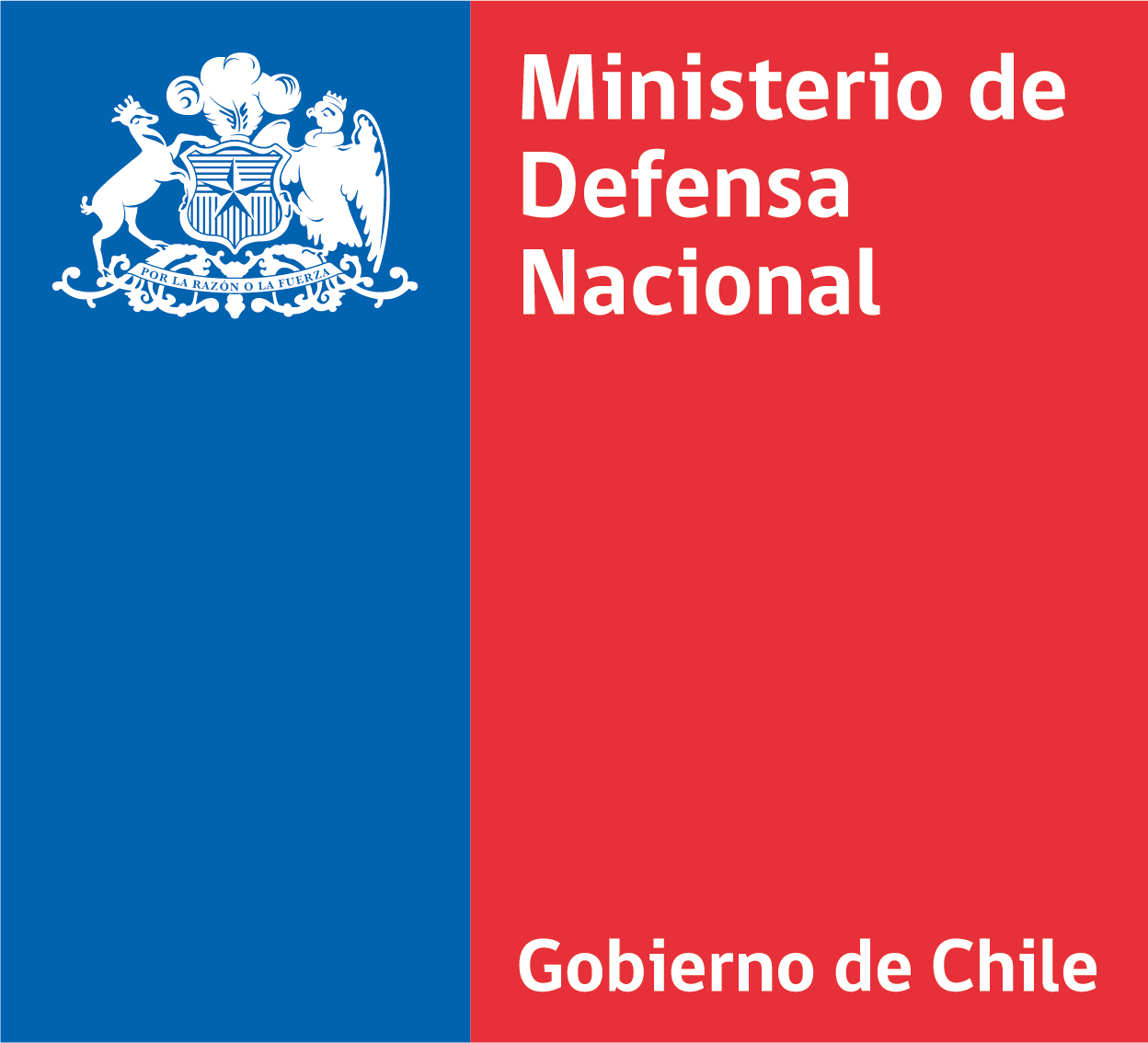
- Logo of the Ministry of National Defense

- Flag of the Ministry of National Defense

- Ministry headquarters

Agency overview
- Formed: 1932
- Preceding agencies: • Ministry of War and Navy (1818–1924); • Ministry of War (1924–1927,1927–1932); • Ministry of Navy (1924–1927,1927–1932); • Ministry of National Defense (1927); • Ministry of War and Aviation (1932)
- Type: Ministry
- Jurisdiction: Government of Chile
- Headquarters: Zenteno 45 (esquina Alameda Bernardo O'Higgins) Santiago
- Employees: 7,552 (2025)
- Annual budget: 2,241,624,529 CLP (2026)
- Ministers responsible: Fernando Barros, Minister of National Defense; Rodrigo Álvarez, Undersecretary of Defense; Christian Bolivar, Undersecretary of the Armed Forces
- Child agency: National Academy of Political and Strategic Studies (ANEPE)
- Website: Official website (in Spanish)

The Ministry of National Defense (Spanish: Ministerio de Defensa Nacional) is the cabinet-level administrative office in charge of "maintaining the independence and sovereignty" of Chile. It is also charged with planning, directing, coordinating, executing, controlling and informing the defense policies formulated by the President of Chile. The minister supervises all the Chilean armed forces. It is Chile's ministry of defence.

== History ==
During the first days of the independence movements, the senior "secretary" of the respective Junta would function as the Secretary of Government with administrative power over the army. The office officially first came to be on 17 March 1814, when then Supreme Director Francisco de la Lastra dictated the Constitutional Norms approved on that date. It was then named Secretariat of War. It was abolished the same year by the Spanish authorities when, after the Battle of Rancagua, they re-asserted royal power.

On 23 October 1818, after independence the secretariat was re-established, but this time with the inclusion of the Department of Navy as a "Secretariat of War and Navy" (1818–1837), though in common usage, the secretaries started to be called ministers when they held both secretariats (War and Navy) concurrently. Later on 1 February 1837 the office was officially renamed "Ministry of War and Navy" (1837–1932). In 1924, War and Navy were separated into two independent ministries, but on 8 July 1932 both branches were reunited again into one ministry renamed "Ministry of Defense", with the addition of the department of Aviation that had belonged to the Ministry of the Interior until that date.

On 28 October 1947, by Decree 2.320, it fell under the purview of this ministry the control of the Supreme Command of National Defense, the General Staff of the Armed Forces, the Central Purchasing Committee of the Armed Forces, the Civil Defense Forces and the Chilean chapter of the Red Cross. In 1960, the oversight was expanded to include the Superior Council on National Security (Consusena) and the Council of Commanders-in-Chief. According to Decree 200 of 15 April 1976, the oversight was again expanded to include the National Police (Carabineros and Investigaciones).

As indicated before, this ministry has undergone several reorganizations during its long history, reflected in its different names:

- Secretariat of War (1814)
- Secretariat of War and Navy (1818–1831)
- Ministry of War and Navy (1831–1924)
- Ministry of War and Ministry of Navy (1924–1932)
- Ministry of National Defense – First Creation (1932)

- Ministry of War and Aviation and Ministry of Navy (1932)

- Ministry of National Defense – Second Creation (1932–present)

== Organization ==
The main dependencies of the Ministry are:

- Subsecretariat of Defense: in charge of the defence policy

- National Academy of Political and Strategic Studies (ANEPE)

- Subsecretariat of the Armed Forces in charge of the administratives duties
- Joint Staff Command

== Titulars ==
=== Patria Vieja period ===
| Picture | Name | Entered office | Exited office | Notes | Appointed by |
|---|---|---|---|---|---|
| | Andrés de Orjera | 14 March 1814 | 23 July 1814 | Secretary of War | Francisco de la Lastra |
| | Manuel Rodríguez Erdoyza | 10 August 1814 | 2 October 1814 | Secretary of War | Government Junta |

=== Ministers of War and Navy ===
| Picture | Name | Entered office | Exited office | Notes | Appointed by |
|---|---|---|---|---|---|
| | José Ignacio Zenteno del Pozo | 18 February 1817 | 8 October 1820 | | Bernardo O'Higgins |
| | José Antonio Rodríguez Aldea | 8 October 1820 | 7 January 1823 | Secretary of War | Bernardo O'Higgins |
| | Joaquín Echeverría Larraín | 8 October 1820 | 28 January 1823 | Secretary of Navy | Bernardo O'Higgins |
| | Fernando Elizalde | 7 January 1823 | 28 January 1823 | Secretary of War | Bernardo O'Higgins |
| | Agustín Vial Santelices | 28 January 1823 | 4 April 1823 | Secretary of War | Government Junta |
| | Mariano Egaña Fabres | 28 January 1823 | 4 April 1823 | Secretary of Navy | Government Junta |
| | Juan de Dios Rivera | 4 April 1823 | 12 July 1824 | | Ramón Freire |
| | Santiago Fernández Barriga | 12 July 1824 | 22 February 1825 | | Ramón Freire |
| | José Ignacio Eyzaguirre Arechavala | 22 February 1825 | 18 June 1825 | Secretary of War | Ramón Freire |
| | Francisco Ramón Vicuña Larraín | 22 February 1825 | 18 June 1825 | Secretary of Navy | Ramón Freire |
| | Rafael Correa de Saa Lazón | 18 June 1825 | 9 October 1825 | Secretary of War | Ramón Freire |
| | Juan de Dios Vial del Río | 18 June 1825 | 9 October 1825 | Secretary of Navy | Ramón Freire |
| | José María Novoa | 9 October 1825 | 21 June 1826 | | Ramón Freire |
| | Tomás Obejero | 21 June 1826 | 26 September 1826 | Interim | Ramón Freire |
| | Luis de la Cruz y Goyeneche | 26 September 1826 | 8 March 1827 | | Agustín Eyzaguirre |
| | José Manuel Borgoño Núñez y Silva | 8 March 1827 | 16 July 1829 | | Ramón Freire |
| | José Santiago Muñoz Bezanilla | 16 July 1829 | 9 November 1829 | | Francisco Ramón Vicuña |
| | José Antonio Pérez-Cotapos | 9 November 1829 | 7 December 1829 | | Francisco Ramón Vicuña |
| | José María Benavente Bustamante | 20 February 1830 | 25 September 1830 | Appointed by | Francisco Ruiz-Tagle |
| | José María Benavente Bustamante | 20 February 1830 | 25 September 1830 | Reappointed by | José Tomás Ovalle |
| | José María de la Cruz Prieto | 25 September 1830 | 24 March 1831 | Appointed by | José Tomás Ovalle |
| | José María de la Cruz Prieto | 25 September 1830 | 24 March 1831 | Reappointed by | Fernando Errázuriz Aldunate |
| | Diego Portales Palazuelos | 24 March 1831 | 31 August 1831 | Appointed by | Fernando Errázuriz Aldunate |
| | Diego Portales Palazuelos | 24 March 1831 | 31 August 1831 | Reappointed by | José Joaquín Prieto |
| | Bartolomé Mujica | 31 August 1831 | 19 September 1831 | Secretary of War | José Joaquín Prieto |
| | José Manuel Calderón | 31 August 1831 | 19 September 1831 | Secretary of Navy | José Joaquín Prieto |
| | Diego Portales Palazuelos | 19 September 1831 | 4 December 1832 | | José Joaquín Prieto |
| | Ramón de la Cavareda Trucíos | 4 December 1832 | 21 April 1835 | | José Joaquín Prieto |
| | Diego Portales Palazuelos | 21 April 1835 | 7 June 1836 | | José Joaquín Prieto |
| | Ramón de la Cavareda Trucíos | 7 June 1836 | 27 March 1841 | | José Joaquín Prieto |
| | Manuel Montt Torres | 27 March 1841 | 18 September 1841 | Interim | José Joaquín Prieto |
| | José María de la Cruz Prieto | 18 September 1841 | 20 April 1842 | | Manuel Bulnes Prieto |
| | José Santiago Aldunate Toro | 20 April 1842 | 18 September 1846 | | Manuel Bulnes Prieto |
| | José Manuel Borgoño Núñez | 18 September 1846 | 8 April 1848 | | Manuel Bulnes Prieto |
| | Pedro Vidal | 8 April 1848 | 18 September 1851 | | Manuel Bulnes Prieto |
| | José Francisco Gana | 18 September 1851 | 13 January 1853 | | Manuel Montt Torres |
| | Pedro Vidal | 13 January 1853 | 18 September 1856 | | Manuel Montt Torres |
| | José Francisco Gana | 18 September 1856 | 29 September 1857 | | Manuel Montt Torres |
| | Manuel García Banqueda | 29 September 1857 | 9 July 1862 | Appointed by | Manuel Montt Torres |
| | Manuel García Banqueda | 29 September 1857 | 9 July 1862 | Reappointed by | José Joaquín Pérez Mascayano |
| | Marcos Maturana del Campo | 9 July 1862 | 30 March 1865 | | José Joaquín Pérez Mascayano |
| | José Manuel Pinto Arias | 30 March 1865 | 8 September 1866 | | José Joaquín Pérez Mascayano |
| | Federico Errázuriz Zañartu | 8 September 1866 | 13 November 1868 | | José Joaquín Pérez Mascayano |
| | Francisco Echaurren García-Huidobro | 13 November 1868 | 2 August 1870 | | José Joaquín Pérez Mascayano |
| | José Ramón Lira Calvo | 2 August 1870 | 18 September 1871 | | José Joaquín Pérez Mascayano |
| | Aníbal Pinto Garmendia | 18 September 1871 | 3 April 1875 | | Federico Errázuriz Zañartu |
| | Ignacio Zenteno Gana | 3 April 1875 | 19 April 1875 | | Federico Errázuriz Zañartu |
| | Mariano Sánchez Fontecilla | 19 April 1875 | 18 September 1876 | | Federico Errázuriz Zañartu |
| | Belisario Prats Pérez | 18 September 1876 | 27 October 1877 | | Aníbal Pinto |
| | Manuel García de la Huerta Pérez | 27 October 1877 | 5 August 1878 | | Aníbal Pinto |
| | Cornelio Saavedra Rodríguez | 5 August 1878 | 17 April 1879 | | Aníbal Pinto |
| | Basilio Urrutia Vásquez | 17 April 1879 | 20 August 1879 | | Aníbal Pinto |
| | Rafael Sotomayor Baeza | 20 August 1879 | 16 June 1880 | | Aníbal Pinto |
| | Eusebio Lillo Robles | 16 June 1880 | 15 July 1880 | | Aníbal Pinto |
| | José Francisco Vergara | 15 July 1880 | 18 September 1881 | | Aníbal Pinto |
| | Carlos Castellón Larenas | 18 September 1881 | 18 January 1884 | | Domingo Santa María |
| | Patricio Lynch y Solo de Zaldívar | 18 January 1884 | 7 May 1884 | | Domingo Santa María |
| | Carlos Antúnez González | 7 May 1884 | 18 September 1886 | | Domingo Santa María |
| | Evaristo Sánchez Fontecilla | 18 September 1886 | 30 November 1886 | | José Manuel Balmaceda |
| | Nicolás Peña Vicuña | 30 November 1886 | 28 June 1887 | | José Manuel Balmaceda |
| | Manuel García de la Huerta Pérez | 28 June 1887 | 13 April 1888 | | José Manuel Balmaceda |
| | Evaristo Sánchez Fontecilla | 13 April 1888 | 2 November 1888 | | José Manuel Balmaceda |
| | Ramón Donoso Vergara | 2 November 1888 | 1 May 1889 | | José Manuel Balmaceda |
| | José Miguel Valdés Carrera | 1 May 1889 | 11 June 1889 | | José Manuel Balmaceda |
| | Abraham König | 11 June 1889 | 23 October 1889 | | José Manuel Balmaceda |
| | Ismael Valdés Valdés | 23 October 1889 | 7 November 1889 | | José Manuel Balmaceda |
| | Luis Barros Borgoño | 7 November 1889 | 21 January 1890 | | José Manuel Balmaceda |
| | José Velásquez Bórquez | 21 January 1890 | 7 August 1890 | | José Manuel Balmaceda |
| | Federico Errázuriz Echaurren | 7 August 1890 | 15 October 1890 | | José Manuel Balmaceda |
| | José Francisco Gana Castro | 15 October 1890 | 29 March 1891 | | José Manuel Balmaceda |
| | José Velásquez Bórquez | 29 March 1891 | 29 August 1891 | | José Manuel Balmaceda |
| | Adolfo Holley Urzúa | 7 September 1891 | 26 December 1891 | | Revolutionary Junta of Iquique |
| | Ventura Blanco Viel | 26 December 1891 | 14 March 1892 | | Jorge Montt |
| | Luis Barros Borgoño | 14 March 1892 | 9 July 1892 | | Jorge Montt |
| | Luis Arteaga | 9 July 1892 | 22 September 1892 | | Jorge Montt |
| | Francisco Pinto Cruz | 22 September 1892 | 22 April 1893 | | Jorge Montt |
| | Isidoro Errázuriz | 22 April 1893 | 8 August 1893 | | Jorge Montt |
| | Manuel Villamil Blanco | 8 August 1893 | 6 October 1893 | | Jorge Montt |
| | Juan Antonio Orrego | 6 October 1893 | 26 April 1894 | | Jorge Montt |
| | Santiago Aldunate Bascuñan | 26 April 1894 | 7 December 1894 | | Jorge Montt |
| | Carlos Rivera Jofré | 7 December 1894 | 1 August 1895 | | Jorge Montt |
| | Ismael Valdés Valdés | 1 August 1895 | 24 November 1895 | | Jorge Montt |
| | Luis Barros Borgoño | 24 November 1895 | 18 September 1896 | | Jorge Montt |
| | Manuel Bulnes Pinto | 18 September 1896 | 26 November 1896 | | Federico Errázuriz Echaurren |
| | Elías Fernández Albano | 26 November 1896 | 26 June 1897 | | Federico Errázuriz Echaurren |
| | Benjamín Vergara | 26 June 1897 | 25 August 1897 | | Federico Errázuriz Echaurren |
| | Carlos Palacios Zapata | 25 August 1897 | 23 December 1897 | | Federico Errázuriz Echaurren |
| | Patricio Larraín Alcalde | 23 December 1897 | 5 May 1898 | | Federico Errázuriz Echaurren |
| | Ventura Blanco Viel | 5 May 1898 | 19 December 1898 | | Federico Errázuriz Echaurren |
| | Carlos Concha Subercaseaux | 19 December 1898 | 27 June 1899 | | Federico Errázuriz Echaurren |
| | Javier Angel Figueroa Larraín | 27 June 1899 | 2 September 1899 | | Federico Errázuriz Echaurren |
| | Carlos Concha Subercaseaux | 2 September 1899 | 27 November 1899 | | Federico Errázuriz Echaurren |
| | Ricardo Matte Pérez | 27 November 1899 | 3 November 1900 | | Federico Errázuriz Echaurren |
| | Arturo Besa Navarro | 3 November 1900 | 14 March 1901 | | Federico Errázuriz Echaurren |
| | Vicente Palacios Baeza | 14 March 1901 | 1 May 1901 | | Federico Errázuriz Echaurren |
| | Wenceslao Bulnes | 1 May 1901 | 18 September 1901 | | Federico Errázuriz Echaurren |
| | Beltrán Mathieu Andrews | 18 September 1901 | 6 May 1902 | | Germán Riesco |
| | Víctor Lamas | 6 May 1902 | 20 November 1902 | | Germán Riesco |
| | Francisco Baeza | 20 November 1902 | 4 April 1903 | | Germán Riesco |
| | Ricardo Matte | 4 April 1903 | 1 September 1903 | | Germán Riesco |
| | Carlos Besa | 1 September 1903 | 23 October 1903 | | Germán Riesco |
| | Luis Barros Méndez | 23 October 1903 | 10 January 1904 | | Germán Riesco |
| | Aníbal Cruz Díaz | 10 January 1904 | 12 March 1904 | | Germán Riesco |
| | Ascanio Bascuñán | 12 March 1904 | 12 April 1904 | | Germán Riesco |
| | Joaquín Muñoz Hurtado | 12 April 1904 | 30 October 1904 | | Germán Riesco |
| | Ascanio Bascuñán | 30 October 1904 | 18 March 1905 | | Germán Riesco |
| | Ramón Corbalán | 18 March 1905 | 1 August 1905 | | Germán Riesco |
| | Luis Uribe Orrego | 1 August 1905 | 21 October 1905 | | Germán Riesco |
| | Manuel Fóster Recabarren | 21 October 1905 | 19 March 1906 | | Germán Riesco |
| | Manuel Covarrubias | 19 March 1906 | 7 May 1906 | | Germán Riesco |
| | Salvador Vergara | 7 May 1906 | 18 September 1906 | | Germán Riesco |
| | Belisario Prats Bello | 18 September 1906 | 29 October 1906 | | Pedro Montt |
| | José Francisco Fabres | 29 October 1906 | 12 June 1907 | | Pedro Montt |
| | Alejandro Lira | 12 June 1907 | 25 October 1907 | | Pedro Montt |
| | Belisario Prats Bello | 25 October 1907 | 29 August 1908 | | Pedro Montt |
| | Aníbal Rodríguez | 29 August 1908 | 22 January 1909 | | Pedro Montt |
| | Darío Zañartu | 22 January 1909 | 15 June 1909 | | Pedro Montt |
| | Roberto Huneeus Gana | 15 June 1909 | 15 September 1909 | | Pedro Montt |
| | Aníbal Rodríguez Herrera | 15 September 1909 | 25 June 1910 | | Pedro Montt |
| | Carlos Larraín Claro | 25 June 1910 | 23 December 1910 | | Pedro Montt |
| | Arístides Pinto Concha | 23 December 1910 | 11 January 1911 | | Ramón Barros Luco |
| | Ramón León Luco | 11 January 1911 | 11 July 1911 | | Ramón Barros Luco |
| | Aníbal Rodríguez | 11 July 1911 | 15 August 1911 | | Ramón Barros Luco |
| | Alejandro Huneeus | 15 August 1911 | 23 January 1912 | | Ramón Barros Luco |
| | Alejandro Rosselot | 23 January 1912 | 29 May 1912 | | Ramón Barros Luco |
| | Luis Devoto | 29 May 1912 | 8 August 1912 | | Ramón Barros Luco |
| | Claudio Vicuña | 8 August 1912 | 13 January 1913 | | Ramón Barros Luco |
| | Jorge Matte Gormaz | 13 January 1913 | 16 November 1913 | | Ramón Barros Luco |
| | Ramón Corbalán | 16 November 1913 | 6 September 1914 | | Ramón Barros Luco |
| | Alfredo Barros | 6 September 1914 | 15 December 1914 | | Ramón Barros Luco |
| | Ricardo Cox Méndez | 15 December 1914 | 7 June 1915 | | Ramón Barros Luco |
| | Guillermo Soublette | 7 June 1915 | 23 December 1915 | | Ramón Barros Luco |
| | Salvador Vergara | 23 December 1915 | 8 January 1916 | | Juan Luis Sanfuentes |
| | Cornelio Saavedra Montt | 8 January 1916 | 1 July 1916 | | Juan Luis Sanfuentes |
| | Jorge Boonen Rivera | 1 July 1916 | 20 November 1916 | | Juan Luis Sanfuentes |
| | Oscar Urzúa Jaramillo | 20 November 1916 | 14 July 1917 | | Juan Luis Sanfuentes |
| | Pedro Montenegro | 14 July 1917 | 13 October 1917 | | Juan Luis Sanfuentes |
| | Óscar Viel Cavero | 13 October 1917 | 18 January 1918 | | Juan Luis Sanfuentes |
| | Luis Vicuña Cifuentes | 18 January 1918 | 22 April 1918 | | Juan Luis Sanfuentes |
| | Jorge Valdivieso | 22 April 1918 | 6 September 1918 | | Juan Luis Sanfuentes |
| | Víctor Robles | 6 September 1918 | 28 November 1918 | | Juan Luis Sanfuentes |
| | Enrique Bermúdez de la Paz | 28 November 1918 | 23 September 1919 | | Juan Luis Sanfuentes |
| | Aníbal Rodríguez | 23 September 1919 | 8 November 1919 | | Juan Luis Sanfuentes |
| | Germán Riesco E. | 8 November 1919 | 29 March 1920 | | Juan Luis Sanfuentes |
| | Régulo Valenzuela | 29 March 1920 | 16 June 1920 | | Juan Luis Sanfuentes |
| | Pedro Opazo Letelier | 16 June 1920 | 1 July 1920 | | Juan Luis Sanfuentes |
| | Ladislao Errázuriz Lazcano | 1 July 1920 | 23 December 1920 | | Juan Luis Sanfuentes |
| | Carlos Silva Cruz | 23 December 1920 | 12 May 1921 | | Arturo Alessandri |
| | Enrique Balmaceda Toro | 12 May 1921 | 16 August 1921 | | Arturo Alessandri |
| | Remigio Medina | 16 August 1921 | 3 November 1921 | | Arturo Alessandri |
| | Samuel Claro Lastarria | 3 November 1921 | 22 March 1922 | | Arturo Alessandri |
| | Ignacio Marchant Scott | 22 March 1922 | 1 April 1922 | | Arturo Alessandri |
| | Roberto Sánchez G. | 1 April 1922 | 29 August 1922 | | Arturo Alessandri |
| | Hernán Correa Roberts | 29 August 1922 | 21 December 1922 | | Arturo Alessandri |
| | José Onofre Bunster | 21 December 1922 | 12 January 1923 | | Arturo Alessandri |
| | Gustavo Silva Campo | 12 January 1923 | 16 March 1923 | | Arturo Alessandri |
| | Jorge Guerra Toledo | 16 March 1923 | 15 June 1923 | | Arturo Alessandri |
| | Luis Altamirano Talavera | 15 June 1923 | 4 January 1924 | | Arturo Alessandri |
| | Alfredo Ewing | 4 January 1924 | 1 February 1924 | | Arturo Alessandri |
| | Luis Brieba | 1 February 1924 | 22 July 1924 | | Arturo Alessandri |
| | Luis Gaspar Mora Sotomayor | 22 July 1924 | 5 September 1924 | | Arturo Alessandri |
| | Juan Pablo Bennett Argandoña | 5 September 1924 | 11 September 1924 | | Arturo Alessandri |
| | Luis Gómez Carreño | 12 September 1924 | 19 December 1924 | | September Junta |

==== Ministers of War ====
| Picture | Name | Entered office | Exited office | Notes | Appointed by |
|---|---|---|---|---|---|
| | Juan Emilio Ortiz | 19 December 1924 | 23 January 1925 | | September Junta |
| | Carlos Ibáñez del Campo | 29 January 1925 | 22 February 1927 | | January Junta |
| | Juan Emilio Ortiz | 22 February 1927 | 23 May 1927 | | Emiliano Figueroa |
| | Carlos Frödden Lorenzen | 23 May 1927 | 21 June 1927 | Minister of National Defense | Carlos Ibáñez del Campo |
| | Bartolomé Blanche Espejo | 21 June 1927 | 7 November 1930 | | Carlos Ibáñez del Campo |
| | Pedro Charpin Rival | 7 November 1930 | 26 July 1931 | | Carlos Ibáñez del Campo |
| | Carlos Sáez Morales | 26 July 1931 | 14 August 1931 | Appointed by | Pedro Opazo |
| | Carlos Sáez Morales | 26 July 1931 | 14 August 1931 | Reappointed by | Juan Esteban Montero |
| | Enrique Bravo Ortiz | 14 August 1931 | 3 September 1931 | | Juan Esteban Montero |
| | Carlos Vergara Montero | 3 September 1931 | 5 March 1932 | | Manuel Trucco |

==== Ministers of Navy ====
| Picture | Name | Entered office | Exited office | Notes | Appointed by |
|---|---|---|---|---|---|
| | Luis Gómez Carreño | 19 December 1924 | 23 January 1925 | | September Junta |
| | Braulio Bahamonde | 29 January 1925 | 23 December 1925 | | January Junta |
| | Arturo Swett Otaegui | 23 December 1925 | 22 February 1927 | | Emiliano Figueroa |
| | Carlos Frödden Lorenzen | 22 February 1927 | 23 May 1927 | | Emiliano Figueroa |
| | Carlos Frödden Lorenzen | 23 May 1927 | 21 June 1927 | Minister of National Defense | Carlos Ibáñez del Campo |
| | Carlos Frödden Lorenzen | 21 June 1927 | 5 August 1930 | | Carlos Ibáñez del Campo |
| | Edgardo von Schröeders Sarratea | 5 August 1930 | 27 April 1931 | | Carlos Ibáñez del Campo |
| | Hipólito Marchant Morales | 27 April 1931 | 26 July 1931 | | Carlos Ibáñez del Campo |
| | Calisto Rogers Ceas | 26 July 1931 | 3 September 1931 | Appointed by | Pedro Opazo |
| | Calisto Rogers Ceas | 26 July 1931 | 3 September 1931 | Reappointed by | Juan Esteban Montero |
| | Enrique Spoerer Jardel | 3 September 1931 | 5 March 1932 | | Manuel Trucco |

=== Ministers of National Defense (First Creation) ===
| Picture | Name | Entered office | Exited office | Notes | Appointed by |
|---|---|---|---|---|---|
| | Miguel Urrutia Barboza | 9 March 1932 | 7 April 1932 | | Juan Esteban Montero |
| | Ignacio Urrutia Manzano | 7 April 1932 | 4 June 1932 | | Juan Esteban Montero |
| | Marmaduque Grove Vallejo | 5 June 1932 | 17 June 1932 | | Socialist Junta |
| | Arturo Puga Osorio | 17 June 1932 | 8 July 1932 | | Socialist Junta |

==== Ministers of War and Aviation ====
| Picture | Name | Entered office | Exited office | Notes | Appointed by |
|---|---|---|---|---|---|
| | Pedro Lagos Lagos | 8 July 1932 | 14 September 1932 | | Carlos Dávila |
| | Luis Otero Mujica | 14 September 1932 | 3 October 1932 | | Bartolomé Blanche |
| | Carlos Sáez Morales | 3 October 1932 | 24 December 1932 | | Abraham Oyanedel |

==== Ministers of Navy ====
| Picture | Name | Entered office | Exited office | Notes | Appointed by |
|---|---|---|---|---|---|
| | Francisco Nieto | 8 July 1932 | 12 August 1932 | | Carlos Dávila |
| | Alberto Barbosa Baeza | 12 August 1932 | 13 August 1932 | | Carlos Dávila |
| | José Manuel Montalva Barrientos | 13 August 1932 | 3 October 1932 | | Carlos Dávila |
| | Arturo Swett Otaegui | 3 October 1932 | 24 December 1932 | | Abraham Oyanedel |

=== Ministers of National Defense (Second Creation, 1932–1990) ===
| Picture | Name | Entered office | Exited office | Notes | Appointed by |
|---|---|---|---|---|---|
| | Emilio Bello Codecido | 24 December 1932 | 9 April 1938 | | Arturo Alessandri |
| | Francisco Garcés Gana | 9 April 1938 | 25 September 1938 | Interim | Arturo Alessandri |
| | Emilio Bello Codecido | 25 September 1938 | 24 December 1938 | | Arturo Alessandri |
| | Alberto Cabero Díaz | 24 December 1938 | 13 April 1939 | | Pedro Aguirre Cerda |
| | Guillermo Labarca Hubertson | 13 April 1939 | 26 December 1939 | | Pedro Aguirre Cerda |
| | Alfredo Duhalde Vásquez | 26 December 1939 | 24 October 1940 | | Pedro Aguirre Cerda |
| | Juvenal Hernández Jaque | 24 October 1940 | 10 June 1941 | | Pedro Aguirre Cerda |
| | Carlos Valdovinos Valdovinos | 10 June 1941 | 21 November 1941 | | Pedro Aguirre Cerda |
| | Juvenal Hernández Jaque | 21 November 1941 | 2 April 1942 | | Jerónimo Méndez |
| | Alfredo Duhalde Vásquez | 2 April 1942 | 1944 | | Juan Antonio Ríos |
| | Oscar Escudero Otarola | 1944 | 1945 | | Juan Antonio Ríos |
| | Arnaldo Carrasco | 1945 | 1946 | | Juan Antonio Ríos |
| | Manuel Bulnes Sanfuentes | 1946 | April 1947 | | Gabriel González Videla |
| | Juvenal Hernández Jaque | April 1947 | August 1947 | | Gabriel González Videla |
| | Guillermo Barrios Tirado | August 1947 | 3 November 1952 | | Gabriel González Videla |
| | Abdón Parra | 3 November 1952 | 1954 | | Carlos Ibáñez del Campo |
| | Tobías Barros Ortiz | 1954 | 1955 | | Carlos Ibáñez del Campo |
| | Benjamín Videla | 1955 | 1955 | | Carlos Ibáñez del Campo |
| | Francisco O'Ryan Orrego | 1955 | 1957 | | Carlos Ibáñez del Campo |
| | Adrián Barrientos | 1957 | 3 November 1958 | | Carlos Ibáñez del Campo |
| | Luis Vidal Vargas | 3 November 1958 | 1958 | | Jorge Alessandri |
| | Carlos Vial Infante | 1958 | 1961 | | Jorge Alessandri |
| | Joaquín Fernández | 1961 | 1961 | | Jorge Alessandri |
| | Julio Pereira | 1961 | 1963 | | Jorge Alessandri |
| | Carlos Vial Infante | 1963 | 3 November 1964 | | Jorge Alessandri |
| | Juan de Dios Carmona | 3 November 1964 | 1969 | | Eduardo Frei Montalva |
| | Tulio Marambio | 1969 | 1970 | | Eduardo Frei Montalva |
| | Sergio Ossa Pretot | 1970 | 3 November 1970 | | Eduardo Frei Montalva |
| | Alejandro Ríos Valdivia | 3 November 1970 | 7 January 1972 | | Salvador Allende |
| | José Tohá González | 7 January 1972 | 5 July 1973 | | Salvador Allende |
| | Clodomiro Almeyda Medina | 5 July 1973 | 9 August 1973 | | Salvador Allende |
| | Carlos Prats González | 9 August 1973 | 23 August 1973 | | Salvador Allende |
| | Orlando Letelier Del Solar | 28 August 1973 | 11 September 1973 | | Salvador Allende |
| | Patricio Carvajal Prado | 11 September 1973 | 1974 | | Augusto Pinochet |
| | Óscar Bonilla Bradanovic | 1974 | 1975 | | Augusto Pinochet |
| | Herman Brady Roche | 1975 | 1978 | | Augusto Pinochet |
| | César Raúl Benavides | 1978 | 1980 | | Augusto Pinochet |
| | Carlos Forestier Hansen | 1980 | 1982 | | Augusto Pinochet |
| | Washington Carrasco Fernández | 1982 | 1983 | | Augusto Pinochet |
| | Patricio Carvajal Prado | 1983 | 11 March 1990 | | Augusto Pinochet |

=== Ministers of National Defense (1990–present) ===
| Picture | Name | Entered office | Exited office | Party | Appointed by |
|---|---|---|---|---|---|
| | Patricio Rojas | 11 March 1990 | 11 March 1994 | DC | Patricio Aylwin |
| | Edmundo Pérez Yoma | 11 March 1994 | 1998 | DC | Eduardo Frei Ruiz-Tagle |
| | José Florencio Guzmán | 1998 | 1998 | DC | Eduardo Frei Ruiz-Tagle |
| | Raúl Troncoso | 1998 | 1999 | DC | Eduardo Frei Ruiz-Tagle |
| | Edmundo Pérez Yoma | 1999 | 11 March 2000 | DC | Eduardo Frei Ruiz-Tagle |
| | Mario Fernández Baeza | 11 March 2000 | 7 January 2002 | DC | Ricardo Lagos |
| | Michelle Bachelet Jeria | 7 January 2002 | 1 October 2004 | PS | Ricardo Lagos |
| | Jaime Ravinet De La Fuente | 1 October 2004 | 11 March 2006 | DC | Ricardo Lagos |
| | Vivianne Blanlot Soza | 11 March 2006 | 27 March 2007 | PPD | Michelle Bachelet |
| | José Goñi | 27 March 2007 | 12 March 2009 | PPD | Michelle Bachelet |
| | Francisco Vidal Salinas | 12 March 2009 | 11 March 2010 | PPD | Michelle Bachelet |
| | Jaime Ravinet de la Fuente | 11 March 2010 | 14 January 2011 | Ind. | Sebastián Piñera |
| | Andrés Allamand Zavala | 16 January 2011 | 5 November 2012 | RN | Sebastián Piñera |
| | Rodrigo Hinzpeter Kirgberg | 5 November 2012 | 11 March 2014 | RN | Sebastián Piñera |
| | Jorge Burgos Varela | 11 March 2014 | 11 May 2015 | DC | Michelle Bachelet |
| | José Antonio Gómez Urrutia | 11 May 2015 | 11 March 2018 | PR | Michelle Bachelet |
| | Alberto Espina Otero | 11 March 2018 | 28 July 2020 | RN | Sebastián Piñera |
| | Mario Desbordes Jiménez | 28 July 2020 | 18 December 2020 | RN | Sebastián Piñera |
| | Baldo Prokurica | 18 December 2020 | 11 March 2022 | RN | Sebastián Piñera |
| | Maya Fernández | 11 March 2022 | 10 March 2025 | PS | Gabriel Boric |
| | Adriana Delpiano | 10 March 2025 | 11 March 2026 | PPD | Gabriel Boric |
| | Fernando Barros | 11 March 2026 | Incumbent | Ind. | José Antonio Kast |

== See also ==
- Military of Chile
- Defence Diplomacy
