= 1873 in Chile =

- Decades: 1850s; 1860s; 1870s; 1880s; 1890s
- See also: Other events of 1873; Timeline of Chilean history

The following lists events that happened during 1873 in Chile.

== Incumbents ==
- President of Chile: Federico Errázuriz Zañartu

== Events ==
=== February ===
- 27 February - The Santiago Severín Library is founded.

== Births ==
- 7 January - Maximiliano Poblete (d. 1946)
- 24 December - Pedro Dartnell (d. 1944)

== Deaths ==
- 9 June - Francisco Javier Ovalle Bezanilla
