= 1866 in Chile =

- Decades: 1840s; 1850s; 1860s; 1870s; 1880s
- See also: Other events of 1866; Timeline of Chilean history

Events in the year 1866 in Chile.

== Incumbents ==
- President: José Joaquín Pérez

== Events ==
- February 7 - Battle of Abtao
- March 6 - Capture of the Paquete de Maule
- March 31 - Bombardment of Valparaíso
- August 22 - Chincha Islands War: Action of 22 August 1866
- Chilean presidential election, 1866

== Deaths ==
- José Raymundo Del Río, Chilean politician (born 1783)
