= 1872 in Chile =

- Decades: 1850s; 1860s; 1870s; 1880s; 1890s
- See also: Other events of 1872; Timeline of Chilean history

The following lists events that happened during 1872 in Chile.

== Incumbents ==
- President of Chile: Federico Errázuriz Zañartu

== Events ==
- date unknown - The shipping company CSAV is founded.
- date unknown - Recaredo Santos Tornero published in Paris Chile Ilustrado. First illustrated album of the country.

== Births ==
- 6 December - Ramón Briones Luco (d. 1949)

== Deaths ==
- 4 May - Manuel García Banqueda (b. 1803)
- December - José Domingo Bezanilla (b. 1788)
