= 1886 in Chile =

- Decades: 1860s; 1870s; 1880s; 1890s; 1900s
- See also: Other events of 1886; Timeline of Chilean history

The following lists events that happened during 1886 in Chile.

== Incumbents ==
- President of Chile: Domingo Santa María (until September 18), José Manuel Balmaceda

== Events ==
=== June ===
- 15 June - Chilean presidential election, 1886

== Births ==
- date unknown - Oscar Novoa
- 21 August - Max Jara (d. 1965)

== Deaths ==
- 25 January - Benjamín Vicuña Mackenna (b. 1831)
- 13 May - Patricio Lynch (b. 1825)
- 5 June - Antonio Varas (b. 1817)
- 3 September - José Miguel Barriga Castro (b. 1816)
- 6 September - Vicente Pérez Rosales (b. 1807)
