= 1888 in Chile =

- Decades: 1860s; 1870s; 1880s; 1890s; 1900s
- See also: Other events of 1888; Timeline of Chilean history

The following lists events that happened during 1888 in Chile.

== Incumbents ==
- President of Chile: José Manuel Balmaceda

== Events ==
- date unknown – Antofagasta PLC is established.
- date unknown – The Society for the Protection of Women is founded in Santiago by Juana Roldán

== Births ==
- date unknown - Germán Ignacio Riesco (d. 1958)
- 17 May - Arturo Merino Benítez (d. 1970)
- 10 November - Juan Antonio Ríos (d. 1946)

== Deaths ==
- 22 January - Miguel Luis Amunátegui (b. 1828)

=== Date unknown ===
- Francisco de Paula Donoso Vergara (b. 1807)
