= Battle of San Juan and Chorrillos order of battle =

This is the order of battle for the Battle of San Juan and Chorrillos on 13 January 1881 during the War of the Pacific.

== Chilean Operations Army ==
Commander in Chief of the Chilean Army: GLD Manuel Baquedano González (37)
Total strength: 23,179 men

- Chief of Staff: GLB Marcos Maturana (48)
- General Inspector of the Army: GLB Cornelio Saavedra Rodríguez (6)
- Commander of Artillery: Col. Jose Velasquez Borquez (6)
- Commander of Cavalry: Lt. Col. Emeterio Letelier (6)
- Sanitary Service Superintendent: Dr. Ramón Allende Padín (241)
  - 1° Ambulance
  - 2° Ambulance
  - 3° Ambulance
- Logistic and Transport Services: Col. Francisco Bascuñán (140)

=== I Division ===
Commodore Patricio Lynch Solo de Zaldívar, Chilean Navy (6)
Chief of Staff: Col. Gregorio Urrutia, Chilean Army (15)
Strength: 9.295 men

- 1st Infantry Brigade Col. Juan Martinez (3)
  - 2nd Line Infantry Regiment (Lt. Col. Estanislao del Canto) (980)
  - Atacama Infantry Regiment (Col. Juan Martinez) (1.174)
  - Colchagua Infantry Regiment (Lt. Col. Manuel Soffia) (854)
  - Talca Infantry Regiment (Lt. Col. Silvertre Urizar) (1.184)
  - Marine Artillery Regiment (Lt. Col. Vidaurre) (360)
  - Melipilla Infantry Battalion (Lt. Col. Vicente Balmaceda) (451)
- 2nd Infantry Brigade Col. Jose Domingo Amunategui
  - 4th Line Infantry Regiment (Col. Luis Solo de Zaldivar)
  - "Chacabuco" Infantry Regiment (Col. Domingo de Toro Herrera)
  - Coquimbo Infantry Regiment (Lt. Col. Jose Maria 2º Soto)

=== II Division ===
Col. Emilio Sotomayor Baeza
Strength: 5,970 men

- 1st Brigade Col. Jose Francisco Gana
  - "Buin" 1st Line Infantry Regiment (Lt. Col. Juan Leon Garcia)
  - "Esmeralda" Infantry Regiment (Lt Col. Adolfo Holley)
  - Chillán Infantry Regiment (Lt. Col. Pedro Guiñez)
- 2nd Brigade Col. Orozimbo Barbosa
  - Lautaro Infantry Regiment (Lt. Col. Eulogio Robles)
  - Curicó Infantry Battalion
  - Victoria Infantry Battalion

=== III Division ===
Col. Pedro Lagos
Strength:

- 1st Brigade Col. Martiniano Urriola
  - Aconcagua Infantry Regiment
  - Navales Infantry Battalion
- 2nd Brigade Col. Francisco Barceló
  - Concepción Infantry Regiment
  - "Santiago" Infantry Regiment (Col. Demófilo Fuenzalida)
  - Bulnes Infantry Battalion
  - Valdivia Infantry Battalion
  - Caupolican Infantry Battalion (Col. José M. del Canto)

=== Reserve ===
Col. Aristides Martínez
Strength:

- 3rd Line Infantry Regiment (Col. Ricardo Castro)
- Valparaíso Infantry Regiment (Lt. Col. Marchant)
- Zapadores Infantry Regiment (Lt. Col. Zilleruelo)

== Peruvian Army ==
Supreme Commander in Chief: President Nicolás de Piérola

- Chief of the General Staff: Gen. Pedro Silva

=== North Army ===
Gen. Ramón Vargas Machuca

==== I Army Corps ====
Col. Manuel Iglesias

- 1st North Division Col. Mariano Noriega
  - 1st Peruvian Guards Infantry Battalion
  - Cajamarca No.3 Infantry Battalion
  - Ayacucho "9th December" 5th Infantry Battalion
- 2nd North Division Col. Manuel Regino Cano
  - Tarma No.7 Infantry Battalion
  - 9th Infantry Battalion Callao
  - Libres de Trujillo No.11 Infantry Battalion
- 3rd North Division Col. Pablo Arguedas
  - 13th Infantry Battalion "Junin"
  - 15th Infantry Battalion Ica
  - Libres de Cajamarca No.21 Infantry Battalion

==== II Army Corps ====
Col. Belisario Suarez

- 4th North Division Col. Buenaventura Aguirre
  - Huanuco No.17 Infantry Battalion
  - Paucarpata No.19 Infantry Battalion
  - Jauja No.23 Infantry Battalion
- 5th North Division Col. Benigno Cano
  - Ancash No.25 Infantry Battalion
  - Concepción No.27 Infantry Battalion
  - Zepita or Zuavos No.29 Infantry Battalion

=== Center Army ===
Col. Juan Nepomuceno Vargas

==== III Army Corps ====
Col. Justo Pastor Dávila

- 3rd Center Division Col. Cesar Canevaro
  - 67th Infantry Battalion Piura
  - 23 December No.69 Infantry Battalion
  - Libertad No.71 Infantry Battalion
- 5th Center Division Col. Fabian Merino
  - 85th Cajamarca Ranger Battalion
  - Unión No.87 Infantry Battalion
  - 89th Junín Rifle Infantry Battalion
- Light Division Col. Manuel C. Bustamante, Peruvian Civil Guard
  - A and C Corps, Civil Guard
  - D and E Corps, Civil Guard
  - B Corps, Civil Guard

==== IV Army Corps ====
Col. Andrés Avelino Cáceres

- 1st Center Division Col. Domingo Oyarza
  - 61st Lima Infantry Battalion
  - Canta No.63 Infantry Battalion
  - 28 July No.65 Infantry Battalion
- 2nd Center Division Col. Manuel Pereyra
  - Pichincha No.73 Infantry Battalion
  - Piérola No.75 Infantry Battalion
  - La Mar No.77 Infantry Battalion
- 4th Center Division Col. Lorenzo Iglesias
  - Arica No.79 Infantry Battalion
  - Manco Cápac No.81 Infantry Battalion
  - 83rd Ayachucho Infantry Battalion
