= Esteban Orlando Harrington =

Chilean-American engineer and architect (1873–1936)

- Born: Esteban Orlando Fernando Harrington Arellano; 1873; Valparaíso, Chile
- Died: 1936 (aged 73); Valparaíso, Chile
- Spouse: Cruz Castro de Harrington
- Children: 3

Esteban Orlando Fernando Harrington Arellano (1873–1936) was a Chilean-American engineer and architect. Following the 1906 Valparaíso earthquake, Harrington designed and built over 20 buildings in the Port of Valparaiso.

== Biography ==
Harrington was born in 1873 in Valparaíso to William Harrington Moss, the United States Vice-Consul, and Protasia Arellano, a Chilean. One of five siblings, Harrington was the brother of the engineer and architect Ricardo Harrington.

Harrington and his brother Ricardo operated offices in both Valparaiso and Santiago. Harrington focused primarily on architectural design and construction, whilst Richardo operated as a structural engineer. Following the 1906 Valparaíso earthquake the brothers had a great hand in rebuilding the city, with Harrington designing and building over 20 buildings in the Port of Valparaiso. At least five of buildings designed by Harrington before the 1906 earthquake did not suffer significant damage, and have survived the subsequent 1965, 1971, 1985, and 2010 earthquakes without undergoing significant structural reinforcements.

Harrington's work is characterized by the adaptation of the style of Victorian architecture to the topography of Valparaiso, in a similar fashion to the Colonial Victorian construction styles used in San Francisco.

== Personal life ==
Harrington was married to Cruz Castro de Harrington, with whom he had three children.

In 1936, Harrington died in Valparaiso aged 73 after being hit by a tram.

== Selected Works ==
- Hotel Royal, Valparaíso
- South American Steam Boats Company Building, 895 Blanco Street, Valparaíso
- Residential complex in Pasaje Harrington, on Playa Ancha, between 1908 and 1910.
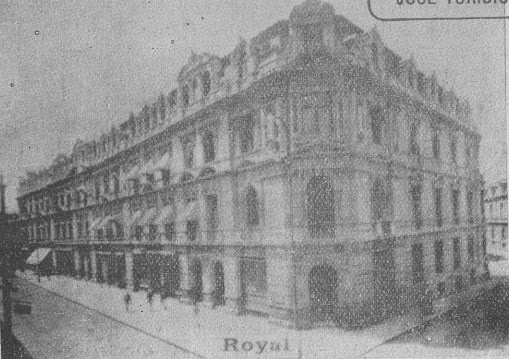
Hotel Royal

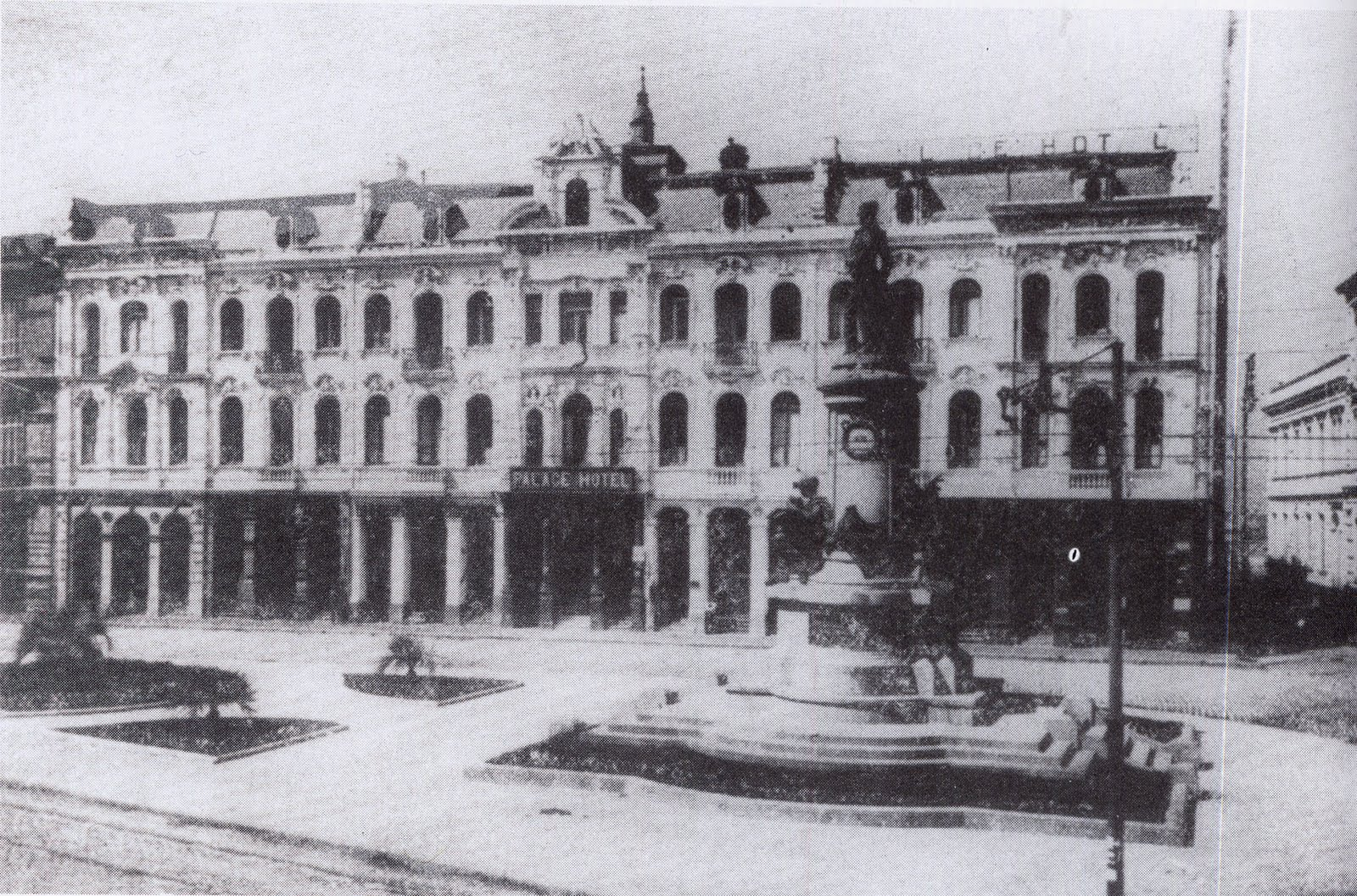
Palace Hotel

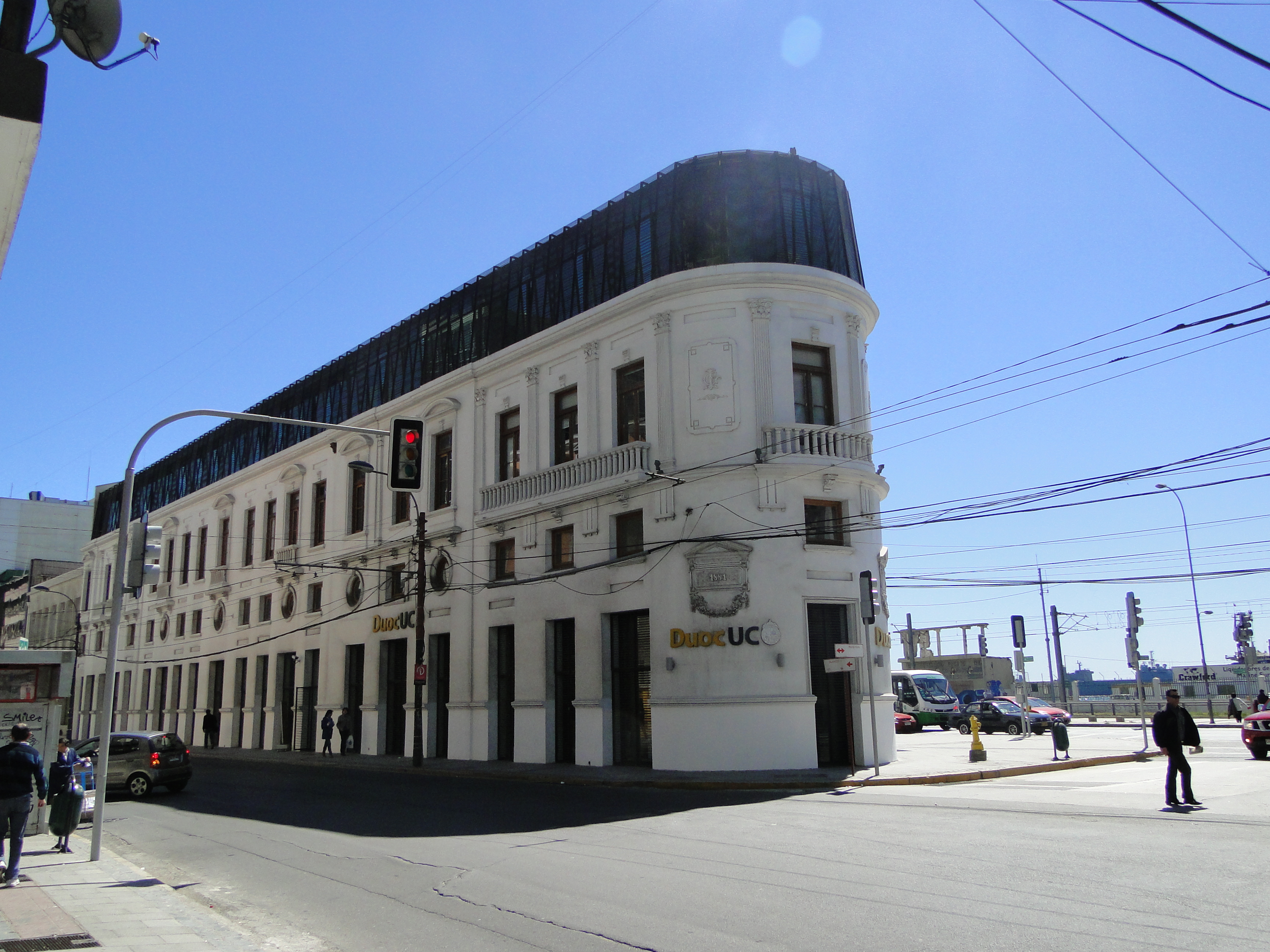
Luis Cousiño Building

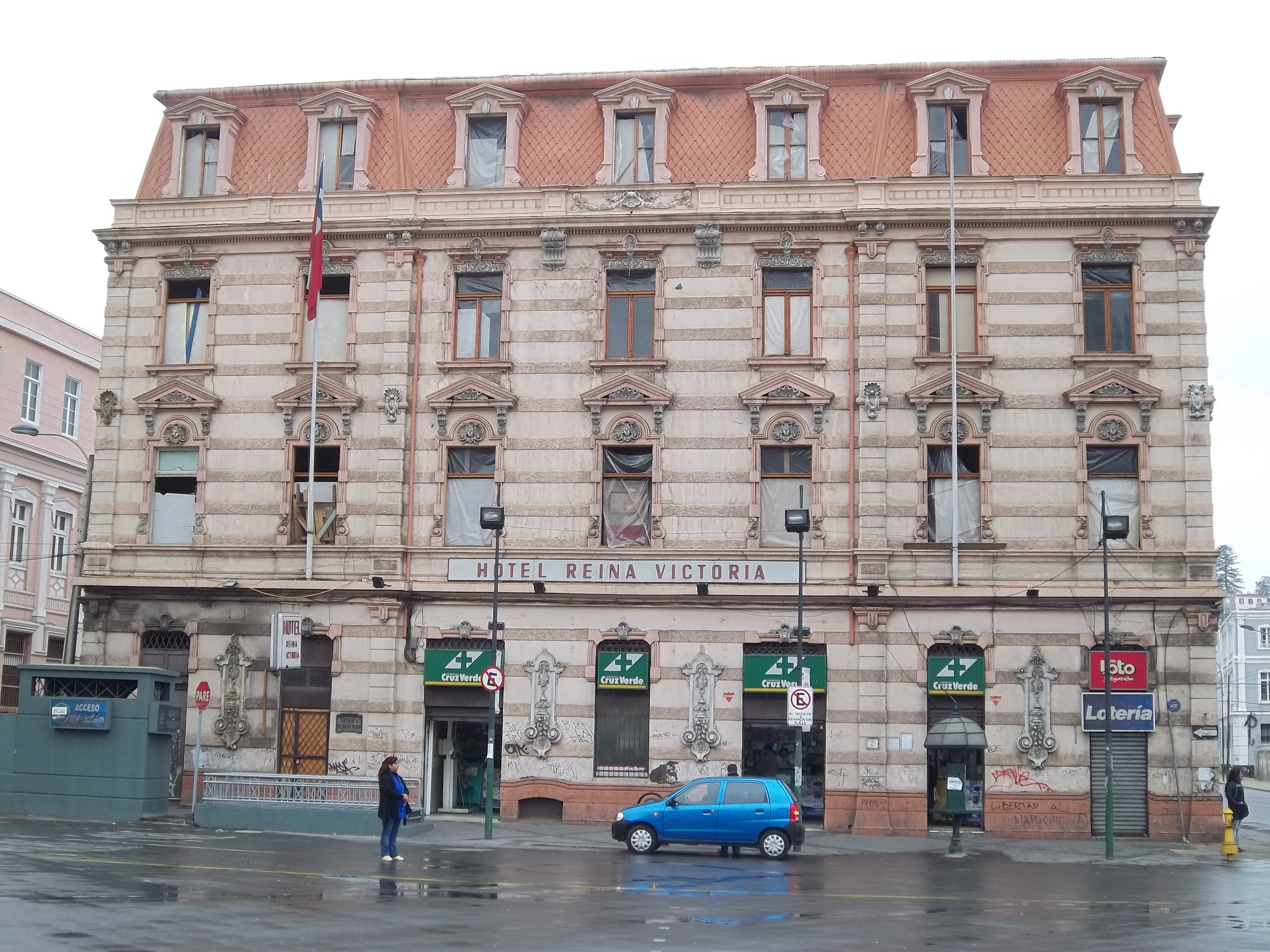
Hotel Reina Victoria Hotel
