= 1864 in Chile =

- Decades: 1840s; 1850s; 1860s; 1870s; 1880s
- See also: Other events of 1864; Timeline of Chilean history

The following lists events that happened during 1864 in Chile.

== Incumbents ==
- President of Chile: José Joaquín Pérez

== Events ==
- Chincha Islands War

== Deaths ==
- 20 January - José Francisco Gana (born 1791)
