= 1875 in Chile =

- Decades: 1850s; 1860s; 1870s; 1880s; 1890s
- See also: Other events of 1875; Timeline of Chilean history

The following lists events that happened during 1875 in Chile.

== Incumbents ==
- President of Chile: Federico Errázuriz Zañartu

== Events ==
- date unknown - The Liberal Party (Chile, 1875-1891) is founded.
- 16 September Chilean International Exhibition opens

== Births ==
- 18 March - Manuel Trucco (d. 1931)
- 12 May - Pedro Pablo Caro (d. 1959)
- 29 October - Rebeca Matte (d. 1929)

== Deaths ==
- 23 November - José María de la Cruz (b. 1799)
