= José María de la Cruz =

Chilean soldier (1799–1875)

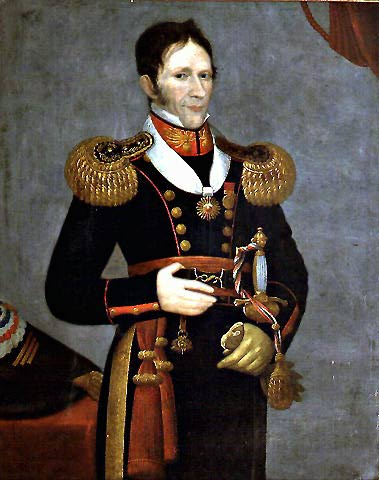
- Portrait by José Gil de Castro

Navy General Commander
- In office 1842–1843
- Preceded by: Victorino Garrido
- Succeeded by: Robert Simpson
- In office 1829–1831
- Preceded by: Francisco de la Lastra
- Succeeded by: José Matías López

Minister of War and Navy
- In office 1841–1842
- Preceded by: Manuel Montt
- Succeeded by: José Santiago Aldunate
- In office 1830–1831
- Preceded by: José María Benavente
- Succeeded by: Diego Portales

Personal details
- Born: March 25, 1799 Concepción, Viceroyalty of Peru
- Died: November 23, 1875 (aged 76) Concepción, Chile
- Spouse: Josefa Zañartu Trujillo
- Children: Delfina de la Cruz
- Parents: Luis de la Cruz; Josefa Prieto Sotomayor

Military service
- Allegiance: Chile
- Branch/service: Chilean Navy
- Rank: Divisional General
- Battles/wars: Chilean War of Independence; Battle of Chacabuco; Battle of Maipú; Chilean Civil War of 1829–30; Battle of Lircay; War of the Confederation; Battle of Portada de Guías; Battle of Yungay; Revolution of 1851; Battle of Loncomilla

General José María de la Cruz Prieto (Concepción, March 25, 1799 – November 23, 1875) was a Chilean soldier.

The son of Luis de la Cruz and of Josefa Prieto Sotomayor, and was a cousin of future presidents José Joaquín Prieto and Manuel Bulnes. He joined the Army on October 27, 1811, and participated actively in the battles of Chacabuco, Maipu and Pangal during the Chilean War of Independence. He married Josefa Zañartu Trujillo, and had a single daughter: Delfina de la Cruz Zañartu who in turn was the wife of future president Aníbal Pinto.

During the War of the Confederation, he was the under-commandant-in-chief of the Restoration Army, under General Manuel Bulnes, having special participation in the victory of Yungay.

After the war, he was Intendant of Valparaíso and later, of Concepción. He ran for president in 1851, but was defeated by Manuel Montt. His defeat caused him to revolt in the southern provinces, starting the 1851 revolution. His cousin Manuel Bulnes crushes the revolutionary attempt and signs the treaty of Purapel with the revolutionaries.

After that he retired from politics, dying in Concepcion at the age of 76.

Political offices
Preceded by José María Benavente	Minister of War and Navy; 1830-1831	Succeeded by Diego Portales
Preceded by Manuel Montt	Minister of War and Navy; 1841-1842	Succeeded by José Santiago Aldunate
Military offices
Preceded by Francisco de la Lastra	Navy General Commander; 1829-1831	Succeeded by José Matías López
Preceded by Victorino Garrido	Navy General Commander; 1842-1843	Succeeded by Robert Simpson
