= 1883 in Chile =

- Decades: 1860s; 1870s; 1880s; 1890s; 1900s
- See also: Other events of 1883; Timeline of Chilean history

The following lists events that happened during 1883 in Chile.

== Incumbents ==
- President of Chile: Domingo Santa María

== Events ==
=== July ===
- 10 July - Battle of Huamachuco

=== October ===
- 20 October - Treaty of Ancón

=== Unknown ===
- Ratonera Building

== Births ==
- date unknown - Jerónimo Lagos Lisboa (d. 1958)
