= Valdovinos =

Valdovinos may refer to:

== People ==
- Carlos Valdovinos (1899−1966), Chilean politician
- Carlos Fernández Valdovinos (born 1965), Paraguayan economist
- César Valdovinos (born 1986), Mexican footballer
- Viviana Valdovinos (born 1974), Paraguayan tennis player

== Other uses ==
- Carlos Valdovinos metro station, metro station in Chile
