= Barriga =

Barriga (Belly in the Spanish language) is a surname. Notable people with the surname include:

- Cecilia Barriga (born 1957), Chilean film director
- Enrique Soro Barriga (1884–1954), Chilean composer
- Gonzalo Barriga (born 1984), Chilean footballer
- José Miguel Barriga Castro (1816–1886), Chilean lawyer and politician
- Mark Anthony Barriga (born 1993), Filipino boxer
- Rogelio Barriga Rivas (1912–1961), Mexican writer
