= 1868 in Chile =

- Decades: 1840s; 1850s; 1860s; 1870s; 1880s
- See also: Other events of 1868; Timeline of Chilean history

The following lists events that happened during 1868 in Chile.

== Incumbents ==
- President of Chile: José Joaquín Pérez

== Events ==
=== June ===
- 7 June - The Presbyterian Church in Chile is founded. It is the first Protestant church in Chile.

== Births ==
- date unknown - Aníbal Rodríguez (d. 1930)
- 8 January - Henry Gollan (d. 1949)
- 27 February - Pedro Balmaceda (d. 1889)
- 31 July - Emilio Bello (d. 1963)
- 20 December - Arturo Alessandri (d. 1950)

== Deaths ==
- 10 June - Antonio José de Irisarri (b. 1786)
