= 1881 in Chile =

- Decades: 1860s; 1870s; 1880s; 1890s; 1900s
- See also: Other events of 1881; Timeline of Chilean history

The following lists events that happened during 1881 in Chile.

== Incumbents ==
- President of Chile: Aníbal Pinto (until September 18), Domingo Santa María

== Events ==
=== January ===
- 15 January - Battle of Miraflores
- 17 January - Occupation of Lima

=== June ===
- 15 June - Chilean presidential election, 1881

=== July ===
- 23 July - Boundary Treaty of 1881 between Chile and Argentina

== Deaths ==
- 13 January - Robert Souper (b. [[1818 in Chile]1818]])

=== Undated ===
- José Eusebio Barros Baeza (b. 1810)
