= 1871 in Chile =

- Decades: 1850s; 1860s; 1870s; 1880s; 1890s
- See also: Other events of 1871; Timeline of Chilean history

The following lists events that happened during 1871 in Chile.

== Incumbents ==
- President of Chile: José Joaquín Pérez (until September 18), Federico Errázuriz Zañartu

== Events ==
=== June ===
- 15 June - Chilean presidential election, 1871

=== October ===
- 6 October - Corpbanca begins business.

== Births ==
- 25 January - Juan Pablo Bennett (d. 1951)
- 4 August - Enrique Molina Garmendia (d. 1964)

== Deaths ==
- 29 August - Marcos Maturana (b. 1802)
