= 1862 in Chile =

- Decades: 1840s; 1850s; 1860s; 1870s; 1880s
- See also: Other events of 1862; Timeline of Chilean history

The following lists events that happened during 1862 in Chile.

== Incumbents ==
- President of Chile: José Joaquín Pérez

== Events ==
- date unknown - Cornelio Saavedra Rodríguez advances to Malleco.

== Births ==
- 17 January - Javier Ángel Figueroa (d. 1945)

== Deaths ==
- 20 August - Javiera Carrera (b. 1781)
