= 1867 in Chile =

- Decades: 1840s; 1850s; 1860s; 1870s; 1880s
- See also: Other events of 1867; Timeline of Chilean history

The following lists events that happened during 1867 in Chile.

== Incumbents ==
- President of Chile: José Joaquín Pérez

== Births ==
- 9 April – Chris Watson (d. 1941)
- 5 July – Luis Altamirano (d. 1938)
- 30 August – William Price (d. 1924)

== Deaths ==
- date unknown - José Anacleto Montt Goyenechea (b. 1802)
- 3 November - Segundo Ruiz Belvis (b. 1829)
