= 1887 in Chile =

- Decades: 1860s; 1870s; 1880s; 1890s; 1900s
- See also: Other events of 1887; Timeline of Chilean history

The following lists events that happened during 1887 in Chile.

== Incumbents ==
- President of Chile: José Manuel Balmaceda

== Events ==
=== November ===
- 20 November - The radical left wing Democrat Party is founded.

== Births ==
- date unknown - Otto Junge (d. 1978)
- 27 February - Ernesto Balmaceda (d. 1906)
- 14 May - Carlos Frödden (d. 1976)
- 15 September - Carlos Dávila (d. 1955)
- 25 September - Jerónimo Méndez (d. 1959)

== Deaths ==
- 24 November - Carlos Condell (b. 1843)
