= 1878 in Chile =

- Decades: 1850s; 1860s; 1870s; 1880s; 1890s
- See also: Other events of 1878; Timeline of Chilean history

The following lists events that happened during 1878 in Chile.

== Incumbents ==
- President of Chile: Aníbal Pinto

== Events ==
=== December ===
- December - Chile dispatches a warship to Antofagasta.

== Births ==
- 17 June - Agustín Edwards Mac-Clure (d. 1941)
- 6 July - Marmaduke Grove (d. 1954)

== Deaths ==
- 8 June - Rafael Valentín Valdivieso (b. 1804)
