= Vivianne Blanlot =

Chilean economist and politician

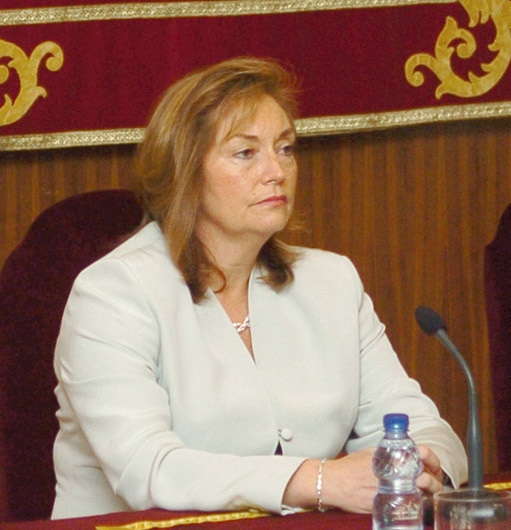
- Vivianne Blanlot in 2006

Minister of National Defense of Chile
- In office 11 March 2006 – 27 March 2007
- President: Michelle Bachelet
- Preceded by: Jaime Ravinet
- Succeeded by: José Goñi

Personal details
- Born: Vivianne Amelia Blanlot Soza; 22 October 1956 (age 69) La Serena, Chile
- Party: Party for Democracy; Amarillos por Chile
- Children: 3
- Education: Pontifical Catholic University of Chile; American University (MA)
- Profession: Economist

Vivianne Amelia Blanlot Soza (born October 22, 1956, in La Serena, Chile) is a Chilean economist and politician. Her father Jorge Enrique Blanlot was an Army captain, and her grandfather General Enrique Blanlot Reisig. She has a degree in economics from the Pontifical Catholic University of Chile and MA in the same discipline applied by the American University in the United States.

== Biography ==
Between 1980 and 1990 she served as an economist in charge of the evaluation of investments and programs in the area of energy, mining, water and road infrastructure in the Inter-American Development Bank (IDB). She was executive director of the National Environmental Commission (CONAMA) between 1995 and 1997 in Chile.

=== Political career ===
In 2000 she took over as executive secretary of the National Energy Commission (CNE), serving until 2003, after differences of opinion with the minister, Jorge Rodríguez Grossi. In 2005 she joined the board of BancoEstado and worked as a consultant in the areas of energy and environment for telecommunications company IGT.

In 2006 President Michelle Bachelet appointed her as Minister of National Defense. She acted as the only government representative at the funeral of former dictator Augusto Pinochet, where she faced boos from Pinochet supporters. She was replaced by José Goñi Carrasco in March 2007.

In late 2011 she was appointed as a member of the Council for Transparency. In 2012 she joined the board of Colbún, a Chilean power generation and trading company.

== Personal life ==
She married twice, first to Oscar Alvarez; after his death she married, and later separated from, Enrique Mendez.
