= 1880 in Chile =

- Decades: 1860s; 1870s; 1880s; 1890s; 1900s
- See also: Other events of 1880; Timeline of Chilean history

Events in the year 1880 in Chile.

== Incumbents ==
- President: Aníbal Pinto

== Events ==
- March 22 – Battle of Los Ángeles
- May 26 – Battle of Tacna
- June 7 – Battle of Arica

== Births ==
- Enrique Balmaceda (d. 1962)
