= 1865 in Chile =

- Decades: 1840s; 1850s; 1860s; 1870s; 1880s
- See also: Other events of 1865; Timeline of Chilean history

The following lists events that happened during 1865 in Chile.

== Incumbents ==
- President of Chile: José Joaquín Pérez

== Events ==
=== November ===
- 26 November - Battle of Papudo

== Births ==
- date unknown - Tomás Guevara (d. 1935)
- 1 April - Irene Morales (d. 1890)

== Deaths ==
- date unknown - Joaquín Tocornal (b. 1788)
- 28 November - José Manuel Pareja (b. 1813)
