= 1879 in Chile =

- Decades: 1850s; 1860s; 1870s; 1880s; 1890s
- See also: Other events of 1879; Timeline of Chilean history

Events in the year 1879 in Chile.

== Incumbents ==
- President: Aníbal Pinto

== Events ==
- March 23 – Battle of Topáter
- April 12 – Battle of Chipana
- May 21 – Battle of Iquique and Battle of Punta Gruesa
- October 8 – Battle of Angamos
- November 2 – Battle of Pisagua
- November 23 – Battle of San Francisco
- November 27 – Battle of Tarapacá

== Births ==
- 6 February – Pedro Aguirre Cerda, thirtieth president of Chile (d. 1941)
- 12 February – Juan Esteban Montero, politician (d. 1948)
- 1 July – Ignacio Urrutia Manzano, politician (d. 1951)

== Deaths ==
- May 21 – Arturo Prat, lawyer and navy officer (b. 1848)

== See also ==
- War of the Pacific
