= 1876 in Chile =

- Decades: 1850s; 1860s; 1870s; 1880s; 1890s
- See also: Other events of 1876; Timeline of Chilean history

The following lists events that happened during 1876 in Chile.

== Incumbents ==
- President of Chile: Federico Errázuriz Zañartu (until September 18), Aníbal Pinto

== Events ==
=== January ===
- 16 January Chilean International Exhibition closes

=== June ===
- 15 June - Chilean presidential election, 1876

== Births ==
- 6 July - Luis Emilio Recabarren (d. 1924)
- 20 July - Pedro Opaso (d. 1957)

== Deaths ==
- 5 September - Manuel Blanco Encalada (b. 1790)
