= Pedro Vidal Gómez =

Chilean military officer and politician (1790–1856)

Pedro Nolasco Vidal Gómez (31 January 1790 – 30 April 1856), commonly known as Pedro Vidal Gómez, was a Chilean military officer and politician.

He fought in the Chilean War of Independence, he later served as Minister of War and Navy under presidents Manuel Bulnes and Manuel Montt. He was a long-serving member of the Chamber of Deputies of Chile, which he briefly presided over in 1846.
