= 1870 in Chile =

- Decades: 1850s; 1860s; 1870s; 1880s; 1890s
- See also: Other events of 1870; Timeline of Chilean history

The following lists events that happened during 1870 in Chile.

== Incumbents ==
- President of Chile: José Joaquín Pérez

== Events ==
=== May ===
- May - The Chilean Army resumes operations against the Mapuches

== Births ==
- date unknown - Francisco Adriano Caro

== Deaths ==
- 28 March - Candelaria Pérez (b. 1810)
