= 1863 in Chile =

- Decades: 1840s; 1850s; 1860s; 1870s; 1880s
- See also: Other events of 1863; Timeline of Chilean history

The following lists events that happened during 1863 in Chile.

== Incumbents ==
- President of Chile: José Joaquín Pérez

== Events ==
=== December ===
- 8 December - Church of the Company Fire

== Births ==
- 27 June - Fred Dennett (d. 1928)
- 3 August - Francisco Nef (d. 1931)
- 13 October - Joaquín Figueroa (d. 1929)
