= 1869 in Chile =

- Decades: 1840s; 1850s; 1860s; 1870s; 1880s
- See also: Other events of 1869; Timeline of Chilean history

The following lists events that happened during 1869 in Chile.

== Incumbents ==
- President of Chile: José Joaquín Pérez

== Births ==
- 29 August - Alberto Valenzuela Llanos (d. 1925)

== Deaths ==
- 14 July - Isidora Zegers (b. 1803)
