= Victorino Garrido =

Chilean politician

Deputy of the Republic of Chile (Representing Valparaíso)
- In office 1837–1840
- Preceded by: Juan Agustín Cabezas
- Succeeded by: Manuel García Banqueda

Deputy of the Republic of Chile (Representing Copiapó, Chañaral y Freirina)
- In office 1840–1855
- Succeeded by: Manuel Antonio Matta

Personal details
- Born: 1779 Castilla la Vieja
- Died: July 6, 1864(85 aged) Copiapó
- Party: Liberal Party

Victorino Garrido Hernández was a Chilean soldier and politician born in Spain. He was a deputy representing Valparaíso (1837–1840) and Copiapó, Chañaral and Freirina (1840–1855).

== Biography ==
In 1818 he landed in Talcahuano, as royal commissioner of the remains of the last Spanish expedition sent as reinforcement to America, however, shortly after disembarking, he deserted the royalist ranks and asked Bernardo O'Higgins to join the Chilean Army. Soon the patriots would appoint him commissioner of Valparaíso.

He was a friend and advisor to Bernardo O'Higgins, José Joaquín Prieto, Diego Portales and Manuel Bulnes.

He was a journalist, Chilean diplomat to the government of Peru, colonel, deputy, queller of the Copiapó revolution, liquidator of Peruvian accounts, among other positions. After the expedition carried out by Freire, which according to Peruvian historian Jorge Basadre, was carried out with the connivance or support of the presidents of the Peruvian-Bolivian Confederation Luis José de Orbegoso and Andrés de Santa Cruz, and which attempted to overthrow the government established in Chile, as response in 1836 Portales entrusted Garrido with command of the naval expedition that captured the ships of the Peruvian squadron at their anchorage in Callao. In 1838 he was appointed Army Quartermaster for the Peruvian campaign led by Manuel Bulnes. While in that country he was challenged to a duel, publicly and before all the chiefs and officers of the restoration army, by the Chilean colonel Pedro Godoy Palacios, who considered himself insulted by some articles written by Garrido. Garrido shied away from fighting at all times and was injured with fists and kicks by Godoy before he could be subdued by the urban guard.

He was elected deputy for Valparaíso, period 1837 to 1840. Re-elected deputy for the period 1840–1843, this time representing Copiapó, Chañaral and Freirina, a district for which he continued to be deputy in the elections of 1843, 1846, 1849 and 1852. In 1855, he was elected Senator for Coquimbo, a position he held until 1864.
