= 1877 in Chile =

- Decades: 1850s; 1860s; 1870s; 1880s; 1890s
- See also: Other events of 1877; Timeline of Chilean history

The following lists events that happened during 1877 in Chile.

== Incumbents ==
- President of Chile: Aníbal Pinto

== Events ==
=== January ===
- 3 January - The clipper Champion of the Seas is abandoned off Cape Horn

=== May ===
- 9 May - 1877 Iquique earthquake

== Births ==
- 3 November - Carlos Ibáñez del Campo (d. 1960)

== Deaths ==
- 20 July - Federico Errázuriz Zañartu (b. 1825)
