= 1884 in Chile =

- Decades: 1860s; 1870s; 1880s; 1890s; 1900s
- See also: Other events of 1884; Timeline of Chilean history

The following lists events that happened during 1884 in Chile.

== Incumbents ==
- President of Chile: Domingo Santa María

== Events ==
- 4 April - Treaty of Valparaiso

== Births ==
- 11 February - Alfonso Leng (d. 1974)

== Deaths ==
- 9 June - Aníbal Pinto (b. 1825)
