= José Goñi =

Chilean diplomat and politician

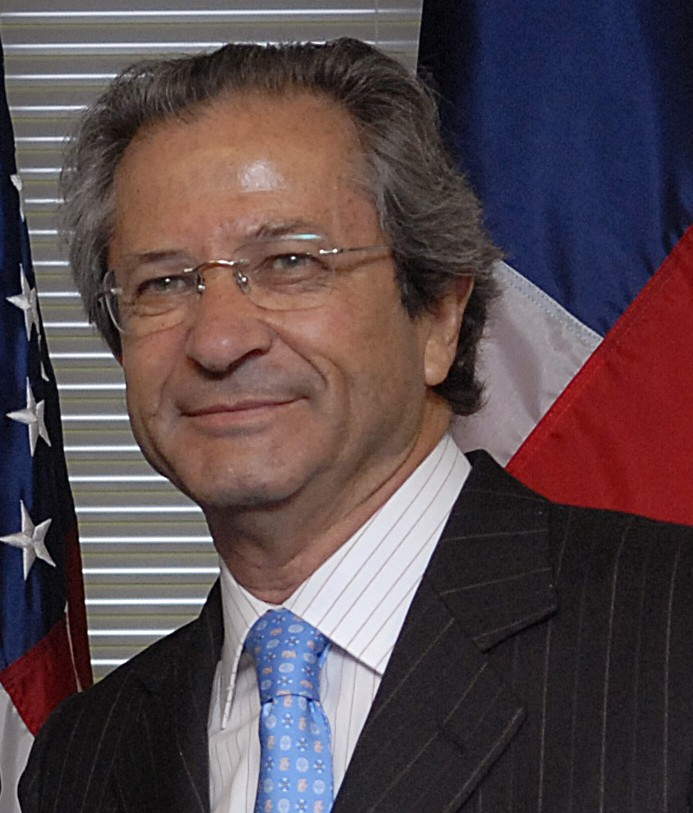
- Goñi at the Pentagon (2007)

Minister of National Defense of Chile
- In office 27 March 2007 – 12 March 2009
- President: Michelle Bachelet
- Preceded by: Vivianne Blanlot
- Succeeded by: Francisco Vidal Salinas

Personal details
- Born: 28 February 1948 (age 78) Concepción, Chile
- Party: Revolutionary Left Movement (MIR); Party for Democracy
- Children: Three
- Education: University of Concepción
- Profession: Economist

José Mario Goñi Carrasco (born 28 February 1948) is a Chilean diplomat and politician, currently appointed ambassador to the United States.

Before this appointment he had served as Minister of National Defense from 2007 to 2009. His previous diplomatic roles include Ambassador to Mexico, Italy and Sweden. He is a graduate in business majoring in economics of the University of Concepción.

== Biography ==
He is the son of Anacleto Segundo Goñi Torres, a descendant of Rear Admiral José Anacleto Goñi Prieto, Commander-in-Chief of the Navy at the outbreak of the War of the Pacific, and Mercedes Carrasco Acuña. In 1997, he married Marcela Angulo González; the couple divorced in 2001.

He completed his secondary education at Liceo Enrique Molina Garmendia in Concepción, where he served as president of the student council in 1966, his final year at the institution. The school had also educated several prominent figures of the local political left, including Miguel Enríquez, Bautista van Schouwen, and Fernando Krauss.

In 1967, he entered the Faculty of Economic and Administrative Sciences at the University of Concepción, where he became the first president of the faculty's student federation to belong to the Revolutionary Left Movement (MIR), which he joined that same year after participating in the Left-Wing University Movement (MUI). Although Goñi became very close to Enríquez, various sources state that he never participated in the killings or armed actions associated with the MIR.

== Political career ==
His activities reportedly focused on mass organizing, particularly among workers, residents, and peasants.

In Stockholm, he taught at the Institute of Latin America and at the University of Stockholm. During this period, he married a Swedish citizen whom he had met in Chile, and distanced himself from the MIR, developing close ties with figures of Nordic social democracy.

Amid this process of reassessment and self-criticism, he became critical of the movement's leadership and did not participate in the so-called Operation Return to Chile promoted by Andrés Pascal Allende in 1977. The plan envisaged the clandestine entry of around one thousand men to confront the dictatorship of Augusto Pinochet through the reorganization of paramilitary cadres.

In 1987, after returning to Chile, his ties with Ricardo Lagos, Sergio Bitar, and others led him to abandon his political independence and become one of the founders of the Party for Democracy (PPD).

=== Concertación era ===
During the administration of Eduardo Frei Ruiz-Tagle, he served as Executive Director of the National Environmental Commission (CONAMA), an institution he had led since its creation.

He later served as Director for Europe in the Economic Affairs Directorate of the Chilean Ministry of Foreign Affairs, from which position he led negotiations with the European Union (EU), culminating in the signing of the agreement in Florence, Italy, in June 1997.

He subsequently served as Chilean ambassador to Sweden (1997–2000), Italy (2000–2004), and Mexico (2005–2007). He also represented Chile before the Food and Agriculture Organization (FAO) and the World Food Programme (WFP), both headquartered in Rome. He additionally served as concurrent ambassador to the Republic of Latvia (1991–2000 and 2004–2008).

On 27 March 2007, President Bachelet appointed him Minister of National Defense. He left office on 12 March 2009.

Between that year and early 2010, he served as his country's representative to the United States.
