= 1874 in Chile =

- Decades: 1850s; 1860s; 1870s; 1880s; 1890s
- See also: Other events of 1874; Timeline of Chilean history

The following lists events that happened during 1874 in Chile.

== Incumbents ==
- President of Chile: Federico Errázuriz Zañartu

== Events ==
=== February ===
- 15 February - The Hospital of San Carlos (Chile) is founded.

== Births ==
- 20 March - Alberto Cabero (d. 1955)
- 25 May - Abraham Oyanedel (d. 1954)
- 25 November - Alberto Edwards (d. 1932)

== Deaths ==
- 24 May - Pedro Félix Vicuña (b. 1805)
