= 1861 in Chile =

- Decades: 1840s; 1850s; 1860s; 1870s; 1880s
- See also: Other events of 1861; Timeline of Chilean history

The following lists events that happened during 1861 in Chile.

== Incumbents ==
- President of Chile: Manuel Montt (until September 18), José Joaquín Pérez

== Events ==
=== July ===
- 16 July - Chilean presidential election, 1861

=== December ===
- December - Occupation of Araucanía

== Births ==
- 10 August - Rafael Valentín Errázuriz (d. 1923)

== Deaths ==
- 23 October - José María Linares (b. 1808)
