= 1889 in Chile =

- Decades: 1860s; 1870s; 1880s; 1890s; 1900s
- See also: Other events of 1889; Timeline of Chilean history

Events in the year 1889 in Chile.

== Incumbents ==
- President: Jose Manuel Balmaceda
- President of the Senate of Chile: Domingo Santa Maria, Adolfo Eastman

== Events ==
- founding of Enersis
- founding of Falabella (retail store)
- founding of S.A.C.I. Falabella

== Births ==
- January 10 - Gabriela Mistral, poet (died 1957)

== Deaths ==
- July 1 - Domingo Santa Maria
