= José Eusebio Barros Baeza =

Chilean lawyer and politician

Parliamentary Representative, Republic of Chile
- In office 1855–1858
- Preceded by: Manuel José de Hurtado
- Succeeded by: Manuel García Banqueda
- Constituency: Department of Bulnes and Department of Yungay

Parliamentary Representative, Republic of Chile
- In office 1858–1861
- Preceded by: Juan Villar Prado
- Succeeded by: Andrés Chacón Barry
- Constituency: Itata Province and Maule Province

Personal details
- Born: 1810 Santiago de Chile, Viceroyalty of Peru
- Died: 1881 (aged 70–71) Santiago de Chile, Chile
- Citizenship: Chile
- Party: National Party
- Occupation: Lawyer

José Eusebio Barros Baeza (1810–1881) was a Chilean lawyer and politician. He was born in Santiago in 1810. He died in the same city in 1881. He was the son of Don Antonio and Dona Barros Grez Deidamia Baeza de la Fuente.

== Education ==
José Eusebio Barros Baeza studied at the Instituto Nacional (the National Institute), where he graduated as a lawyer in 1842. He first worked in the Municipality of Santiago, then went to the Ministry of Justice, Culture and Education, as Secretary (1846).

== Political life ==
A follower of Manuel Montt, Baeza first campaigned for the Conservatives then later moved over to the National Party, of which he was elected deputy by Bulnes (1855-1858) and by Curicó (1858-1861). During these periods he integrated the Standing Committee on Education and Welfare.

He was secretary of the Chamber of Deputies (1855-1856). He was later a member of the Chilean Legation in Rio de Janeiro (1863) and Guatemala (1868). He became Minister of the Court of Appeals of Santiago in 1870.
