= 1885 in Chile =

- Decades: 1860s; 1870s; 1880s; 1890s; 1900s
- See also: Other events of 1885; Timeline of Chilean history

The following lists events that happened during 1885 in Chile.

== Incumbents ==
- President of Chile: Domingo Santa María

== Events ==
=== June ===
- 5 June - The Academia Chilena de la Lengua is founded.

=== October ===
- 22 October - The Independent Liberal Party (Chile) is established.

== Deaths ==
- date unknown - José Zapiola (born 1802)
