= 1860 in Chile =

- Decades: 1840s; 1850s; 1860s; 1870s; 1880s
- See also: Other events of 1860; Timeline of Chilean history

The following lists events that happened during 1860 in Chile.

== Incumbents ==
- President of Chile: Manuel Montt

== Births ==
- date unknown - Hernán Trizano (d. 1926)
- 6 May - Eliodoro Yáñez (d. 1932)

== Deaths ==
- 23 March - Francisco Ruiz-Tagle (b. 1790)
- 17 June - Salvador Sanfuentes (b. 1817)
