= 1882 in Chile =

- Decades: 1860s; 1870s; 1880s; 1890s; 1900s
- See also: Other events of 1882; Timeline of Chilean history

The following lists events that happened during 1882 in Chile.

== Incumbents ==
- President of Chile: Domingo Santa María

== Events ==
About 6,000 European immigrants are registered in the country, as a result of foreign colonization policies.

The Chilean State breaks relations with the Holy See.

Parliamentary elections were conducted in 1882. The elections were not free and fair, with considerable intervention by President Domingo Santa María.

=== February ===
- 5 February - Battle of Pucará

=== July ===
- 9 July - Battle of La Concepción

== Births ==
- 23 April – Augusto d'Halmar, writer, art critic and diplomat (died 1950)
- 18 September - Vernon Steele, Chilean-born British actor (died 1955)
- 20 September - Luis Pardo, navy officer (died 1935)

== Deaths ==
- 20 February - Manuel Camilo Vial, politician (birth 1804)
- 9 July - Ignacio Carrera Pinto, soldier and hero of the War of the Pacific (born 1848)
