= José Raymundo del Río =

Chilean politician and independence patriot (1783–1866)

José Raimundo del Río
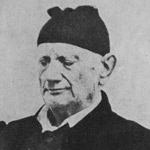

Acting Minister of Finance
- In office 14 January 1842 – 7 May 1842
- President: Manuel Bulnes
- In office 18 September 1841 – 28 October 1841
- President: Manuel Bulnes
- In office 22 December 1840 – 10 February 1841
- President: José Joaquín Prieto
- In office 16 June 1830 – 19 June 1830
- President: José Tomás Ovalle (acting)

Acting Minister of Finance
- In office 2 November 1829 – 3 November 1829
- In office 23 June 1828 – 28 July 1828
- In office 23 October 1826 – 14 May 1827
- In office 6 May 1825 – 18 June 1825
- In office 3 June 1823 – 12 July 1823
- President: Ramón Freire

Personal details
- Born: 1783
- Died: 1866 (aged 82–83) Santiago, Chile
- Parent(s): Gaspar del Río y Arcaya; Nieves de la Cruz y Goyeneche
- Profession: Public official

José Raimundo del Río Cruz (1783–1866) was a Chilean public official and supporter of the Chilean War of Independence.

A longtime official of the Chilean financial administration, he served on numerous occasions as interim or acting Minister of Finance between 1823 and 1842. He worked as an attorney for the city of Santiago and in the customs administration of Valparaíso.

During his political career he functioned as deputy secretary of finance and senior officer. He took over in 1823 as alternate for Senator Concepción (Chile) but was never called to be seated. He also ran to be a civilian member in the Great Convention.

As deputy secretary he served as interim minister of finance, in different periods and separately from 1825 to 1842.

== Education ==
Del Río was born in 1783, the son of Gaspar del Río y Arcaya and Nieves de la Cruz y Goyeneche. He died in Santiago in 1866 at the age of 83.
