= Fernando Elizalde =

Chilean politician

Fernando Elizalde was a Chilean politician. He served as president of the Chamber of Deputies of Chile.
