= José Domingo Bezanilla =

Chilean lawyer and politician

Member of Parliament, the Republic of Chile
- In office 1855–1858
- Preceded by: Manuel Antonio Tocornal Grez
- Succeeded by: Domingo Santa María González
- Constituency: La Serena, Elqui and Coquimbo

Member of Parliament, the Republic of Chile
- In office 1858–1861
- Preceded by: José Victorino Lastarria
- Succeeded by: Juan Esteban Rodríguez Segura
- Constituency: Copiapó, Chañaral and Freirina

Personal details
- Born: February 21, 1788 Santiago de Chile, Viceroyalty of Peru
- Died: 1872 (aged 83–84) Santiago de Chile, Chile
- Citizenship: Chile
- Party: Chile Liberal Party
- Spouse: María Rosa Luco Caldera
- Occupation: Lawyer

José Domingo Bezanilla (1788–1872) was a Chilean lawyer and politician. He was born in Santiago del Nuevo Extremo, on February 21, 1788. He died in the same city in 1872. He was the son of Francisco Bezanilla y de la Bárcena and Juana de Bezanilla y Abós-Padilla. He married Maria Rosa Luco Caldera in 1813.

== Education ==
He studied at the Carolino College and the National Institute, where he graduated in 1818 as a lawyer. He was a member of the Consulate Court (1823), along with Joaquin Gandarillas and Diego Portales.

He was Chief Justice of Santiago (1829). After the Civil War of 1830, he was persecuted and fled north, where he took shelter in La Serena, where he taught history at some local schools. There he formed part of the underground pipiolos leaders group.

== Political career ==
He was elected Member of Parliament for Santiago in 1831, but failed to assume this position in order to protect his life and that of his family. His residence in the capital was burned by conservative forces who assumed command of the country.

There he collaborated on the drafting of various newspapers seeking to undermine the popularity of the regime advocated by Diego Portales.

After the amnesty granted by the government of Manuel Bulnes, he was able to return to Santiago and was elected Member of Parliament for La Serena (1855–1858) and Copiapo (1858–1861), integrating the Standing Committee on Government and Foreign Affairs. He became vice-president of the Chamber of Deputies of Chile in 1859.

Subsequently, the government of Federico Errázuriz Zañartu, appointed him special envoy to the Vatican to negotiate the recognition of national independence (1872). He died in December of that year.
