= Luis Gómez Carreño =

Chilean naval officer (1865–1930)

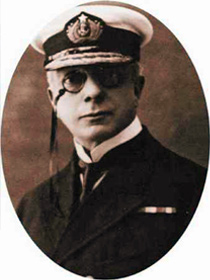
Luis Gómez Carreño

Luis Esteban Gómez Carreño (26 January 1865, isla Guar – 6 January 1930) was a Chilean naval officer. He first joined the navy aged 15 on board the Huáscar, later serving as squadron commander-in-chief. He became director of the Naval School and Minister of War and the Navy under the September Junta.

After the 1906 Valparaíso earthquake, Gómez Carreño ordered the execution by firing squad of at least fifteen people caught looting.

Carreño was involved in a car accident on one of the bends of the 'El Olivar' road between Quilpué and Viña del Mar, which caused his death.
