= Maximiliano Poblete =

Chilean politician

Member of the Senate
- In office 1 March 1926 – 26 April 1926
- Constituency: Tarapacá and Antofagasta

Personal details
- Born: 9 February 1875 Freirina, Chile
- Died: 1 January 1946 (aged 70) Santiago, Chile
- Party: Radical Party
- Spouse: Estela Barh
- Parent(s): José Hilarión Poblete; Carolina Cortés
- Education: University of Chile
- Occupation: Physician

Maximiliano Poblete Cortés (9 February 1875 – 1946) was a Chilean physician and politician who briefly served as senator for Tarapacá and Antofagasta in 1926.

== Biography ==
He was born in Freirina on 9 February 1875, son of José Hilarión Poblete Barros and Carolina Cortés Rojas. His father was appointed administrator of the mines of Pedro Enrique Palazuelos in the Mineral de Caracoles, prompting the family to settle in Antofagasta.

He began his studies at the Liceo de Hombres of Antofagasta and later completed his secondary education at Colegio San Agustín in Santiago. He studied Medicine at the University of Chile and qualified as physician and surgeon in 1898. He then returned to Antofagasta, where he married Estela Barh Mandiola and had eight children: Maximiliano, María Adriana, María del Divino Corazón, Edgardo, Jorge, Gabriela, Raúl and Inés.

He practiced medicine in Antofagasta and was active in the Seguro Obligatorio, focusing on the welfare of nitrate workers. He later settled in Santiago, serving as councilor of the Caja Nacional de Empleados Públicos and of the Sociedad Nacional de Minería (SONAMI). He was delegate of the Colegio Médico de Antofagasta to the national body and vice president of the Asociación Médica at national level.

He died in Santiago at the age of seventy-one.

== Political career ==
He was member of the Radical Party. In Antofagasta he was elected councilor in 1909 and mayor in 1912, serving for a total of eighteen years until 1930. He was granted the title of "Ciudadano Honorario" for his municipal work.

In 1926 he was candidate for senator for the provincial grouping of Tarapacá and Antofagasta (1926–1934). By decision of the Tribunal Calificador he was proclaimed senator on a provisional basis from 1 March 1926 until 26 April 1926, when the definitive proclamation installed Óscar Viel Cavero. During that period he served on the Permanent Commission of Hygiene and Public Assistance.
