= Santiago Severín Library =

Public library in Valparaíso, Chile

Coordinates: 33°02′42″S 71°37′10″W

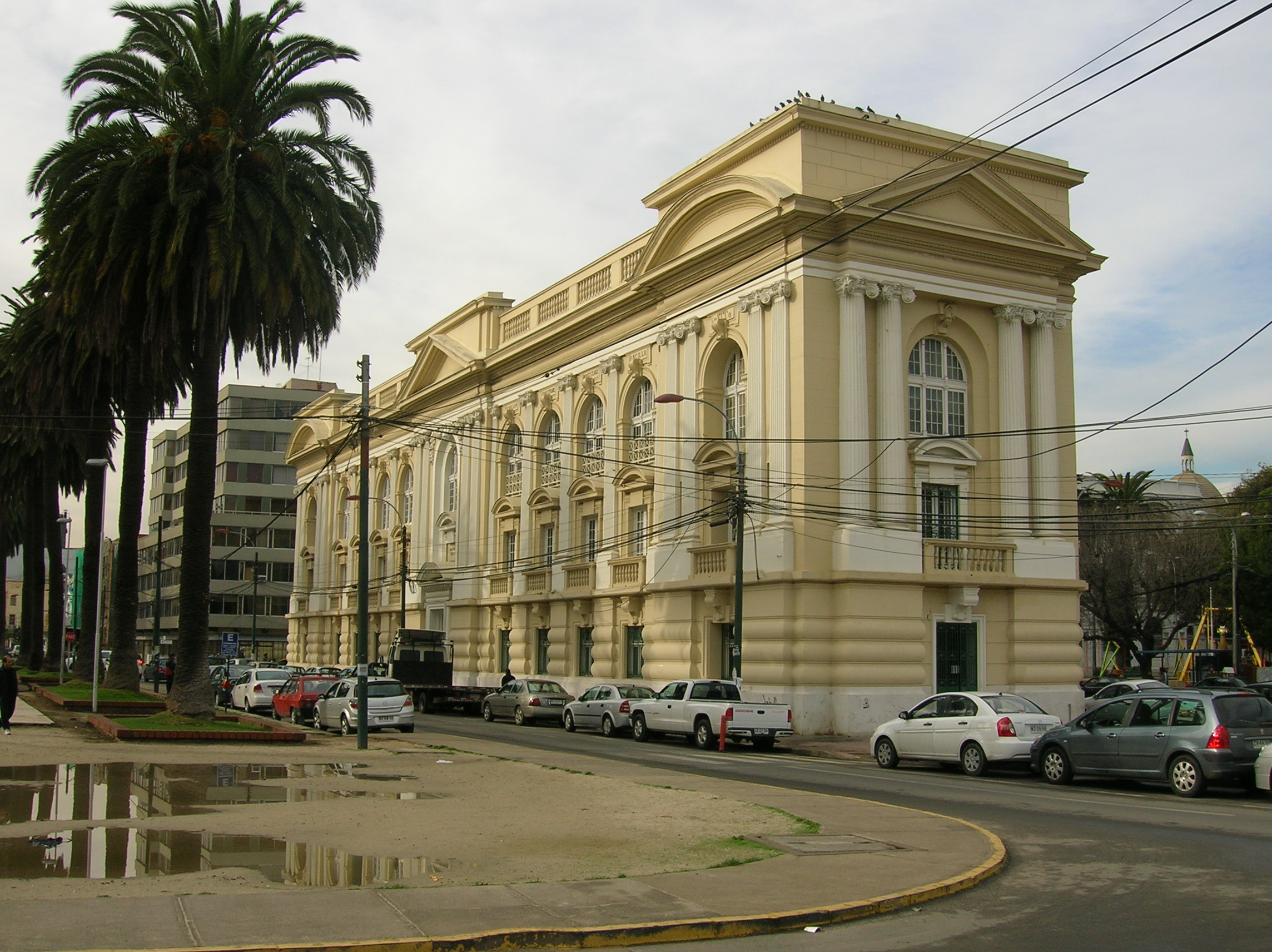
The library, photographed in 2010

Santiago Severín Library (Spanish: Biblioteca Santiago Severín) is a public library located in Valparaíso, Chile. It was the first public library created with the consent of the Chilean government and was established on 27 February 1873. It holds 80,000 volumes. The current building was built between 1912 and 1919, damaged during the 27 February 2010 earthquake and later restored. It was declared National Monument in 1998.

== History ==
In its early years, the library was originally housed within some available rooms of the Courts of Justice before then being moved to another location on what is today Edwards street between 1912 and 1919. During this time, Santiago Severin Espina, a businessman and philanthropist from Valparaíso began donating funds to begin the construction of a more suitable and permanent building to house the library's growing collection. This structure was designed by the architects Arnaldo Barison and Renato Schiavon, and built by the engineer Augusto Geiger.

The library itself was built in Neoclassical-Renaissance architectural style, and featured several prominent aspects of this style including pilasters and columns. The original plans as specified by the architects included that the building be 58 meters long, 12 meters wide, and 15 meters high, and maintain the form of an acute rectangle surrounded by four streets. This was in order to ensure that passersby on the street would be provided with a complete overview of the whole building. After the building was completed in 1919, the collection was officially moved into the current building which was named for its benefactor, Santiago Severín.

In the 1980s the library was reopened after undergoing several important refurbishments to the original construction including a new basement and additions to its various interior rooms and collections. However, after a powerful earthquake on 27 February 2010, the library sustained significant damage which resulted in the structure requiring further reconstruction and restoration efforts leaving the library inoperable until the following year. Donations provided by various institutions such as the Pontifical Catholic University of Valparaíso and the Council of Culture and the Arts, allowed for the rebuilding of the library and the future development of additional infrastructure improvements including accessibility to patrons with disabilities, updated lighting and furniture.

Today, the Santiago Severin Library is one of several regional libraries that make up the National System of Public Libraries of the Directorate of Libraries, Archives, and Museums. In addition, it was declared a Historical Monument of Chile in 1998 by the Ministry of Interior.
