= Aníbal Rodríguez =

Chilean lawyer and politician (1868–1941)

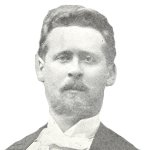

Minister of Finance
- In office 12 January 1923 – 16 March 1923
- President: Arturo Alessandri
- Preceded by: Ricardo Valdés
- Succeeded by: Víctor R. Celis

Minister of War and Navy
- In office 23 September 1919 – 11 November 1919
- President: Juan Luis Sanfuentes
- Preceded by: Enrique Bermúdez de la Paz
- Succeeded by: Germán Riesco E.

President of the Chamber of Deputies of Chile
- In office 28 March 1912 – 1912

Minister of War and Navy
- In office 11 June 1911 – 15 August 1911
- President: Ramón Barros Luco
- Preceded by: Ramón León Luco
- Succeeded by: Alejandro Huneeus
- In office 15 September 1909 – 25 June 1910
- President: Pedro Montt
- Preceded by: Roberto Huneeus
- Succeeded by: Carlos Larraín Claro
- In office 29 August 1908 – 22 January 1909
- President: Pedro Montt
- Preceded by: Belisario Prats Bello
- Succeeded by: Darío Zañartu

Member of the Chamber of Deputies
- In office 15 May 1921 – 15 May 1924
- Constituency: Constitución, Cauquenes and Chanco
- In office 15 May 1909 – 15 May 1921
- Constituency: Concepción, Talcahuano, Lautaro and Coelemu
- In office 15 May 1906 – 15 May 1909
- Constituency: Temuco and Imperial

Personal details
- Born: 1868 Santiago, Chile
- Died: 23 December 1941 Santiago, Chile
- Party: National Party
- Spouses: Rosa Velasco Martínez; Graciela Velasco Martínez
- Children: 1
- Education: University of Chile (LL.B)
- Profession: Lawyer

Aníbal Rodríguez Herrera (1868 – 23 December 1941) was a Chilean lawyer and politician who served as a member of the Chamber of Deputies of Chile from 1906 to 1924.

A member of the National Party, he held several cabinet positions, serving four times as Minister of War and Navy and as Minister of Finance under President Arturo Alessandri.

== Biography ==
Rodríguez was born in Santiago in 1868, the son of Juan Esteban Rodríguez Segura and Ignacia Herrera. While studying at university, he worked at the Ministry of the Interior from 1886 to 1891. He studied law at the University of Chile and qualified as a lawyer on 9 January 1891.

Rodríguez married Rosa Velasco Martínez. Following her death, he married her sister, Graciela Velasco Martínez.

In 1895, Rodríguez was appointed secretary of the Council of State, a position he held until 1899, when he became acting undersecretary of the Interior. During this period, he worked closely with future president Pedro Montt. From 1901 to 1902, he served as intendant of Tarapacá Province and also taught at the Liceo de Iquique. He subsequently returned to the Interior Ministry, remaining there until 1906, when he resigned to seek election to Congress.

== Political career ==
A member of Pedro Montt's National Party, Rodríguez was elected to the Chamber of Deputies for Temuco and Imperial for the 1906–1909 term. On 29 August 1908, Montt appointed him Minister of War and Navy, a position he held until 22 January 1909.

Rodríguez was reelected to the Chamber in 1909, this time representing Concepción, Talcahuano, Lautaro and Coelemu. On 2 June of that year, he was elected first vice president of the Chamber. Montt returned him to the Ministry of War and Navy on 15 September 1909, and he remained in office until 25 June 1910.

Under President Ramón Barros Luco, Rodríguez served a third term as Minister of War and Navy from 11 June to 15 August 1911. On 28 March 1912, he was elected president of the Chamber of Deputies. He was subsequently reelected for Concepción, Talcahuano, Lautaro and Coelemu for the 1912–1915, 1915–1918 and 1918–1921 legislative periods.

President Juan Luis Sanfuentes appointed Rodríguez Minister of War and Navy for a fourth time on 23 September 1919. He remained in the post until 11 November of that year.

In 1921, Rodríguez was elected to his final parliamentary term, representing Constitución, Cauquenes and Chanco until 1924. On 12 January 1923, President Arturo Alessandri appointed him Minister of Finance, a position he held until 16 March.

== Later life ==
Rodríguez withdrew from political life in 1925 and became Santiago's registrar of real property. He remained in Santiago until his death on 23 December 1941.
