= Luis de la Cruz (politician) =

Chilean politician and general

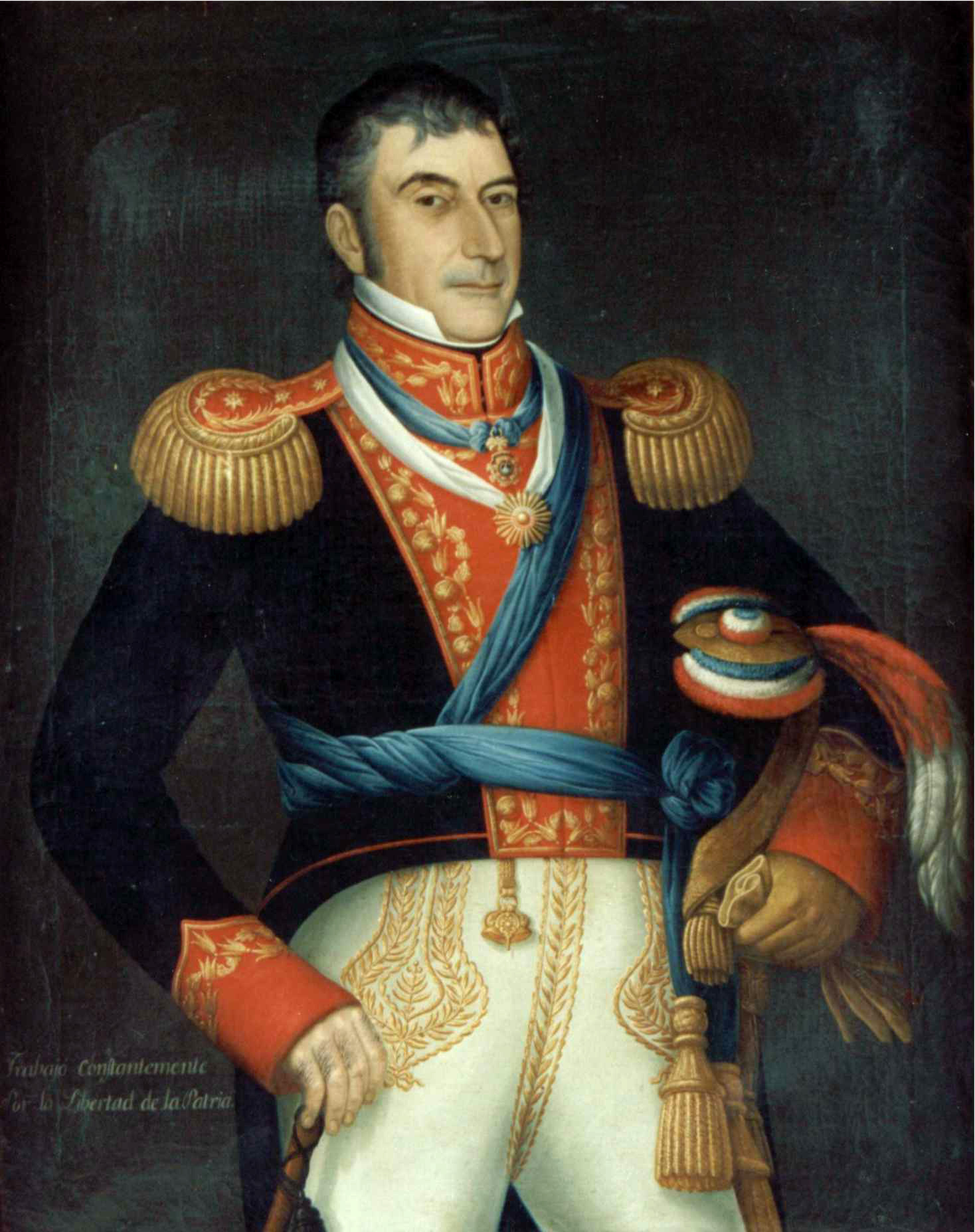
- Portrait by José Gil de Castro
- Born: 25 August 1768; Concepción, Reino de Chile
- Died: 1828 (aged 59–60); Santiago, Chile
- Spouse: Josefa Prieto
- Children: 5, including José María de la Cruz
- Military career
- Allegiance: Chile
- Conflicts: Chilean War of Independence

Luis De la Cruz y Goyeneche (Concepción, Reino de Chile, 25 August 1768 –† Santiago de Chile, 1828) was a Chilean politician and military, son of Pablo De la Cruz and Antonia de Goyeneche y Lope de Lara. His father was born in Tabernas (Spain) in 1714 and was a military who came to Chile in 1740.

He married Josefa Prieto and their son (of five) José María de la Cruz Prieto would also have an important military career.

In 1806 he found and explored the shortest way from Concepción, Chile to Buenos Aires.

He began later his military career during the Chilean War of Independence and participated in several battles and he replaced Bernardo O'Higgins in some occasions.

Ruring the Reconquista, the re-occupation of Chile by the royalist Spanish forces 1814-17, he was held prisoner in the Juan Fernández Islands and freed in 1817 after the Battle of Chacabuco.
