= José Francisco Gana =

Chilean military officer and politician (1791–1864)

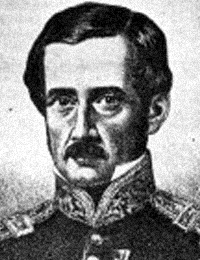
- Born: November 13, 1791; Santiago, Viceroyalty of Peru
- Died: January 20, 1864 (aged 72); Santiago, Chile

José Francisco Gana López (November 13, 1791 – January 20, 1864) was a Chilean military officer and politician, who took part in the Peruvian War of Independence. José Francisco Gana was of Basque descent.

== Early life ==
Gana was born in Santiago, the son of Agustín Gana Darrigrandi and of Dolores López Guerrero. He entered military service in 1806 as a cadet, and in 1808 was promoted to 2nd lieutenant of the king's regiment, in which he served during the apprehension of an English invasion in 1809. In 1812, he quit the Spanish Army when his father was arrested and sent as a prisoner to Callao for participating in the preparations for the Chilean War of Independence. He decided to accompany his father to prison in Peru, and while there he joined a prisoner's revolt, was captured and tortured.

== Military career ==
=== Peru ===
In 1820, Gana entered the service again in Peru, under the orders of General José de San Martín. Gana with his battalion captured the City of Huaras with the whole garrison, and, as a consequence, the provinces of Trujillo, Lambayeque, and Piura pronounced for the insurrection, leading to the whole northern portion of Peru being wrestled from the rule of the viceroy. The viceroy, José de La Serna, was forced to evacuate his capital, Lima, on July 6, and on the 12th San Martin occupied the city. Independence was solemnly proclaimed on July 28.

Meanwhile, Gana took part in the assault of Callao, on August 14, and after the final surrender of September 21, he was promoted to major. Gana participated in General Sucre's expedition to the south, and commanded a column that attacked the Spanish forces at Quilca (August 14, 1823), and, notwithstanding the loss of one third of his troops, routed the enemy and pursued him toward Arequipa.

=== Chile ===
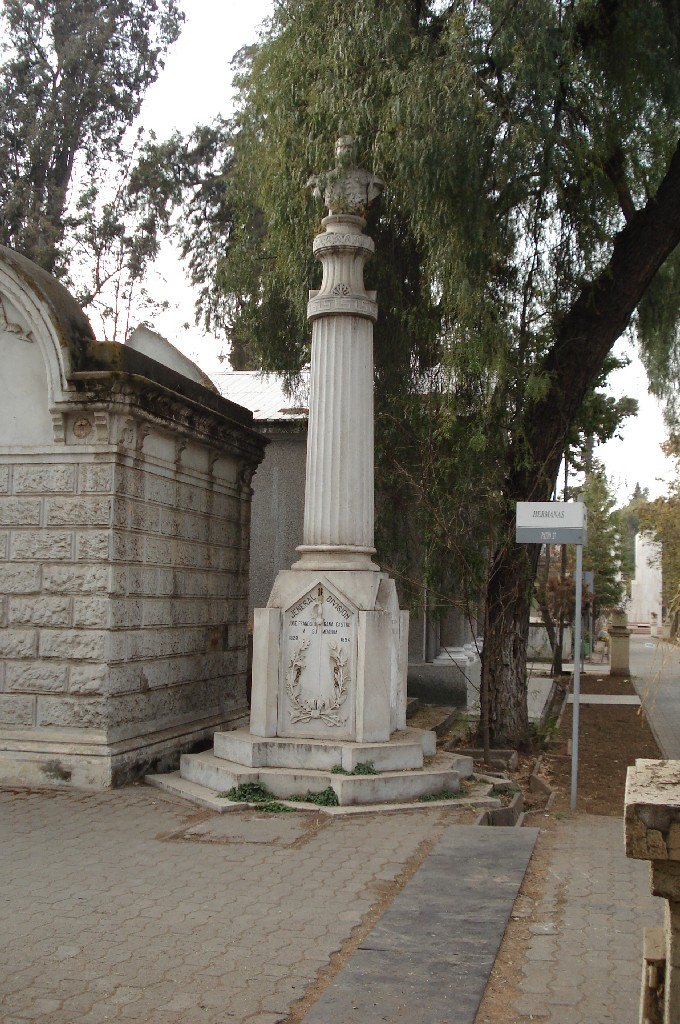
Ganas's tomb in the Cementerio General de Santiago

In October 1823, Gana returned to Chile, and in 1825 was sent with his battalion under Colonel Sanchez to garrison the city of Talca against the attacks of the bands of the Pincheira brothers, whom he surprised and defeated. In December of the same year he was promoted to colonel, and his battalion formed part of General Ramón Freire's expedition to Chiloé, which archipelago was still held by the Spanish under General Antonio Quintanilla. He participated in the decisive Battle of Bellavista (January 14, 1826), and was commissioned by Freire to sign the capitulation of Pudeto on January 19 which surrendered the rest of Chilean territory to the independentist forces. During the Chilean Civil War of 1829, he joined the liberal forces under General Ramón Freire, and, after their defeat at the Battle of Lircay (April 17, 1830) declined to serve under the government of the conservatives, and retired from active service.

== Later life ==
In 1842, Gana was called into service again by the government of General Manuel Bulnes, and appointed director of the military Academy. Twice he was elected Deputy for Talca in congress, and in 1849 Gana was appointed intendant of the province of Atacama. In September 1851, President Manuel Montt named him Minister of War and Navy, and in 1853 Gana was appointed president of the military court of appeals, being promoted in 1854 to brigadier-general. At the same time he became dean of the philological faculty of the Universidad de Chile, a literary honor which no other Chilean general has ever attained. In 1856, he was sent as minister (ambassador) to Ecuador, and on his return in 1857 again took charge of the Ministry of War and Navy. In 1858, he was sent on a special mission to Spain. In 1860, he was elected senator of the republic, and in 1861 appointed counsellor of state. Gana died in his country estate in Nuñoa, in 1864.

== External links and sources ==
- Official biography (in Spanish)

Government offices
Preceded by Pedro Nolasco Vidal	Minister of War and Navy; 1851-1853	Succeeded by Pedro Nolasco Vidal
Preceded by Pedro Nolasco Vidal	Minister of War and Navy; 1856-1857	Succeeded by Manuel García Banqueda
Preceded by José María Berganza	Minister of Finance; 1856	Succeeded by Alejandro Vial
