= Oscar Novoa =

Chilean Army general and fencer (1886–1978)

Óscar Novoa
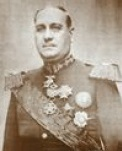
- Novoa c. 1934

Commander-in-chief of the Chilean Army
- In office 27 March 1934 – 20 December 1938
- President: Arturo Alessandri; Pedro Aguirre Cerda
- Preceded by: Marcial Urrutia
- Succeeded by: Carlos Fuentes Rabe

Personal details
- Born: 8 March 1886 Tacna, Chile
- Died: 1978 Santiago, Chile
- Spouse: Blanca Allende Honorato
- Children: 1
- Education: Libertador Bernardo O'Higgins Military Academy
- Profession: Officer

Óscar Novoa Fuentes (8 March 1886 – 1978) was a Chilean Army general and fencer who served as Commander-in-Chief of the Chilean Army from March 1934 to December 1938.

== Early life ==
Novoa was born in Tacna, then part of Chile, on 8 March 1886. He was the son of Chilean Army officer José Manuel Novoa Gormaz and Virginia Fuentes Villarroel.

He attended the Instituto Nacional before entering the Military Academy in 1901. He married Blanca Allende Honorato, with whom he had a son, Óscar.

== Military career ==
Novoa entered the Military Academy as a cadet in 1901 and graduated two years later as an artillery ensign. His first assignment was with the Field Artillery Regiment.

In 1908, holding the rank of lieutenant, he was assigned to the 1st Artillery Regiment Tacna and the 2nd Artillery Regiment Arica. As a captain, he served at the Military Academy from 1915 for four years and was subsequently assigned to the 2nd Artillery Group General Escala.

Novoa was active in equestrian sports, athletics and fencing. In 1924, he was selected to represent the Chilean Army in sabre competition at the 1924 Summer Olympics in Paris, France.

After his promotion to major, Novoa was appointed acting commander of the 2nd Artillery Regiment Arica. He was later promoted to lieutenant colonel and appointed commander of the 3rd Train Battalion.

In 1927, the Chilean Army sent Novoa to the Artillery School in Germany for advanced training in developments in military technology following the First World War.

Upon his return to Chile in 1929, Novoa assumed command of the 3rd Artillery Regiment Chorrillos. After his promotion to colonel, he commanded the 1st Artillery Regiment Tacna. He subsequently served as director of the War Arsenals and commander of the II Army Division.

Novoa was promoted to brigadier general in 1933. On 27 March 1934, President Arturo Alessandri appointed him Commander-in-Chief of the Chilean Army. During this period, he was promoted to major general and subsequently to General of the Army.

His tenure took place during a period of political instability following extensive military involvement in Chilean politics during the 1920s and early 1930s. Novoa maintained a policy of keeping the Army institutionally separate from partisan political activity, in accordance with the Alessandri administration's efforts to restore civilian control over the armed forces.

During his command, Novoa dealt with episodes of internal unrest within the Army and with the political violence surrounding the Seguro Obrero massacre of 5 September 1938, when members of the National Socialist Movement of Chile occupied the central building of the University of Chile and the Seguro Obrero building in Santiago.

Novoa remained commander-in-chief following the inauguration of President Pedro Aguirre Cerda and retired from the Chilean Army on 20 December 1938.

Novoa died in Santiago, Chile, in 1978.
