= Francisco de Paula Donoso Vergara =

Chilean lawyer and politician

Francisco de Paula Donoso Vergara (1807–1888) was a Chilean lawyer and politician.
