= Capture of the Paquete de Maule =

- Part of the Chincha Islands War
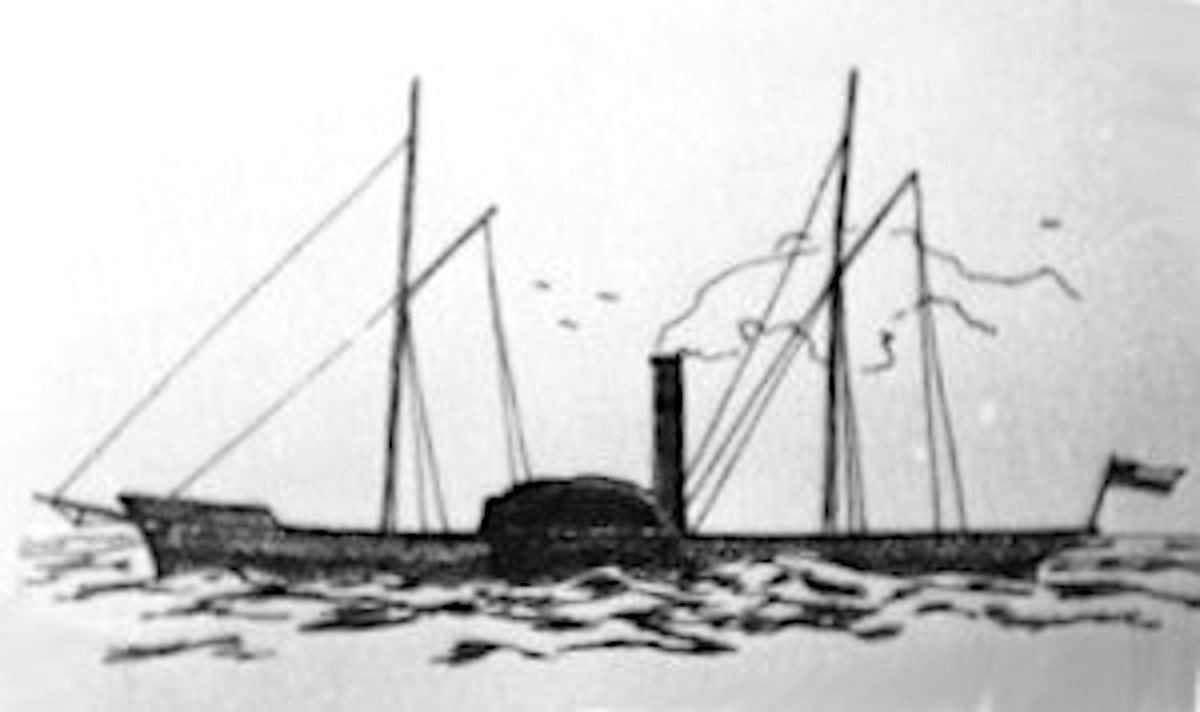
- Chilean steamer Paquete de Maule.
Date	March 6, 1866
Location	Gulf of Arauco, Chile
Result	Spanish victory

Belligerents
Spain	Chile

Commanders and leaders
(Spain) Juan Bautista Topete	(Chile) Luis Alfredo Lynch Solo de Zaldívar (POW)

Strength
1 frigate (39 canons)	1 steamer (unarmed)

Casualties and losses
None	134 captured, 1 steamer captured

On 6 March 1866, during the Chincha Islands War, the Spanish steam frigate Blanca captured the Chilean sidewheel steamer Paquete de Maule in the Gulf of Arauco.

Paquete de Maule was a 400-ton sidewheel steamer built by Lawrence & Foulks in 1861 at Williamsburg, New York for G. K. Stevenson & Co., who planned to operate the vessel between Valparaíso and Maule. During the war, the Paquete de Maule served as an auxiliary ship to the Chilean fleet and it was unarmed. On March 6, 1866, while en route from Lota to Montevideo (and being accompanied by Independencia) with a crew of 7 men, and officer and 126 sailors destined to complete the crews of the Peruvian ironclads Huascar and Independencia, it was captured by the Spanish frigate Blanca, commanded by Juan Bautista Topete.

The Spanish ship didn't detect the Chilean Independencia pailebot and it was able to escape taking refuge in the shallow areas.

The Paquete de Maule sailing under the British colors in a vain attempt to avoid capture. Once the Spanish were on board, her crew alleged to be British citizens, but the unconvinced Spanish officers arrested them. Spanish civilians imprisoned in Lima were offered in exchange for Lynch and his crew, but Méndez Núñez refused.

The Paquete de Maule, added to the Spanish fleet as an auxiliary ship, armed with two cannons, took part in the Battle of Callao. On 10 May 1866 she was burned and scuttled near the San Lorenzo island since the Spanish couldn't take it with them on their retreat towards the Philippines.
