= Carlos Valdovinos =

Chilean politician

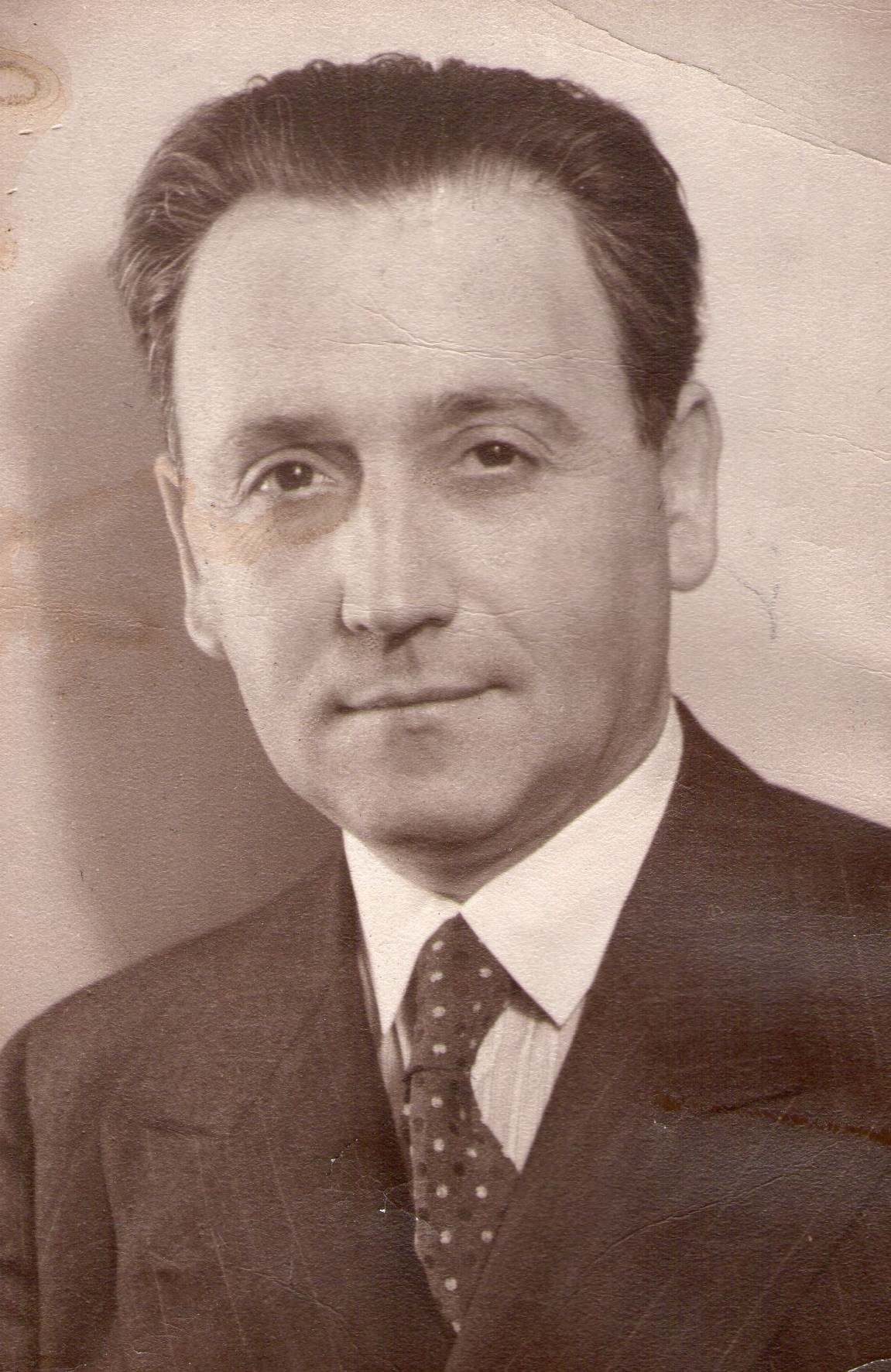

Mayor of San Miguel
- In office 25 May 1950 – 15 May 1960
- Preceded by: René Aravena
- Succeeded by: Julio Palestro

Minister of Defense
- In office 10 July 1941 – 2 April 1942
- President: Pedro Aguirre Cerda; Jerónimo Méndez (caretaker)
- Preceded by: Juvenal Hernández
- Succeeded by: Alfredo Duhalde

Minister of the Interior
- In office 16 September 1941 – 6 October 1941
- President: Pedro Aguirre Cerda
- Preceded by: Arturo Olavarría Bravo
- Succeeded by: Leonardo Guzmán Cortés

Personal details
- Born: 19 December 1899 Colchagua, Chile
- Died: 14 March 1966 (aged 76) Santiago, Chile
- Party: Radical Party
- Education: University of Chile (LL.B)
- Occupation: Politician
- Profession: Lawyer

Carlos Valdovinos Valdovinos (19 December 1899−14 March 1966) was a Chilean politician and lawyer who served as bi-minister during Pedro Aguirre Cerda's government.

In his country, he is commonly known to have an avenue and a metro station with his name. In the other hand, Valdovinos was a transversal politician in his time, which is supported by the tributes he received from the then-Marxist deputy Mario Palestro, from the Socialist Party, as well as from politicians linked to the Liberal Party and the Conservative Party.

== See also ==
- Carlos Valdovinos metro station
