= Germán Ignacio Riesco =

Chilean politician

Minister of Foreign Affairs
- In office 7 July 1948 – 10 February 1950
- President: Gabriel González Videla
- Preceded by: Germán Vergara
- Succeeded by: Germán Vergara

Member of the Chamber of Deputies
- In office 15 May 1924 – 11 September 1924
- Succeeded by: Congress dissolved
- Constituency: Rancagua

Minister of War and Navy
- In office 8 November 1919 – 26 March 1920
- President: Juan Luis Sanfuentes
- Preceded by: Aníbal Rodríguez
- Succeeded by: Régulo Valenzuela

Personal details
- Born: 30 June 1888, Chile
- Died: 11 November 1958 (aged 70), Chile
- Party: Liberal Party
- Spouse: Rosa Barceló Pinto
- Children: None

Germán Ignacio Riesco Errázuriz (1888 – November 11, 1958) was a Chilean political figure, who served several times as minister between 1919 and 1950. He was of Basque descent and a member of the influential Errázuriz family.

He was born in Santiago in 1888, the son of President Germán Riesco and of First Lady María Errázuriz Echaurren. He graduated as a lawyer from the Universidad de Chile on April 21, 1910. He was Minister of War and Navy of President Juan Luis Sanfuentes between 1919 and 1920; and Minister of Foreign Affairs between 1948 and 1950, under President Gabriel González Videla. He married Rosa Barceló Pinto but they had no children.
