= José María Benavente =

Chilean military officer and politician (1785–1833)

José María Benavente Bustamante (10 September 1785 – 14 October 1833) was a Chilean military officer and politician who participated in the Chilean War of Independence and later served as governor of Valparaíso and intendant of Coquimbo.

He attained the rank of brigadier general in 1827 and was appointed Minister of War and Navy in February 1830, although he never assumed office.
