= Marcos Maturana =

Chilean military and political figure (1802–1871)

Marcos Maturana del Campo
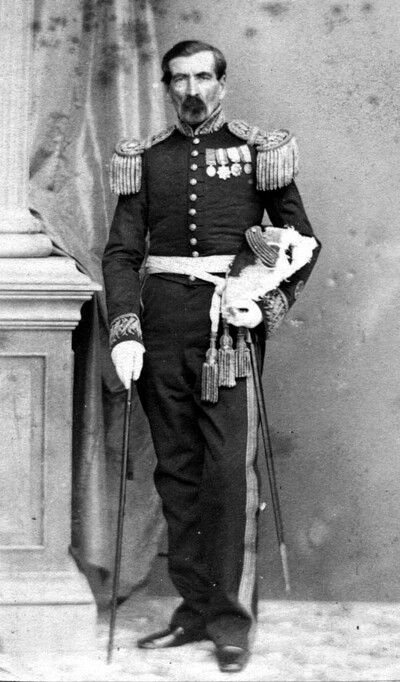
- Marcos Maturana del Campo

Personal details
- Born: 1802 San Fernando, Chile
- Died: 1871 (aged 68–69) Santiago, Chile

Military service
- Allegiance: Chile
- Branch/service: Chilean Army
- Years of service: 1813–1870
- Rank: Division General
- Battles/wars: Chilean War of Independence; Chiloé Campaign; Chilean Civil War of 1829; War of the Confederation; Occupation of Araucanía

Marcos Maturana del Campo (1802-1871) was a Chilean military and political figure who served in the Chilean War of Independence and the War of the Confederation.

== Biography ==
Maturana was born in San Fernando, the son of Manuel Jesús Maturana Guzmán and of Petronila del Campo. In 1818 at the age of 16, he became a cadet of the Húsares de la Muerte under Manuel Rodríguez and participated in the Battle of Maipú during the Chilean War of Independence. By 1820 he already was a second Lieutenant, and a member of the expedition to Peru where he was then captured, where he fought in the siege of Callao. Maturana was promoted to captain in 1824, and participated in the Chiloé campaigns of 1825 and 1826.

During the Chilean Civil War of 1829, he participated in the battles of Ochagavía and Lircay. In 1831 Maturana was promoted to Major and in 1834 to Lieutenant colonel. During the War of the Confederation he fought at the battles of Portada de Guías (1838) and Yungay (1839), and in the capture of Lima. In 1847 he was promoted to Colonel and named Aide-de-camp to President Manuel Bulnes.

On April 20, 1851, during the Urriola mutiny, he successfully defended his barracks against the attack of a full regiment and decisively contributed to the restoration of the public order. Maturana participated in the Occupation of the Araucanía during the later stages of the Arauco War and was promoted to Brigade General in 1854 and Division General in 1865. In 1855 he was elected Deputy for Santiago until 1858. President José Joaquín Pérez named him Minister of War and Navy, a position he held between July 9, 1862, and January 4, 1865. In 1864 he was again elected a deputy, and in 1866, he became the Senior General Officer (equivalent to Army Commander-in-Chief) and a Councilor of State. In 1867 he was elected Senator and reelected in 1870, a position he retained until his death.

He retired from the Chilean Army in 1870, after 57 years, 4 months, and 9 days of service and died in Santiago the following year, at the age of 69.

Political offices
Preceded by Manuel García	Minister of War and Navy; 1862-1865	Succeeded by José Manuel Pinto
Military offices
Preceded by Manuel Bulnes	Senior General Officer; 1866-1870	Succeeded by Juan Manuel Jarpa

== See also ==
- Juan Albano Pereira Márquez
- Marcos Segundo Maturana Molina
- Pedro Nolasco Vergara Albano
