= José Miguel Barriga Castro =

Chilean lawyer and politician

Member of Parliament, the Republic of Chile
- In office 1855–1858
- Preceded by: Máximo Mujica Echaurren
- Succeeded by: Francisco Vargas Fontecilla
- Constituency: San Felipe, Putaendo and Los Andes

Member of Parliament, the Republic of Chile
- In office 1858–1861
- Preceded by: José Alejo Valenzuela Díaz
- Succeeded by: Manuel José Yrarrázaval Larraín
- Constituency: Petorca and La Ligua

Member of Parliament, the Republic of Chile
- In office 1861–1864
- Preceded by: Rafael Gatica Soiza
- Succeeded by: Juan Esteban Rodríguez Segura
- Constituency: Linares, Parral and Loncomilla Department

Personal details
- Born: June 14, 1816 Los Andes, Captaincy General of Chile, Spanish Empire
- Died: September 3, 1886 (aged 70) Santiago, Chile
- Party: Chile Liberal Party
- Spouse: Trinidad Espinoza Plaza de los Reyes
- Occupation: Lawyer, politician, surveyor

José Miguel Barriga Castro (Los Andes, Chile, June 14, 1816 – September 3, 1886) was a Chilean lawyer, politician and surveyor. He was the son of Don Juan Agustín Barriga and Margarita Castro. On May 24, 1844, he married Trinidad Espinoza Plaza de los Reyes in Cauquenes.

== Education ==
He began his studies in his hometown and later moved to Santiago, where he studied at the National Institute. He was admitted to the bar on May 3, 1837. He then began his surveying studies, which concluded in 1839.

== Professional career ==
José Miguel Barriga Castro served first as a teacher at the National Institute, a position he held until 1842, when he became judge of Cauquenes. His good work made him move up quickly. In 1847 he was appointed Governor of Maule, developing a comprehensive work of social progress.

Castro was the founding Minister of the Concepción Court (1849) and Minister of the Santiago Court of Appeals (1852). He joined the Civil Code Revision Commission to draft Andres Bello in 1855. That same year he was named Minister of the Supreme Court and in 1857 president of the national Supreme Court of Justice.

== Political career ==
José Miguel Barriga Castro was a member of the Liberal Party. He was elected Member of Parliament for San Felipe (1855-1858), for Petorca (1858-1861) and for Linares (1861-1864). During this time he integrated the Standing Committee on Constitution, Law and Justice, and also the Standing Committee on Finance and Industry. He was Vice President of the House of Representatives (1858). He was again selected President of the Supreme Court of Justice (1877-1883).

Castro retired to live in his private residence until his death on September 3, 1886.
