= Manuel García Banqueda =

Chilean military and political figure (1803–1872)

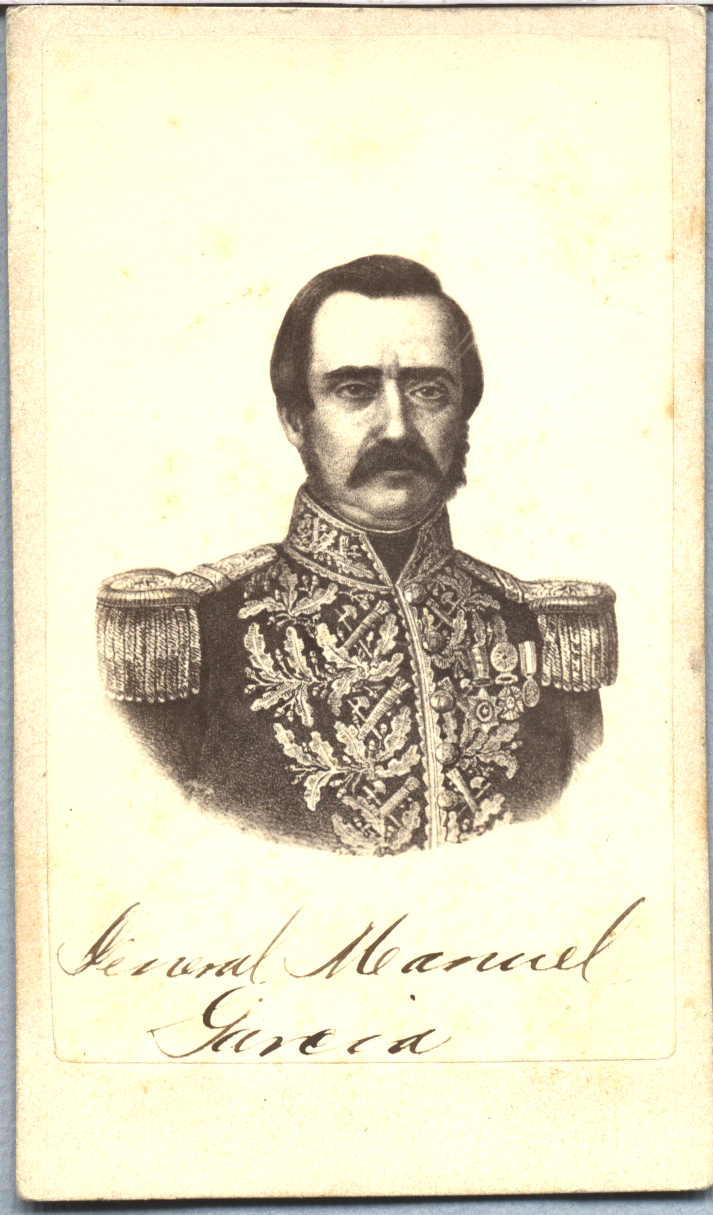
A portrait of Manuel Garcia Banqueda

General Manuel García Banqueda (1803 – May 4, 1872) was a Chilean military and political figure.

García Banqueda was born in Santiago, the son of Antonio García, Lieutenant in the "Dragones de la Reina" (Queen's Dragoons) and of Juana Banqueda. In 1817 (at the age of 12), he became a cadet in the recently formed Military Academy, created by Bernardo O'Higgins that year. He fought in the Battle of Maipú, during the Chilean War of Independence. He also participated in the Valdivia and Chiloé campaigns of 1825 and 1826. He married Dolores Carmona Fonseca, and they had several children.

García Banqueda was promoted to captain in 1824, and participated in the Occupation of the Araucanía during the later stages of the Arauco War, against the Araucanian bands of Mariluán. He was also present at the capture of the Roquecura castle and the battle of Bellavista. In 1828, he campaigned against the Pincheira brothers. During the War of the Confederation he fought at the battles of Portada de Guías (1838), Chiquián, Buin, Yungay (1839), and in the capture of Lima. He was promoted to colonel on the field of Yungay as a reward for his bravery.

In 1834 he was elected Deputy for "Rancagua" until 1837. He was a firm supporter of minister Diego Portales. In 1840 he was again elected a deputy and again between 1852 and 1861, this times for "Santiago", "Concepcion" and "San Carlos". He was promoted to Brigade General in 1855, and Division General in 1862. He fought at Loncomilla, and captured Talca during the 1858 rebellion.

President Manuel Montt named him Minister of War and Navy, a position he held between September 29, 1857 and July 9, 1862, having been reconfirmed in his position by President José Joaquín Pérez. He died in Santiago.

== Sources ==
- Figueroa, Pedro Pablo (1897). Diccionario Biográfico de Chile (PDF) (in Spanish). Vol. II. Santiago, Chile: Imprenta i Encuadernación Barcelona. pp. 32–33.

Government offices
Preceded by José Francisco Gana	Minister of War and Navy; 1857-1862	Succeeded by Marcos Maturana
