= Aldunate =

Aldunate is a surname. Notable people with the surname include:

== First surname ==
- Arturo Aldunate Phillips (1902–1985), Chilean poet, father of Aldunate Bezanilla
- Carlos Aldunate Errázuriz (1880–1959), Chilean lawyer and politician, father of the Aldunate Lyon siblings
- Carlos Aldunate Solar (1856–1931), Chilean politician, father of the Aldunate Errázuriz siblings
- Carlos Aldunate Lyon (1916–2018), Chilean Catholic Jesuit priest
- Carmen Aldunate Salas (1940–2026), Chilean painter and illustrator
- Elena Aldunate Bezanilla (1925–2005), Chilean journalist and writer
- Emilio Aldunate Bascuñán (1871–1946), Chilean physician, father of the Aldunate Phillips siblings
- Fernando Aldunate Errázuriz (1895–1990), Chilean politician and diplomat
- José Aldunate Lyon (1917–2019), Chilean Jesuit priest and human rights activist
- José Santiago Aldunate y Toro (1796–1864), Chilean Army officer and politician, lost the 1856 presidential election, father of Aldunate y Avaria
- Luis Aldunate Carrera (1842–1908), Chilean lawyer and politician, father of Aldunate Echeverría
- Luis Pastor Aldunate Echeverría (1872–1948), Chilean politician and diplomat
- Manuel Aldunate y Avaria (1815–1904), Chilean soldier and engineer (Mercado Central de Santiago), father of the Aldunate Bascuñán siblings
- Manuel Aldunate Solar (1860–1891), Chilean Army officer and politician
- Paul Aldunate Phillips (1909–?), Chilean lawyer and politician
- Raúl Aldunate Phillips (1906–1979), Chilean writer, politician, and soldier
- Roberto Aldunate León (1898–1980), Chilean politician and diplomat
- Santiago Aldunate Bascuñán (1857–1918), Chilean diplomat and politician

== Compound surname ==
- José Antonio Martínez de Aldunate (1731–1811), Chilean bishop and politician

== Second surname ==
- Fernando Errázuriz Aldunate (1777–1841), Chilean politician
- Gregorio Amunátegui Aldunate (1830–1899), Chilean lawyer and politician
- José Antonio Pérez-Cotapos Aldunate (fl. 1820s), Chilean military officer and politician
- Juan Carlos Silva Aldunate (born 1976), Chilean lawyer and politician
- Luz Bulnes Aldunate (1927–2019), Chilean jurist
- Miguel Luis Amunátegui Aldunate (1828–1888), Chilean historian and politician
- Raquel Barros Aldunate (1919–2014), Chilean folklorist
- Sergio Valech Aldunate (1927–2010), Chilean prelate of the Roman Catholic Church (Valech Report)
- Wilson Ferreira Aldunate (1919–1988), Uruguayan politician

== See also ==
- Urraúl Bajo, Spanish municipality where the village of Aldunate is located
