= Juan Silva =

Juan Silva may refer to:

- Juan Silva Pinto (1898–1991), Chilean politician
- Juan Silva (athlete) (1930–2007), Chilean long-distance runner
- Juan Silva (footballer, born 1948), Uruguayan footballer for Peñarol
- Juan Manuel Silva (born 1972), Argentine racing driver
- Juan Carlos Silva Aldunate (born 1976), Chilean lawyer and politician
- Juan Silva (footballer, born 1981), Uruguayan football midfielder
- Juan Carlos Silva (footballer) (born 1988), Mexican football midfielder
- Juan Silva (footballer, born January 1989), Uruguayan footballer for Juventud de Las Piedras
- Juan Silva (footballer, born March 1989), Chilean footballer for Deportes La Serena
- Juan Silva (footballer, born 1990), Chilean footballer for Deportes Melipilla
- Juan Silva (footballer, born 1997), Argentine footballer for Club de Gimnasia y Esgrima La Plata

== See also ==
- Juan de Silva (died 1616), Spanish military commander and governor of the Philippines
