= Elisa Serrana =

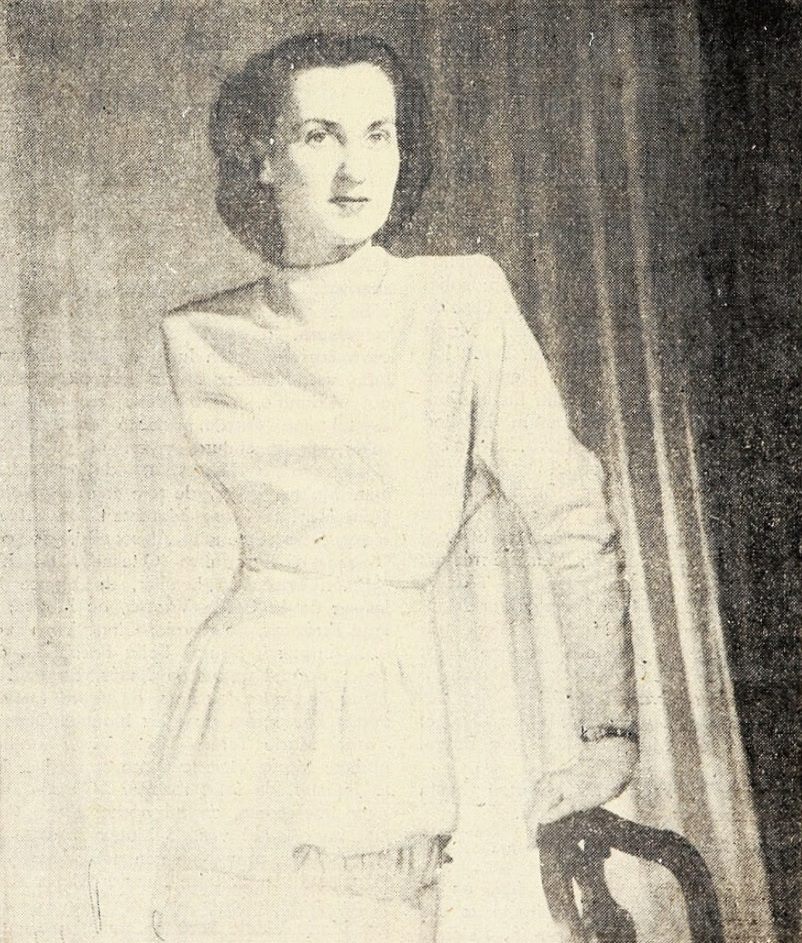
- 1946
- Born: Elisa Pérez Walker; 1930; Santiago, Chile
- Died: 4 September 2012 (aged 82); Santiago, Chile
- Occupations: Writer, teacher
- Years active: 1955–1986
- Notable work: Tres caras y un sello (1961)
- Spouse: Horacio Serrano
- Children: Elena, Paula, Margarita, Marcela, Sol

Elisa Pérez Walker (1930 – 4 September 2012), better known by the pseudonym Elisa Serrana, was a Chilean feminist, teacher, and novelist. She was a member of her country's Generation of '50, which also included Marta Jara, Elena Aldunate, Mercedes Valdivieso, and Matilde Ladrón de Guevara.

== Biography ==
Elisa Pérez Walker was born into a family of landowners. Her mother was Blanca Walker Larraín and her father was Santiago Pérez Peña, a civil engineer, farmer, deputy for Caupolicán Department (1924; 1926–1930), Minister of Justice (1932), mayor of Magallanes (1937), and president of the Chilean Golf Federation (1949–1951).

About them she would say:

My father wrote verses, painted oil paintings, imagined big companies, bought mines in Bolivia and sold farms in Chile, defended freedom from the National Congress and was persecuted for it. Railway engineer, liberal politician, visionary in ideas, hapless in business. He was cheerful, depressed, creative, and unstable. He loved his family and left it in the street, lived like a man and died in poverty, leaving me with only a very tender, distant, and unreal memory. My mother was, by education, vocation, and profession, Christian. Religion was the beginning and the end of her efforts. She taught us to pray, read, write, and recite. Sober and puritanical, she adapted to the unusual swings of life that my father imposed on her. She really liked poverty, but adapted to vagrancy with pain. Of sad and austere character...

Elisa, who had eight brothers, was educated at the Sacred Hearts College of Providencia, about which she later said, "Family affection failed to sweeten the bitter memory I have of my childhood: the school, the classmates, and the teachers were tremendously odious." She then studied pedagogy in religion at the Pontifical Catholic University of Chile.

At age 19 she married Horacio Serrano, an essayist 20 years her elder, the former Minister of Agriculture (1940), a future member of the Academia Chilena de la Lengua (1970), and columnist for El Mercurio. The couple had five daughters, among them writer Marcela Serrano, of whom it was observed "you can perceive a certain continuity, a literary-filial relationship that seems to go hand in hand with the generational change that took place between Elisa Serrana and her daughter." Their daughter Sol Serrano is a historian.

In 1972 the Popular Unity government expropriated the Los Remolinos family farm in Ñuble Region, which according to her daughter Margarita "was an emotional tragedy" for the family. Despite this, they were not supporters of the military coup led by General Augusto Pinochet against Salvador Allende the following year.

Elisa Serrana worked at the Zig-Zag publishing house from 1962 to 1976, becoming director of the Disney children's magazine department. She was a teacher at Saint George's College in Santiago.

After suffering a stroke in 1987, she retired to Mallarauco, 15 kilometers from Melipilla, where she spent the last 30 years of her life. Described by her daughters Paula and Margarita as "extremely Catholic," the writer "never stopped believing or praying."

== Literary career ==
Elisa Serrana's first creative efforts were, she considered, "horrible verses, which converged in a shoebox as a wonderful secret." She later wrote her first novel, which she later described as "320 pages of fiction with some real touches and features of people" about her family, which was never released "because the book is bad." She published a poetry collection, Homenaje al miedo, in 1950.

Her first stories were brought to writer Eugenio González Rojas, who commented on and corrected them. She began to publish articles and short stories in various newspapers and magazines in 1955. She made a name for herself as a writer in 1960, when her first novel Las tres caras de un sello was published to critical success.

In the literary field, much of her work concerned the role of bourgeois women in Chile. Four novels followed: Chilena, casada, sin profesión, an exhibit of the effects of feminism in Chilean society of the 1920s; Una; En blanco y negro; and A cuál de ellas quiere usted: "mandandirumdirunda", which received a distinction in the 1985 María Luisa Bombal Contest.

In the opinion of Michelle Prain Brice, Serrana portrayed

...with acuteness the passivity of the Chilean woman. She was a sales success and, judging from the results, resounded deeply with her readers, contributing, of course, to changing entrenched habits.

The stroke she suffered in 1987 forced her to abandon literary production, without realizing her dream of writing what she considered her masterpiece: "the story of three generations, her mother's, hers, and their daughters. The three with their dramas and virtues and with their difficulties of adaptation."

== Novels ==
- Las tres caras de un sello, Editorial Zig-Zag, Santiago, 1960, ISBN 9789561317734 (reissued: 1961, 1964)
- Chilena, casada, sin profesión, Zig-Zag, Santiago, 1963 (reissued: 1964, 1965, 1967, 1974; Andrés Bello 2002, 2003)
- Una, Zig-Zag, Santiago, 1964, ISBN 9788434700604 (reissued: 1965, 1973)
- En blanco y negro Zig-Zag, Santiago, 1968 (reissued: Plaza & Janés, 2005, ISBN 9789568352073)
- A cuál de ellas quiere usted: "mandandirumdirunda", Editorial Andrés Bello, Santiago, 1985
- Obras selectas, Andrés Bello, Santiago, 2002, ISBN 9789561317734
