= 1928 in Chile =

- Decades: 1900s; 1910s; 1920s; 1930s; 1940s
- See also: Other events of 1928; Timeline of Chilean history

The following lists events that happened during 1928 in Chile.

== Incumbents ==
- President of Chile: Carlos Ibáñez del Campo

== Events ==
=== December ===
- 1 December – 1928 Talca earthquake

== Births ==
- 2 February – Raimundo Infante (d. 1986)
- 28 April – Manuel Muñoz (footballer)
- 15 May – Ian Campbell (rugby player)
- 2 October – Carlos Rojas
- 19 December – Andrés Prieto
- 23 December – Hernán García de Gonzalo, retired Chilean diplomat and academic

== Deaths ==
- 14 April – Abdón Cifuentes (b. 1835)
