= Matilde Ladrón de Guevara =

Chilean poet, feminist, and writer

- Born: 18 August 1910; Santiago, Chile
- Died: 22 August 2009 (aged 99); Santiago, Chile
- Occupations: Poet, writer
- Spouse: Marcial Arredondo Lillo (1932–1979)
- Children: Marcial, Sybila Arredondo

Matilde Ladrón de Guevara (18 August 1910 – 22 August 2009) was a Chilean poet, feminist, and writer. She was a member of her country's Generation of '50, which also included Marta Jara, Elisa Serrana, Elena Aldunate, and Mercedes Valdivieso.

== Biography ==
Matilde Ladrón de Guevara was born in Santiago on 18 August 1910. She studied at the Liceo Antonia Salas Errázuriz de Santiago. Her university studies took place at the Pontifical Catholic University of Chile, the University of Chile, and the Sorbonne in France. In 1925 she participated in a beauty contest, where she took first place, being crowned "Miss Chile". She married Marcial Arredondo Lillo in 1932. However, she also had an affair with the German pianist Walter Gieseking, a relationship she addressed in her 1953 novel Mi patria fue su música.

After living for a few years in Rapallo, Italy, Ladrón de Guevara returned to Chile, where she began to participate in politics, becoming one of the founders of the Chilean Women's Party in 1946. In the 1940s and 50s she was a correspondent for several magazines and newspapers, both Chilean and international, among them Ecran (for whom she interviewed Ingrid Bergman in Hollywood), Zig-Zag, La Tercera de la Hora, La Nación of Buenos Aires, El Mercurio, and Marcha of Montevideo. In 1948 she began her literary career with the poetry collection Amarras de luz.

She lived in Cuba for a short time in the 1960s, where she became friends with Fidel Castro and Che Guevara, inspiring her to write Ché (1969) and Cubanía y Ché (1998). Although sympathetic to their point of view, she was able to learn of the prisons of the regime and the atmosphere of repression, which she expressed in Adiós al cañaveral (1962). She later supported the Popular Unity government in Chile, led by President Salvador Allende, which ended with a 1973 coup. After publishing her novel La ciénaga (1975), she had to seek exile in Argentina, where she wrote Destierro (1983) and Y va a caer (1985). She returned to Chile in 1979, the year in which her husband Marcial died.

In 1990 her daughter Sybila was sentenced to 14 years in prison in Lima, Peru, for being linked to the Shining Path group. After her sentence was increased in 1995, she was released in 2002. To her daughter, Ladrón de Guevara dedicated Sybila en Canto Grande (1988) and Por ella, Sybila viuda de José María Arguedas (1995).

Matilde Ladrón de Guevara died at age 99 at Santiago's Military Hospital on 22 August 2009 from tumors which had been detected shortly before her death.

== Honors ==
Ladrón de Guevara was a candidate for the National Prize for Literature in 2006.

In 2009 she received the Career Award of the Society of Latin American and European Writers.

== Works ==
=== Poetry ===
- Amarras de luz (1948)
- Pórtio de Iberia (1950)
- Desnuda (1960)
- Ché (1969)
- Testamento (1973)
- Antología poética desnuda (1989)
- Cubanía y Ché (1998)
- Antología poética (In)completa de Matilde Ladrón de Guevara (2005)
- 100 años no es nada (2010, posthumous)

=== Novels ===
- Mi patria fue su música (1953)
- Celda 13 (with Juan Sánchez Guerrero, 1960)
- Madre soltera (1966)
- Muchachos de siempre (1969)
- En Isla de Pascua los moai están de pie (1971)
- La ciénaga (1975)

=== Short stories ===
- La última esclava (1979)
- Te amo Rapa Nui y diez cuentos (1981)

=== Essays and chronicles ===
- Gabriela Mistral, rebelde magnífica (1957)
- Adiós al Cañaveral (1962)

=== Journals and testimonials ===
- Destierro (1983)
- Y va a caer (1985)
- Sybila en Canto Grande (1988)
- Pacto sublime (with Gabriel Egaña, 1995)
- Por ella, Sybila viuda de José María Arguedas (1995)
- Leona de invierno (Desmemorias) (1998)
