= 1916 in Chile =

- Decades: 1890s; 1900s; 1910s; 1920s; 1930s
- See also: Other events of 1916; Timeline of Chilean history

The following lists events that happened during 1916 in Chile.

== Incumbents ==
- President of Chile: Juan Luis Sanfuentes

== Events ==
=== July ===
- 14 July – The Club Deportivo Ferroviarios is founded.

== Births ==
- 16 May – Carlos Aldunate Lyon, Jesuit priest (d. 2018)
- 16 July – Patricio Carvajal, admiral and politician (d. 1994)
- 22 September – Enrique Accorsi, Olympic fencer (d. 1990)
- 23 September – Carlos Ruiz Fuller, geologist and mining engineer (d. 1997)
- 13 October – Ismael Huerta, admiral and politician (d. 1997)

== Deaths ==
- 8 December – Germán Riesco (b. 1854)
