= 1923 in Chile =

- Decades: 1900s; 1910s; 1920s; 1930s; 1940s
- See also: Other events of 1923; Timeline of Chilean history

The following lists events that happened during 1923 in Chile.

== Incumbents ==
- President of Chile: Arturo Alessandri

== Events ==
=== February ===
- 1 February – The Lautaro de Buin football club is established.

== Births ==
- 11 February – Clodomiro Almeyda (d. 1997)
- 8 March – Atilio Cremaschi (d. 2007)
- 11 April – Jorge Hübner (d. 2006)
- 23 June – Julio Martínez (journalist) (d. 2008)
- 13 August – Osvaldo Sáez (d. 1959)
- 2 October – Eugenio Cruz Vargas (d. 2014)
- 31 October – Arturo Alessandri Besa (d. 2022)
- 25 December – Luis Álamos (d. 1983)

== Deaths ==
- 23 June – Estanislao del Canto (b. 1840)
