= Juan Carlos Silva =

Juan Carlos Silva may refer to:

- Juan Carlos Silva (politician) (born 1976), Chilean lawyer and politician
- Juan Carlos Silva (footballer) (born 1988), Mexican footballer
