= Galarce =

Galarce is a surname. Notable people with the surname include:

- Eduardo Parraguez Galarce (1935–2026), Chilean politician
- Felipe Reynero Galarce (born 1989), Chilean footballer
- Gustavo Parraguez Galarce (born 1943), Chilean politician
