= 1924 in Chile =

- Decades: 1900s; 1910s; 1920s; 1930s; 1940s
- See also: Other events of 1924; Timeline of Chilean history

The following lists events that happened during 1924 in Chile.

== Incumbents ==
- President of Chile: Arturo Alessandri (until September 11), Luis Altamirano

== Events ==
=== September ===
- 3 September – The Saber noise occurs.
- 11 September – The Government Junta of Chile (1924) is created after a military coup.

=== Undated ===
- A record drought in Central Chile produce what remains the driest year in Santiago (66.1 millimetres or 2.60 inches) and Valparaíso (58 millimetres or 2.28 inches), as well as the driest until 1996 in Concepción with 671.9 millimetres or 26.45 inches.

== Births ==
- 1 January – Klaus Junge (d. 1945)
- 1 March – Mercedes Valdivieso (d. 1993)
- 7 April – Daniel Emilfork (d. 2006)
- 24 April – Vicente Sota, politician (d. 2017)
- 20 September – Exequiel Ramírez (d. 2000)

== Deaths ==
- 19 December – Luis Emilio Recabarren (b. 1876)
