= 1931 in Chile =

- Decades: 1910s; 1920s; 1930s; 1940s; 1950s
- See also: Other events of 1931; Timeline of Chilean history

The following lists events that happened during 1931 in Chile.

== Incumbents ==
- President of Chile: Carlos Ibáñez del Campo (until 26 July), Pedro Opaso (27 July), Juan Esteban Montero (until 20 August), Manuel Trucco (until 15 November), Juan Esteban Montero

== Events ==
=== August ===
- 31 August – Chilean naval mutiny of 1931

=== October ===
- 4 October – Chilean presidential election, 1931

=== December ===
- 25 December – Norte Grande insurrection

== Births ==
- 13 February – Gonzalo Figueroa Garcia Huidobro (d. 2008)
- 21 July – Leon Schidlowsky (d. 2022)
- 7 August – Fernando Rosas Pfingsthorn (d. 2007)
- 14 August – Jaime Ramírez (d. 2003)
- 12 October – Ricardo Yrarrázaval Larraín
- November – Guillermo Jullian de la Fuente (d. 2008)

== Deaths ==
- 15 May – Emiliano Figueroa (b. 1866)
