= 1935 in Chile =

- Decades: 1910s; 1920s; 1930s; 1940s; 1950s
- See also: Other events of 1935; Timeline of Chilean history

The following lists events that happened during 1935 in Chile.

== Incumbents ==
- President of Chile: Arturo Alessandri

== Events ==
=== June ===
- 25 June – The Colegio Niño Jesús de Praga is founded.

== Births ==
- date unknown – Cristián Huneeus (d. 1985)
- 22 June – Sergio Valdés (footballer) (d. 2019)
- 31 December – Mario Moreno (footballer) (d. 2005)

== Deaths ==
- date unknown – Tomás Guevara (b. 1865)
- 21 February – Luis Pardo (b. 1882)
- October – Serafín López
