= 1929 in Chile =

- Decades: 1900s; 1910s; 1920s; 1930s; 1940s
- See also: Other events of 1929; Timeline of Chilean history

The following lists events that happened during 1929 in Chile.

== Incumbents ==
- President of Chile: Carlos Ibáñez del Campo

== Events ==
=== June ===
- 3 June – Treaty of Lima (1929)

== Births ==
- 17 Feb – Alejandro Jodorowsky, Chilean and French avant-garde filmmaker.
- 4 May – Manuel Contreras, army officer and the former head of the Dirección de Inteligencia Nacional (died 2015)
- 22 June – José Florencio Guzmán, lawyer and politician (died 2017)
- 26 June – Jorge Jottar, sports shooter (died 2014)
- 25 July – Guillermo Solá, middle and long-distance runner (died 2020)
- 10 August – Nicolás Díaz, politician and cardiologist (died 2019)
- 26 October – Orlando Cornejo, 37th Mayor of Pichilemu (died 2015)

== Deaths ==
- 30 May – Joaquín Figueroa, politician (born 1863)
- 6 October – Ismael Tocornal, politician and diplomat (born 1850)
- 29 October – Rebeca Matte Bello, sculptor (born 1875)
