= 1934 in Chile =

- Decades: 1910s; 1920s; 1930s; 1940s; 1950s
- See also: Other events of 1934; Timeline of Chilean history

The following lists events that happened during 1934 in Chile.

== Incumbents ==
- President of Chile: Arturo Alessandri

== Events ==
=== June ===
- June to July – Ranquil massacre

== Births ==
- 27 January – Anselmo Sule (d. 2002)
- 16 April – Vicar (cartoonist) (d. 2012)
- 5 August – Guido Mutis (d. 2008)
- 8 November – Eladio Rojas (d. 1991)
- 11 November – Carlos Echazarreta Iñiguez

== Deaths ==
- 11 January – Eugenio Matte
