= Arturo Aldunate Phillips =

Chilean poet, civil engineer and mathematician (1902–1985)

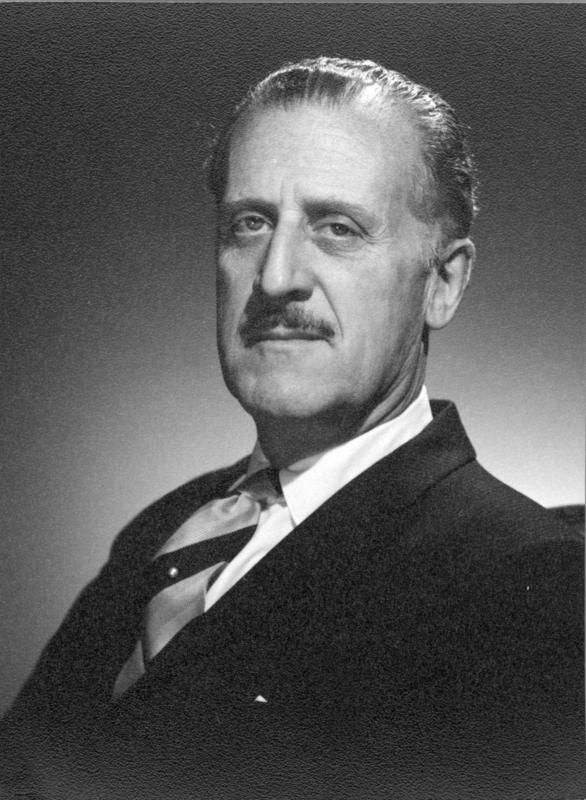
Portrait of Arturo Aldunate Phillips

Arturo Aldunate Phillips (Note: In this Chilean name, the first or paternal surname is Aldunate and the second or maternal family name is Phillips.) (9 February 1902 – 24 June 1985) was a Chilean poet, civil engineer, mathematician, and researcher.

Born in Santiago on 9 February 1902, he won the Chilean National Prize for Literature in 1976 and was a member of the Chilean Academy of the Language.

He died on 24 June 1985.

== Works ==
- Era una sirena, poesía, 1921.
- El problema de las utilidades y la crisis económica actual, ensayo, 1934.
- El nuevo arte poético y Pablo Neruda, ensayo, 1936.
- Federico García Lorca a través de Margarita Xirgú, ensayo, 1937.
- Matemática y poesía, ensayo, 1940.
- Estados Unidos, gran aventura del hombre, ensayo, 1943.
- Pablo Neruda: selección, compilación, 1943.
- Un pueblo en busca de su destino, ensayo, 1947.
- Al encuentro del hombre, ensayo, 1953.
- Albert Einstein, el hombre y el filósofo, biografía, 1956.
- Quinta dimensión, ensayo, 1958.
- Los robots no tienen a Dios en el corazón, ensayo, 1963.
- Por las fronteras de la cibernética, ensayo, 1964.
- Una flecha en el aire y otros ensayos, 1965.
- A horcajadas en la luz, ensayo, 1969.
- Universo vivo, divulgación científica, 1970.
- Hombres, máquinas y estrellas, 1972.
- El amenazante año 2000, futurología, 1975.
- Chile mira hacia las estrellas, divulgación astronómica, 1975.
- Los caballos azules, sobre astronomía y otras ciencias, 1978.
- Mi pequeña historia de Pablo Neruda, 1979.
- Luz, sombra de Dios, acto de fe de un científico, 1982.

== See also ==
- Paul Aldunate Phillips and Raúl Aldunate Phillips, siblings
- Chilean literature
