= 1930 in Chile =

- Decades: 1910s; 1920s; 1930s; 1940s; 1950s
- See also: Other events of 1930; Timeline of Chilean history

The following lists events that happened during 1930 in Chile.

== Incumbents ==
- President of Chile: Carlos Ibáñez del Campo

== Events ==
=== March ===
- 21 March – The Chilean Air Force is established.

== Births ==
- 15 February - Roberto Torretti (d. 2022)
- 8 March – Braulio Musso
- 29 August – Gonzalo Vial Correa (d. 2009)
- 13 July – Lucy López (d. 2026)

== Deaths ==
- 16 July – Juan Luis Sanfuentes (b. 1858)
- 27 August – Evaristo Merino
