= Marcela Serrano =

Chilean novelist

Marcela Serrano (born 1951) is a Chilean novelist. In 1994, her first novel, Para que no me olvides, won the Literary Prize in Santiago, and her second book, Nosotras que nos queremos tanto, won the Sor Juana Inés de la Cruz Prize for women writers in Spanish. She received the runner-up award in the renowned Premio Planeta competition in 2001 for her novel Lo que está en mi corazón. Carlos Fuentes has quoted her description of the modern woman as "having the capacity to change skin like a snake, freeing herself from the inevitability and servitude of more obsolete times."

== Biography ==
Marcela Serrano is the daughter of novelist Elisa Serrana and engineer and essayist Horacio Serrano.

She is considered a "late editor" -- "I began to write at age 38 and recently at age 40, I published my first novel"—even though as a girl she wrote "dozens of books", she threw them all out. That first novel appeared in 1991: We who love ourselves very much, which was an immediate success the next year and later received two prizes. She has published a series of works, one of them was from the "género negro" and other children's books, which is ultimately joined with Margarita Maira, one of her daughters.

== Literary awards ==
- Sor Juana Inés de la Cruz Prize, 1994, Nosotras que nos queremos tanto
- Santiago Municipal Literature Award, 1994, Para que no me olvides
- Premio Planeta, finalist, 2001, Lo que está en mi corazón

== Books ==
- Nosotras que nos queremos tanto, 1991 - Suma de Letras (paperback 2002), ISBN 84-95501-32-5
- Para que no me olvides, 1993
- Antigua Vida Mia, 1995 - tr. Margaret Sayers Peden, Antigua and My Life Before: A Novel, Anchor (2001), ISBN 0-385-49802-0. Filmed by Hector Olivera in 2001.
- Lo que está en mi corazón, - Booket (paperback 2003), ISBN 84-08-04378-1
- El albergue de las mujeres tristes, 1997 - Paperback - Oct 2, 2004
- Nuestra Señora de la Soledad, 1999
- Un mundo raro: Dos relatos mexicanos, 2000.
- Lo que está en mi corazón, 2001
- El cristal del miedo, with Margarita Maira, 2002,
- Hasta siempre, mujercitas, 2004
- La llorona, 2008
- Diez mujeres, 2011
- Dulce enemiga mía, 2013 (collection of short stories)
- La Novena, novela, 2016
