= 1915 in Chile =

- Decades: 1890s; 1900s; 1910s; 1920s; 1930s
- See also: Other events of 1915; Timeline of Chilean history

The following lists events that happened during 1915 in Chile.

== Incumbents ==
- President of Chile: Ramón Barros Luco (until 23 December), Juan Luis Sanfuentes

== Events ==
- 14 March – Chilean parliamentary election, 1915
- 14 March – Battle of Más a Tierra
- 25 June- Chilean presidential election, 1915

== Births ==
- date unknown – Mireya Véliz, actress (d. 2013)
- 10 January – Higinio Ortúzar, footballer (d. 1982)
- 24 February – Carlos Prats, army officer and politician (d. 1974)
- 27 May – Ester Soré, musician (d. 1996)
- 22 September – Bernardino Piñera, Roman Catholic bishop (d. 2020)
- 19 November – Anita Lizana, tennis player (d. 1994)
- 25 November – Augusto Pinochet, army officer and dictator (d. 2006)
- 14 December – José Toribio Merino, admiral (d. 1996)

== Deaths ==
- 2 April – Luis Joaquín Morales
