= 1919 in Chile =

- Decades: 1890s; 1900s; 1910s; 1920s; 1930s
- See also: Other events of 1919; Timeline of Chilean history

The following lists events that happened during 1919 in Chile.

== Incumbents ==
- President of Chile: Juan Luis Sanfuentes

== Events ==
=== May ===
- 14 May – The University of Concepción is established.

== Births ==
- 18 January – Juan Orrego-Salas (d. 2019)
- 3 July – Gabriel Valdés (d. 2011)
- date unknown – René Rojas Galdames (d. 1988)

== Deaths ==
- 20 September – Ramón Barros Luco (b. 1835)
