= 1925 in Chile =

- Decades: 1900s; 1910s; 1920s; 1930s; 1940s
- See also: Other events of 1925; Timeline of Chilean history

The following lists events that happened during 1925 in Chile.

== Incumbents ==
- President of Chile: Luis Altamirano (until 23 January), Pedro Dartnell (until 27 January), Emilio Bello (until 20 March), Arturo Alessandri (until 1 October), Luis Barros Borgoño (until 23 December), Emiliano Figueroa

== Events ==
=== January ===
- 23 January – The 1925 Chilean coup d'état overthrows the September Junta.
- 27 January – The January Junta is established and recalls Arturo Alessandri to the presidency.

=== March ===
- March – Marusia massacre

=== August ===
- 30 August – The Chilean constitutional referendum, 1925 is held. It creates the Chilean Constitution of 1925.

=== October ===
- 1 October – President Arturo Alessandri resigns.
- 22 October – Emiliano Figueroa is elected as president in the Chilean presidential election, 1925.

=== November ===
- 22 November – The Chilean parliamentary election, 1925 is held. The Liberal Party becomes the largest party in the Chamber of Deputies.

== Births ==
- 15 January – Luis Mayanés (d. 1979)
- 19 March – Julio Canessa (d. 2015)
- 26 March – Claudio Spies (d. 2020)
- 9 August – Valentín Pimstein (d. 2017)
- 25 December - Carla Cordua

== Deaths ==
- 2 November – Sofanor Parra (b. 1850)
