= 1922 in Chile =

- Decades: 1900s; 1910s; 1920s; 1930s; 1940s
- See also: Other events of 1922; Timeline of Chilean history

The following lists events that happened during 1922 in Chile.

== Incumbents ==
- President of Chile: Arturo Alessandri

== Events ==
=== November ===
- 11 November – 1922 Vallenar earthquake

== Births ==
- 19 August – Hernán Carvallo (d. 2011)
- 10 December – Lucía Hiriart
- 18 December – Carlos Altamirano (d. 2019)

== Deaths ==
- 21 August – Enrique Mac Iver (b. 1844)
- 8 October – Jorge Montt (b. 1845)
