= 1920 in Chile =

- Decades: 1900s; 1910s; 1920s; 1930s; 1940s
- See also: Other events of 1920; Timeline of Chilean history

The following lists events that happened during 1920 in Chile.

== Incumbents ==
- President of Chile: Juan Luis Sanfuentes (until 23 December), Arturo Alessandri

== Events ==
=== June ===
- 25 June – Chilean presidential election, 1920

== Births ==
- 14 January – Julio Alberto Mercado Illanes (d. 1994)
- 27 June – Fernando Riera (d. 2010)
- 19 September – Gustavo Leigh (d. 1999)
- 15 October – Miguel Busquets (d. 2002)
- 31 October – Francisco Urroz, footballer (d. 1992)

== Deaths ==
- 12 April – Teresa of Los Andes (b. 1900)
