= 1932 in Chile =

- Decades: 1910s; 1920s; 1930s; 1940s; 1950s
- See also: Other events of 1932; Timeline of Chilean history

The following lists events that happened during 1932 in Chile.

== Incumbents ==
- President of Chile: Juan Esteban Montero (until June 4), Arturo Puga (until 16 June), Carlos Dávila (until 13 September), Bartolomé Blanche (until 2 October), Abraham Oyanedel (until 24 December), Arturo Alessandri

== Events ==
=== October ===
- 30 October – Chilean general election, 1932

== Births ==
- 13 April – Orlando Letelier (d. 1976)
- 14 September – Carlos Jauregui (d. 2013)
- 26 October – Manfred Max-Neef (d. 2019)

== Deaths ==
- date unknown – Alberto Edwards (b. 1874)
