= Urraúl Bajo =

- Coat of arms

- Location in Spain
- Coordinates: 42°42′50″N 1°19′20″W
- Country: Spain
- Comunidad Foral: Navarre
- Merindad: Sangüesa
- Comarca: Lumbier
- Judicial district: Agoitz (Aoiz)

Area
  - Total: 59.41 km^{2} (22.94 sq mi)
- Elevation: 455 m (1,493 ft)

Population (2025-01-01)
  - Total: 330
- Time zone: UTC+1 (CET)
  - Summer (DST): UTC+2 (CEST)

Urraúl Bajo (Basque: Urraulbeiti) is a town and municipality located in the province and autonomous community of Navarre, northern Spain. According to the 2014 census, the municipality has a population of 290 inhabitants. The head office of the Global Ecovillage Network is located in the ecovillage Arterra Bizimodu which has been established in Urraúl Bajo in 2014.

Villages
Villages	Population (2014)
Aldunate	15
Artieda	111
Grez	11
Nardués-Aldunate	4
Nardués-Andurra	16
Rípodas	18
San Vicente	29
Sansoáin	19
Tabar	67
