= 1918 in Chile =

- Decades: 1890s; 1900s; 1910s; 1920s; 1930s
- See also: Other events of 1918; Timeline of Chilean history

The following lists events that happened during 1918 in Chile.

== Incumbents ==
- President of Chile: Juan Luis Sanfuentes

== Events ==
=== March ===
- 10 March – Chilean parliamentary election, 1918

== Births ==
- 31 May – Ricardo Echeverría (d. 1970)
- 24 April – Jorge Prat (d. 1971)
- 11 September – César Mendoza (d. 1996)
- 15 September – Margot Loyola (d. 2015)
- 26 September – Fernando Alegría (d. 2005)
- 11 November – Enrique Silva Cimma (d. 2012)
- 26 November – Patricio Aylwin (d. 2016)

== Deaths ==
- 16 February – Rafael Sotomayor Gaete (b. 1848)

== Works of fiction taking place in 1918 Chile ==
- Chilean soap opera Los Pincheira is located in Yerbas Buenas, Chile, in 1918.
