= 1921 in Chile =

- Decades: 1900s; 1910s; 1920s; 1930s; 1940s
- See also: Other events of 1921; Timeline of Chilean history

The following lists events that happened during 1921 in Chile.

== Incumbents ==
- President of Chile: Arturo Alessandri

== Events ==
=== March ===
- 6 March – Chilean parliamentary election, 1921

== Births ==
- 8 March – Sergio Onofre Jarpa (d. 2020)
- 8 June – Carlos González Cruchaga (d. 2008)
- 16 July – Nilo Floody (d. 2013)
- 15 October – Fernando Roldán (d. 2019)

== Deaths ==
- date unknown – Policarpo Toro (b. 1851)
