= 1917 in Chile =

- Decades: 1890s; 1900s; 1910s; 1920s; 1930s
- See also: Other events of 1917; Timeline of Chilean history

The following lists events that happened during 1917 in Chile.

== Incumbents ==
- President of Chile: Juan Luis Sanfuentes

== Events ==
=== May ===
- 7 May – The Graneros Unido football club is established.

== Births ==
- date unknown – José Piñera Carvallo (d. 1991)
- 17 January – Ramón Cardemil (d. 2007)
- 25 May – Roberto Viaux (d. 2005)
- 10 September – Miguel Serrano (d. 2009)
- 4 October – Violeta Parra (d. 1967)
- 20 December – Gonzalo Rojas (d. 2011)

== Deaths ==
- 9 March – Ramón Ángel Jara
- 7 June – Alberto Romero Herrera
