= 1933 in Chile =

- Decades: 1910s; 1920s; 1930s; 1940s; 1950s
- See also: Other events of 1933; Timeline of Chilean history

The following lists events that happened during 1933 in Chile.

== Incumbents ==
- President of Chile: Arturo Alessandri

== Events ==
=== April ===
- 19 April – The Socialist Party of Chile is founded.

== Births ==
- 27 July – Marlene Ahrens (d. 2020)
- 26 October – Raúl Sánchez (d. 2016)
- 28 October – Armando Uribe (d. 2020)

== Deaths ==
- 3 May – Francisco Contreras Valenzuela (b. 1877)
