= 1927 in Chile =

- Decades: 1900s; 1910s; 1920s; 1930s; 1940s
- See also: Other events of 1927; Timeline of Chilean history

The following lists events that happened during 1927 in Chile.

== Incumbents ==
- President of Chile: Emiliano Figueroa (until 10 May), Carlos Ibáñez del Campo

== Events ==
=== May ===
- 22 May – Due to the resignation of President Figueroa, elections are held. Carlos Ibáñez del Campo wins the election and becomes president.

== Births ==
- 14 January – Carlos Camus (d. 2014)
- 25 February - Humberto Giannini (d. 2014)
- 27 June – Gracia Barrios, Chilean painter (d. 2020)
- 26 August – Hernán Figueroa
- 1 September – Arturo Farías (d. 1992)
- 21 October – Sergio Valech (d. 2010)

== Deaths ==
- 3 May – David Arellano (b. 1901)
