= 1926 in Chile =

- Decades: 1900s; 1910s; 1920s; 1930s; 1940s
- See also: Other events of 1926; Timeline of Chilean history

The following lists events that happened during 1926 in Chile.

== Incumbents ==
- President of Chile: Emiliano Figueroa

== Events ==
=== June ===
- An exceptionally stormy and unsettled month in Central Chile produces the wettest and cloudiest month for which reliable records exist in Santiago, where a total of 433.0 millimetres (17.05 in) falls (more than the average annual rainfall) and no more than 51 sunny hours occur all month.

=== October ===
- 12 October to 3 November – The 1926 South American Championship is held in Santiago.

== Births ==
- 14 April – George Robledo (d. 1989)
- 26 May – Antonio Prieto (actor) (d. 2011)
- 20 August – Augusto Barcia (d. 2001)
- 20 December – Misael Escuti (d. 1995)
- 29 December – Lautaro Murúa (d. 1926)

== Deaths ==
- 20 October – Agustín Ross (b. 1844)
- 16 December – Hernán Trizano (b. 1860)
