= Navalsaz =

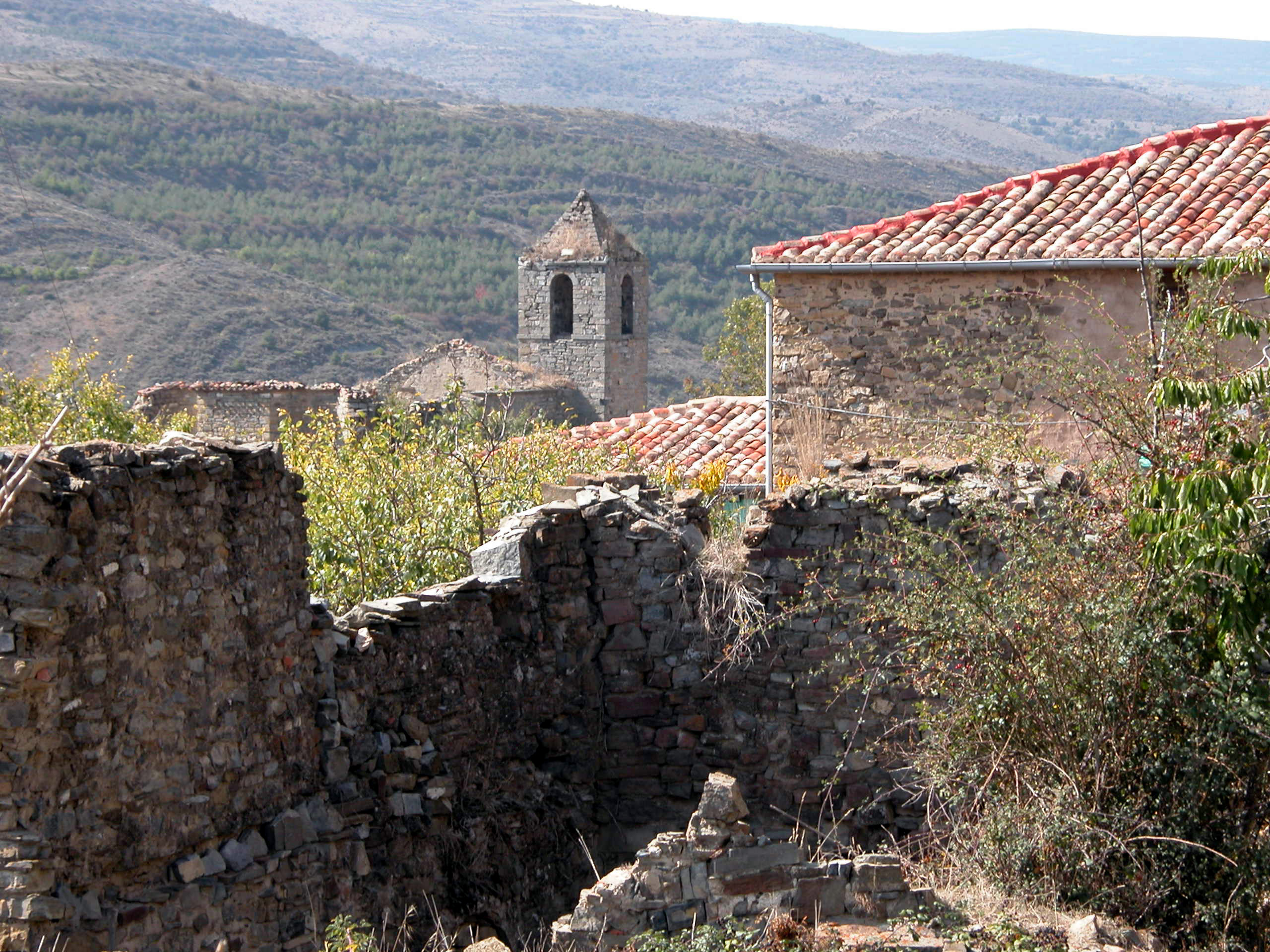
- View of Navalsaz

- Location within La Rioja, Spain Location within Spain
- Coordinates: 42°07′N 2°12′W
- Country: Spain
- Autonomous community: La Rioja
- Comarca: Enciso
- Elevation: 1,007 m (3,304 ft)

Navalsaz is a little village located in La Rioja, Spain. Its population is about 3 or 4 people in winter, and 10 to 15 in summer. It is in the municipality of Enciso.

It is most known for being in the Dinosaur Route, beginning it in Herce.

A notable area within the village is El Calbario, which features the Los Pajares district, characterized by its traditional architecture and residential buildings.

Historically, the economy of the village was based on sheep, but today perhaps tourism is the most important axis of employment in Navalsaz.

Navalsaz festival takes place at the end of July. However, you can find whatever you want about it asking in a bar of Enciso.
