= Luis Aldunate =

Chilean lawyer

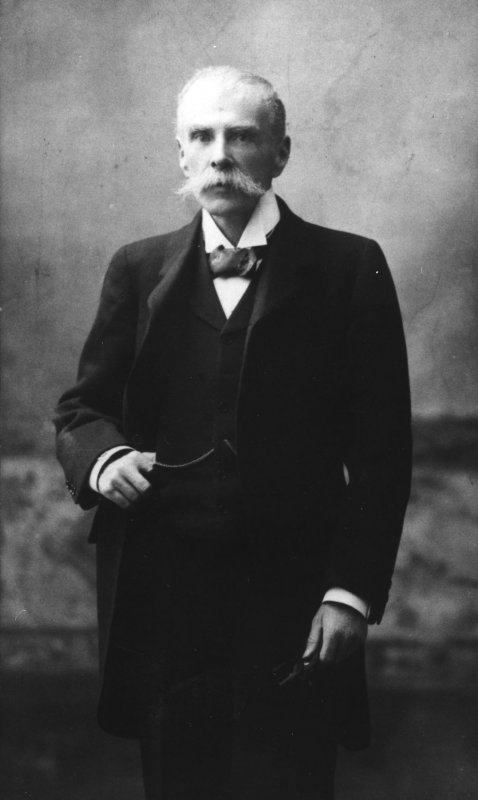

Luis Aldunate Carrera (Note: In this Chilean name, the first or paternal surname is Aldunate and the second or maternal family name is Carrera.) (March 3, 1842 – April 3, 1908) was a Chilean lawyer who served as minister of finance (1881–1882) and minister of foreign affairs (1882–1884). He was a member of the Chamber of Deputies (1876–1885) and Senate (1885–1891).

He was the son of Ambrosio Aldunate Carvajal and Rosa Carrera Fontecilla and his maternal grandparents were José Miguel Carrera and Mercedes Fontecilla.

== Bibliography ==
- Castillo Infante, Fernando; Lía Cortés y Jordi Fuentes (1996). Diccionario Histórico y Biográfico de Chile. Santiago de Chile: Editorial Zig-Zag. p 21.
