= Hernán García de Gonzalo =

Chilean diplomat and academic

Hernán García de Gonzalo de Tejada y Vidal
- Born: December 23, 1928 (age 97)
- Education: University of Miami; University of Pennsylvania; University of Chile
- Occupations: Economist, agriculturist, diplomat
- Title: Lord Descendant of the Old and Illustrious Solar de Tejada
- Spouse: Lorena Coppa Aranda
- Children: Ricardo, Chantal, Simon, Constanza, Pablo, Cynthia, Daniel
- Awards: Great Gold Medallion, Provost of the University of Chile 1977; University of Arica Medal 1978; NASA Recognition 1978; International Executive Service recognition 1978; Lircay Medal 1979; Honorary Degree, National University of Asunción, Paraguay 1980; Great Gold Medallion Andres Bello 1981; Knight of the Most Noble Order of the Crown of Thailand 1987; Knight Commander of the Most Exalted Order of the White Elephant of the Crown of Thailand 1992; Commander of Knighthood of the Most Noble Order of the Crown of Thailand 1997

Hernán García de Gonzalo de Tejada y Vidal (born December 23, 1928), is a retired Chilean diplomat and academic. A former Provost of the University of Chile (1975–1980), former Consul General of Thailand in Chile, Vice-minister of Planning of Chile, and Economist for the United Nations. As the Provost of the University of Chile he was awarded special recognition by NASA, the University of Chile Council of Deans awarded him the Andrés Bello Medal. He was appointed honorary member of the Faculty of Chemistry and Pharmacy at the National University of Asuncion in Paraguay. While serving as the Consul General of Thailand, King Bhumibol Adulyadej Rama IX appointed him Knight of the Most Noble Order of the Crown of Thailand (1987), Knight Commander of the Most Exalted Order of the White Elephant of the Crown of Thailand (1992) and Commander of Knighthood of the Most Noble Order of the Crown of Thailand (1997).

== Family ==
Garcia De Gonzalo coat of arms

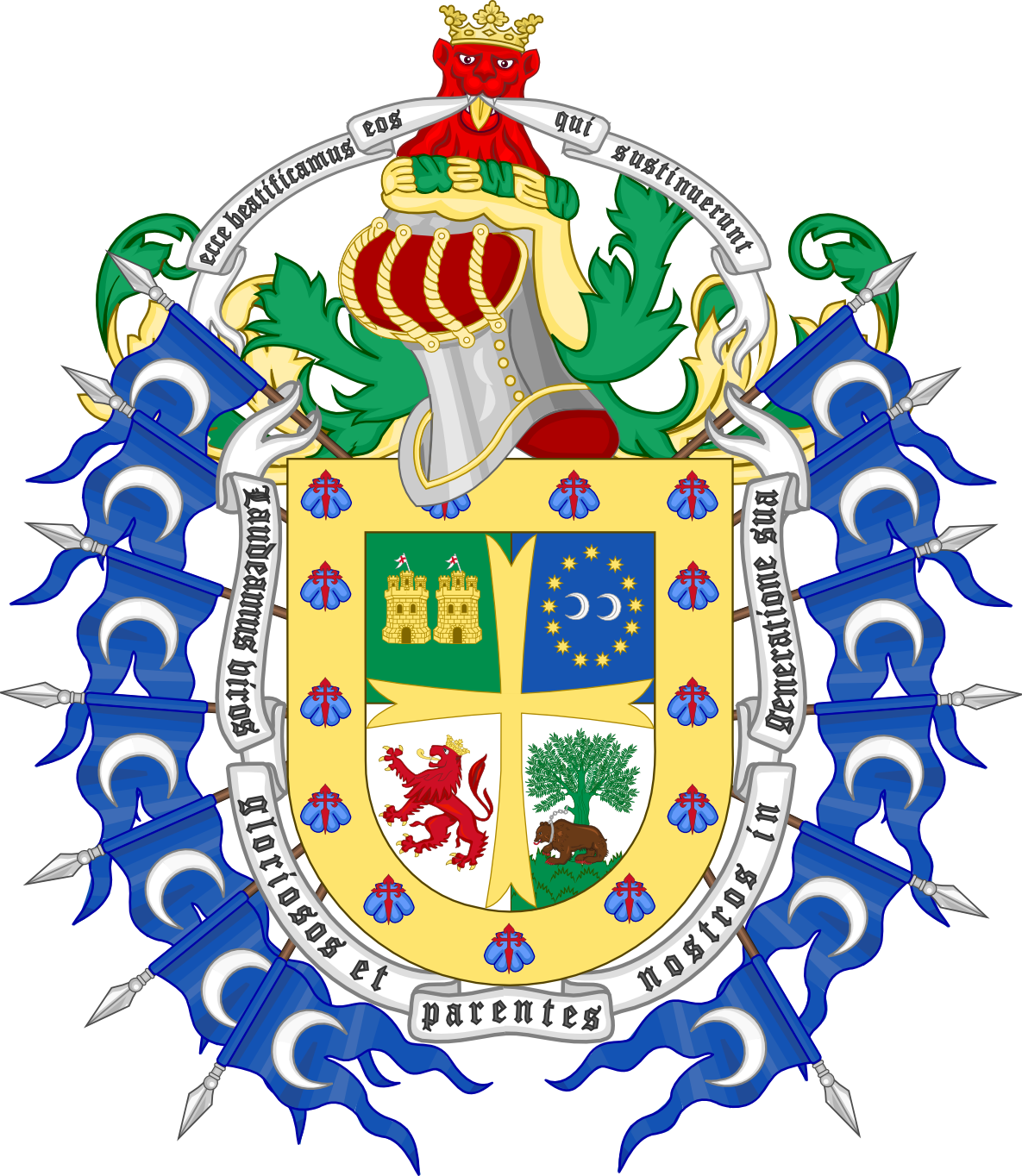
Coat of Arms of the Señorío de Tejada

From his father's side, Hernan Garcia de Gonzalo de Tejada y Vidal belongs to a traditional family from La Rioja (Spain), that for centuries was involved in agriculture and in the defends of the Church-Fortress of St Peter in Enciso. Eight generations of his family are buried in the garden of that same church. His father Mr. Enrique Garcia, born in San Vicente de Munilla, La Rioja, Spain, around the time he was 15 years of age was taken to Casilda, Argentina by his maternal uncles to take care of their properties. After five years Mr. Enrique Garcia was taken to Chile to manage the farms Aucar, el Toro y Chaquihual of 78,000 acres in Chiloé. This was the start of the Garcia De Gonzalo family in Chile.

On the mother side, they were sailors that came from Spain. Hernan Garcia de Gonzalo de Tejada y Vidal's grandfather Juan Vidal Haro owned a passenger ship that took people among the islands south of Puerto Montt. The brothers of Mrs. Juana Vidal were captains of passenger-cargo ships that traveled in and out of Chile, in particular to Australia.

From the old historic books kept at the Diocesan Historic Archive in Logroño it is known that the first member of the Garcia De Gonzalo family is recorded in the first book, page 10, the year 1529 with the name Hernan De Garcia, father of Pedro De Garcia. In 1605 Juan de Garcia y Soto (the young), was granted to add to his last name De Gonzalo as a reward for fighting the Moors for many generations. The first time he used the last name Garcia De Gonzalo was when he married Isabel de Baldecantos, in Enciso. From that moment on the last name Garcia De Gonzalo was used for eight generations. Hernan Garcia Vidal great-grandfather, Faustino Garcia De Gonzalo, was the one that cut off the last name De Gonzalo. Hernan Garcia Vidal, the fourteenth generation, on January 26, 2003, recovered De Gonzalo. The coat of arms was certified in 2012 by Alfonso de Ceballos-Escalera Gila, Duke of Ostuni, Visconti of Ayala, Marques de la Floresta in charge of The board of Castilla y Leon, by the Royal Decree of July 29, 1915.

Hernan Garcia de Gonzalo y Vidal on October 7, 2012, was received and enrolled in the Solar de Tejada as a legitimate descendant of Hernan García born in Enciso around 1498. He was the father of Pedro Garcia (1529), grandfather of Juan de Garcia y La Solana (1565) and great-grandfather of Juan de Garcia y Soto (1585). The latter was granted the privilege of adding De Gonzalo to his last name because he belonged to the lineage and family of Tejada, where one of the 7 children of General Sancho Fernandez de Tejada was named Gonzalo.

As a legitimate descendant, Hernan Garcia de Gonzalo y Vidal holds honorary and nobility rights such as the use of de Tejada as part of his last name and the exclusive use of the Coat of Arms, blazon described in the Royal Cedula of Henry IV, given in Valladolid the 1st. of September 1460, confirmed by the Catholic Monarchs, the Emperor Charles V and his successors until King Juan Carlos I in 1981.

Today Hernan Garcia De Gonzalo de Tejada y Vidal lives in Miami married to Lorena Coppa Aranda and has two sons and one daughter, Ricardo, Simon, and Chantal. From previous marriages, he has two sons and two daughters, Pablo, Daniel, Constanza, and Cynthia.

== Education ==
Garcia De Gonzalo attended high school at the Liceo Blanco Encalada de Talca, Chile. As a teenager his main intellectual and political influence came from his father. He entered to study at the University of North Carolina in 1948, then transferred to the University of Miami, Florida, USA, where he graduated in 1953 in Engineering Science and Mechanical Engineering. In 1957 he studied for two years in the Center of Economic Planning of the University of Chile, where he obtained a Master in Economic Planning. In 1961 the Organization of American States granted him a fellowship to study Regional Economics at Wharton School of the University of Pennsylvania in Philadelphia were in 1963 he graduated with a Master in Regional Science. In 1973 he got a Diploma in University Administration from the United States Agency for International Development. In 1977 he studied for a short period at the University of Southern California, at the School of Education where he specialized in Higher Education.

== Career ==
After he graduated from the University of Miami in 1953, he entered to work at the Department of Engineering at the Pacific Steel Company in Huachipato, Talcahuano, Chile. From 1955 to 1956 he was in charge of the inventory of the entire plant. After working at the Pacific Steel Company, Shell Chile hired him for the Technical Department, where he worked from 1956 to 1958. Shell would later award Hernan Garcia De Gonzalo de Tejada y Vidal with a grant to study economics at the Graduate School of Economics of the University of Chile. After finishing his degree at the University of Chile he was awarded a fellowship by the Organization of American States to study at the University of Pennsylvania. When he returned in 1963 he entered to work at the United Nations' CEPAL in Santiago, as an industrial economist with the task to localize the main industries and sources of hydroelectric power in Latin America. At the same time in 1963, he inherited from his father the Santa Margarita farm that produced wine, rice, and cattle. Ten years later, he would buy the Santa Julia farm for breeding cattle and increase the production of rice.

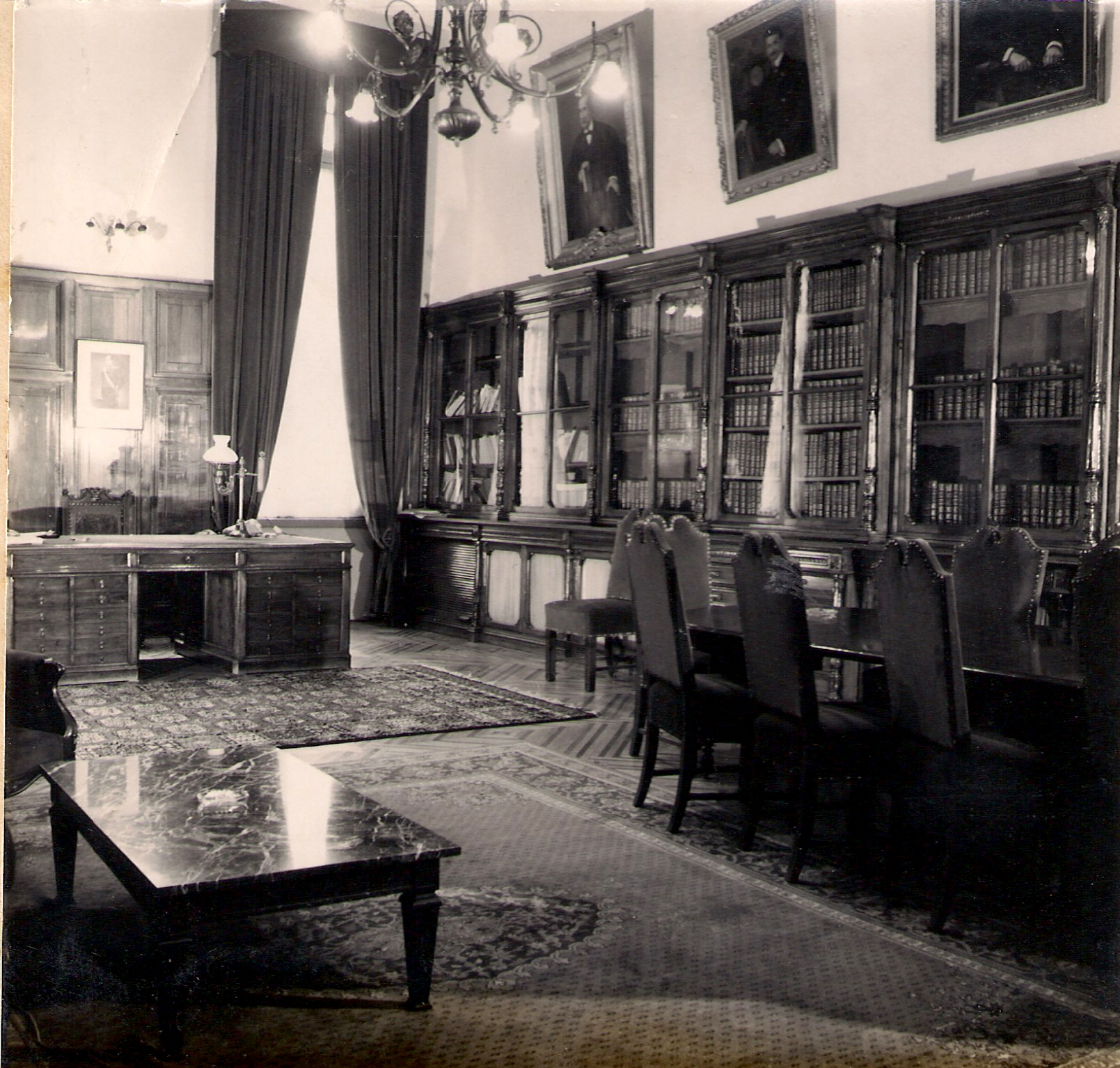
Garcia De Gonzalo de Tejada Office of the Prorector

In 1966 the University of Chile hired him as a full professor to teach and do research at the Department of Economics. He taught space economy to graduate students at Escolatina and basic economics and statistics to undergraduate students at the School of Economy and Administration till 1973. During this period President Salvador Allende appointed him, professor Carlos Cruz-Coke and other professionals to study the exploitation of the Caliche, a mineral with a low percentage of nitrate. In 1970 he was appointed Director of the School of Economics and Administration. Due to political instability in the country, the School was divided in the North School based in Marxian economics and the South School based in Keynesian economics. He remained the Director of the Keynesian School until the end of 1973. In January 1971 President Allende sent him for two months to visit 17 countries to research the possible technical collaboration to his government; including a new port in Talcahuano and the factory of bearings offered by Russia. At the beginning of 1974, he was appointed Undersecretary of Regional Planning, where he was in charge of the Physical and Administrative Regionalization of Chile, originating the Development Regional Fund and the Codecos and Coderes. In 1976 he was appointed to the University of Chile as Prorector, his obligation was to administrate the university in the economics and academic aspect. For better administration, he divided the university into eight branches with a Vice-rector at the head of the institution. He established the seed to create eight regional universities that would help to develop the regions. Every year the Prorector discussed with the Vice-rector of the region and the Deans the budget for every school and departments. The University of Chile in those days had around hundred thousand students and a staff of 12 thousand professors, assistant professors and academicians dedicated full-time to research. As the President of the University Publishing Company, he had to deal with the books that were going to be printed. He rebuilt the University Hospital J.J. Aguirre and bought new equipment for the surgery rooms. He also bought the land and a building for the School of Economy and Administration and established the School of Architecture on the same campus. He was able to reach an agreement with the government of USA for the acquisition of a large size computer and with the University of California to run the Cyclotron that was donated by this university. He approved a new construction for the School of Science and founded the magazine that reported the activities of the university. Garcia De Gonzalo signed cultural agreements with many universities in the world including with the University of Hokkaido in Japan, National University of Asunción in Paraguay, Federal University of Rio de Janeiro in Brazil, Cairo University in Egypt, Central University of Ecuador, etc. He organized the Center for the Development of Easter Island and wrote the regulation for the admission of foreign students and native minorities as Araucanians, Aymaras, Easter Island students, etc.

Hernan Garcia De Gonzalo with Frank Pace

From 1976 to 1980 Hernan Garcia De Gonzalo de Tejada y Vidal was vice-president of the Board of the National Electric Company - Endesa, his obligation were to direct the board of the company, making decisions concerning the expansion of the company, in new electric power plants, modern equipment, relationship with the workers, etc. During those same years, he was President of the largest Publishing Company of Chile, Editorial Universitaria. In 1976 he was appointed a member of the Board of the International Executive Service Corps of New York, founded in 1964 by David Rockefeller and with members such as Frank Pace and other important people of Latin America. His task was to establish the need of specialists that Chile and other Latin America countries required for their development. Between 1977 and 1980 he was a member of the Board of the National Council of Television, and after being Pro-rector, he directed the Institute of Regional Studies that for political reasons was closed in 1982 by General Medina who was the President of the University of Chile at that moment. That same year he founded the Research Corporation in Regional Science, and in 1983 became President of the Corporation of National Studies, the corporation's fundamental task was to prepare cultural events to promote national culture in the country and abroad. In October 1983 he organized the Nationalist Party with Carlos Cruz-Coke, Pablo Rodriguez Grez among others, and on 1987 became a Constituent Member of the National Renewal (Chile) Party signing the Public Deed on August 4 of that year.

In 1980 he was appointed by the King of Thailand Bhumibol Adulyadej, Honorary Consul General as his representative in Chile, he represented Thailand for 19 years until 1999. During that time he was awarded by the King all the honors, making him Knight Commander of the Main Orders of Knighthood. In the year 2001, he emigrated with his family to the USA where his main purpose was the education of his children.

He also took part in the following events:

1. President of the foreign students at the University of Pennsylvania 1961.
2. United Nation Delegate to the Industrial Symposium for the Integration of Latin America in Buenos Aires, Argentina 1965.
3. Delegate of the United Nation, CEPAL to San Pablo's conference on Industrial Project Methodology, 1974 Brazil.
4. Director of the following Seminaries of Chilean economy: Valdivia 1963, La Serena 1965, Temuco 1966, Iquique 1967, Puerto Montt 1969.
5. Technical Secretary of the Luso, Hispano American Assembly for Tourism 1969.
6. The Promotion Corporation of Chile appointed him to the committee "New Development of Chile", 1979 - 1980.
7. Seminar on Regionalization: Reality and Perspectives, Corporation of Regional Studies, Concepcion, Chile, August 3, 1984.

== Publications ==
1. The Aluminum Industry and its Optimal Location in Latin America (1970)
2. The Regional Economic Plan for Chile (1975)
3. Resources of Chile (1975)
4. Formulation of Objectives and Politics of the University of Chile (1979)
5. Illustrated History of the Pacific War 1879-1884 (1979)
6. Chile Essence and Evolution (1982)

== Art collection ==
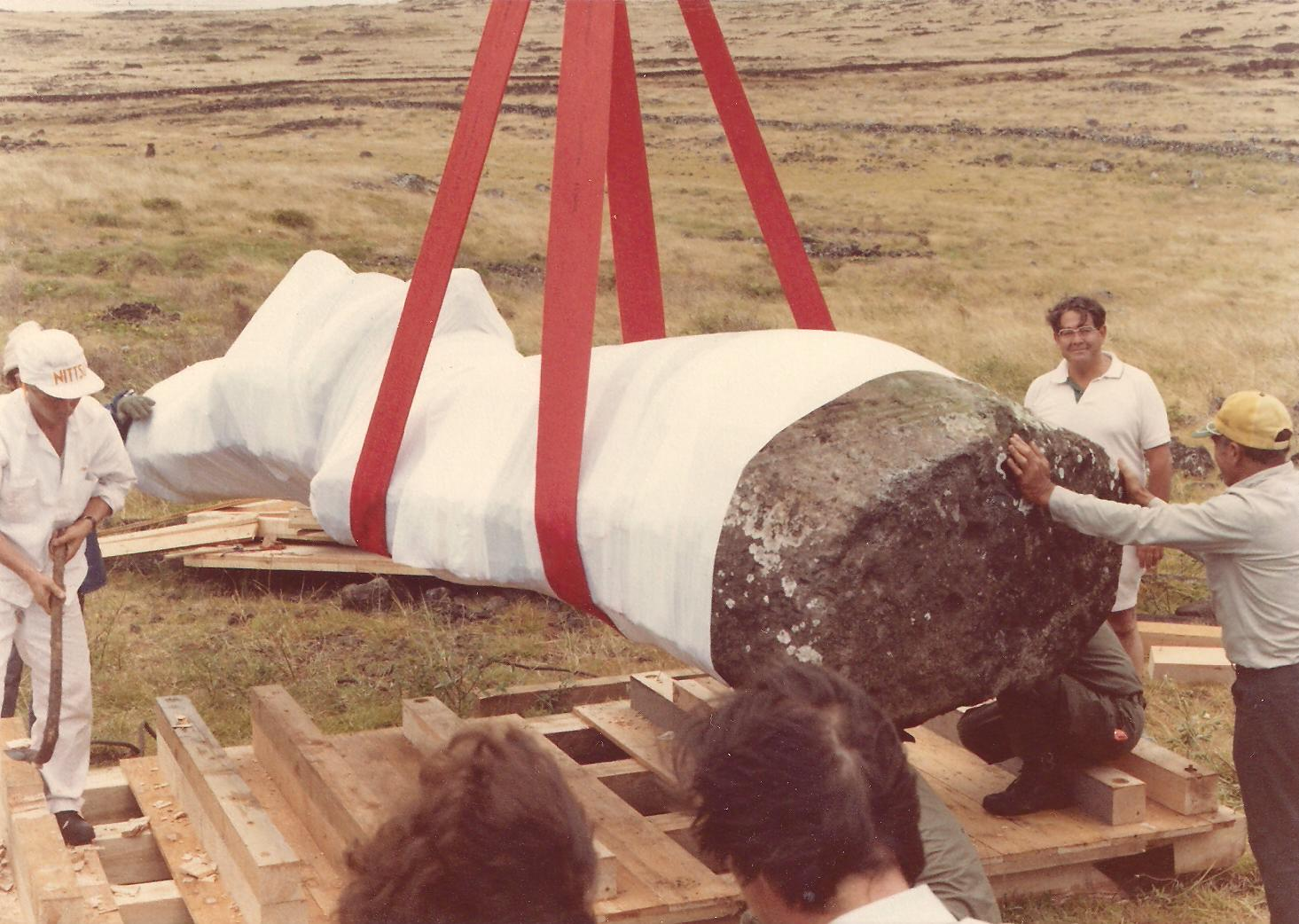
Hernan Garcia De Gonzalo de Tejada y Vidal supervising the transportation of the Moai out of Easter Island.

Hernan Garcia De Gonzalo de Tejada y Vidal is also known to have organized many art exhibitions around the world. In particular, he was in charge of the Moai exhibition in Osaka and Tokyo(1982) where over a million people visited including Crown Prince Naruhito. Garcia De Gonzalo also helped find funding through the Japanese company Toppan Printing for the Easter Island Museum on the island.

Some of his private pieces have been exhibited in different museums in and out of Chile; His Moai kavakava was on display at the Museum of the University of Pennsylvania (1962), and some of his other pieces have been shown at the National Library of Chile and the Cultural Center of Las Condes in Santiago. In this Center he participated in the exhibition called "Easter Island, the Man, Art and his Surrounding" in September 1988. He organized many exhibitions of paintings at the Foundation Gallery. He has sold national and European paintings, among the Chilean painters, Nemesio Antunes, Roberto Matta, Francisco Corcuera, R. Villaseñor; the European Félix Ziem, Joaquín Sorolla, Andrés Cortes, and Doris Delaminay.

Other known pieces in his collection include; A painting by Jacques-Antoine Vallin (1760–1837), old Triptych from Russia and Greece, and Tapestries "Kalagas" from Burma.

Painting by Jacques-Antoine Vallin owned by Hernan Garcia De Gonzalo.
