= Juan Silva (footballer, born 1990) =

Chilean footballer

Personal information
- Full name: Juan Ignacio Silva Naranjo
- Date of birth: 29 September 1990 (age 36)
- Place of birth: La Serena, Chile
- Position: Midfielder

Youth career
- Deportes La Serena

Senior career*
Years	Team	Apps	(Gls)
2010–2012	Deportes La Serena	8	(0)
2013–2014	Deportes Melipilla	20	(3)
2015	Deportes Ovalle	8	(0)
2017–2020	Unión Bellavista	–	(–)
- * Club domestic league appearances and goals

Juan Ignacio Silva Naranjo (born 29 September 1990) is a Chilean former footballer who played as a midfielder.

== Career ==
Silva's first club were Chilean Primera División team Deportes La Serena. He made his professional debut on 30 January 2010 during a 2–4 loss to Universidad de Chile. Seven more appearances arrived between 2010 and 2012, including two in 2012 which ended with relegation to Primera B de Chile. In January 2013, Silva joined Deportes Melipilla of Segunda División de Chile. He was sent off on his third tier debut in an away loss to San Antonio Unido on 23 February. Two years later, Silva signed for Segunda División side Deportes Ovalle. Eight appearances followed as Ovalle were relegated to the Chilean Tercera División.

In 2017, Silva began featuring for regional amateur ANFA club Unión Bellavista from Coquimbo.

== Personal life ==
As well as being a footballer, Silva also plays as the lead drummer for his band, D'Brous.

== Career statistics ==
As of 24 September 2020.

Club statistics
Club	Season	League			Cup		League Cup		Continental		Other		Total	
Club	Season	Division	Apps	Goals	Apps	Goals	Apps	Goals	Apps	Goals	Apps	Goals	Apps	Goals
Deportes La Serena	2010	Primera División	2	0	0	0	—		—		0	0	2	0
Deportes La Serena	2011	Primera División	4	0	3	0	—		—		0	0	7	0
Deportes La Serena	2012	Primera División	2	0	3	0	—		—		0	0	5	0
Deportes La Serena	Total		8	0	6	0	—		—		0	0	14	0
Deportes Melipilla	2013	Segunda División	20	3	0	0	—		—		0	0	20	3
Deportes Melipilla	2013–14	Segunda División	0	0	0	0	—		—		0	0	0	0
Deportes Melipilla	Total		20	3	0	0	—		—		0	0	20	3
Deportes Ovalle	2015–16	Segunda División	8	0	0	0	—		—		0	0	8	0
Career total			36	3	6	0	—		—		0	0	42	3
