= José Aldunate =

Chilean teacher, priest and human rights activist

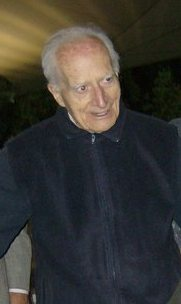
- José Aldunate in 2010
- Born: José Aldunate Lyon; June 5, 1917; Santiago, Chile
- Died: September 28, 2019 (aged 102)
- Occupation: Society of Jesus
- Years active: 1952–2019

professor of ethics, worker priest and defender of human rights
- In office 1952–2019

José Aldunate Lyon (June 5, 1917 – September 28, 2019) was a Society of Jesus and Chilean teacher, worker, priest and human rights activist during the military dictatorship. He was awarded the National Prize for Human Rights in 2016.

== Biography ==
=== First years ===
He was born in Santiago, Chile, the son of Carlos Aldunate Errázuriz and Adriana Lyon Lynch, and was the second of four siblings: Carlos, the eldest, plus two younger sisters, María and Pelagia.

From a wealthy family, he was educated by governesses brought from England, so he learned to speak English before Spanish. In 1928, the Aldunate Lyon family moved to England, where they remained until 1930. José Aldunate studied at the Jesuit college Stonyhurst College, in Lancashire, with his brother Carlos, while his sister attended Saint college in London. For José Aldunate, his time in England was decisive:

I had some success in rugby and I was successful in the studio, the first years but not the last ones. Generally in the first year, even in English, he beat the others. "I had no problem in terms of language. That was my English period. It was not very long, from 1928 to 1930. However, they were very decisive years in my life. We can say that I forged my character, who I was." José Aldunate

José Aldunate dedicated the first months of 1933 to his profession. Finally, he found answers in reading the stories of the disciples of St. Francis of Assisi and in February he decided to become a Jesuit which is a scholarly religious congregation of the Catholic Church.

"They chose that life, to travel around the world on foot without carrying anything, living on charity, speaking to the people of God. The idea of leaving the ordinary life attracted me a lot. That to marry, to have a farm, to manage and have a lot of money or responsibilities did not come to me at all."

José Aldunate

=== Formation, positions and missions in the Society of Jesus ===
In March 1933, José Aldunate entered the Jesuit Novitiate in Chile. On April 1, 1935, he made his first religious profession of vows as a member of the Christian Schools. He moved to Argentina for the first years, then he went to Antofagasta for his Magisterium, during which he taught at San Luis school. Later, he returned to Argentina to finish his studies in Theology. On December 23, 1946, he was ordained as a priest in San Miguel, Buenos Aires. He then traveled to Europe to study Religious Studies and Ethics, first in Rome, then in the Pontifical Gregorian University and, finally, in the Catholic University of Leuven (1835–1968). He got his doctorate degree in economics and ethics at the school of Luigi Taparelli D'Azeglio.

In 1950, he returned to Chile. His first task, entrusted by the provincial Father Álvaro Lavín, was to assist Father Alberto Hurtado in the Chilean Trade Union Action (ASICH), something of great interest for Aldunate, made possible relating Ethics and Economics, the subject of his graduation thesis. The inheritance left to José Aldunate by Father Hurtado was two main lessons: the importance of justice and the helping of the poor.

"There came a time when Father Hurtado understood that the decisive things were not charity, kindness, doing good, but justice. Society must first seek justice, which is beyond charity. You have to be fair in the first place and then think about being charitable. A businessman had to pay fair wages and then he could do charity." José Aldunate

In addition to his work at the ASICH, José Aldunate began his work as a professor of ethics at the Pontifical Catholic University of Chile in Santiago. In 1952 he was also Master of Novices; then, director of the Message magazine and director of the Center of Sociocultural Investigations CISOC-Bellarmine; finally, he was named Provincial of the Jesuits in Chile.

The 1960s were marked by changes in the world and in the Church, with the Second Vatican Council, which defined the course of Aldunate.

=== Life as a Jesuit worker ===
Although it was a normal thing in his career to ascend and learn, for Father José Aldunate, life took another direction. While a Director of the Jesuits of Chile, he decided to become a worker priest.

I had fulfilled my Provincial duties, then I felt freer. I said why I didn't try a little insertion in the workers' world? If I was talking about justice in my class as an ethics teacher, I had a feeling that I was not taking responsibility for what the justice really is. Jesus says that not the one who speaks out but the one who does the will of God complete it. I remembered "Father Gatica", who preaches did not practice. I did not want to be a Father Gatica, but I saw that I did not approach the one who suffered injustice. José Aldunate

In 1973, he received an invitation from a Dutch priest Juan Caminada, and accepted attending a month of contemplation in order to become a worker priest, in Calama. For Caminada, a worker priest must become a true worker to rethink his vocation and the Church, since, for him, only a real insertion makes it possible to comment on how the Church should be renewed. Father Aldunate moved to Calama to join 14 priests and live with them for a month of contemplation, and then interrupted by a week of work in Chuquicamata and he finished in August 1973, anyone who discerned and wanted to continue in the movement. Father Aldunate took the option of becoming a worker, "but without leaving the chair, being a worker who teaches ethics not only in theory but in the same praxis." In practice, he decided to be a worker for six months of a year and continue with his academic work at the Catholic University for the other six months, a routine education that he maintained for about five years.

== See also ==
- Religious congregation of the Catholic Church
- Pontifical Gregorian University
