= Guido Mutis =

Guido Mutis Carrasco
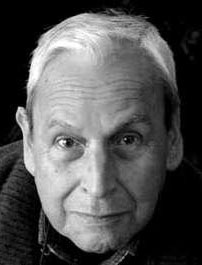
- Born: 5 August 1934; Yungay, Chile
- Died: 10 July 2008 (73 years); Valdivia, Chile
- Occupation: Professor of English literature

Guido Mutis Carrasco (5 August 1934 in Yungay, Chile – 10 July 2008 in Valdivia, Chile) was an English literature professor at the Valdivia campus of the Austral University of Chile and director of the Valdivia International Film Festival. During his life he made important contributions to national cinema studies and Chilean literature.

== Education ==
Guido studied to be an English professor at the Universidad de Chile. He finished his bachelor's degree in 1959 and then completed a master's degree at the Central Connecticut State University, United States, in 1960 after receiving a Fulbright scholarship. In 1972, he carried out post-graduate studies at the University of East Anglia, Great Britain.

== Teaching ==
Guido entered the Austral University on 10 April 1961. During his academic career he was employed as head of the Language Department between 1966 and 1969, director of the Literature and Culture Area of the Department (1976–1990), director of the Institute of English and North American Literature (1976–1990), director of the Language Institute (1976–1990), vice-dean of the Faculty of Philosophy and Letters (June 1968 - August 1969) and dean of the same faculty (29 November 1968 – 10 August 1969).

Between 1961 and 2002, he gave a range of courses about the English language, literature, fiction, cinema, and cinematic appreciation. Then in 2003 and 2004 he taught classes in literature and cinema, Hispano-American literature, and Latin American cinema at the University of Oregon, USA.

== Other work ==
Guido was active in directing seminars and frequently published articles in specialized journals. He also assisted in scientific events both in Chile and internationally. In the central and southern regions of Chile, he held workshops and gave talks in many different cities including those as a representative of the Ministry of Education (Chile).

Outside the academic world, he developed work involved with literature and cinema. Among his own personal works, he wrote stories, plays and a musical comedy and directed videos which were presented in a number of cinematographic events. He also worked in radio, and had a radio programme dedicated to music and cinema on Radio UACH, the university radio station.

== Influences ==
Mutis's favourite genre was film noir, and in his later years he greatly admired the work of the Canadian director David Cronenberg. A tribute published by the Austral University of Chile in 2018 described him as a lifelong admirer of Jane Austen and of the films based on her novels. He also admired the poet Dylan Thomas, and one of Thomas's poems was read at his funeral in July 2008. He was a keen lover of music as well, which a colleague recalled at the same ceremony.

His interest in the links between literature and cinema carried into his teaching. In his final years at the university, he taught a course on film and television discourse in the master's programme in communication and taught Latin American cinema to exchange students from Central Washington University. Shortly before his death, he had completed a literature and film workshop at the university's Cine Club.

== Director of the Valdivia International Film Festival ==
Before becoming director, Mutis had worked closely with the festival's organising team at the university's Cine Club, mainly on artistic matters. In April 2007, the festival's board of directors unanimously chose him to lead the event because of his academic career and his knowledge of film. The appointment was made official on 5 April 2007 by the university's rector, Víctor Cubillos. He succeeded Lucy Berkhoff, who had directed the festival without a break since its first edition in 1994. Mutis said the decision had not been easy, as the post meant a major change in his life, but he felt it was time to act and contribute to the city and the university.

He directed the 14th festival, held from 5 to 10 October 2007. It was organised by the Austral University of Chile and produced by the Centro Cultural de Promoción Cinematográfica de Valdivia. His main aim was to bring the festival closer to the people of Valdivia and make it a city-wide event. Plans included free screenings for local school pupils, outreach to low-income groups with little access to cinema, and a long-term goal of making Valdivia an audiovisual centre that would support Chilean film production. The programme included showcases of Brazilian, Australian and Basque cinema and a tribute to the German filmmaker Fred Kelemen. The festival opened on 5 October at the newly renovated Teatro Cervantes, and its guests included Kelemen and the American film critic Jonathan Rosenbaum.

The 2007 festival was the only one Mutis directed, as he died in July 2008 while preparing the 15th edition. At the launch of that edition in Santiago later that month, Odette Hidalgo, president of the Centro Cultural de Promoción Cinematográfica de Valdivia, announced that no new director would be appointed and that Mutis would remain the festival's leader for its 15th edition.

== Death and Afterwards ==
Guido died on 10 July 2008 in the midst of preparing the 15th Festival which occurred between 3 and 8 October and was dedicated to his legacy and memory. He was buried in Valdivia.

He has been remembered in works of literature including the publication "Gárgola. La Aventura del Espectáculo" by poet and mathematician Lionel Henríquez who launched the book, which Guido had been involved with, in the professor's memory. At a remembrance service at the Austral University to pay hommage to Guido, an extract from his unpublished autobiographic novel "Fragmentos de la Historia de Nikos" was read by the Valdivian musician José Manuel Izquierdo.
