= Gustavo Parraguez =

Interim Mayor of Pichilemu
- In office 6 December 2008 – 12 December 2008
- Preceded by: Hernán Garrido Salas
- Succeeded by: Roberto Córdova Carreño
- In office 12 September 2007 – 23 November 2007
- Preceded by: Víctor Rojas González
- Succeeded by: Marcelo Cabrera Martínez
- In office April 1992 – 6 December 1992
- Preceded by: René Maturana Maldonado
- Succeeded by: Orlando Cornejo Bustamante

Municipal secretary of Pichilemu
- In office 1967?–?
- Preceded by: Carlos Rojas Pavez
- Succeeded by: ?

Personal details
- Born: 24 May 1943 (age 82) Pichilemu, Chile
- Spouse: Zoila Margarita González Gaete

Gustavo Osvaldo Parraguez Galarce (born 24 May 1943) is the municipal secretary of Pichilemu, and was the interim Mayor of the commune of Pichilemu three different times, in 1992, 2007, and 2008.

== Biography ==
Parraguez Galarce was born on 24 May 1943 in Pichilemu, in current Cardenal Caro Province, Region of O'Higgins, Chile. His parents were Víctor Luis Parraguez and Enedina del Carmen Galarce Labarca de Parraguez. One of his brothers is Eduardo Parraguez Galarce, Mayor of Pichilemu between 1975 and 1979. He married Zoila Margarita González Gaete (27 July 1944 – 13 January 2007) on 5 January 1967, in Pichilemu.

=== Political career ===
Gustavo Parraguez Galarce apparently succeeded Carlos Rojas Pavez as the municipal secretary of Pichilemu, after the latter was elected Mayor of the commune, in 1967. In April 1992, following the resignation of appointed mayor René Maturana Maldonado, Parraguez became the interim mayor of Pichilemu, and held the office until 6 December 1992, when Orlando Cornejo Bustamante took office.

Once again, Parraguez Galarce became the Interim (Subrogant) Mayor until the city council could elect a new mayor, in September 2007, following the imprisonment of Víctor Rojas González. There were several unsuccessful attempts to choose a mayor, until 23 November 2007, when the councilors elected Marcelo Cabrera Martínez as the successor of Rojas González.

One year later, in 2008, following the prohibition to hold public offices on Marcelo Cabrera, Parraguez Galarce was sworn in as mayor of Pichilemu on 6 December 2008 in a public ceremony, until the city council chose a successor to Cabrera. Parraguez handed over his position to Roberto Córdova six days later, making his tenure the shortest for a mayor of the commune.

Parraguez was chosen as one of the "Persons of the Year of 2008" by local newspaper El Expreso de la Costa, in December 2008. He was recognized as one of the civil servants at the local municipality with the longest career, lasting for 44 years as of the newspaper's writing. Parraguez was described as "conducting the municipality [as interim mayor] with special care, as he perfectly knows the different administrative processes because of his experience years and the studies he has had, being totally apt for the office."

Political offices
Preceded by René Maturana Maldonado; Víctor Rojas González; Hernán Garrido Salas	Mayor of Pichilemu (interim); 1992; 2007; 2008	Succeeded by Orlando Cornejo Bustamante; Marcelo Cabrera Martínez; Roberto Córdova Carreño
