= Carlos Rojas (footballer, born 1928) =

Chilean footballer (1928–1963)

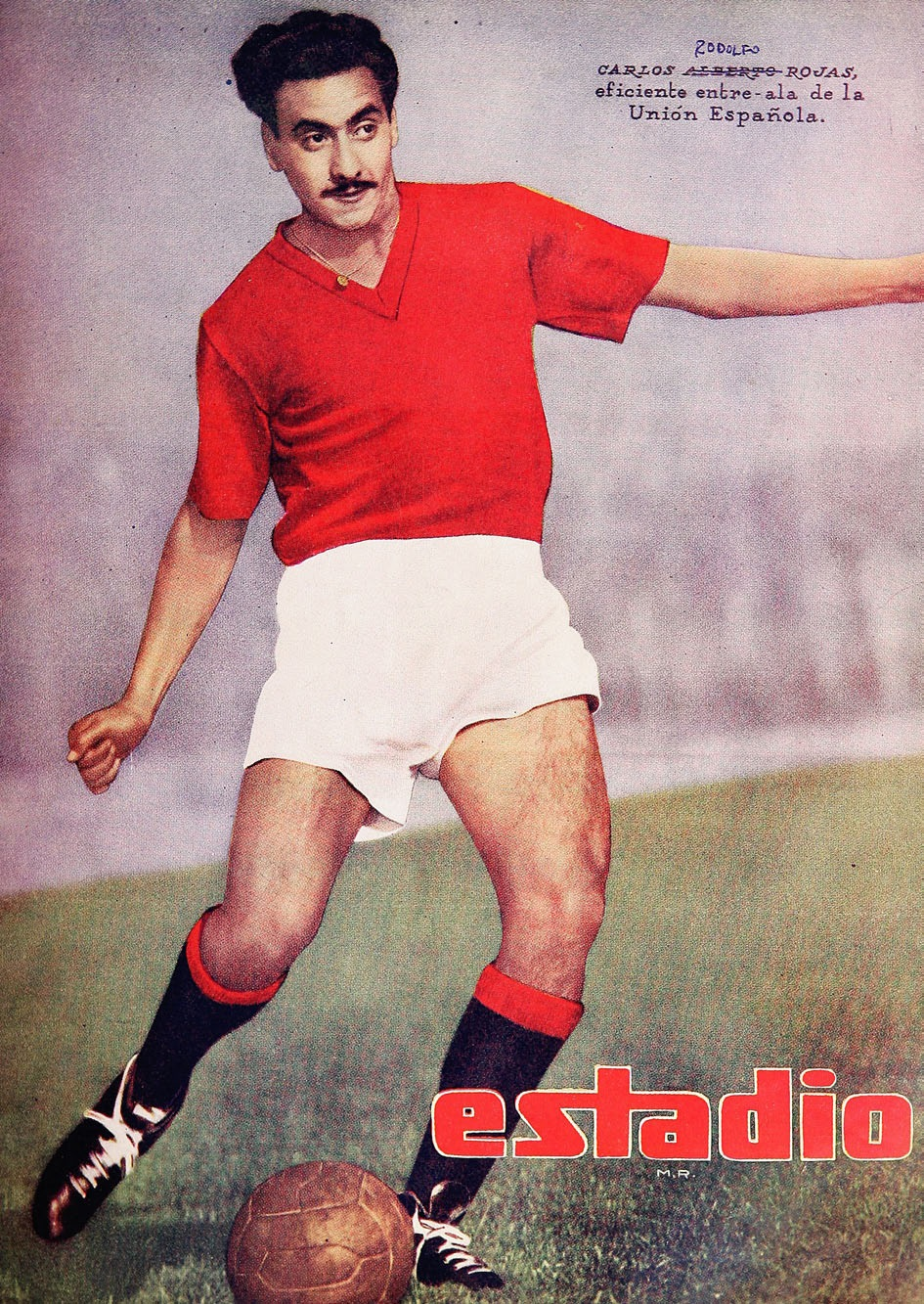
- Rojas with Unión Española in 1948

Personal information
- Full name: Carlos Rodolfo Rojas Rojas
- Date of birth: 19 July 1928
- Place of birth: Rancagua, Chile
- Date of death: 7 May 1963 (aged 34)
- Place of death: Santiago, Chile
- Position: Midfielder

Senior career*
Years	Team	Apps	(Gls)
1946–1953	Unión Española		
1954–1956	Palestino		

International career
1949–1954	Chile	17	(1)
- * Club domestic league appearances and goals

Carlos Rodolfo Rojas Rojas (19 July 1928 – 7 May 1963) was a Chilean football midfielder who played for Chile in the 1950 FIFA World Cup.

== Career ==
At club level, Rojas played for Unión Española and Palestino.
