= Orlando Cornejo =

- Cornejo during the re-inauguration of the Centro Cultural Agustín Ross in 2009

37th Mayor of Pichilemu
- In office 26 September 1992 – 6 December 1996
- Preceded by: René Maturana Maldonado; Gustavo Parraguez Galarce (interim)
- Succeeded by: Jorge Vargas González

Personal details
- Born: 26 October 1929 Cáhuil, Pichilemu Chile
- Died: 20 April 2015 (aged 85) Pichilemu, Chile
- Party: Union of the Centrist Center (UCC)
- Spouse: María Soledad Cornejo Vargas (2007–present)
- Occupation: Tourism entrepreneur, civil servant

Orlando Cornejo Bustamante (26 October 1929 – 20 April 2015) was the 37th Mayor of the commune of Pichilemu, office which he held between September 1992 and December 1996, representing the Union of the Centrist Center (UCC). He was the first mayor of Pichilemu to be elected following the Chilean transition to democracy. In 1996 and 2000, he ran again as a candidate in the municipal elections of these years, but failed to be elected in either.

== Early life ==
Cornejo Bustamante was born on 26 October 1929 in the village of Cáhuil, Pichilemu, in current Cardenal Caro Province, Region of O'Higgins, Chile. His parents were Jermán Luis Cornejo Becerra and Ester Bustamante de Cornejo. He married María Soledad Cornejo Vargas (born 20 November 1963) in Rengo, Cachapoal Province, Region of O'Higgins, on 22 November 2007.

Cornejo was described in a Pichilemu News article from 2011 as "not a very literate person, but criterious, honest."

== Political career ==
Orlando Cornejo Bustamante ran as a candidate in the 1992 municipal election, held in June of that year, representing the Union of the Centrist Center (UCC). He was elected mayor, after obtaining 634 votes (10.72%) out of 5,915. He took office on 26 September of that year, along with councilors Aldo Polanco Contreras, Raúl Tobar Pavez, Jorge Vargas González, Mario Bichón Cáceres, and Mariano Polanco Galarce. Cornejo was the first mayor of Pichilemu to be elected in democracy, after the military regime of Augusto Pinochet Ugarte ended.

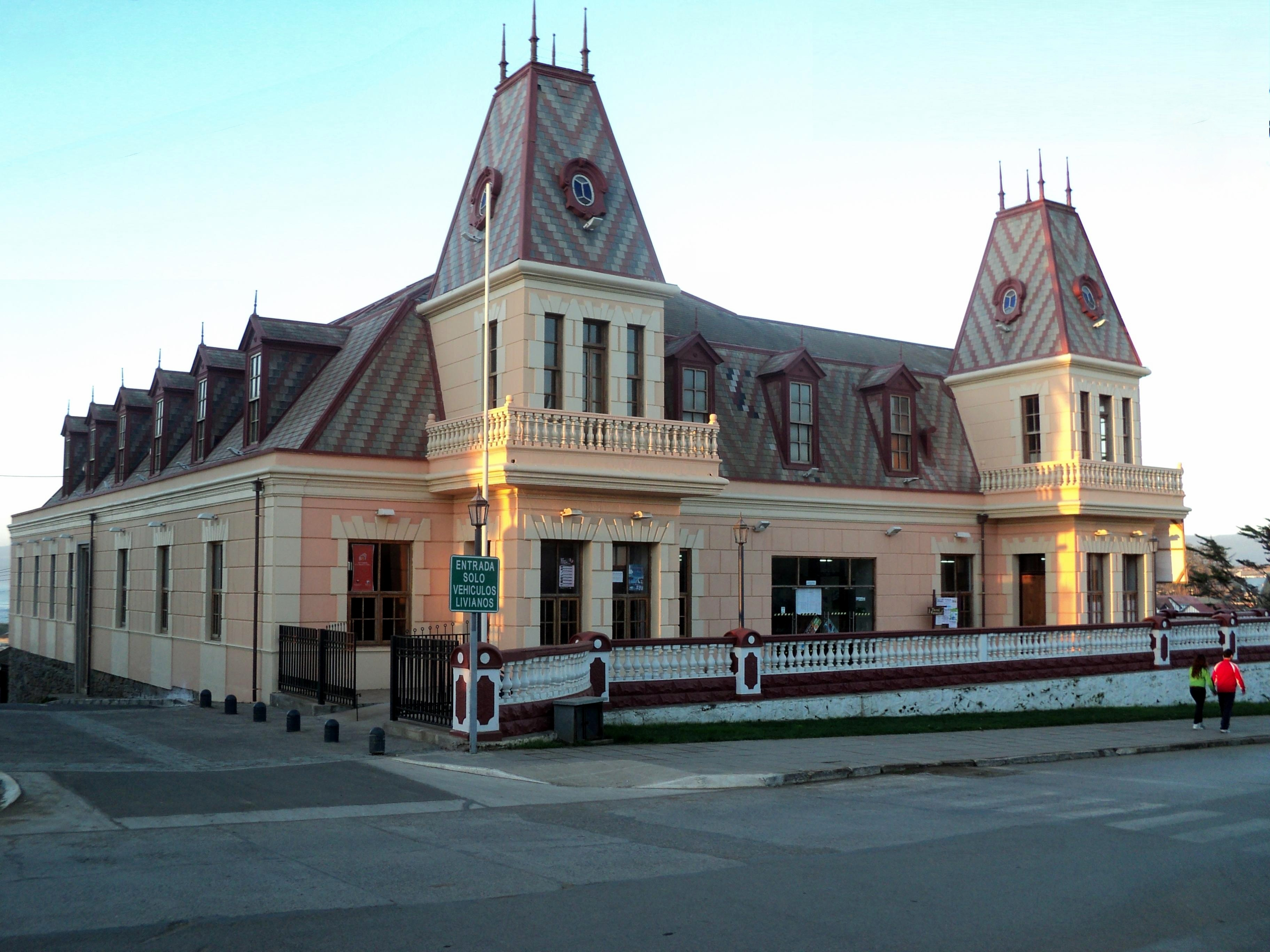
The former Agustín Ross casino was purchased during Cornejo's mayorship

Among Cornejo's work as mayor of Pichilemu, in 1995, he purchased for the Municipality of Pichilemu the former Agustín Ross Casino, now turned into a cultural center. The purchase was made with the support of the Pichilemu City Council, composed through the term of 1992–96 by Aldo Polanco Contreras, Jorge Vargas González, Mario Bichón Cáceres, Mariano Polanco Galarce, and Raúl Tobar Pavez, for 30 million pesos (approximately US$60,000). Cornejo created a police control booth in the entrance of Pichilemu, near the local cemetery, which has "proved effective helping that crimes affecting other beach resorts do not occur" in Pichilemu. He also contracted monitors to instruct locals of Pañul to work with clay, and gave kiosks to local artisans at the Avenida Costanera Cardenal José María Caro. In 1994, along with President of the Chamber of Tourism of Pichilemu Washington Saldías González, Cornejo requested the National Monuments Council the designation of the Pichilemu historical centre as a "typical zone" (zona típica). The proposal was approved ten years later, on 1 September 2004, thereby naming the area comprising most of the Avenida Agustín Ross area, including the Agustín Ross hotel, former casino, and park.

Orlando Cornejo's mayorship has been qualified as "one of the best administrations of Pichilemu in democracy" by conservative National Renewal (RN) politician Aldo Polanco Contreras, who went on to say in an October 2008 interview with El Expreso de la Costa that "he [Cornejo] would not do anything if it was wrong, because he asked people who are knowledgeable in administrative matters in the municipality and so he had never any trouble."

In 1996, Cornejo ran as a candidate in that year's municipal election, as an independent supported by the List B, of right-wing candidates. However, he failed to be elected, as he obtained 216 votes (3.40%) out of 6,352. He unsuccessfully ran again as a candidate in the 2000 election, as an independent supported by the List D, of his former Progressive Union of the Centrist Center party. Cornejo obtained 86 votes (1.35%) out of 6,370.

== Other work ==
Cornejo is a member of the Chamber of Commerce of Pichilemu. In the organization's fortieth anniversary, Cornejo Bustamante was awarded as a "collaborator of the commune's commerce." He is also a member of the Club Deportivo Independiente de Pichilemu, sports club which he also directed. He owns a residencial (small hotel), which for several years served as the headquarters of Independiente.

== Death ==
Cornejo died on 20 April 2015 in Pichilemu, Chile, at 85. His health was "delicate" in recent times, and was in custody of his family.

Political offices
Preceded by René Maturana Maldonado; Gustavo Parraguez Galarce (interim)	Mayor of Pichilemu; 1992–1996	Succeeded by Jorge Vargas González
