= Juan Silva (footballer, born January 1989) =

Uruguayan footballer

Personal information
- Full name: Juan Carlos Silva Suárez
- Date of birth: 15 January 1989 (age 37)
- Place of birth: Montevideo, Uruguay
- Height: 1.84 m (6 ft 1/2 in)
- Position: Defender

Senior career*
Years	Team	Apps	(Gls)
2006–2012	Juventud	23	(0)
2007	→ Bella Vista (loan)	4	(0)
2009–2010	→ Central Español (loan)	0	(0)
2013	Tacuarembó	1	(0)
- * Club domestic league appearances and goals as of 09:37, 19 February 2018 (UTC)

Juan Carlos Silva Suárez (born 15 January 1989) is a Uruguayan footballer who plays as a defender. He is currently a free agent.

== Career ==
Silva started his career in 2006 with Juventud. He remained until 2012 after twenty-three appearances over seasons in the Uruguayan Primera División and the Uruguayan Segunda División. During his Juventud career, Silva was loaned out twice to Primera División teams. In 2007, Silva joined Bella Vista and made four appearances. In 2009, Silva signed for Central Español but failed to feature; though was an unused substitute once in December 2010 against Danubio. He departed Juventud in 2012 and, in 2013, subsequently joined Tacuarembó of the Segunda División. He made just one appearance for Tacuarembó.
