= Raúl Aldunate Phillips =

Chilean writer

Member of the Chamber of Deputies
- In office 15 May 1957 – 15 May 1961
- In office 15 May 1945 – 15 May 1949

Personal details
- Born: 29 December 1906
- Died: 26 December 1979 (aged 72)
- Party: National Party
- Parent(s): Emilio Aldunate; Emilia Phillips
- Relatives: Paul Aldunate Phillips (brother)

Raúl Aldunate Phillips (Note: In this Chilean name, the first or paternal surname is Aldunate and the second or maternal family name is Phillips.) (29 December 1906 – 26 December 1979) was a Chilean writer, politician, and soldier.

== Biography ==
Raúl was the son of Emilio Aldunate Bascuñán and Emilia Phillips Huneeus. Raúl married a woman by the name of María Teresa Menéndez Montes, with whom he had five children. Raul studied at the Andrés Bello Institute in Santiago, Chile, before entering Military School. In Military School he obtained the rank of 2nd Lieutenant in 1927.

== Military career ==
Raul served as an assistant to the Commander-in-Chief of the Army and was deputy director of the Army Memorial. He also stood out for his services in the General Staff, reaching the rank of Captain on 22 September 1938. Among the most important military commissions assigned, were the designations as military attaché in China and Japan, as well as that of professor of the Army Cavalry School.

== Founder of the Civil Defence of Chile ==
At the beginning of 1941, the General staff of the Army, concerned to meet the needs of the national defence of the country, arranged for Captain Raúl Aldunate Phillips, an officer who was in the United States, to study the problems within that country. Related to civil defence and protection of the population.

Being commissioned by the Chilean State to study the situation of the mechanisms and systems related to Civil Defence in the United States during the 1940s, after formally presenting the respective reports and creating the defence organ in question, he was the first General Director of the Civil Defence of Chile.

== Political career ==
Raúl was elected deputy for the twenty-fifth department grouping of Ancud, Castro, and Quinchao in the period 1949–1953, a faction for which he was re-elected for the period of 1957–1961. He also served as a deputy replacing the Permanent Commission on Foreign Affairs and joined the Permanent Commission of National Defense, as well as the Permanent Commission of External Relations.

He was appointed Delegate of Chile at the International Labour Conference in 1941, and with the rank of minister, attended the transfer of power in Argentina in 1945.

== Other highlighted actions ==
He was Vice President of the Exploratory Society of Chiloé and Destilory of Quellón and member of the Society of Writers of Chile.
