= Jorge Hübner =

Chilean lawyer and politician

Deputy of the Republic of Chile for Santiago's 1st District
- In office 1961 – 1965

Personal details
- Born: Jorge Iván Hübner Gallo; April 11, 1923 Santiago, Chile
- Died: December 17, 2006 (aged 83) Las Condes, Santiago, Chile
- Party: Conservative Party; United Conservative Party
- Education: University of Chile
- Occupation: Lawyer, professor & politician

Jorge Hübner (Santiago, 11 April 1923 - Las Condes, Santiago 17 December 2006) was a Chilean lawyer, professor and politician.

== Early life ==
The son of the couple formed by the famous Chilean poet Jorge Hübner Bezanilla (impossible love of Gabriela Mistral) and Ofelia Gallo Schiavetti, Hübner Gallo, after studying in Europe and at the San Ignacio School, went on to study philosophy at the Pedagogical and Law Institute of the University of Chile's Law School, where he was a professor until the day of his death. For a long time he also taught at the Barros Arana National Boarding School. Of conservative opinion, he joined the Conservative Party and later the National Party. He received his doctorate in 1950 under the direction of José Ortega y Gasset.

== Career ==
As a student, he was elected president of the University of Chile Student Federation in 1946. He served as a deputy for the district of Santiago Centro from 1961 to 1965, and directed the Library of the National Congress of Chile from 1975 until the return of democracy in 1990. During the military dictatorship of Augusto Pinochet, he served as an advisor to the State Defense Council and advisor to the Ministry of Foreign Affairs.

During his period as Director of the Library of the National Congress of Chile, the Legal and Legislative Data Bank was designed and put into operation. This meant the automation of several functions of the Library, which expanded and expedited its consultation, reference and research services. But in this field there was still much to be done. Thus, in 1990 with the restoration of democracy, the National Congress reopened its sessions in the new institutional building in Valparaiso.

He was a member of the board of directors of the National Publisher Gabriela Mistral. Editor of El Estanquero and El Diario Ilustrado. Correspondent of the newspaper ABC de Madrid and representative of ABC de las Américas.

He was a member of the Legislative Commission I, of the Governing Board between January 4, 1976, and March 30, 1981. He was also a member of the First Legislative Commission on the Constitution, Economy, Development and Reconstruction, Finance and Mining, from April 1, 1981, to 1989.

In addition, he was a founding member of the Chilean Association of Journalists, as well as of the Board of Trustees of the Chilean Institute of Hispanic Culture and the Chilean Society of Philosophy and its president in 1974.

The Italian Government decorated him with the Star of Italian Solidarity.
