= Ricardo Yrarrázaval Larraín =

Chilean painter and ceramist

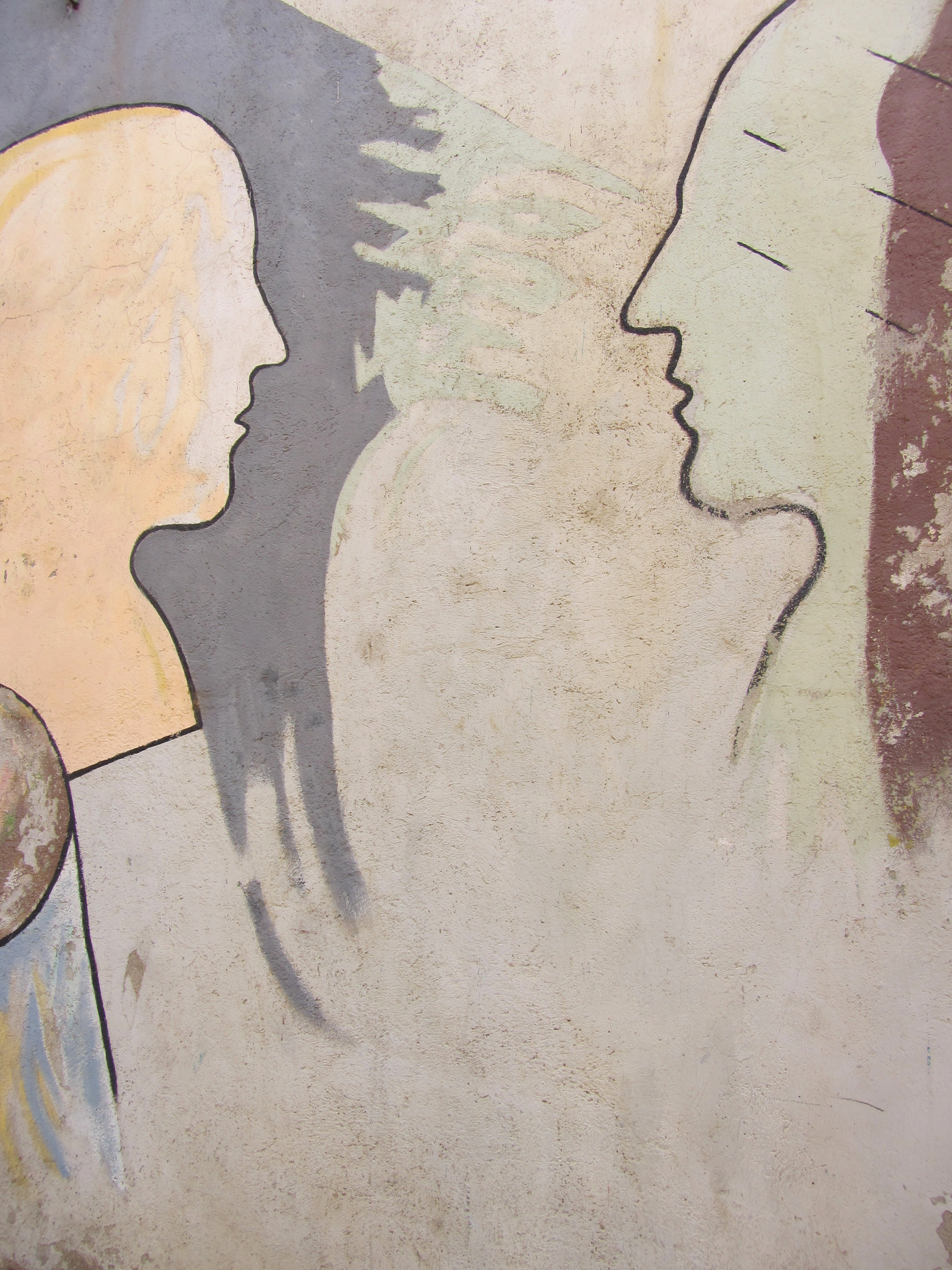
- Silhouettes in backlight Museum Open Pit Valparaíso
- Born: Ricardo Yrarrázaval Larraín; October 12, 1931; Santiago, Chile
- Known for: Painter and ceramist

Ricardo Yrarrázaval Larraín (born October 12, 1931) is a Chilean painter and ceramist. The central theme of his work is man and his status in society.

== Biography ==
He is born in Santiago and his artistic vocation awoke at an early age. After enrolling on a ship bound for Egypt, traveled to Naples and Rome, where he entered the School of Fine Arts to study painting.

Later, the Italian capital left and went to France to finally settle in Vallauris, a small village on the Riviera, where Picasso had also resided. There he became acquainted with the techniques of pottery, an activity that was spent for several years and it has never completely abandoned.

In 1966 he received a Guggenheim Fellowship to work for a year in New York.

His pictorial production is low but intense. After some abstract experiences, in which he played with geometric shapes that were composing vertical frames, in the 1970s his work became surrealistic and began painting in a style called subjective realism and which would later evolve into the goal. The characters in his paintings are figures of flat volumes and distorted shapes that represent archetypes of modern society.

The many awards he has received include the second prize of the Biennale de Lima (1968) and first prize in painting contest I National Securities Placement Chile (1975).
