= Enciso, La Rioja =

Enciso
- Municipality
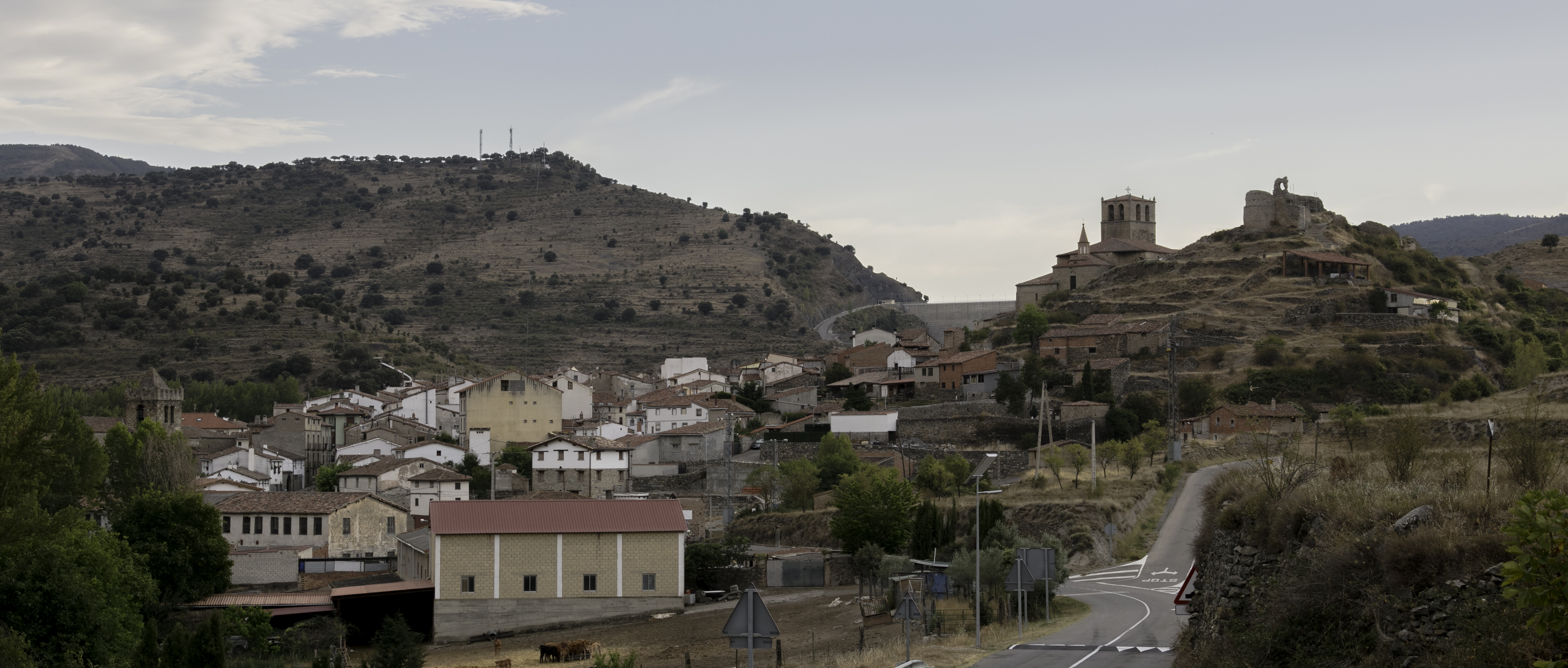
- Skyline of Enciso

- Coat of arms

- Location within La Rioja, Spain Location within Spain
- Coordinates: 42°08′56″N 2°16′09″W
- Country: Spain
- Autonomous community: La Rioja
- Comarca: Arnedo

Government
  - Mayor: Ricardo Ochoa (PP)

Area
  - Total: 69.69 km^{2} (26.91 sq mi)
- Elevation: 783 m (2,569 ft)

Population (2025-01-01)
  - Total: 167
- Postal code: 26586

Enciso is a small municipality (pop. 159 (2007)) in the southern part of La Rioja, Spain, near Arnedo. The main village rises is located above the Cidacos River.

Numerous trace fossils of dinosaurs have been found in the area and there is a museum specialized in paleontology in Enciso. The dinosaur has become an emblematic animal of this town.

== Demography ==
Enciso has been steadily losing permanent population. From a total of 1,237 inhabitants in 1900, it had only 159 in the 2009 census.

== Villages ==
Enciso's municipal term encompasses several smaller populated places, including Navalsaz. Located on a bend of the river, almost depopulated Las Ruedas de Enciso is a popular place for hikers and sightseers.

== See also ==
- List of municipalities in La Rioja

== Gallery ==
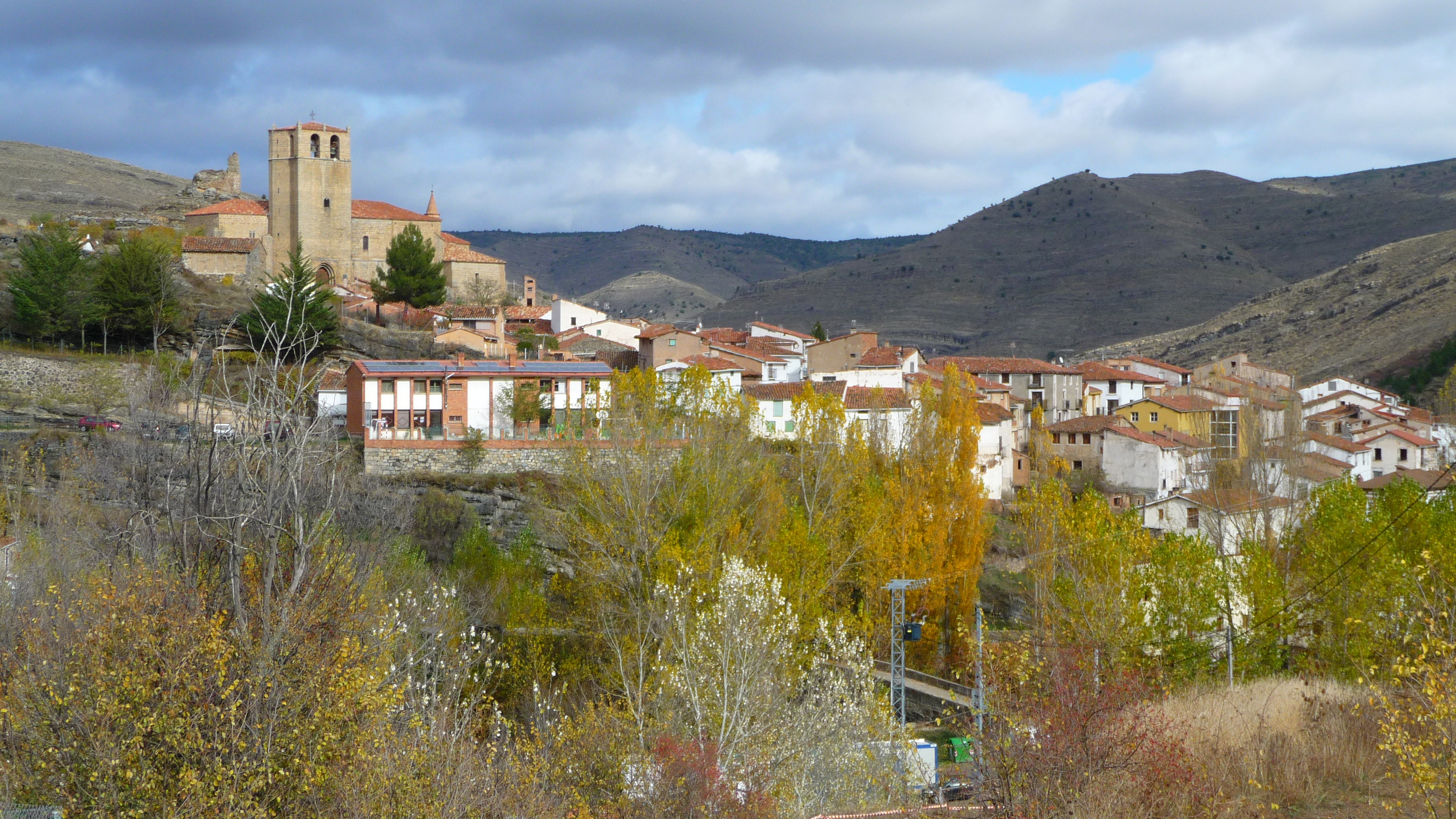
View of Enciso

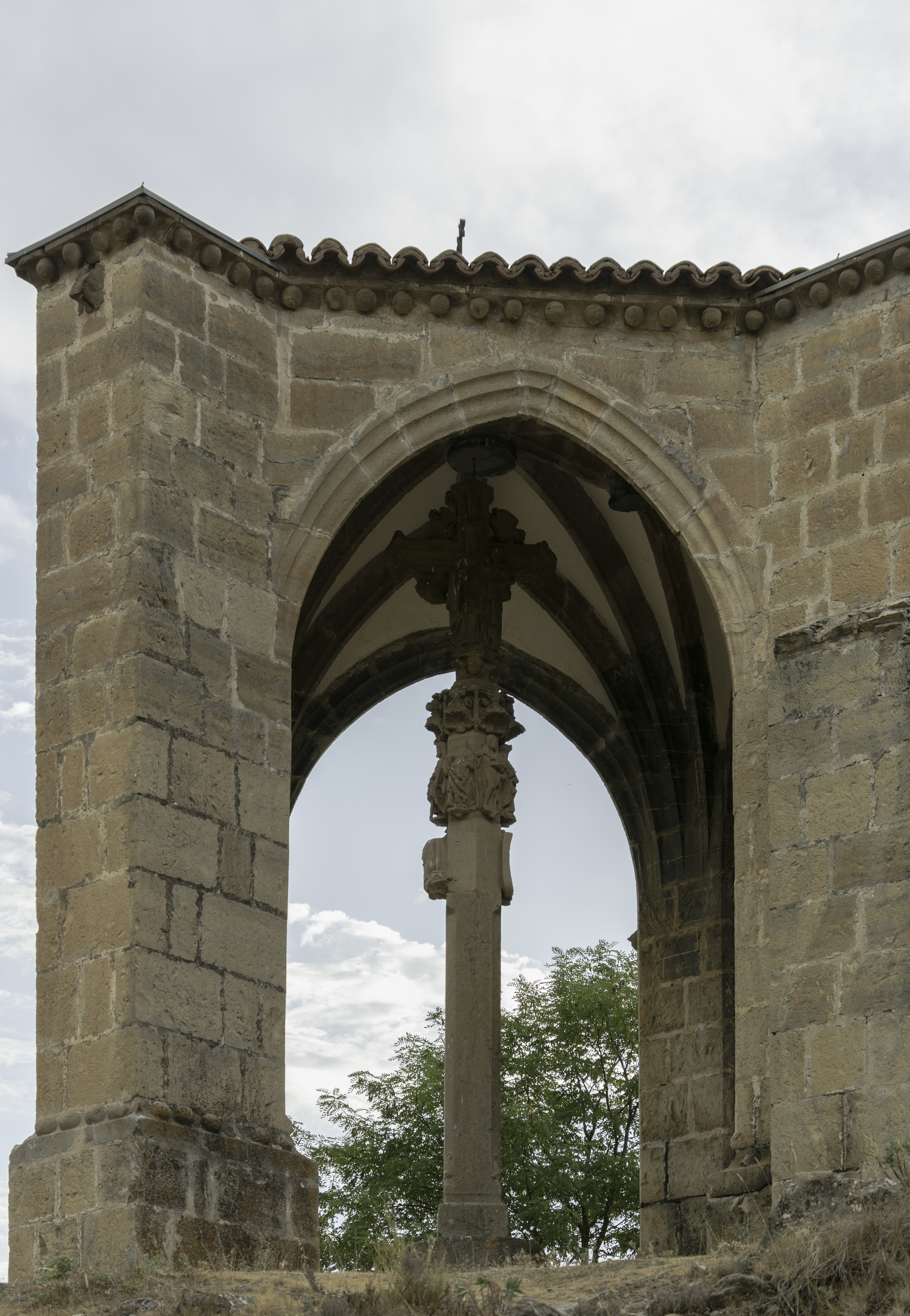
Waycross of La Concepción

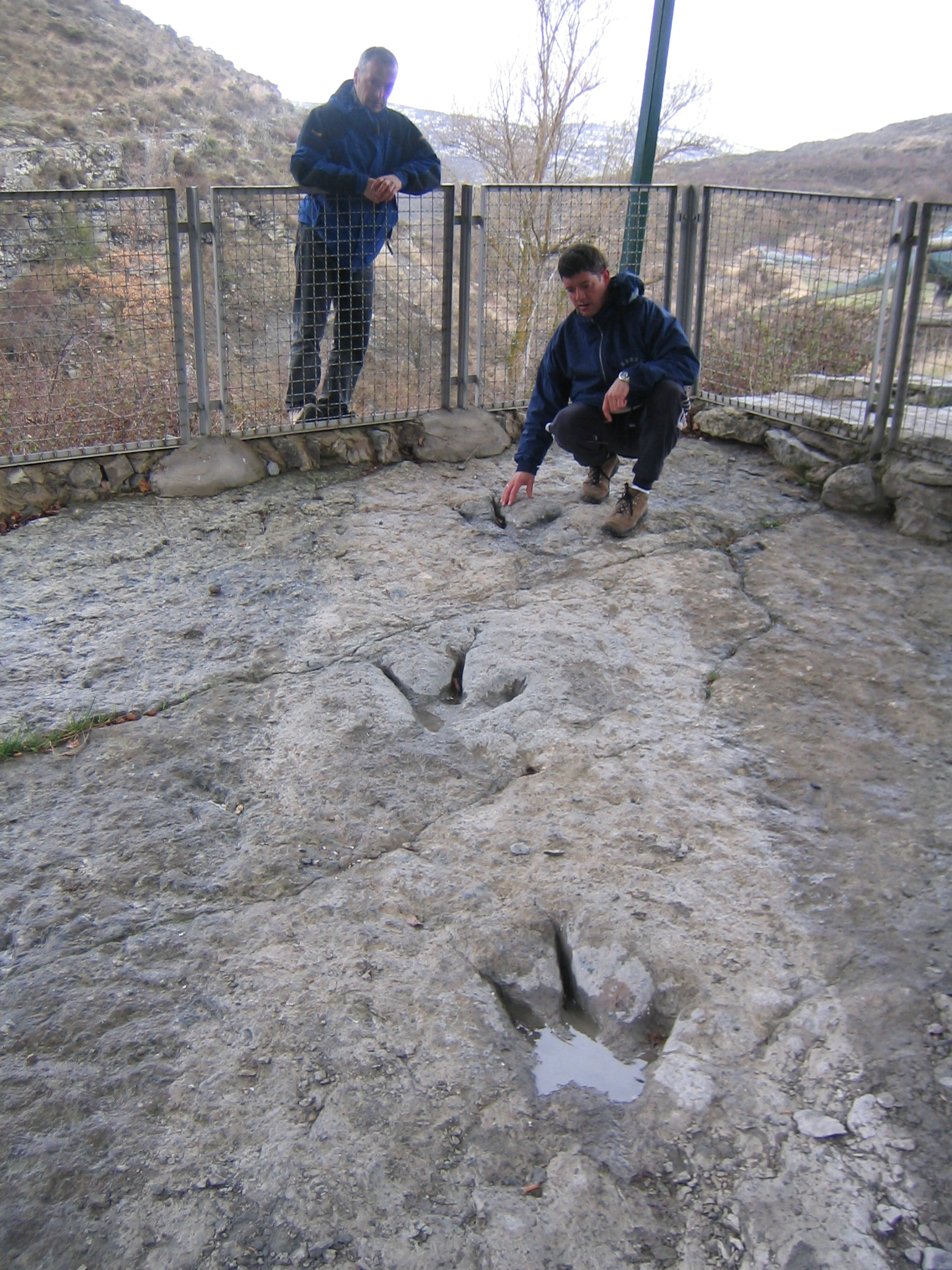
Dinosaur footprints in Enciso
