= Sergio Valdés (footballer) =

Chilean footballer (1933–2019)

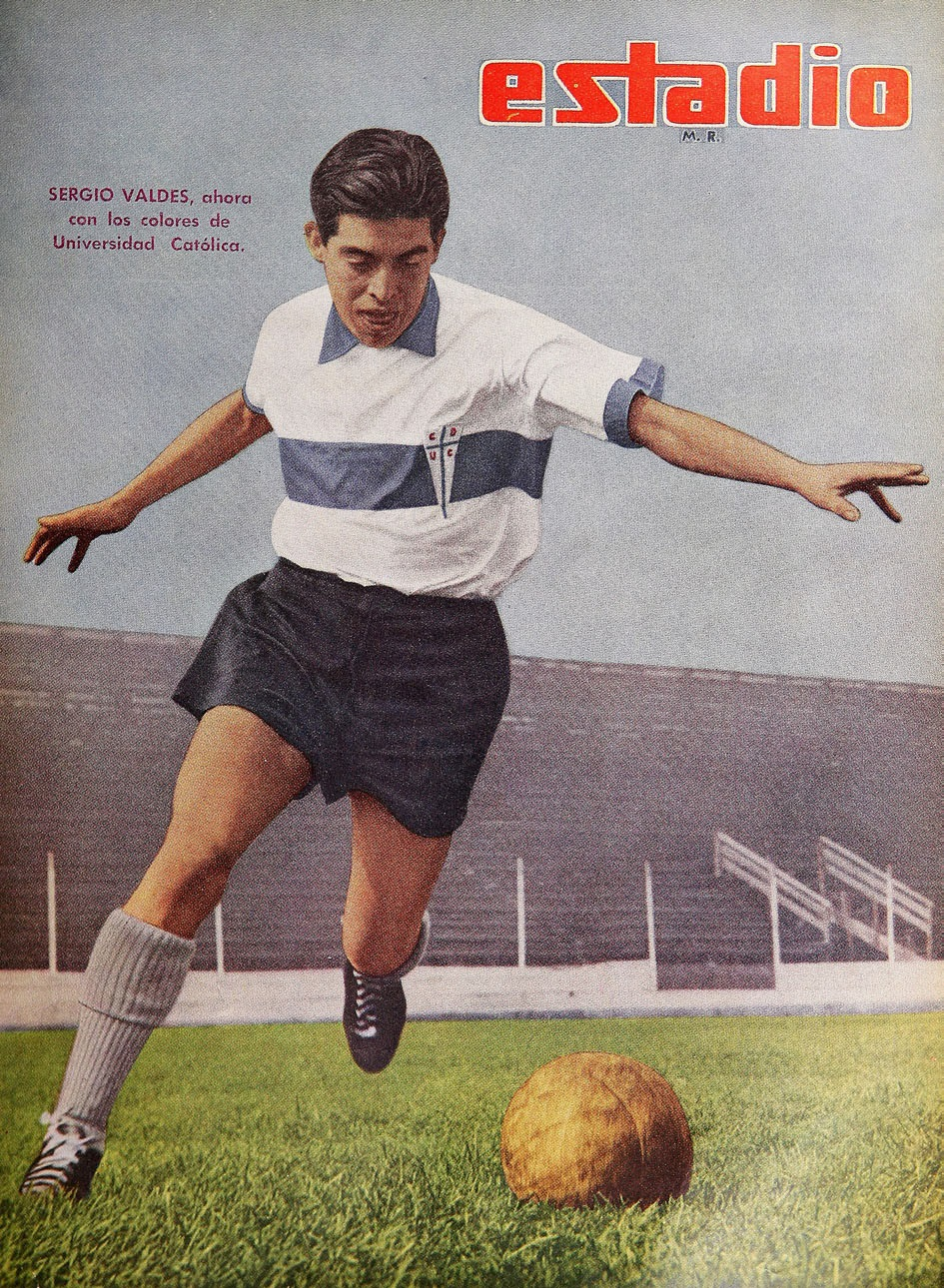

Personal information
- Full name: Sergio Valdés Silva
- Date of birth: 11 May 1933
- Place of birth: Santiago, Chile
- Date of death: 2 April 2019 (aged 85)
- Place of death: Algarrobo, Chile
- Position: Defender

Senior career*
Years	Team	Apps	(Gls)
1954–1959	Magallanes		
1960–1965	Universidad Católica		
1966	Ferrobádminton		

International career
1957–1961	Chile	21	(0)
Medal record
Men's football
Representing Chile
FIFA World Cup
Third place	1962 Chile
- * Club domestic league appearances and goals

Sergio Valdés Silva (11 May 1933 – 2 April 2019) was a Chilean football defender who played for Chile in the 1962 FIFA World Cup. He also played for Club Deportivo Universidad Católica.
