= Elena Aldunate =

Chilean journalist and writer

- Born: María Elena Aldunate Bezanilla; 1 March 1925
- Died: 2005 (aged 79–80)
- Occupation: Writer

María Elena Aldunate Bezanilla, who wrote under the name Elena Aldunate, (1 March 1925 – 2005) was a Chilean journalist and writer.

== Early life ==
The daughter of Arturo Aldunate Phillips, she was born in Santiago. She contributed to newspapers and magazines and also wrote scripts for radio and television. She published her first novel Candia in 1950 and published her first science fiction story "Juana y la cibernética" (Juana and Cybernetics) in 1963.

She helped found the Club Chileno de Ciencia Ficción (Chilean Science Fiction Club) and served as its vice-president.

Her writing features female main characters and shows the influence of Latin American feminism. Her science fiction writing was inspired by authors Jules Verne, H. G. Wells, Ray Bradbury, Arthur C Clarke, Isaac Asimov and Hugo Correa. Her later writing was targeted at younger readers.

== Selected works ==
- El señor de las mariposas (Lord of the Butterflies), story collection (1967)
- Del cosmos las quieren vírgenes (The Cosmos Wants Them Virginal), novel (1977)
- Angélica y el delfín (Angélica and the Dolphin), collection (1977). The title story received second prize in the "Nueva Dimensión" competition.
- Cuentos de Elena Aldunate: La dama de la ciencia ficción (Stories by Elena Aldunate: The Lady of Science Fiction), collection (2011)

== Suggested bibliography ==
- Arcaya Pizarro, Marcos (2023). Arcaya Pizarro, Marco (2023). "De extraterrestres, vírgenes y dictadura. "Del cosmos las quieren vírgenes" y la dimensión cultural de las palabras". Itinerarios. Revista de estudios lingüísticos, literarios, históricos y antropológicos (in Spanish) (38): 89–111. doi:10.7311/ITINERARIOS.38.2023.05.
- Arcaya Pizarro, Marcos. "Violencia y articulación sociohistórica. ´Juana y la cibernética` de Elena Aldunate y Vírgenes del Sol Inn Cabaret de Alexis Figueroa". En Violencia y discurso en el mundo hispánico: género, cotidianidad y poder. Padilla Libros Editores & Libreros, 2015. p. 217–232.
- Arcaya Pizarro, Marcos. "Cuando ´las figuras, perforadas, dejan ver el paisaje`. ´Juana y la cibernética` de Elena Aldunate y la memoria de los signos". En Itinerarios: revista de estudios lingüisticos, literarios, históricos y antropológicos, 2015, no 21, p. 221–232.
- Guijarro-Crouch, Mercedes. "Elena Aldunate" en Latin American Science Fiction Writers: An A-to-Z Guide (Westport, Connecticut: Greenwood Press, 2004), editado por Darrell B. Lockhart pp. 13–16.
- Loach, Bárbara. "María Elena Aldunate" en Escritoras chilenas, v. 3. (Santiago, Chile: Editorial Cuarto Propio, 2011), editado por Patricia Rubio. pp. 341–342.
