= Carlos Aldunate Lyon =

Chilean Jesuit priest

Father Carlos Aldunate Lyon S.J.
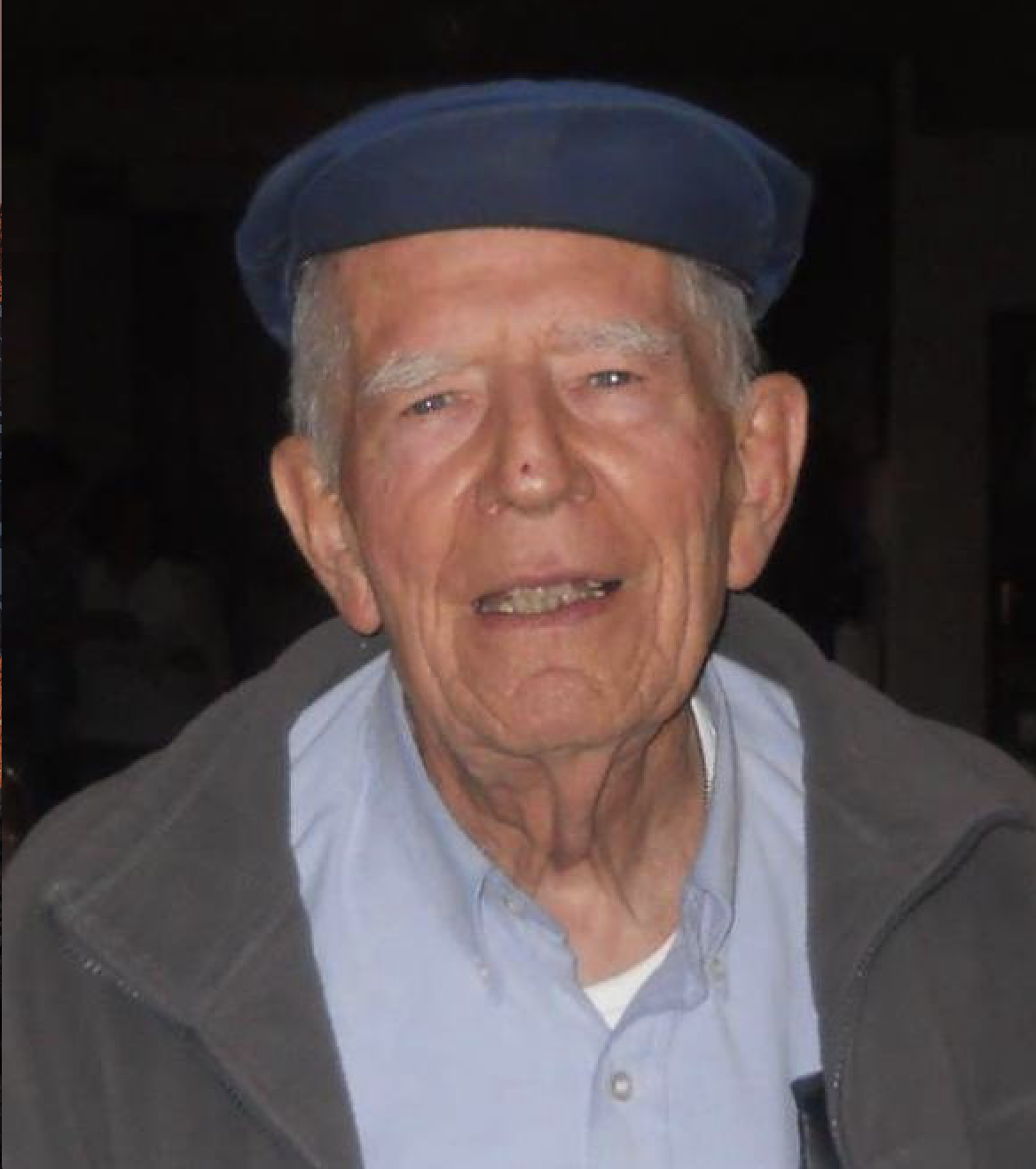
- Church: Roman Catholic Church

Orders
- Ordination: 23 December 1944

Personal details
- Born: Carlos Aldunate Lyon; 16 May 1916 Santiago, Chile
- Died: 18 July 2018 (aged 102) Valparaíso, Chile
- Denomination: Roman Catholicism
- Residence: Santiago, Chile
- Profession: Catholic priest
- Education: Catholic University of Leuven

Carlos Aldunate Lyon (16 May 1916 – 18 July 2018) was a Chilean Catholic Jesuit priest, teacher, writer, and promoter of the Catholic Charismatic Renewal in Chile, as well as one of the teachers of Pope Francis.

== Biography ==
He was the son of Carlos Aldunate Errázuriz and Adriana Lyon Lynch; he was the grandson of the president of the Chilean Conservative Party, Carlos Aldunate Solar, and brother of the Jesuit priest José Aldunate. He studied in Jesuit schools in England and Chile. He entered the Society of Jesus in the city of Chillán and was ordained a priest in Argentina in 1944. In 1948 he obtained a Ph.D. in philosophy from the Catholic University of Leuven in Belgium.

He was rector of the seminary of the Jesuits in Chile and the Jesuit colleges in Santiago, Antofagasta, and Osorno. He was rector of the Universidad del Norte between 1966 and 1969, and director of the Casa de Ejercicios Loyola. He also served as a professor at the Pontifical Catholic University of Chile, the Pontifical Catholic University of Valparaíso and the Universidad del Norte. He performed exorcisms, and since 1975 he was dedicated to giving retreats and spirituality courses in Chile and abroad.

In 1960, the young Jorge Mario Bergoglio (today Pope Francis), in his period of formation towards the priesthood, spent a season in Chile, where Aldunate was the master of novices.

He was the main initiator of the movement of the Charismatic Renewal in Chile, in the early 1970s.

He died on July 18, 2018, aged 102.

== Works ==
- Buscando salud.
- Camino de carismas.
- Carisma, fe y sanación.
- Carismas, ciencia y espíritus.
- Comiendo con Jesús.
- El camino de transformación espiritual y sicológica.
- El cristiano ante lo paranormal.
- El demonio, doctrina y práctica católica.
- El discernimiento.
- El Espíritu Santo nos guía, la iglesia católica.
- Encuentro con Dios.
- La oración carismática.
- Mi muerte: decisión de vida.
- Taller de biblia.
- Texto modernizado le los ejercicios espirituales de san Ignacio.
- Transformación espiritual y sicológica.
- Vivamos nuestra confirmación.
- Vivamos nuestra misa.
