= Mercedes Valdivieso =

Chilean writer

- Mercedes Valdivieso at Rice University
- Born: March 1, 1924; Santiago, Chile
- Died: August 3, 1993 (aged 69); Santiago, Chile
- Resting place: General Cemetery of Santiago, Chile
- Occupations: Author and feminist theorist
- Writing career
- Language: Spanish
- Period: 1961-1991
- Genre: Feminist literature
- Notable work: La Brecha (1961)
- Movement: Generation of '50
- Website: www.mercedesvaldivieso.net

Mercedes Valdivieso (born Isabel Mercedes Ignacia Valenzuela Álvarez; March 1, 1924 – August 3, 1993) was a Chilean writer, known since her earliest writings for the subversive nature of her texts. She was born in Santiago, Chile. She first wrote La Brecha (Breakthrough) in 1961, which is considered to be a landmark feminist Latin-American novel. This novel caused dismay from the reactionary segment of society and loud applause from the critics and is considered a revolutionary departure from the traditional treatment of the feminine role in marriage. Breakthrough is a novel that ends with the heroine's awareness that she didn't really need to depend upon a man in order to lead a fulfilling life. The book enjoyed an unexpected publishing success and went through five consecutive editions. Mercedes Valdivieso had the extreme audacity to become an innovator; she bridged the gap between romantic and domestic fiction in a society where women have been viewed as a sexless gender, icons of virtue, and depending on men to meet the necessities of life. Valdivieso also was founder and director of Adan, a men's magazine, and Breakthrough, a feminist publication, she published articles in newspapers and magazines and she gave many lectures and speeches. She taught literature at the University of Peking, at the University of Houston, at Stephen F. Austin State University in Nacogdoches, at University of St. Thomas in Houston and she was a Professor Emeritus at Rice University.

== Books ==
- La Brecha, novel, Zig Zag Publishing Company, Santiago de Chile, 1961, 5 editions, 160 pages.
- Babel, a story in Antologia del Cuento Realista Chileno, by moretic y Orellana, Austral (publishers), Santiago de Chile, 1962
- La Tierra que les Dí, novel, Zig Zag, Santiago de Chile, 1963, 2 editions. Translated into Polish, Dziesiec Palcow, Czytelnik, 1968.
- Los Ojos de Bambú, novel, Zig Zag, Santiago de Chile, 1964, 250 pages.
- Las Noches y un Dia, novel, Seix Barral, Barcelona, 1971, 257 pages.
- Breakthrough, translated by Graciela S. Daichman, 1988.
- Maldita yo entre las Mujeres, historic novel, Planeta, Santiago de Chile, 1991.

== Selected articles ==
- Ruptura y Tradicion, interview with Octavio Paz, Ercilla, Santiago de Chile, January 1970.
- Del Tlatoani al Caudillo, extensive reproduction of an interview with Octavio Paz, in Literary Supplement of Siempre, Mexico, April 1970.
- Two Literary Approaches to the Problem of Existence: El Extranjero by A.Camus and El Tunel by E.Sabato, Spanish-Brazilian Publication, University of Houston, 1970.
- Gabriela Mistral: Fundadora de una Tradicion, El Sol de Mexico, Literary Supplement, Mexico, January, 1976.
- World Hope in Sisterhood, Breakthrough (newspaper), Houston, January, 1976.
- La Octava Cara del Dado, El Sol de Mexico, Literary Supplement, Mexico, January 1976.
- Imagenes de una era Contradictoria, El Sol de Mexico, Literary Supplement, Mexico, March 1976.
- Congreso Interamericano de Mujeres Escritoras, El Sol de Mexico, Newspaper, May 1976.
