= Juan Carlos Silva (politician) =

Chilean lawyer, politician and militant

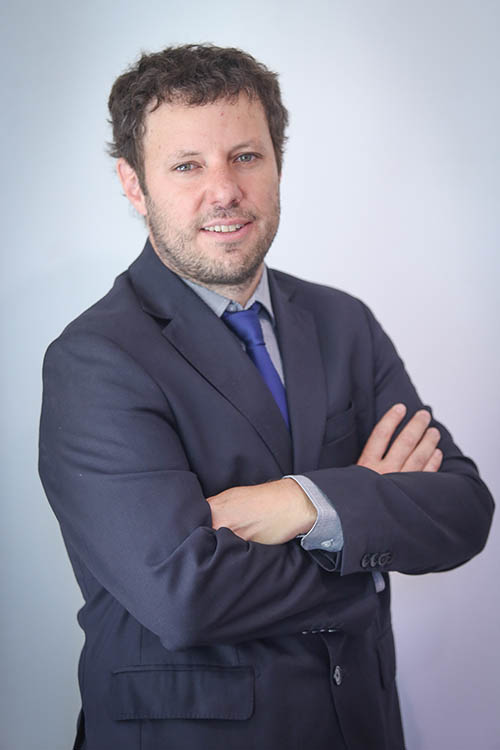
- Official portrait (2018)

Undersecretary of Culture and Arts
- In office 11 March 2018 – 11 March 2022
- President: Sebastián Piñera
- Preceded by: Office established
- Succeeded by: Andrea Gutiérrez

Personal details
- Born: Juan Carlos Silva Aldunate; 24 September 1976 (age 50) Santiago, Chile
- Party: Evópoli
- Spouse: Maite Zubizarreta
- Education: Pontifical Catholic University of Chile (LL.B); New York University (MA); University of California, Berkeley (LL.M)
- Occupation: Politician
- Profession: Lawyer

Juan Carlos Silva Aldunate (born 24 September 1976) is a Chilean lawyer and politician, militant from Political Evolution.

== Biography ==
=== Early life ===
Silva Aldunate graduated as a lawyer from the Pontifical Catholic University of Chile (PUC) in 2002. Then, he obtained a certificate in art administration from the New York University (NYU) in 2007, and a MA in law and a technology law certificate from the University of California, Berkeley (2009−2010).

Silva also has a bachelor's degree in social sciences and humanities from the PUC (1995−1996). From 2002 to 2003, he did a degree in aesthetics in the same university.

=== Political career ===
He worked as an associate attorney at the Otero Law Firm (2002−2009) and was a founding partner of the Salón Tudor Cultural Space (2007−2011). Similarly, Silva Aldunate was a professor of communication law at the PUC from 2010 to 2012. Later, he was a legislative coordinator of the National Council of Culture and the Arts (CNCA, 2010−2014).

Since 2014, he is a partner of the cultural affairs agency Territorio Cultura. He has also developed his activity in the professional football industry, serving as vice president of Deportes Iquique, director of the Chilean Football Federation (FFCh) and the Asociación Nacional de Fútbol Profesional (ANFP).

On 11 March 2018, he was appointed by President Sebastián Piñera as Undersecretary of Arts and Cultures, being thus the first in charge of the newly created Ministry.
