= 2004 Futrono mudflows =

Mudflows in southern Chile in 2004

Coordinates: 40.1423°S 72.2542°W

On August 28, 2004, following heavy rainfall, mudflows overran several houses in near Futrono, southern Chile. Chile Route T-55 between Futrono and Llifén was cut off by the landslide. At least three separate mudflows occurred in the event.

Three people were injured by the mudflows and about five thousand became temporarily isolated as roads were blocked.

== See also ==
- 2002 Northern Chile floods and mudflow
- 2017 Villa Santa Lucía mudflow
