= 2017 Villa Santa Lucía mudflow =

Natural disaster in Chile

Coordinates: 43.411°S 72.369°W

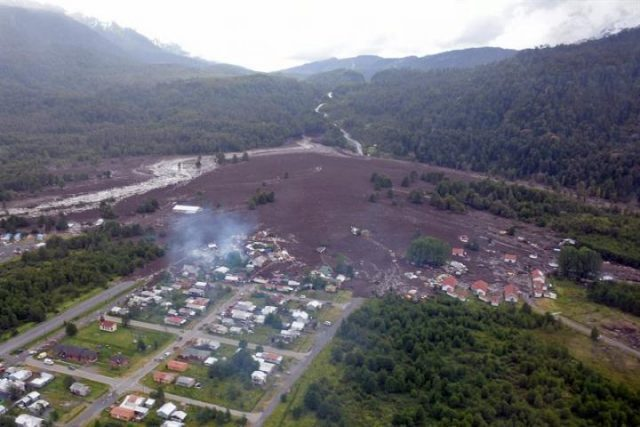
View of Chaitén from above

The Villa Santa Lucía mudflow was a natural disaster in Chaitén commune, southern Chile, that occurred on the morning of December 16, 2017, in the namesake locality, located in the commune of Chaitén, Los Lagos Region. The mudflow caused the death of 21 persons and the disappearance of one.

== See also ==
- 2004 Futrono mudflows
- 2015 Northern Chile floods and mudflow
