= 1991 Antofagasta mudflows =

Natural disaster in Chile

Coordinates: 23°40′34.02″S 70°24′10.35″W

The 1991 Antofagasta mudflow was a natural disaster in the city of Antofagasta, northern Chile, that occurred on the morning of June 18, 1991. The mudflow was triggered by an unusual rainfall of 42 mm during the night. Mudflows also affected the port of Taltal 180 km south of Antofagasta. 91 persons are confirmed to have died in the disaster and the whereabouts of an additional 19 have never been clarified. About 700 houses were either destroyed or damaged beyond repairs. In Antofagasta the mudflows from the quebradas of La Cadena, Salar del Carmen, Baquedano and El Ancla were the most destructive. Other quebradas were less destructive mudflows developed were Huáscar, Jardines del Sur, Universidad de Antofagasta, Las Vertientes, Caliche, El Toro, Uribe, Riquelme, Farellones, Bonilla Norte, Bonilla Sur, Club Hípico and La Chimba.

Bus connection to and from Antofagasta to the south was severed as a number of lines suspended operations and police diverted transit to the city.

== See also ==
- 2002 Northern Chile floods and mudflow
- 2015 Northern Chile floods and mudflow
