= Antofagasta =

City and commune in northern Chile

- City and commune
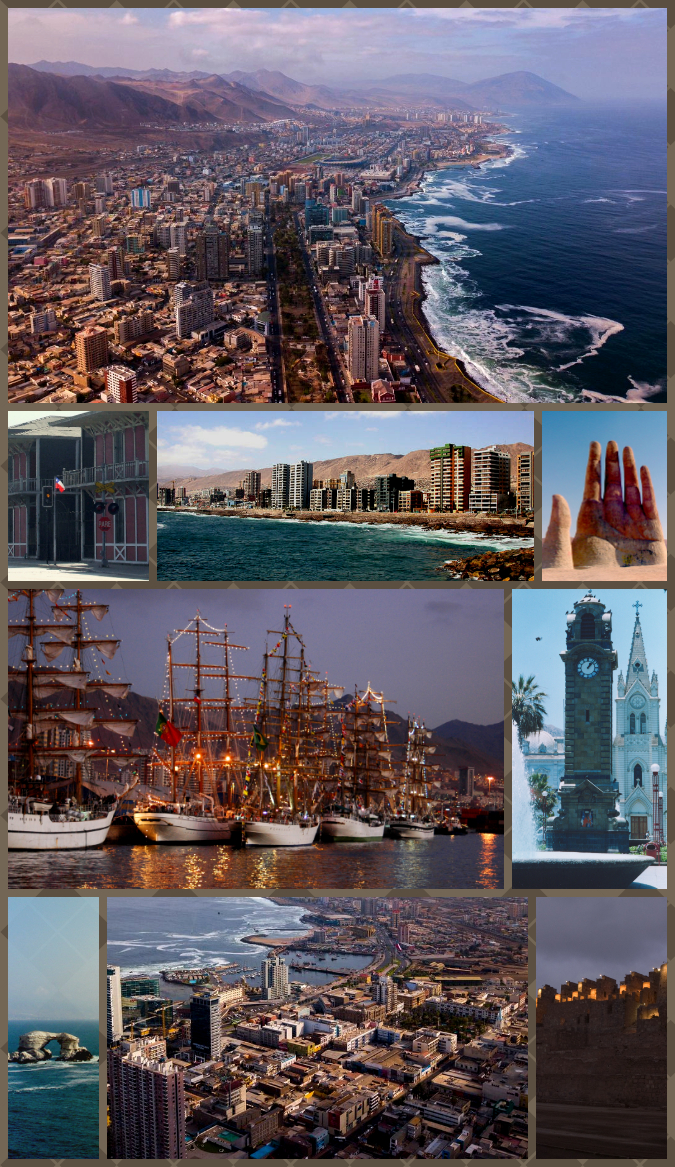
- Top row: View of downtown Antofagasta; 2nd row: Old Antofagasta Customs House building, Beach of Antofagasta, "Mano del Desierto" (Hand of the Desert) Sand Sculpture in Atacama Desert; 3rd row: Sailboats, Plaza Colón clocktower Bottom row: La Portada Natural Monument, Panorama of North Antofagasta, Ruins of Huanchaca.

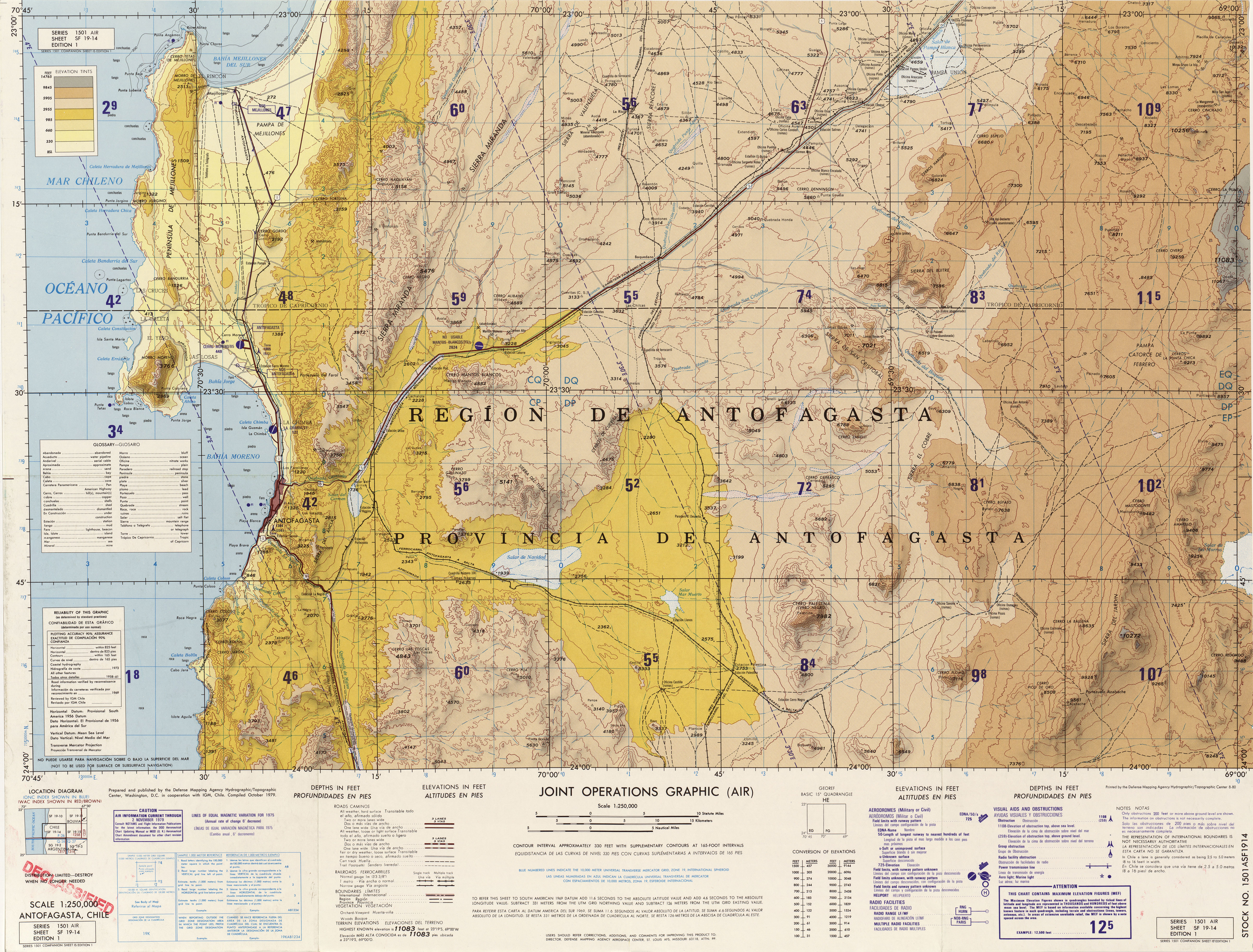
- Coat of arms Map of Antofagasta's farms Location in Chile
- Nickname: La perla del Norte ("Pearl of the North")
- Motto: "Gloria, patria y tesón es tu lema y tu honor" ("Glory, homeland and tenacity is your motto and your honor")
- Coordinates: 23°39′S 70°24′W
- Country: Chile
- Region: Antofagasta
- Province: Antofagasta
- Settled: 22 October 1868
- Founder: José Santos Ossa

Government
  - Type: Municipal council
  - Mayor: Sacha Razmilic (EVO)

Area
  - Commune: 30,718.1 km^{2} (11,860.3 sq mi)
- Elevation: 40 m (130 ft)

Population (2024)
  - Commune: 401,096
  - Rank: 5th
  - Density: 13.0573/km^{2} (33.8183/sq mi)
  - Urban: 398,158
  - Rural: 2,938
- Demonym(s): Antofagastino, -na (Spanish)

GDP (PPP, constant 2015 values)
  - Year: 2023
  - Total (Metro): $12.8 billion
  - Per capita: $28,100
- Time zone: UTC−4 (CLT)
  - Summer (DST): UTC−3 (CLST)
- Postal code: 3580000
- Area code: +56 55
- Climate: BWk
- Website: Municipality of Antofagasta

Antofagasta (Spanish pronunciation: [antofaˈɣasta]) is a port city in northern Chile, about 1,100 kilometres (700 mi) north of Santiago. It is the capital of Antofagasta Province and Antofagasta Region. As of the 2024 census, with a population of 401,096, it is the 5th-largest city in Chile.

Once claimed by Bolivia following the Spanish American wars of independence, Antofagasta was captured by Chile on 14 February 1879, triggering the War of the Pacific (1879–83). Chilean sovereignty was officially recognised by Bolivia under the terms of the 1904 Treaty of Peace and Friendship.

The city of Antofagasta is closely linked to mining activity, being a port and the chief service hub for one of Chile's major mining areas. While silver and saltpeter mining have been historically important for Antofagasta, since the mid-19th century copper mining is by far the most important mining activity for Antofagasta, fueling a steady growth in the areas of construction, retail, hotel accommodations, population growth and skyline development until the end of the 2000s commodities boom in 2013. Since the 2010s Antofagasta is also a service hub for lithium mining.

Antofagasta is the seat of one of Chile's three environmental courts and is also a university city being the home of the Catholic University of the North and the University of Antofagasta.

In 2012, Antofagasta has the highest GDP per capita of Chile, US$37,000 and the 3rd place for Human Development Index just after Metropolitana de Santiago Region and Magallanes and Antártica Chilena Region.

== Etymology ==
The name of Antofagasta is "presumably" derived from the name of Antofagasta de la Sierra in Catamarca Province, Argentina.

== History ==
=== Early settlers ===
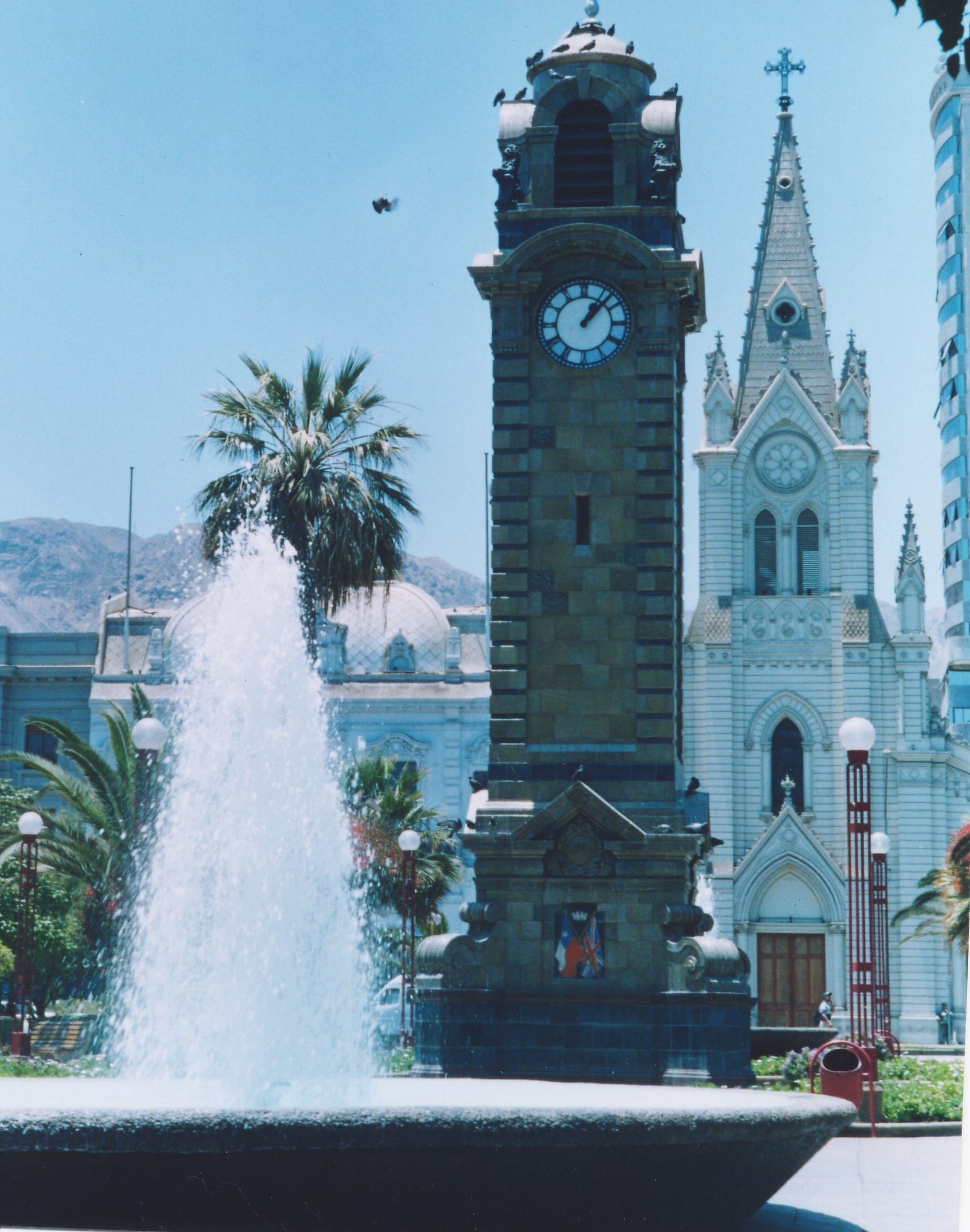
In Chile, Antofagasta is known as "The Pearl of the North".

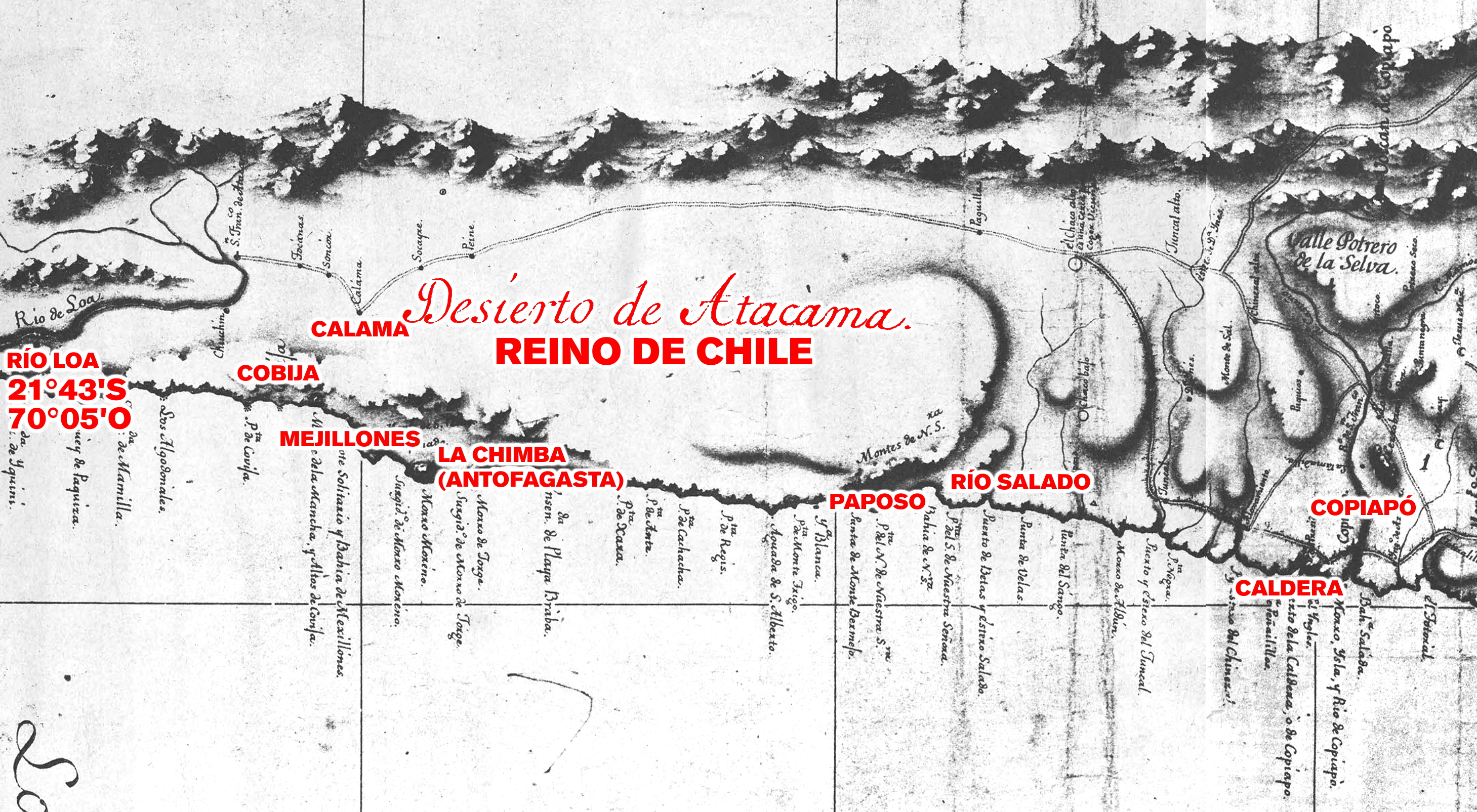
1793 Andrés Baleato's map showing the internal border of Chile and Peru in the Loa River during the Spanish Empire

The Atacama border dispute between Bolivia and Chile (1825–1879)

The territory of Antofagasta was included in maps of the Captaincy General of Chile in the 18th century, depending from the city of Copiapó.

The territory was disputed between Chile and Bolivia until the signing of the Boundary Treaty of 1866.

On 18 September 1866, José Santos Ossa and Francisco Puelma achieved the award of the concession of nitrate lands, following a request taken to the Bolivian government. The exploring of the Chilean miners found rich deposits of saltpeter (nitratine) in the field of Salar del Carmen, to the east of the present Antofagasta. Agreed to form the "Sociedad Exploradora del Desierto de Atacama" (Explorer Society of Atacama Desert). After the formation of the company, began to fill with what was called "La Chimba".

On 8 May 1872, Antofagasta was designated by the Bolivian Government as Puerto Mayor, opening trade worldwide.

On 27 November 1873, the "Compañía de Salitres y Ferrocarril de Antofagasta" (CSFA), a Chilean mining company, signed a contract with the government of Bolivia, in which taxes were removed from mineral exploitation for 15 years. This contract was not ratified by the Congress of Bolivia, which was then analyzed negotiations with Chile.

=== War of the Pacific ===
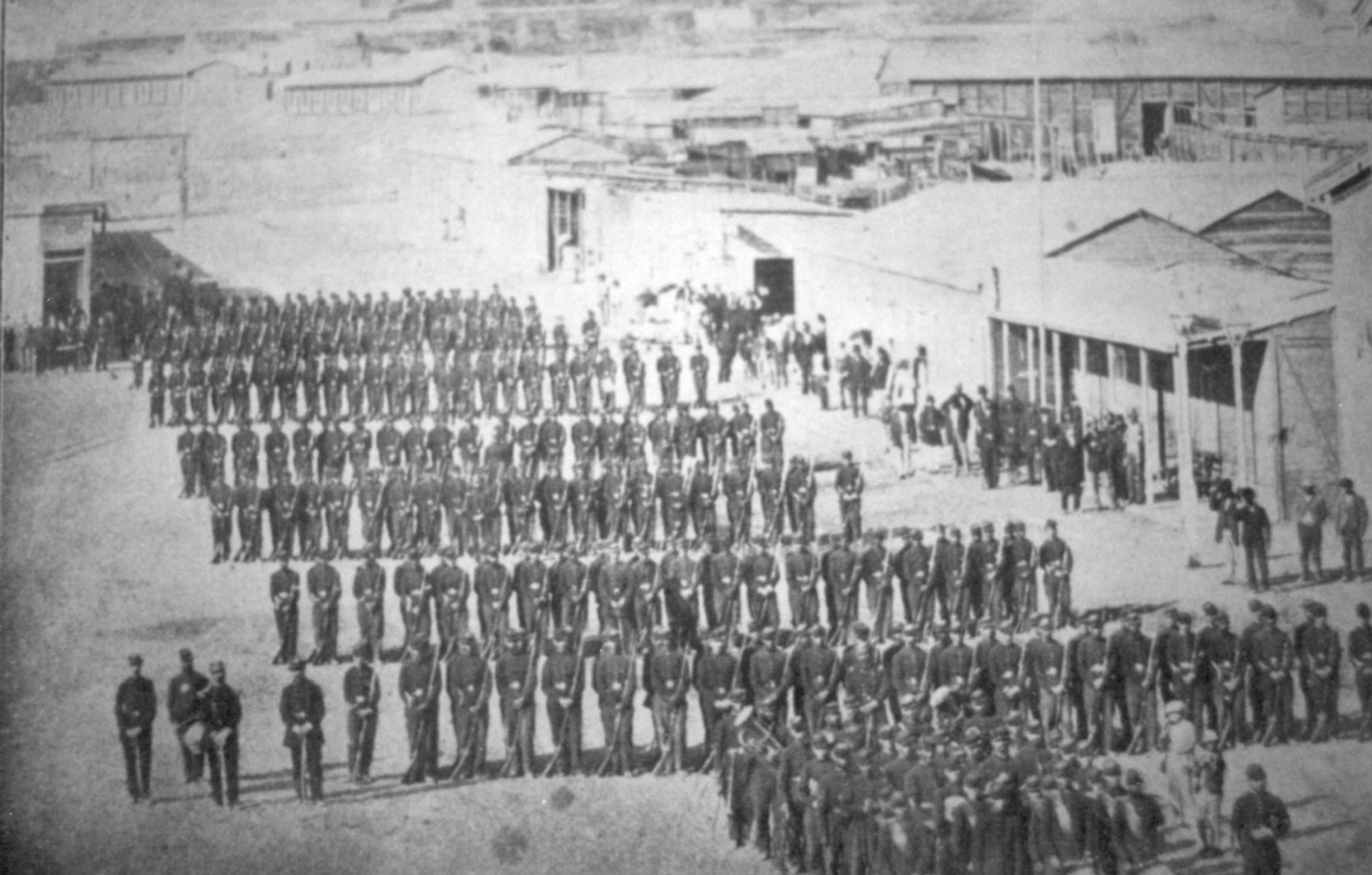
Battalion No. 3 Line of the Chilean Army, formed in columns in the Plaza Colón of Antofagasta in 1879

In 1873, Bolivia signed a secret treaty of defensive alliance with Peru. This would be used as an argument 5 years later in Chile, when it unleashed the War of the Pacific. The secret alliance forbade Bolivia from signing a border treaty with Chile, without consulting with Peru. However, in 1874 Chile and Bolivia signed a border treaty, which replaced the previous treaty of 1866. One of its points was not to impose new taxes on individuals, industries and Chilean capital for 25 years.

For Bolivia, the contract of 1873 between the government and CSFA was not yet in force, because, according to the Bolivian constitution, all contracts with the Bolivian government had to be approved by the congress.

According to the Bolivian version of events, the contract with the saltpeter company was incomplete so the congress, to approve the contract, decided to enforce a tax of 10 cents, which did not violate the treaty of 1874, since the contract was not yet in force at that date. Bolivia suspended the tax in deference to the government of Chile, but following a note from the Chilean foreign minister, it reactivated the tax law, then cancelled and closed the "Compañía de Salitres". Faced with a looming conflict with Chile, Bolivia decided to claim support under the agreement signed with Peru, and the treaty became effective with the Chilean occupation of Antofagasta, on 14 February 1879.

=== 20th century ===
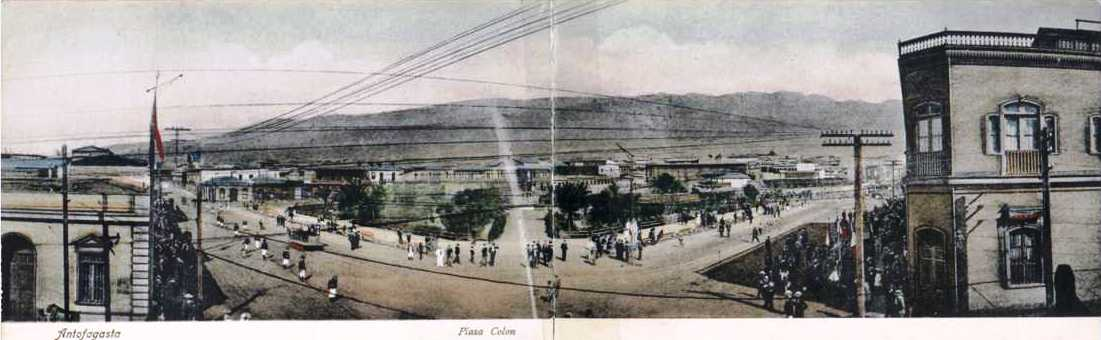
The Plaza Colón at the beginning of the 20th century

The Treaty of Peace and Friendship between Chile and Bolivia, signed on 20 October 1904, and promulgated on 21 March 1905, established in perpetuity border between Chile and Bolivia.

In 1912, the British community (La Colonia Britanica) erected a clock tower, replicating Big Ben, in Plaza Colón to celebrate the republic's centenary.

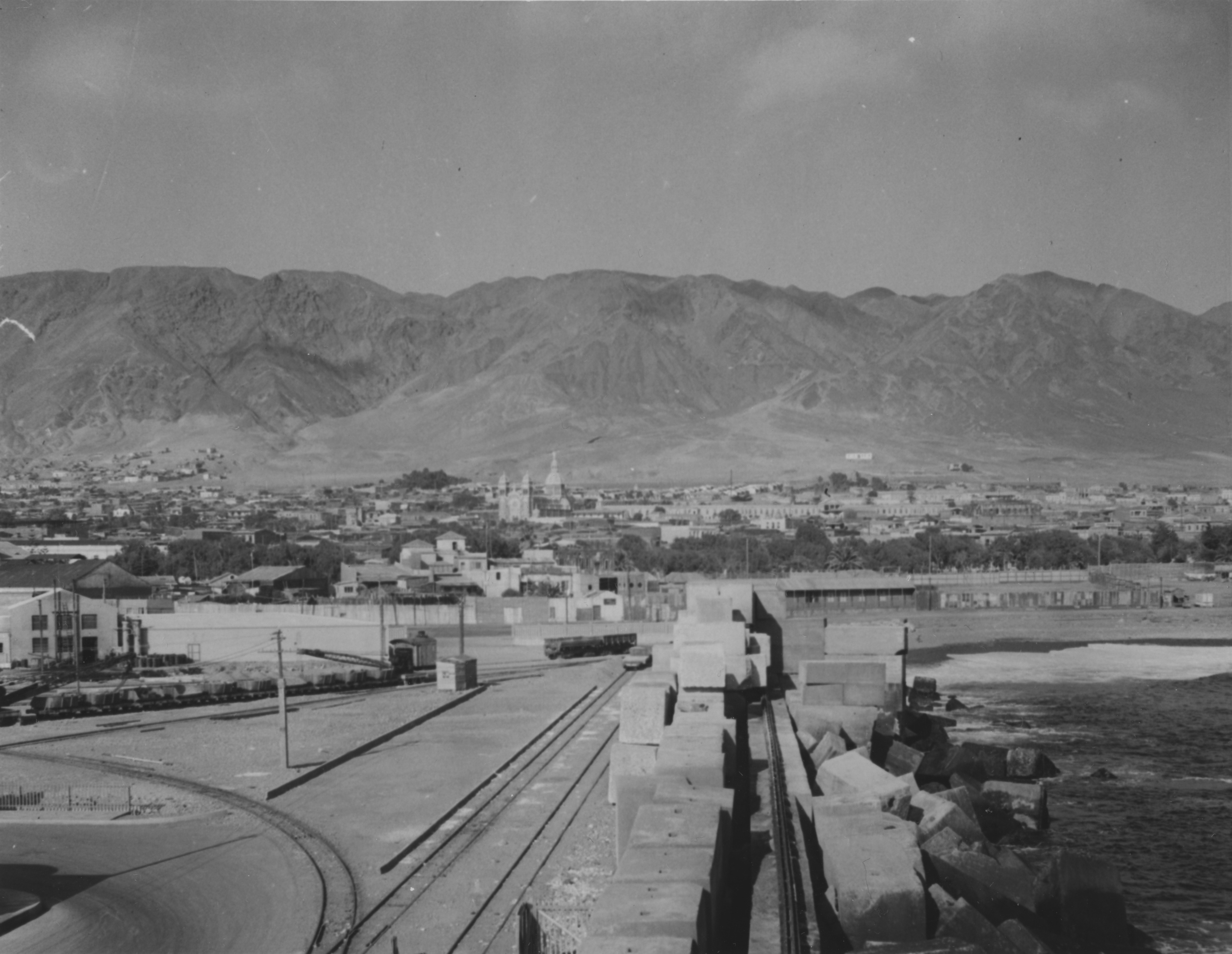
Antofagasta in June 1941

In 1956, the Universidad del Norte (now the Catholic University of the North) was founded, due to support from the Catholic University of Valparaíso. On 9 October, of the same year began the negotiations for the creation of the "Centro Universitario Zona Norte" (University Center North Zone), part of the University of Chile.

On 18 June 1991, a mudslide devastated much of the city, undermining land, damaged 2,464 houses and destroyed 493 buildings. Material damage was estimated at $70,000,000. The disaster left 92 dead, 16 missing and about 20,000 homeless. On 30 July 1995, the city was hit by an earthquake measuring 7.3 on the Richter Scale, with an intensity VII to VIII on the Mercalli Scale.

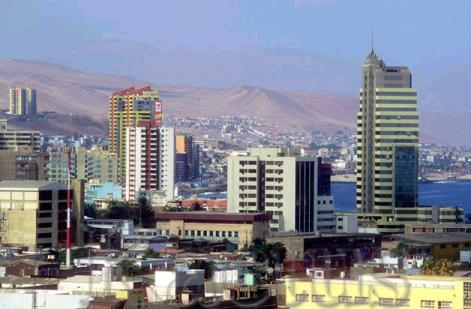
View of the south of Antofagasta in 2005

=== 2000–present ===
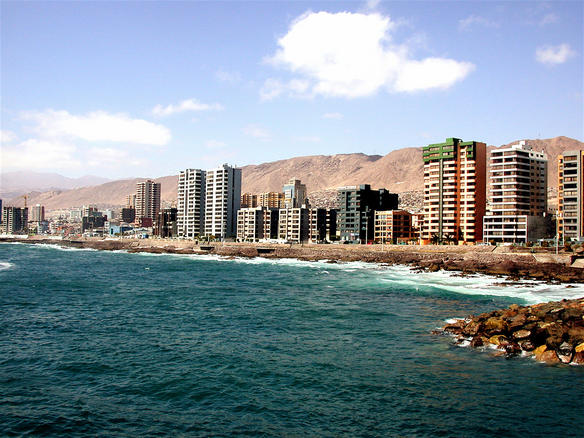
Antofagasta

In the municipal elections of 2008, the first female mayor of the city, Dra. Marcela Hernando, was elected, who retired from her political party to run as an independent.

== Geography ==
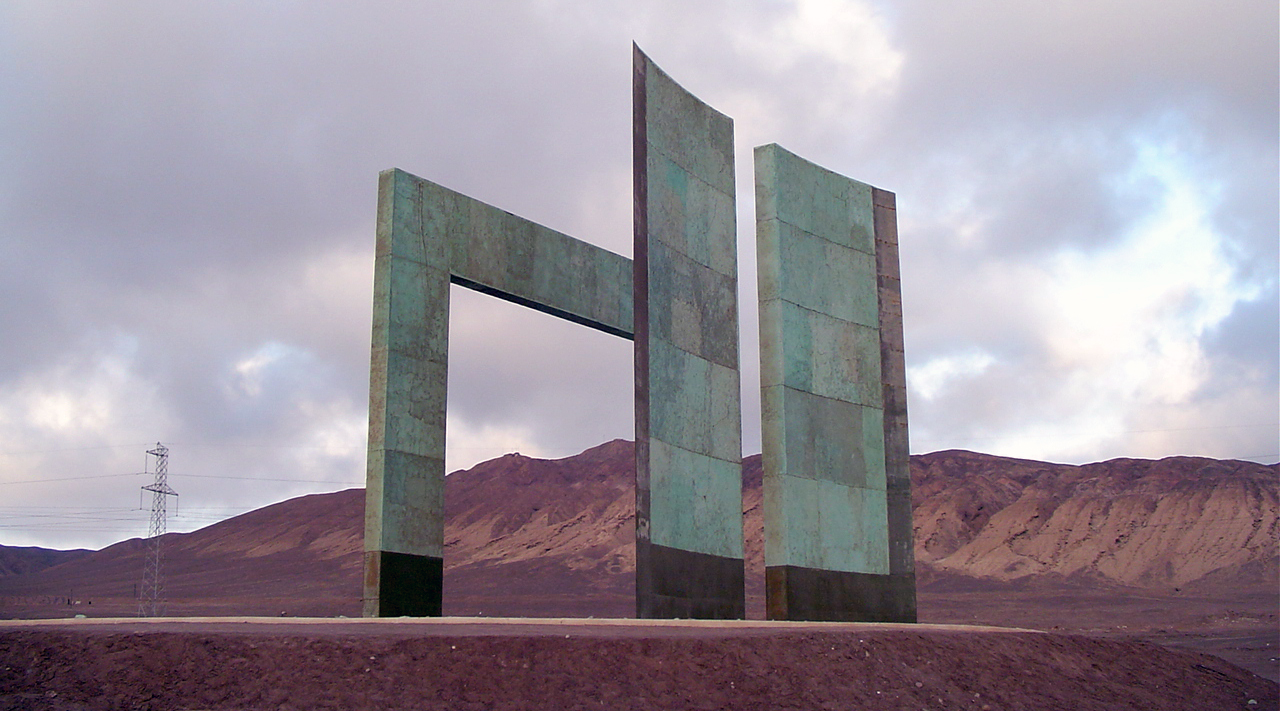
Tropic of Capricorn Monument

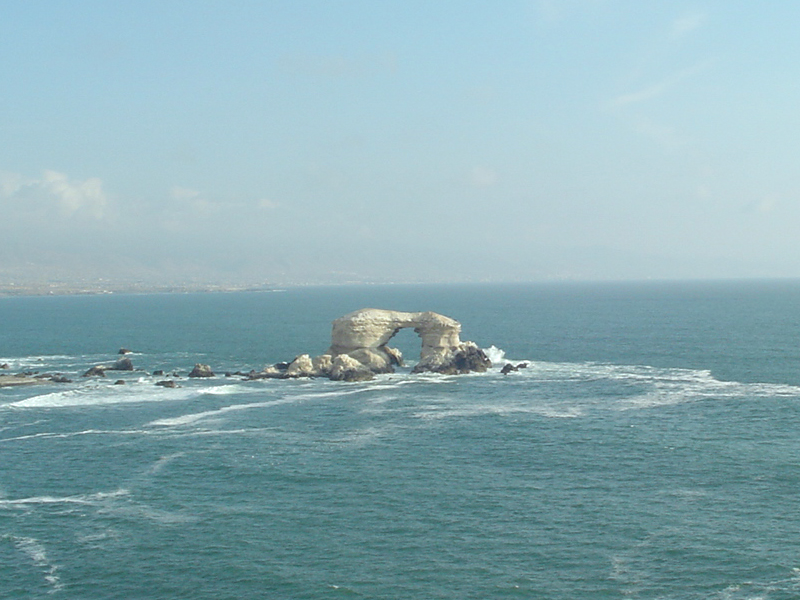
Natural Monument La Portada

The city has an average elevation of 40 m (131 ft). With an area of 30,718.1 30,718.1 square kilometres (11,860.3 sq mi), it is the 3rd-largest commune in Chile.

The urban area of Antofagasta begins abruptly, breaking the monotony of the desert and is located in the coastal plains, south of Mejillones Peninsula and north of "Cerro Coloso". The Tropic of Capricorn passes in the north of the city, outside the urban area, which is located the Cerro Moreno International Airport. The Tropic of Capricorn Monument was opened on 21 December 2000 in celebration of this. Designed by the architect Eleonora Roman, it was created to point the Tropic of Capricorn and to work as a Solar Calendar.

Antofagasta was declared a partial common in the border area 20 July 1999, by Supreme Decree No. 1166 of the Ministry of Foreign Affairs.

The city has little vegetation because it is situated in the Atacama Desert, which is the world's driest nonpolar desert. However, among the vegetated areas are a series of urban wetlands. Native reptiles, arthropods, birds like the Calidris and mammals like the culpeo fox, inhabit or visit the wetlands. Some of these wetlands are threatened by garbage, street dogs, extraction of water, establishments of shacks (Spanish: ruco) and the diversion of water courses. As of January 2024 the municipality of Antofagasta plans to declare the wetlands official urban wetlands in accordance with the Urban Wetlands Law.

=== Climate ===
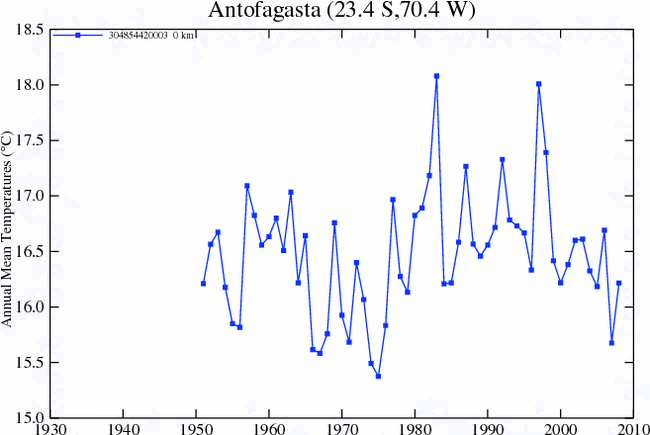
Average air temperatures in Antofagasta, 1951 to 2008, by (NASA)

The town of Antofagasta has a cold desert climate (Köppen BWk) with abundant sunshine and strong maritime influence.

The marked aridity and water scarcity are regulated by the Humboldt Current, in addition to the high humidity and morning fog known as "Camanchaca".

Furthermore, the Pacific anticyclone generates winds from the south and southwest.

The average annual temperature is 16.8 °C (62.2 °F). The average daily low temperature in the warmest month, January, is 17.5 °C (63.5 °F) while the average daily high temperature is 23.2 °C (73.8 °F). The coldest month, July, sees an average low temperature of 11.8 °C (53.2 °F) and an average high temperature of 16.5 °C (61.7 °F). The highest temperature recorded is 30.0 °C (86.0 °F) in January 1998 and the lowest recorded is 3.0 °C (37.4 °F) in September 1978.

The Atacama Desert coast is subject to a climate of extreme aridity, and therefore generates a low average annual rainfall of 3.4 mm (0.13 in) (1970–2000), and the Town of Antofagasta itself receives an annual average of less than 0.1 mm (0.004 in) of rainfall per year, earning it the record as the world's driest town. However, the sporadic occurrence of heavy rainfall, together with the geomorphologic situation of the city, make it susceptible to be affected by mud flows and landslides. Between 1916 and 1999, the city was affected by floods or landslides on seven occasions: 1925, 1930, twice in 1940, 1982, 1987 and 1991, of which the most important episodes in 1940 and 1991.

Climate data for Antofagasta (1991–2020, extremes 1950–present)
| Month | Jan | Feb | Mar | Apr | May | Jun | Jul | Aug | Sep | Oct | Nov | Dec | Year |
|---|---|---|---|---|---|---|---|---|---|---|---|---|---|
| Record high °C (°F) | 31.8 (89.2) | 30.5 (86.9) | 30.6 (87.1) | 28.8 (83.8) | 28.6 (83.5) | 23.8 (74.8) | 24.0 (75.2) | 27.0 (80.6) | 25.5 (77.9) | 27.4 (81.3) | 26.0 (78.8) | 29.8 (85.6) | 31.8 (89.2) |
| Mean daily maximum °C (°F) | 23.6 (74.5) | 23.6 (74.5) | 22.6 (72.7) | 20.5 (68.9) | 18.8 (65.8) | 17.3 (63.1) | 16.5 (61.7) | 16.8 (62.2) | 17.4 (63.3) | 18.5 (65.3) | 20.1 (68.2) | 21.8 (71.2) | 19.8 (67.6) |
| Daily mean °C (°F) | 20.2 (68.4) | 20.2 (68.4) | 19.1 (66.4) | 17.3 (63.1) | 15.7 (60.3) | 14.5 (58.1) | 13.8 (56.8) | 14.0 (57.2) | 14.6 (58.3) | 15.6 (60.1) | 17.1 (62.8) | 18.7 (65.7) | 16.7 (62.1) |
| Mean daily minimum °C (°F) | 17.4 (63.3) | 17.2 (63.0) | 16.2 (61.2) | 14.6 (58.3) | 13.3 (55.9) | 12.3 (54.1) | 11.7 (53.1) | 12.2 (54.0) | 12.9 (55.2) | 13.9 (57.0) | 15.1 (59.2) | 16.2 (61.2) | 14.4 (57.9) |
| Record low °C (°F) | 10.2 (50.4) | 8.3 (46.9) | 9.0 (48.2) | 0.0 (32.0) | 5.3 (41.5) | 6.0 (42.8) | 5.8 (42.4) | 3.6 (38.5) | 6.5 (43.7) | 7.0 (44.6) | 9.2 (48.6) | 7.5 (45.5) | 0.0 (32.0) |
| Average precipitation mm (inches) | 0.0 (0.0) | 0.0 (0.0) | 0.8 (0.03) | 0.1 (0.00) | 0.2 (0.01) | 1.5 (0.06) | 0.4 (0.02) | 0.8 (0.03) | 0.2 (0.01) | 0.2 (0.01) | 0.1 (0.00) | 0.1 (0.00) | 4.4 (0.17) |
| Average precipitation days (≥ 1.0 mm) | 0.0 | 0.0 | 0.0 | 0.0 | 0.1 | 0.2 | 0.1 | 0.2 | 0.1 | 0.1 | 0.0 | 0.0 | 1.0 |
| Average relative humidity (%) | 74 | 75 | 77 | 77 | 76 | 76 | 75 | 75 | 74 | 74 | 73 | 73 | 75 |
| Mean monthly sunshine hours | 312 | 294 | 289 | 249 | 228 | 200 | 207 | 210 | 220 | 250 | 270 | 303 | 3,032 |
Source 1: Dirección Meteorológica de Chile
Source 2: NOAA (precipitation days 1991–2020) Ogimet (sun 1981–2010)

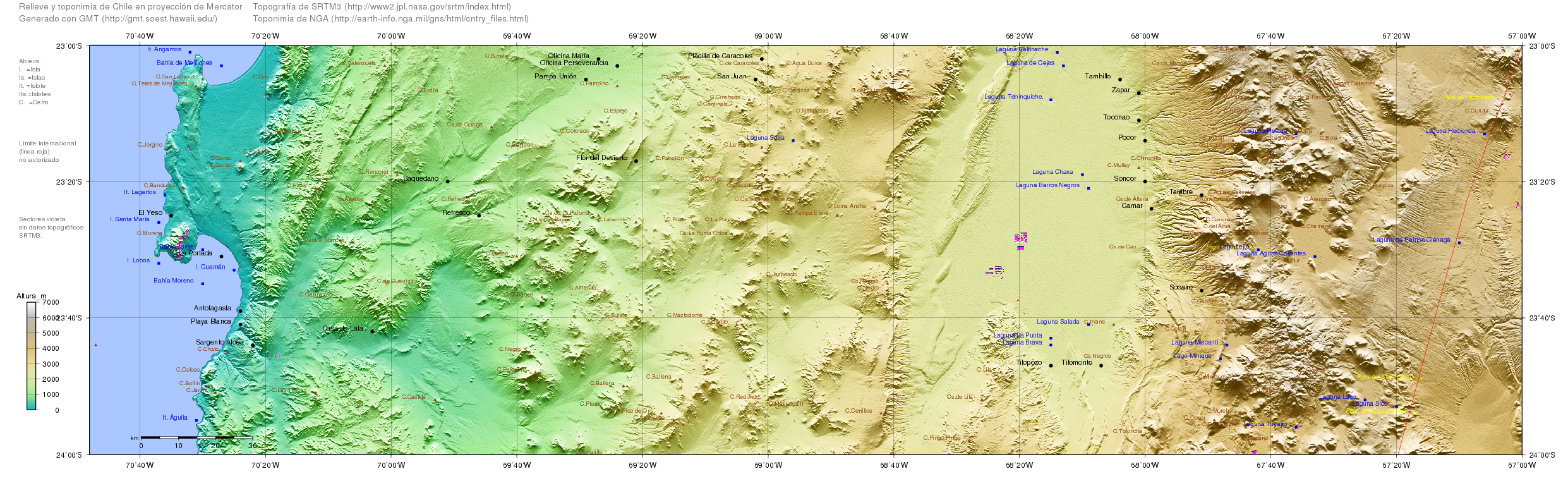
Topographic relief around Antofagasta

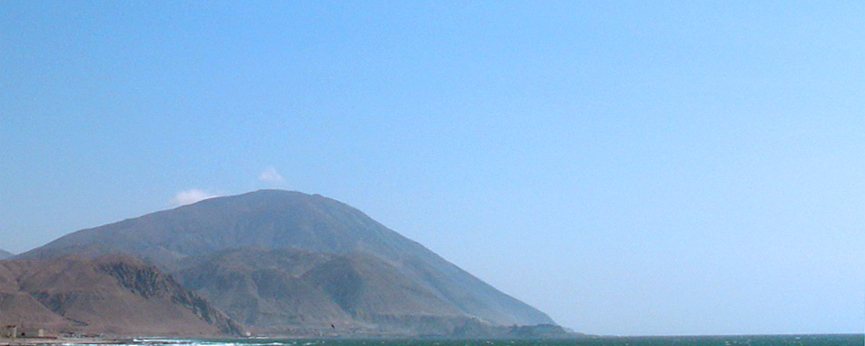
Cerro Coloso

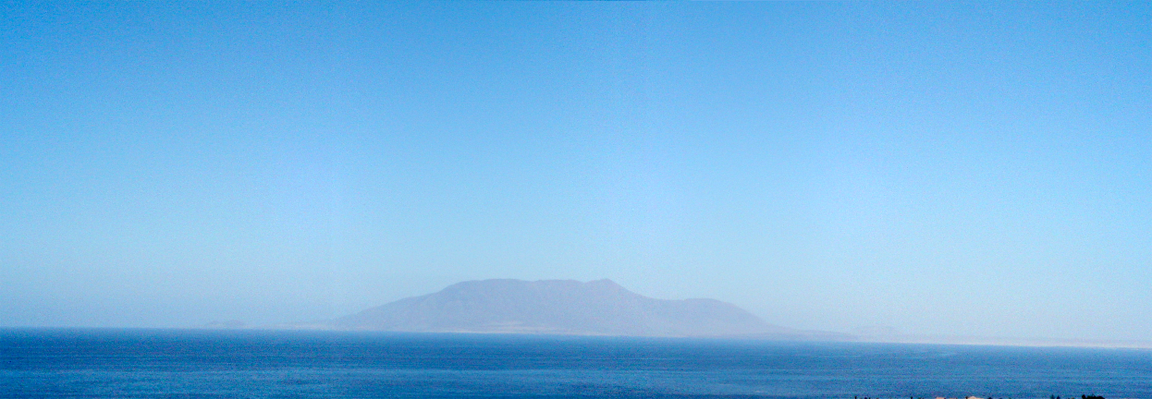
Cerro Moreno and Bahía Moreno

=== Hydrology ===
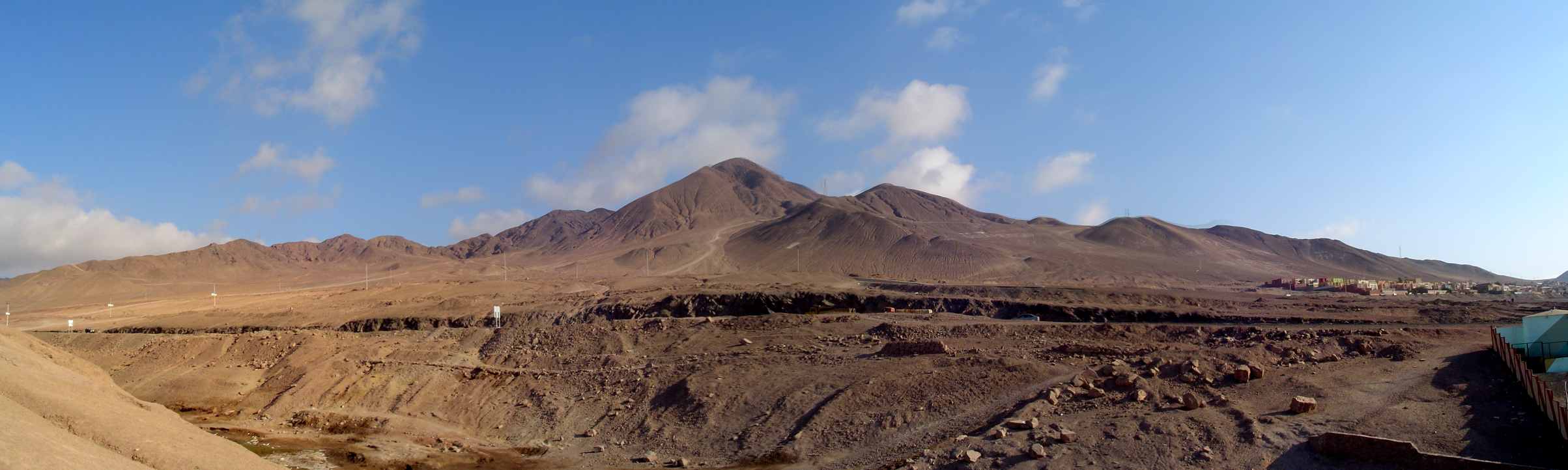
Quebrada El Carrizo

There are about fifteen streams that have watersheds with accumulation of sand and gravel. Within the broader watershed (hoya) are the "Hoya La Chimba", "Hoya Caracoles", "Hoya La Cadena", "Hoya La Negra" and "Hoya El Way". These watersheds and their streams (Quebrada), such as "Quebrada sin nombre", "Quebrada Baquedano", "Quebrada El Toro", "Quebrada El Carrizo" and "Quebrada Jardines del Sur", which helped cause the flood of 1991.

The coastal edge of Antofagasta is rocky and steep, so there are no natural beaches, the majority being artificial. Just north of the city, natural beaches extend to the areas of "La Portada", "Las Losetas" and "La Rinconada".

Within the water resources of the commune, there are different dry lakes (salar), among which include the Salar de Pajonales, Salar Mar Muerto, Salar Punta Negra and the Salar de Navidad.

== Government ==
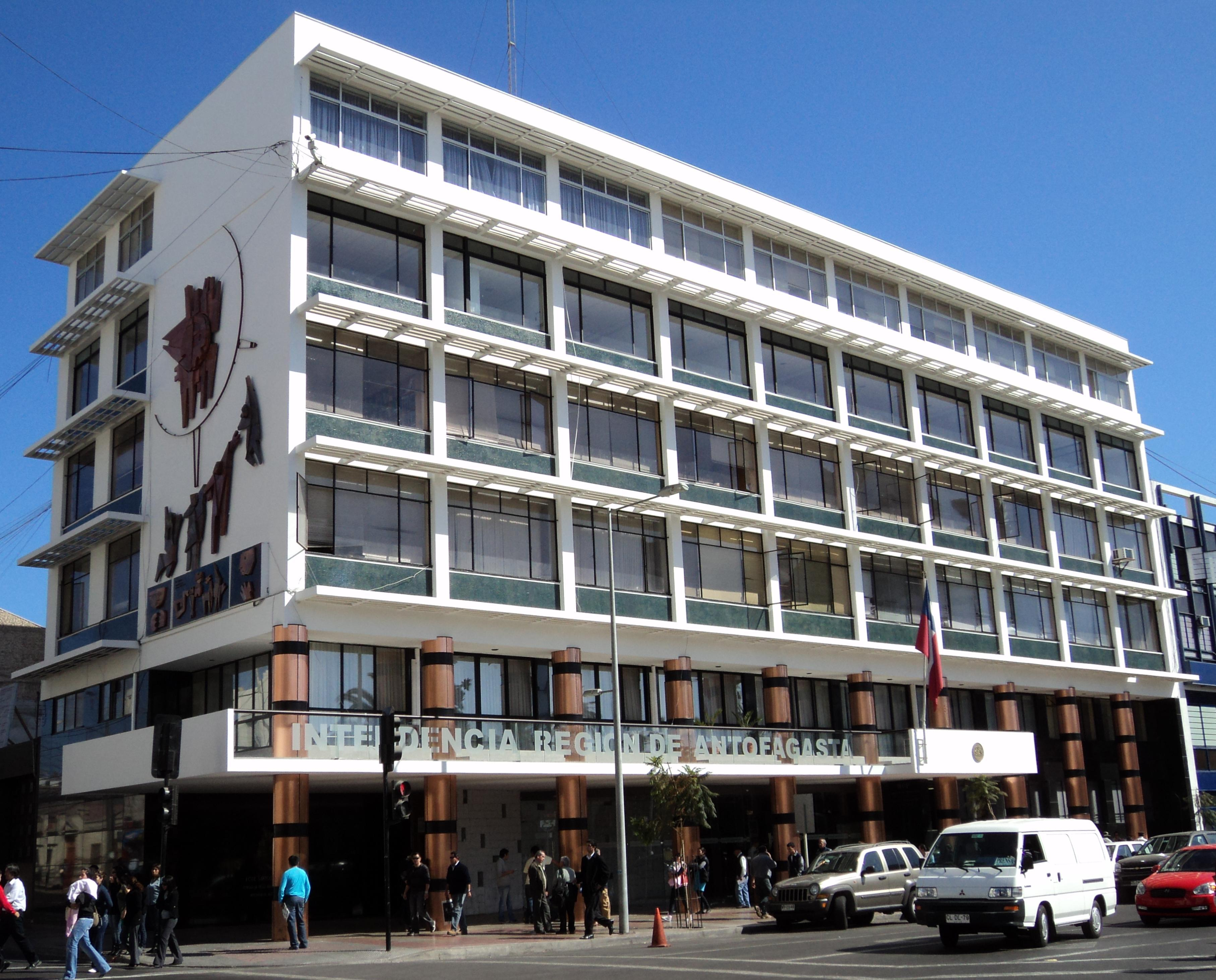
Regional government of Antofagasta

As a commune, Antofagasta is a third-level administrative division of Chile administered by a municipal council, headed by a mayor who is directly elected every four years. For the 2024–2028 term, the mayor is Sacha Razmilic (EVO), while the municipal council has the following members:

- Patricio Aguirre (REP)
- Claudio Aguirre (REP)
- Dinko Rendic (Ind./RN)
- Camilo Kong (FA)
- Ignacio Pozo (Ind./PR)
- Waldo Valderrama (PC)
- Carolina Rivera (EVO)
- María Tapia (PDG)
- Karina Guzmán (FRVS)
- Norma Leiva (PS)

Within the electoral divisions of Chile, Antofagasta is represented in the Chamber of Deputies by Marcela Hernando (PRSD) and Paulina Nuñez (RN) as part of the 4th electoral district, together with Mejillones, Sierra Gorda and Taltal. The commune is represented in the Senate by Pedro Araya (Progressive Convergence, 2014–2022) and Alejandro Guillier (Progressive Convergence, 2014–2022) as part of the 2nd senatorial constituency (Antofagasta Region).

The township has three local police courts. In addition, the Municipality of Antofagasta has a number of municipal headquarters, which are entities created to meet and control certain community needs a more specific way.

== Demographics ==
Historical population
| Year | Pop. | ±% p.a. |
|---|---|---|
| 1885 | 7,588 | — |
| 1895 | 13,530 | +5.95% |
| 1907 | 32,496 | +7.57% |
| 1920 | 53,531 | +3.91% |
| 1930 | 53,591 | +0.01% |
| 1940 | 49,106 | −0.87% |
| 1952 | 62,272 | +2.00% |
| 1960 | 88,597 | +4.51% |
| 1970 | 127,967 | +3.75% |
| 1982 | 186,341 | +3.18% |
| 1992 | 228,408 | +2.06% |
| 2002 | 296,905 | +2.66% |
| 2017 | 361,873 | +1.33% |
| 2024 | 401,096 | +1.48% |
Source: INE, Memoria Chilena

As of the 2024 census, the population is 401,096, of which 49.4% are males, and 50.6% are females. People under 15 years old make up 18.9% of the population, and people over 65 years old make up 9.7%. 99.3% of the population is urban and 0.7% is rural.

=== Ethnic minorities ===
As of the 2024 census, Indigenous peoples make up 8.0% of the population, and Afro-Chileans make up 1.5%.

=== Religion ===
As of the 2024 census, 70.8% of the population over 15 years old are Christians (55.1% Catholics, 11.7% Evangelicals or Protestants, and 4.0% other branches), 0.1% are Jews, 0.1% are Muslims, 0.1% are Buddhists, 0.02% are Hinduists, 0.4% are adrehents of other religions, and 28.6% are irreligious.

=== Immigration ===
As of the 2024 census, immigrants make up 19.1% of the population - 18.8% are from South America, 0.2% from North America, 0.1% from Europe, 0.1% from Asia, 0.01% from Africa, and 0.002% from Oceania.

== Economy ==
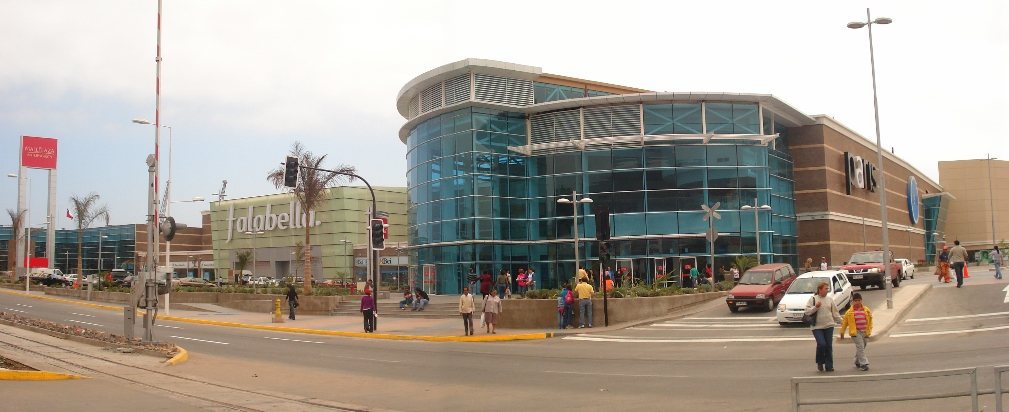
View of the main entrance of the Mall Plaza Antofagasta

Antofagasta's economic development is mainly based on copper mining and nonmetallic minerals such as nitrate and iodine.

There are refinery furnaces for the copper industry. Cement and lime are mined to aid copper refining. The area also has iron ore deposits, for steel.

The second industrial area is located in the north of the city, where they have installed multiple operating centers of different companies, mainly along the "Pedro Aguirre Cerda Avenue."

Since the 2010s, Antofagasta is a hub for lithium mining. Chile has the largest reserves of lithium worldwide and was the second largest producer in 2024, after Australia, and it is shipped from Antofagasta.

The port of Antofagasta is made of three individual terminals or ports which together stand for 2.0% of the annual tonnage of Chile's external trade as of 2024.

Trade is concentrated mainly in the center of Antofagasta, around the Plaza Colón, where within the last two decades several national retail chains were in place. In 2006, the national chain "Mall Plaza" was built in the coastal area and the "Casino Enjoy Antofagasta" was built in the south of the city.

=== Business tourism ===
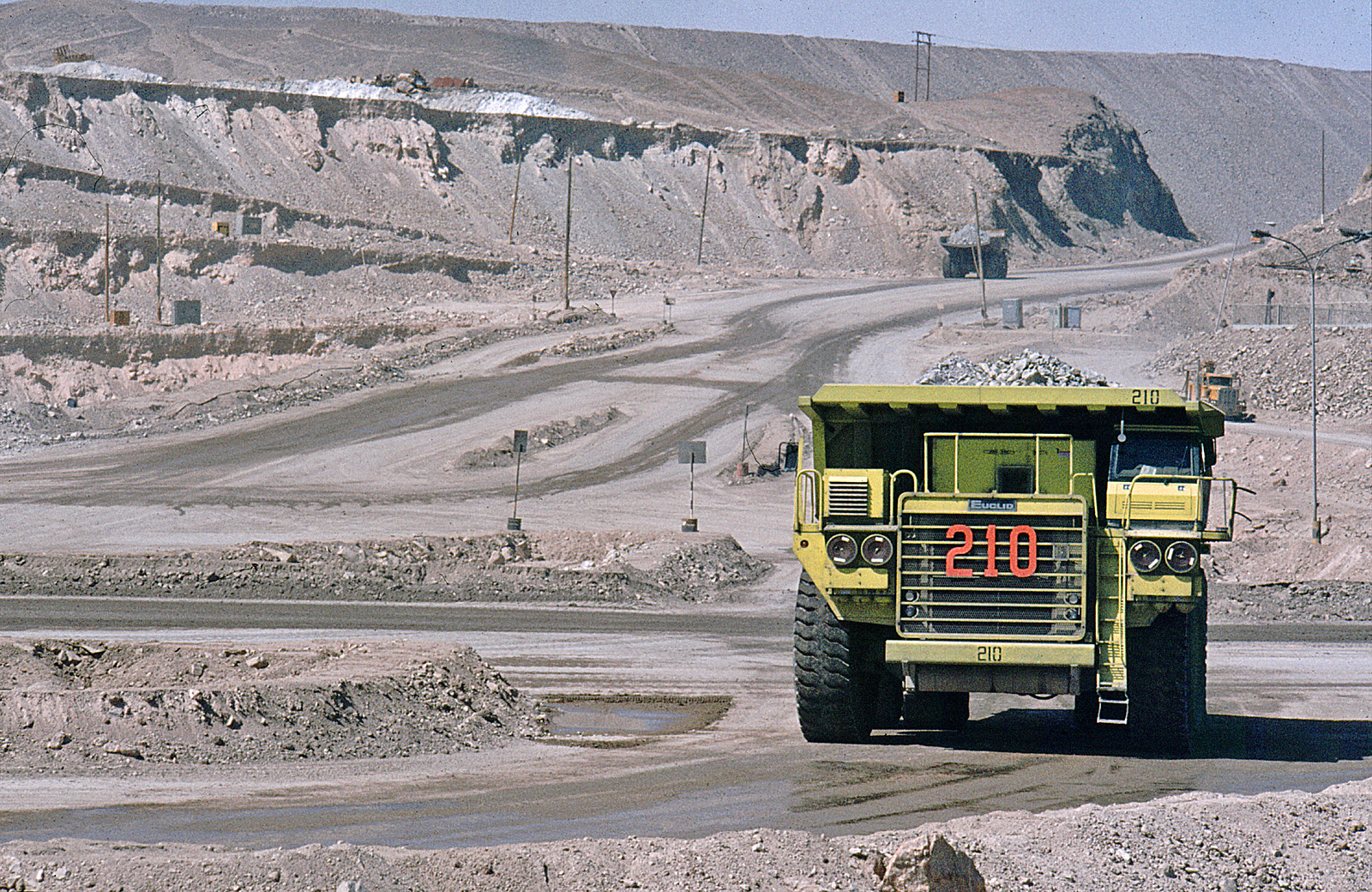
Mining is the main economic generator of the region.

Because of the important administrative position of Antofagasta in the region, the historical relationship with the mining sector, and the production of the 54% of copper at the national level, business events are held in Antofagasta.

Events are held annually with the assistance of several mining countries of the world, and one of the most important is Exponor organized by the Asociación de Industriales Antofagasta, guild formed by the major copper producers in the region. Exponor is a show that promotes the gestation of chains, new business and exchanging knowledge and experiences among entrepreneurs from different countries of the world. This important trade fair generated a portfolio of US$41,291 million (63.48% world total), for the period 2007–2015.

=== Cost of living ===
In 2024, Antofagasta is the fifth most expensive city in Chile as to cost of living. Santiago, Punta Arenas, Puerto Varas and San Antonio have a higher cost of living.

== Education ==
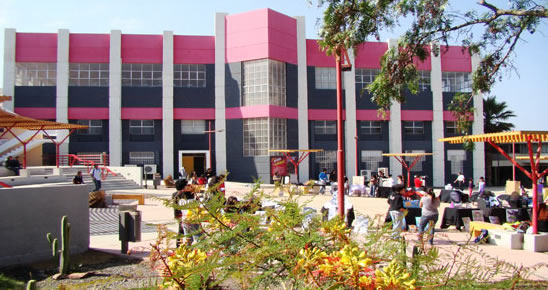
Central Library of the University of Antofagasta

The city has several public and private educational universities. Two major traditional universities, one that is public, University of Antofagasta, and other private, Catholic University of the North. Several private autonomous universities have been open since 2002. Previously, the now-defunct "University José Santos Ossa" was the only private autonomous university in Antofagasta.

Although the public schools are distributed almost uniformly throughout the city, the private schools operate mainly in the central and southern part of the city, where the wealthiest inhabitants reside. Only three private schools in the city are ranked among the top 100 schools in the country with the highest scores in the University Selection Test, which are The Antofagasta British School, "Hrvatska Skola San Esteban" and "Antofagasta International School".

Antofagasta is the first city in Chile which has a municipal school operating within a military compound: "Recovery Center for Integrative Studies in Military Training", located within the Reinforced Regiment No. 20 "La Concepción".

== Transport ==
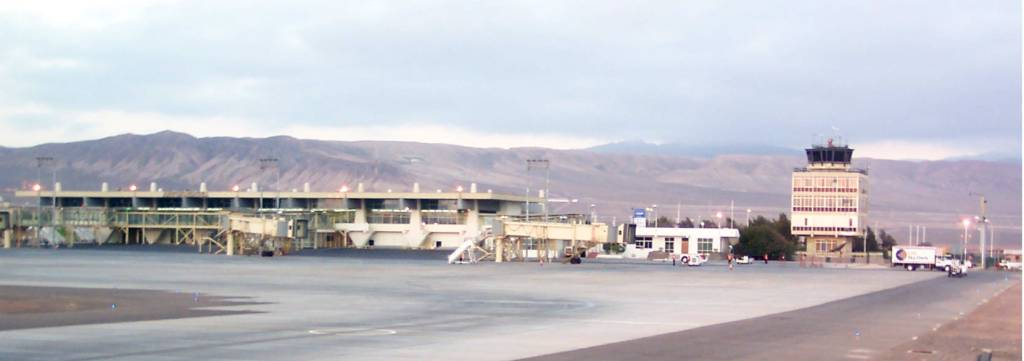
Andrés Sabella Gálvez International Airport

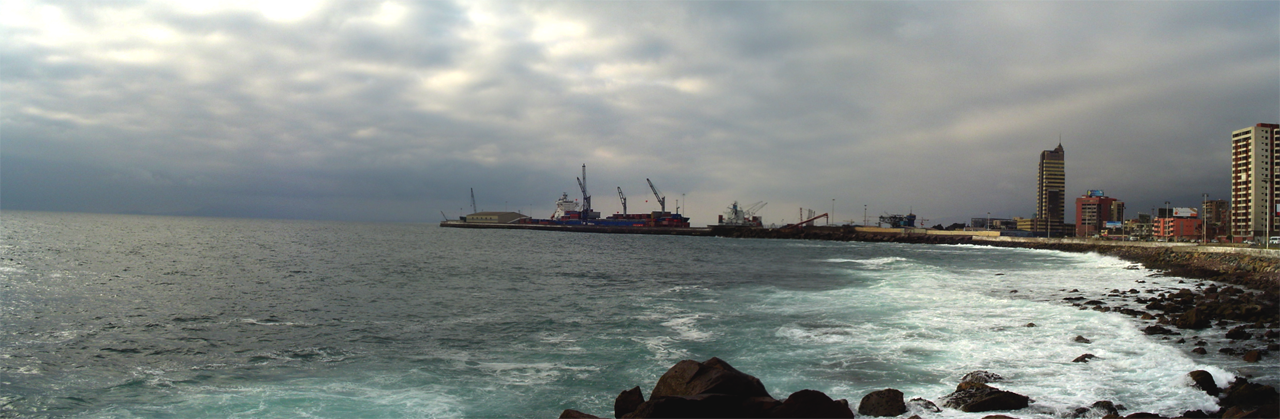
The port's southern area

=== Roads ===
The main land route connectivity in the province is Route 5-CH, which connects the city with the rest of the country and is part of the Panamerican Highway. This route connects to the city by Route CH-26 in the north of the city, and Route CH-28 to the south. In addition, the city is connected to the north of the country by Route 1-CH, a way that also allows access to Andrés Sabella Gálvez International Airport and the natural monument La Portada.

Vehicular traffic is concentrated around the main avenues of the city due to the long and narrow shape of the urban area. The only avenue that crosses the city from north to south, corresponds to the coastal route known as Avenida Costanera, which is formed by the avenues Jaime Guzmán, Ejército, República de Croacia, Grecia, José Manuel Balmaceda, Aníbal Pinto, 7º de Línea and Edmundo Pérez Zujovic; these avenues provide access to places including Mall Plaza Antofagasta, the Campus Coloso of the University of Antofagasta, the city hall of the Municipality of Antofagasta.

=== Airport ===
Andrés Sabella Gálvez International Airport is the only airport in Antofagasta and is located in Cerro Moreno, north of the city. This site, despite being classified as an international airport, operates mostly as a terminal for national flights, with one international airline, LATAM Peru, flying to Lima. In this terminal three domestic airlines also operate, LATAM Chile, JetSMART and Sky Airlines.

=== Port ===
The city has a port complex of seven docks, inaugurated by President Carlos Ibáñez del Campo on 14 February 1943 under the name of Puerto de Antofagasta, which consists of two terminals. Terminal 1, consists of the docks 1, 2 and 3, is multi-operator and is managed by the "Empresa Portuaria Antofagasta" (EPA) since 1 July 1998. Terminal No. 2, composed of docks 4, 5, 6 and 7, monooperario type, which is managed and operated by the company "Antofagasta Terminal Internacional" (ATI) since 1 March 2003. Overall, this tourist (member of the Association of Cruise Ports Southern Cone) and commercial port, can operate the production of 5,000,000 tons of cargo.

Escondida, the biggest private mining company in Chile, has a private port located in southern city, near Cerro Coloso.

=== Public transport ===
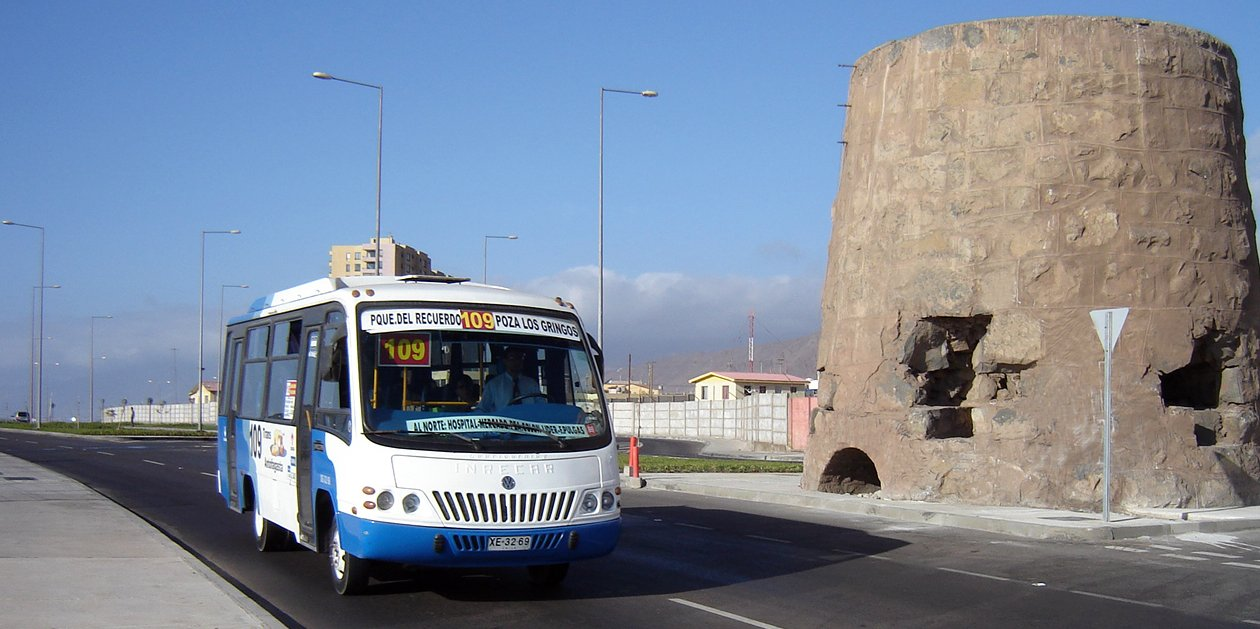
Bus of the TransAntofagasta

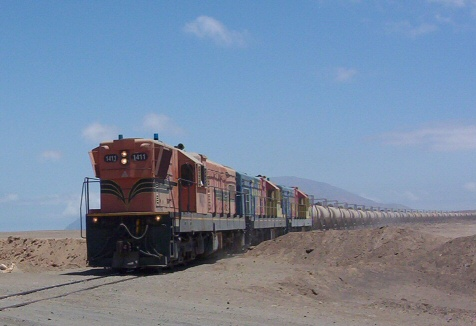
Antofagasta train to Bolivia (FCAB)

The higher transportation consists of thirteen lines of minibuses, which correspond to buses with a capacity of fewer than thirty people. The public transport is within a tender and is known as TransAntofagasta. The public transport plan took effect officially on 28 November 2005, replacing the old bus service. The route of these buses finish in the Caleta Coloso (south end of the city) during the year, and during the summer come as far as Balneario Juan Lopez, which is out of town.

The lower transport consists of taxis lines, corresponding to a black sedans that make their way through the urban area through fixed routes.

=== Railways ===
The most important railroad is the Ferrocarril de Antofagasta a Bolivia (FCAB) founded in 1888, during the economic boom of the saltpeter industry. In 1930, FCAB was acquired by Antofagasta PLC, which is part of the Quiñenco commercial group.

Unlike other contemporary mining railways, FCAB survived the crash of the natural nitrate sector. It provides a variety of transportation services – most notably, the transport of mining products and consumables such as copper cathodes and sulfuric acid – via a 900 kilometers (560 mi) long rail network that is connected to the Ferrocarril Andino de Bolivia, Ferronor (Chile), and Ferrocarril Belgrano in Argentina (Salta–Antofagasta railway). Its gauge is 1,000 mm (3 ft 3 3/8 in).

=== Future commuter rail ===
Due to the accelerated urban and demographic growth of Antofagasta during 2000–2010, a commuter train using the current FCAB line is currently under review. The project aims to decongest vehicle traffic by linking the north and south of the city with a direct train line.

== Sport ==
=== Football ===
The football club Deportes Antofagasta is part of the Campeonato Nacional Primera B (although it played two periods in the First División of Professional Football), and plays its home matches at Antofagasta Regional Stadium. Other football clubs of the city are the Club Deportivo Ormazábal and Club Deportivo Unión Bellavista which play in the Third Division A of Chile.

=== Other sports ===
Antofagasta was one of the host cities of the official 1959 Basketball World Cup, where Chile won the bronze medal.

In baseball, different teams are formed and maintained in competition since the last century, and the selection of the city dispute the national classic game with the selection of Tocopilla (historically the best team of baseball in Chile).

== International relations ==
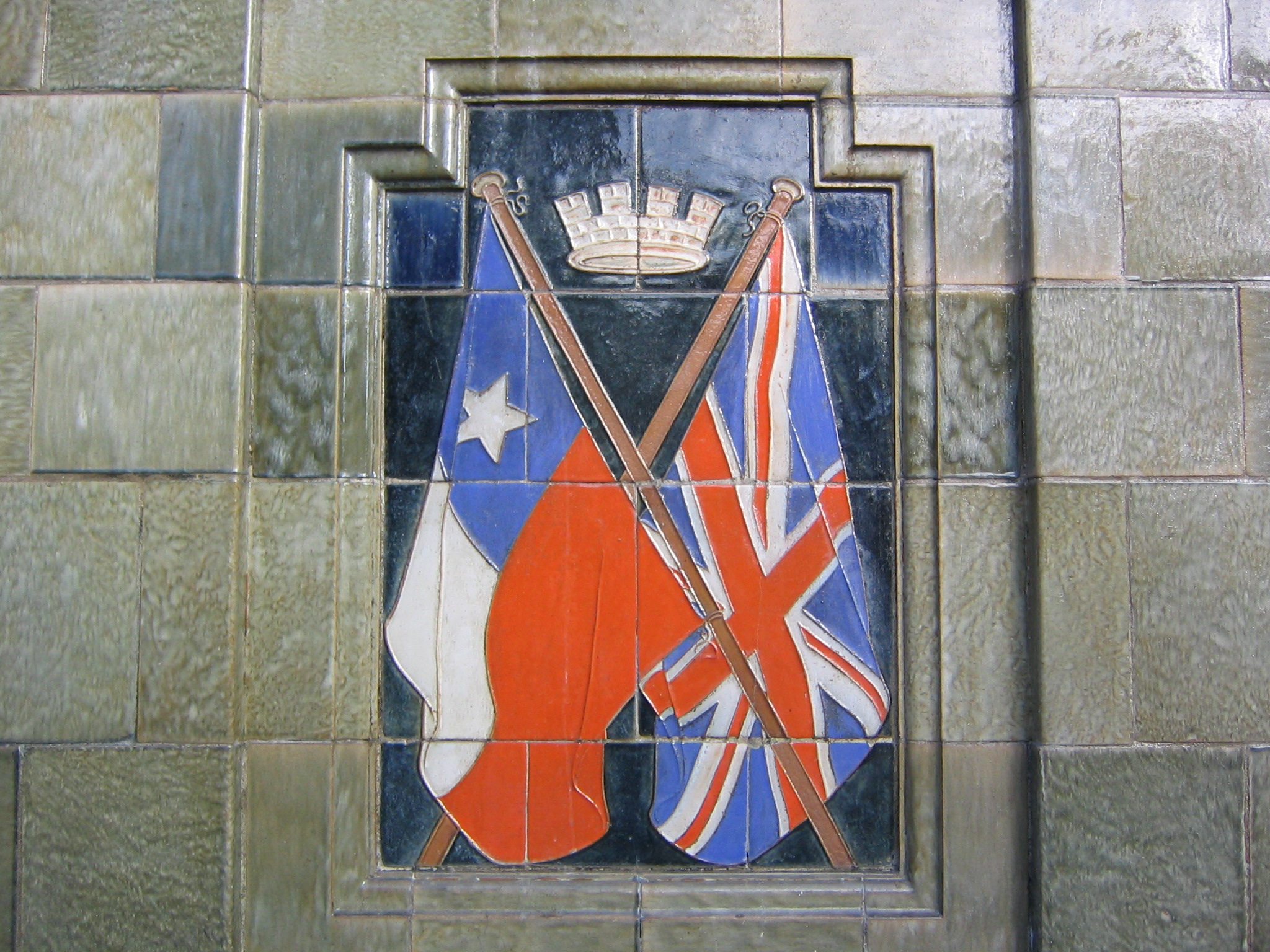
British and Chilean flags in a monument. British Chileans form a sizable population of Antofagasta.

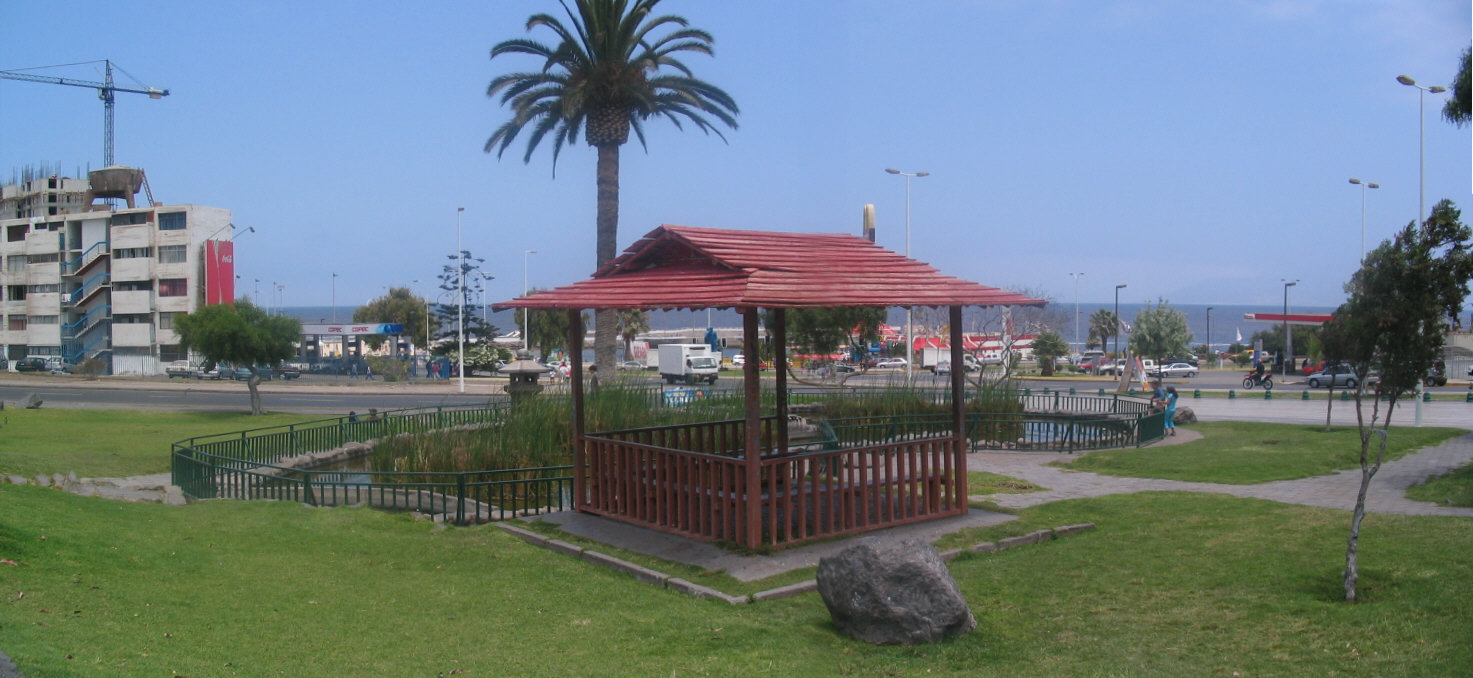
Japanese Park, built by Japanese Chileans

The city of Antofagasta is home to a number of international relations institutions, such as the Regional Unit for International Affairs (URAI) of the Regional Government of Antofagasta, responsible for analyzing and managing the region’s bilateral and multilateral relations with Latin America and the rest of the world; the Commission on Sustainability and International Relations of the Regional Council of Antofagasta; the regional office of the National Migration Service; the regional office of the General Directorate for Export Promotion (ProChile); the Department of Migration and International Police of the Investigations Police of Chile; and the Migrant Office of the Municipality of Antofagasta.

=== Internationalization in higher education ===
In the field of international relations and higher education, the main actors in Antofagasta are the Directorate of International Relations and Language Center of the University of Antofagasta, and the Directorate of International Relations of the Catholic University of the North.

=== Consulates ===
- Germany (Honorary Consulate)
- Argentina (Consulate General)
- Belgium (Honorary Consulate)
- Bolivia (Consulate)
- Canada (Honorary Consulate)
- Colombia (Consulate General)
- Croatia (Honorary Consulate)
- Denmark (Honorary Consulate)
- Ecuador (Honorary Consulate)
- Spain (Honorary Consulate)
- Finland (Honorary Consulate)
- France (Honorary Consulate)
- Greece (Honorary Consulate)
- Italy (Honorary Vice-Consulate)
- Netherlands (Honorary Consulate)
- Paraguay (Honorary Consulate)

=== Twin towns – sister cities ===
Antofagasta is twinned with:

- Ambato, Tungurahua, Ecuador
- Split, Split-Dalmatia, Croatia
- Tongling, Anhui, China
- Volos, Thessaly, Greece

== See also ==
- 2007 Tocopilla earthquake
- Antofagasta Region
- Norte Grande
