= José Santos Ossa =

Chilean explorer and businessman

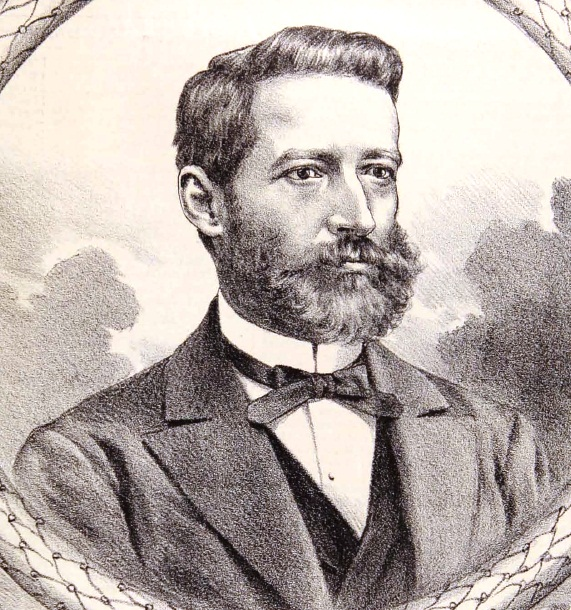
- Born: November 1, 1827; Huasco, Chile
- Died: August 5, 1878 (aged 50); Desventuradas Islands

José Santos Ossa Vega (November 1, 1827 — August 5, 1878) was an explorer and businessman. He founded the city of Antofagasta.

== Biography ==
Ossa was born in Huasco to Nicolás Ossa and Antonia Vega.

In 1875, Ossa travelled to the Desventuradas Islands (Unfortunate Islands) in search of guano. He contracted pneumonia and later died in 1878.
