= 2015 Northern Chile floods and mudflow =

2015 Northern Chile flash flood and mudflow
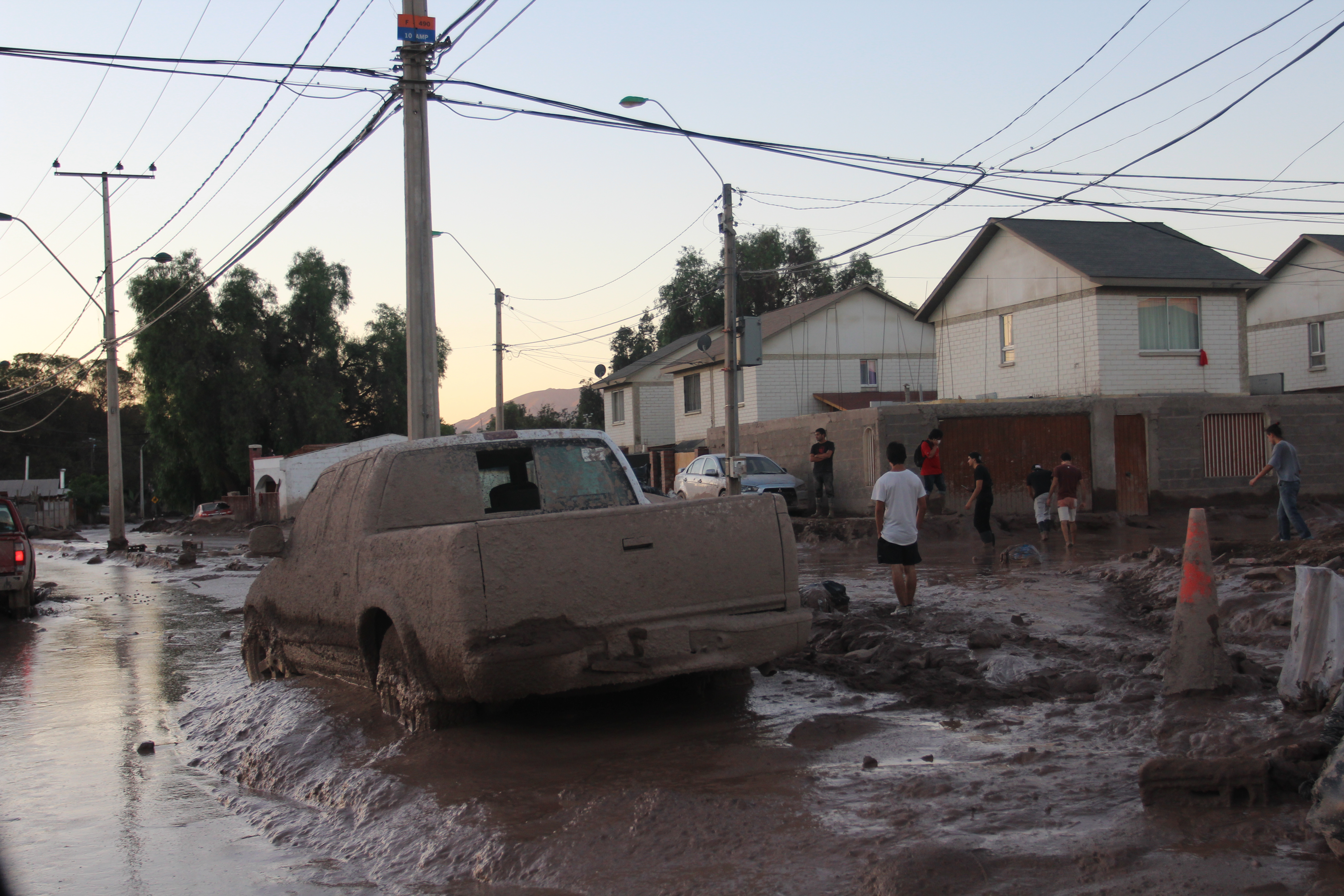
- Date: 23 March 2015 – 25 March 2015
- Location: Atacama, Antofagasta, Coquimbo regions, Chile.
- Deaths: 26 (125 missing)
- Property damage: 28,108 houses damaged or lost

The 2015 Northern Chile floods were a series of mudflows that affected much of northern Chile, product of flash floods from different rivers due to unseasonal heavy rains in the area, causing severe damage in several towns of the Antofagasta, Atacama and Coquimbo regions. Flooding in Chile and Peru resulted from an unusual cold front which moved across the Andes, bringing heavy rainfall to the region.

The National Office of Emergency of the Interior Ministry (ONEMI) has reported more than 27,413 people affected, 5,585 people on shelters and more than 300 isolated due to roads destruction. 26 people died during the mudflow and 101 are officially missing, although it is expected that these numbers will increase as contact is reestablished with remote communities. Preliminary figures show that property damage reaches more than 28,000 houses, of those 105 are completely destroyed, and at least 5,900 present severe damages.

== State of emergency ==
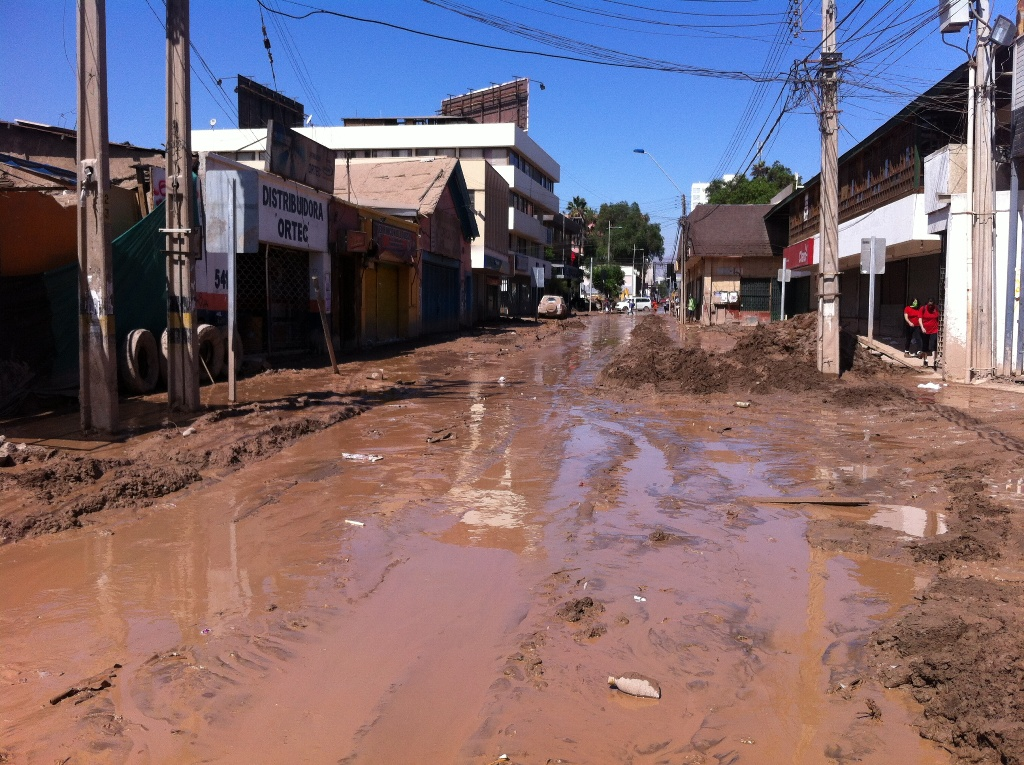
Los Carrera Avenue in Copiapó

On March 25, around 17:00 (UTC -3), the president of Chile, Michelle Bachelet, declared a Constitutional State of Exceptional Catastrophe throughout the Atacama Region due to the serious events caused by flooding. About 320,000 people, mainly settled in the cities of Copiapó and Vallenar, were affected by this order. The order allowed the Armed Forces of Chile to take control of the area in order to protect and maintain public order in the affected area. The officer in charge was Chief Lieutenant Colonel Marcel Urrutia Caro of the Chilean Army. Hours later, a state of emergency was also extended to the city of Antofagasta.

President Bachelet was in the areas affected by floods since March 25. She visited Chañaral on March 26, and that same day was declared curfew across the Atacama region between 23:00 to 6:00. Marines were deployed in Chañaral to contain looting found in some shops during the day.

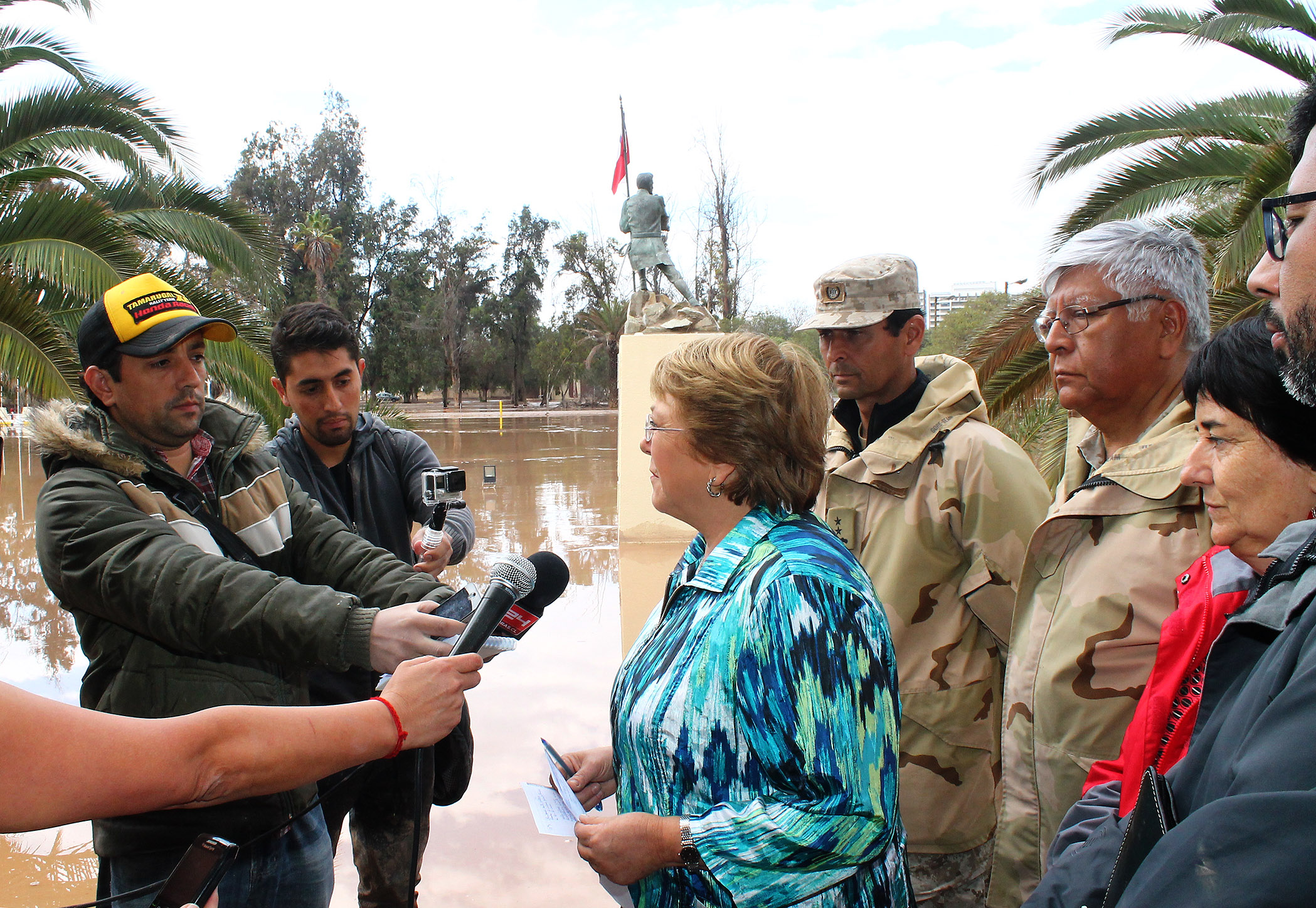
President Michelle Bachelet visiting the affected area

The authorities and citizens reported cases of speculation and hoarding of food and staples. The government filed a lawsuit against those committing unjustified price gouging, and rationed the sale of certain products and fuels in supermarkets and service stations. In La Serena and Coquimbo, stocks of bottled water sold out due to problems with processing water at Elqui River.

The Chilean Navy sent the barges Rancagua and Chacabuco, emergency vehicles, supplies and Marines, along with the ship Sergeant Aldea to the port of Chañaral. The government allocated 1.1 billion Chilean peso for the reconstruction.

== See also ==
- 1991 Antofagasta mudflows
- 2002 Northern Chile floods and mudflow
- Mudflow
- Flash flood
- Emergency Response Coordination Centre (ERCC) –ECHO Daily Map 27/3/2015: Chile floods
