= 2002 Northern Chile floods and mudflow =

Natural disaster in Chile

The 2002 Northern Chile floods and mudflow were a series of flash floods and mudflows that affected north-central Chile in early June 2002. The floods and mudflows were the result of heavy rains in the area. Overall 17 human casualties can be attributed to the rainfalls. Among the casualties, there were twelve direct deaths, four indirect deaths and one disappearance. The Locality of Los Molles was particularly badly affected.

According to National Office of Emergency of the Interior Ministry (ONEMI) 71 and 347 houses were destroyed in Coquimbo and Valparaíso regions respectively.

== See also ==
- 1991 Antofagasta mudflows
- 2015 Northern Chile floods and mudflow
- 2016–17 South American floods
