= 1958 in Chile =

- Decades: 1930s; 1940s; 1950s; 1960s; 1970s
- See also: Other events of 1958; Timeline of Chilean history

The following lists events that happened during 1958 in Chile.

== Incumbents ==
- President of Chile: Carlos Ibáñez del Campo (until 3 November), Jorge Alessandri

== Events ==
- January–June – Snipe incident

=== March ===
- 3 March - The national identity card is created. To avoid fraud, the document must always bear all the names (they can be 1, 2, 3, or even 4), the surnames of both parents (in the old days, if the father did not recognize the child, he or she had to bear the mother's first surname as both surnames), nationality (Chile or another country), date of birth (any) and the Unique National Role or RUN.

=== August ===
- 5 August – The Law of Permanent Defense of Democracy is repealed.

=== September ===
- 4 September – Chilean presidential election, 1958 and The Las Melosas earthquake occurs in Cajón del Maipo, with an intensity of 7.3 degrees on the Richter scale. There were 4 people dead, 35 injured and 175 homeless.

=== November ===
- 1 November - Ladeco, an airline established at the Los Cerrillos Airport, in Santiago, is inaugurated.
- 3 November - Assumes as President of Chile, Jorge Alessandri, whose term will last until November 3, 1964.

== Births ==
- 10 January – Fernando Santis
- 13 January – Ricardo Acuña
- 22 April – Jorge Orlando Aravena Plaza
- 29 April – Carlos Ramos (Chilean footballer)
- 21 June – Raúl Ormeño
- 28 July – Alejandro Silva (athlete)
- 12 August – Pablo Longueira
- 18 August – Edgardo Fuentes
- 12 September – Sergio Salgado
- 15 November – Oscar Rojas (Chilean footballer)
- 8 December – Alejandra Ramos

== Deaths ==
- 11 November – Germán Ignacio Riesco (b. 1888)
