= 1955 in Chile =

- Decades: 1930s; 1940s; 1950s; 1960s; 1970s
- See also: Other events of 1955; Timeline of Chilean history

The following lists events that happened during 1955 in Chile.

== Incumbents ==
- President of Chile: Carlos Ibáñez del Campo

== Events ==
=== February ===
- 18 February - In Antarctica, the Chilean Aguirre Cerda Research Station is inaugurated on Deception Island.
- 27 February - The 1955 South American Championship begins.

=== March ===
- 30 March - The 1955 South American Championship ends. The first place was obtained by Argentina and the second place, Chile.

=== April ===
- 7 April - The O'Higgins Sports Club is founded in the city of Rancagua.

=== June ===
- 12 June - closes the evening newspaper Los Tiempos.

=== July ===
- 17 July – San Bernardo train crash

=== October ===
- 1 October – Finance minister Abraham Perez resigns due to disagreements with President Campo.

=== November ===
- 19 November - The Deportes Linares soccer team is founded in the city of Linares.

== Births ==
- 13 January – Eduardo Bonvallet (d. 2015)
- 27 February – Belus Prajoux
- 20 April – René Valenzuela
- 23 April – Juan Giha
- 15 June – Iván Flores
- 21 June – Juan Carlos Orellana
- 10 August – Gustavo Moscoso
- 5 November – Oscar Wirth
- 19 December – Alfredo Castro (actor)

== Deaths ==
- 13 October – Alberto Cabero (b. 1874)
- 19 October – Carlos Dávila (b. 1887)
- 27 October – Tulio Manuel Cestero (b. 1877)
