= 1960 in Chile =

- Decades: 1940s; 1950s; 1960s; 1970s; 1980s
- See also: Other events of 1960; Timeline of Chilean history

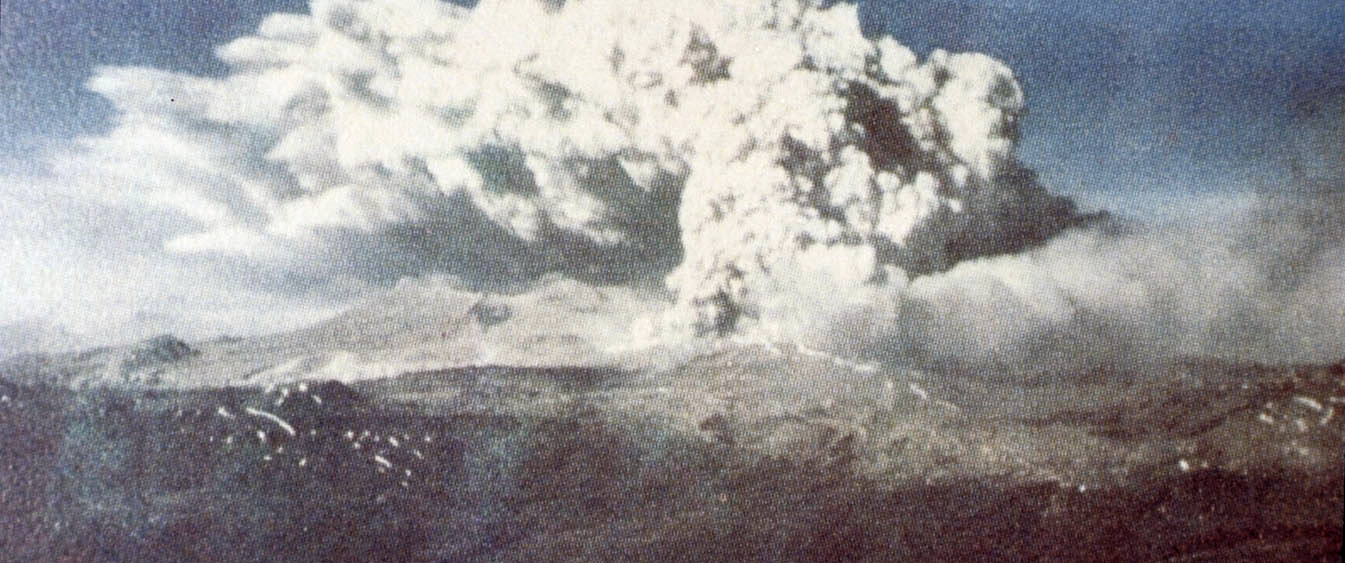
The 1960 eruption of Cordon Caulle as a result of the 1960 Valdivia earthquake resulted in no deaths due to the successful evacuation plan..

The following lists events that happened during 1960 in Chile.

== Incumbents ==
- President of Chile: Jorge Alessandri

== Events ==
=== January ===
- 1 January – The Chilean escudo is placed in circulation.

=== February ===
- 18 February – Chile signs the Montevideo Treaty, which creates the Latin American Free Trade Association (ALALC).
- 21 February – The first Viña del Mar International Song Festival is held.

=== April ===
- 3 April – Municipal elections are held.

=== May ===
- 22 May – The 1960 Valdivia earthquake occurs; with a magnitude of 9.5 MW, it is the largest recorded earthquake. Its epicenter was the city of Valdivia and mainly affected the area between Talca and Chiloé Archipelago. The earthquake was felt in different parts of the planet and produced a tidal wave which affected various locations throughout the Pacific Ocean such as Hawaii and Japan. It also caused the eruption of the Puyehue-Cordón Caulle, which covered the Puyehue Lake with ashes. Between 1,655 and 2,000 people died, and more than 2 million were affected by this disaster.

=== June ===
- 5 June – Diario Clarín reports that Valdivia is being evacuated due to the imminent overflow of Lake Riñihue.

=== September ===
- 18 September – The National Democratic Party is founded.

=== October ===
- 3-18 October – The 1960 Ibero-American Games are held in the city of Santiago.

=== November ===
- 4 November – The Television Corporation of the University of Chile, Channel 9, begins its transmissions from the city of Santiago
- 29 November – The National Institute of Statistics (INE) carries out the XIII National Population Census and the II Housing Census.

== Births ==
- 2 February – Daniel Ahumada
- 16 February – Alfredo Nuñez (d. 2008)
- 26 February – Tati Penna (d. 2021)
- 3 July – Jorge Contreras
- 5 July – Hugo Rubio
- 2 August – Paulina Nin de Cardona
- 30 August – Andrés Velasco
- 30 November – Pamela Jiles
- 17 December – Pedro Rebolledo

== Deaths ==
- 28 April – Carlos Ibáñez del Campo (b. 1877)
