= 1959 in Chile =

- Decades: 1930s; 1940s; 1950s; 1960s; 1970s
- See also: Other events of 1959; Timeline of Chilean history

The following lists events that happened during 1959 in Chile.

== Incumbents ==
- President of Chile: Jorge Alessandri

== Events ==
=== January ===
- 16 January - The 1959 FIBA World Championship is held in the country. The tournament takes place in the cities of Antofagasta, Valparaíso, Santiago, Concepción and Temuco.
- 19 January – Interior Minister Enrique Ortuzar resigns on health grounds.

=== March ===
- 6 March - It is inaugurated St.Matthew's College in the city of Osorno.

=== June ===
- 13 June - The IANSA Linares plant is inaugurated.

=== July ===
- 31 July - The D.F.L. No. 2. It is established as the deadline in which the building can be regularized as old according to the General Ordinance of Urban Planning and Construction.

=== August ===
- August 21 - The Television Corporation of the Pontifical Catholic University of Chile, the second Chilean television channel, currently known as Canal 13, begins its transmissions.
- August 22 - Regular broadcasts of UCV Television begin in the city of Valparaíso.

=== November ===
- November 7 - Radio Andrés Bello begins its broadcasts.

=== December ===
- December 1 - In Washington D.C. (United States), Chile signs the Antarctic Treaty. Through its provisions, the treaty prevents the denial or affirmation of sovereignty over the white continent.

== Births ==
- 1 January – Cecilia Serrano
- 13 February – Luis Hormazábal
- 20 May – Juan Carlos Letelier
- 30 June – Rodrigo Jordan
- 30 July – Sergio Pacheco
- 1 October – Leo Caprile
- 3 October – Luis Mosquera
- 20 October – Ricardo J. Caballero
- 1 December – Omar Aguilar

== Deaths ==
- 14 June – Jerónimo Méndez (b. 1887)
