= 1953 in Chile =

- Decades: 1930s; 1940s; 1950s; 1960s; 1970s
- See also: Other events of 1953; Timeline of Chilean history

The following lists events that happened during 1953 in Chile.

== Incumbents ==
- President of Chile: Carlos Ibáñez del Campo

== Events ==
=== January ===
- 1 January - A fire in a barracks in Valparaíso causes an explosion that kills 50 people, including 36 firefighters. The incident was caused by a flare launched at the New Year's celebrations.

=== February ===
- 13 February - The Central Unitaria de Traballadores(CUT) is created, which brings together the majority of the country's trade union centrals, and that day it celebrates its constituent congress.
- 16 February - The evening newspaper Los Tiempos returns to circulation after 21 years.

=== March ===
- 1 March – Chilean parliamentary election, 1953
- 23 March - The Ministry of Mining is created, with Eduardo Paredes serving as its prime minister.

=== May ===
- 6 May – 1953 Concepción earthquake

=== June ===
- 15 June – Seven people were killed when a Chilean airliner exploded and crashed at the Copiapo airport.

=== July ===
- 24 July - Carlos Ibáñez del Campo signs the DFL 126 of 1953 of the Ministry of Finance that creates the Banco del Estado de Chile.

=== December ===
- 6 December - The Calama Earthquake occurs. With a magnitude of 7.4 degrees on the Richter scale, it affects the Antofagasta Region. The earthquake leaves 3 dead and 15 injured.

== Births ==
- 3 January – Nicolás Eyzaguirre
- 2 June – Osvaldo Andrade
- 6 June – Mauricio Redolés
- 28 April – Roberto Bolaño (d. 2003)
- 16 August – Sebastián Edwards
- 11 September – Rodolfo Dubó
- 23 October – Joaquín Lavín
- 11 November – Evelyn Matthei
- 18 December – José Antonio Gómez
- 22 December – Coca Guazzini

== Deaths ==
- 7 March – Juan Brüggen (b. 1887)
