= Chile Day =

Annual event held in London and New York City

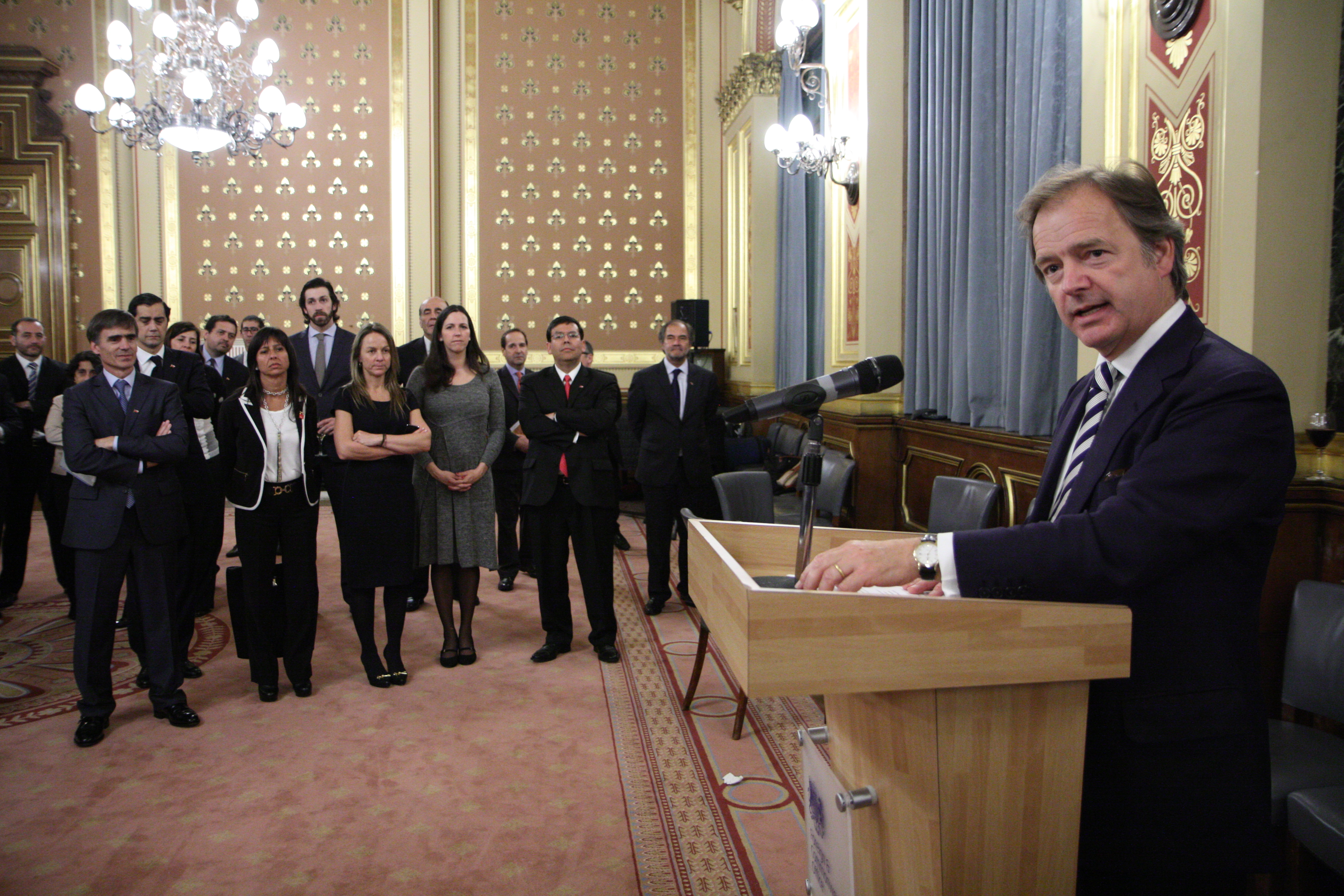
Foreign Office Minister Hugo Swire speaking at a Chilean National Day event 2014 in London

Chile Day is an annual event held in London, United Kingdom, and New York, United States. The main purpose of the event is to promote the Chilean national branding, attract foreign investment, promote tourism in Chile and advertise Chilean export goods while also strengthening Chilean-British and Chilean-American socio-cultural ties. This day was initiated by Minister of Finance, Felipe Larraín Bascuñáin in 2011.

A special edition of the event was held in the Czech city of Liberec in 2016.

The first Chile Day for 2018 was held in April in New York City, the second Chile Day will be held on 6–7 September in London.
