= 1956 in Chile =

- Decades: 1930s; 1940s; 1950s; 1960s; 1970s
- See also: Other events of 1956; Timeline of Chilean history

The following lists events that happened during 1956 in Chile.

== Incumbents ==
- President of Chile: Carlos Ibáñez del Campo

== Events ==
=== January ===
- 3 January – Foreign Minister Kaare Olsen Nielsen resigns to return to active service. José Serrano Palma is appointed successor.

=== February ===
- 14 February – 1956 Santiago rail crash

=== April ===
- 21 April – At least 38 people are killed when a bus plunges off a bridge near Calama.

=== June ===
- 10 June - At the FIFA congress held in Lisbon, Chile is chosen to host the 1962 FIFA World Cup.

=== August ===
- 2 August - The National Party (1956-1958) is created, product of the merger of the National Independent Movement, the National Agrarian Party and the Agrarian Labor Recoveryist Party.

== Births ==
- 2 January – Andrés Chadwick, politician
- 2 January – Eduardo Fournier, footballer
- 24 January – Samy Benmayor, painter
- 7 February – Andrés Allamand, politician
- 19 July – Tomás Hirsch, politician
- 4 August – Alfredo Moreno Charme, politician
- 31 August – Cristián Campos, actor
- 23 September – Juan Núñez, tennis player
- 4 November – Alberto Espina, politician
- 8 December – Iván Moreira, politician
- 30 December – Claudia di Girolamo, actress

== Deaths ==
- 6 August – Adelqui Migliar (b. 1891)
