= 1965 in Chile =

- Decades: 1940s; 1950s; 1960s; 1970s; 1980s
- See also: Other events of 1965; Timeline of Chilean history

The following lists events that happened during 1965 in Chile.

== Incumbents ==
- President of Chile: Eduardo Frei Montalva

== Events ==
=== February ===
- 6 February – LAN Chile Flight 107 crashes in the Andes.
- 19 February - The sixth version of the Viña del Mar International Song Festival takes place.
- Lake Cabrera tragedy: an avalanche that occurred in Lake Cabrera located at the foot of the Yates and Hornopirén volcanoes (current Hualaihué commune) in the early hours of the morning caused a giant wave and the disappearance and death of 26 people

=== March ===
- 7 March – Chilean parliamentary election, 1965, Christian Democratic Party obtains an absolute majority in the Chamber of Deputies
- 28 March – 1965 Valparaíso earthquake and the El Cobre dam failures With a magnitude of 7.4 degrees on the Richter scale, it leaves 280 dead and hundreds injured. The earthquake is perceived from Copiapó to Osorno, from North to South, and to Buenos Aires to the east.

=== July ===
- 3-25 July - Tour of President Eduardo Frei Montalva through Europe (Spain, Portugal, France and Italy) and South America (Brazil, Argentina, Uruguay, Venezuela, Colombia and Ecuador).

=== October ===
- 15 October – Sinking of Janequeo and Leucoton

=== November ===
- 6 November – Laguna del Desierto incident
- 13 November - Robert Kennedy, on a visit to Chile, passes through the city of Linares.

=== December ===
- 16 December - The Ministry of Housing and Urbanism (Chile) is created, in charge of the planning, development and construction of houses, in addition to planning the urbanization of cities.

== Births ==
- 3 February – Jacqueline van Rysselberghe
- 6 March – Amparo Noguera
- 25 March – Mario Lepe
- 13 April – Mathias Klotz
- 17 April – Luis Pérez (Chilean footballer)
- 2 May – Myriam Hernández
- 12 May – Carolina Tohá
- 19 May – Cecilia Bolocco
- 19 May – Nicolás Larraín
- 29 May – Marcelo Ramírez
- 26 August – Carolina Arregui
- 31 August – Ricardo Gónzalez (footballer)
- 29 September – Francisco Undurraga
- 5 October – Alberto Arenas
- 25 October – Luis Jara (singer)
- 27 October – Rodrigo Hinzpeter

== Deaths ==
- 25 March – Oscar Cristi (born 1916)
- 23 August – Francisco Antonio Encina (born 1874)
