= Rodrigo Valdés =

Chilean economist and politician

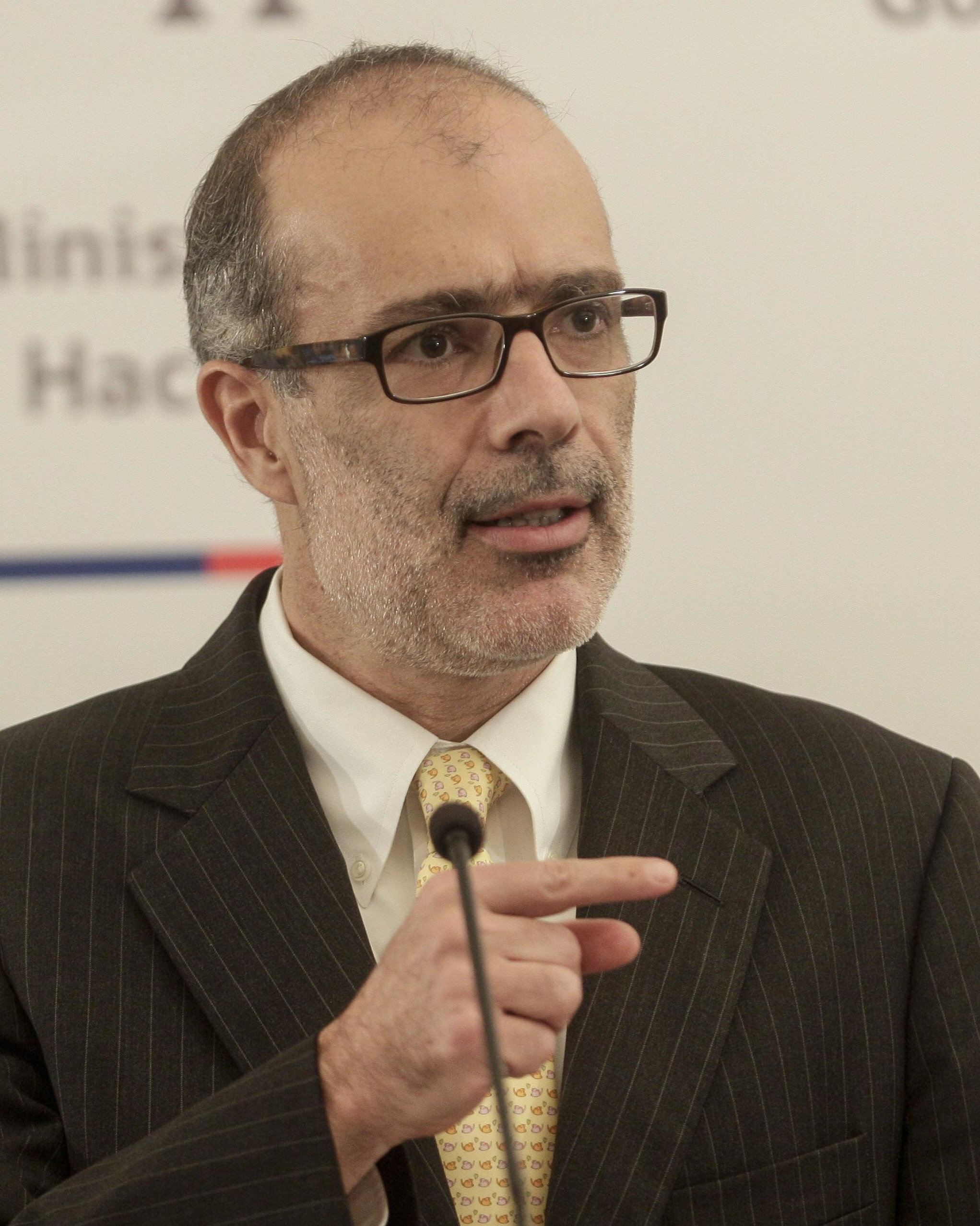
- Valdés in 2016

Director of the Fiscal Affairs Department of the International Monetary Fund
- Incumbent
- Assumed office 27 October 2025
- Preceded by: Vítor Gaspar

Minister of Finance
- In office 11 May 2015 – 31 August 2017
- President: Michelle Bachelet
- Preceded by: Alberto Arenas
- Succeeded by: Felipe Larraín Bascuñán

Personal details
- Born: 26 November 1966 (age 59) Santiago, Chile
- Party: Party for Democracy
- Other political affiliations: New Majority
- Education: University of Chile; Massachusetts Institute of Technology

Rodrigo Osvaldo Valdés Pulido (Note: In this Spanish name, the first or paternal surname is Valdés and the second or maternal family name is Pulido.) (born 26 November 1966) is a Chilean economist and politician who served as minister of finance from May 11, 2015 to August 31, 2017 under president Michelle Bachelet.

== Education ==
Valdés has an MBA and degree in economics from the Universidad de Chile as well as a doctorate in economics from the Massachusetts Institute of Technology (MIT).

== Career ==
Before becoming Minister of Finance, Valdés served as Chairman of the Board of Directors and of the Executive Committee of state-run bank Banco del Estado de Chile. He also worked as chief economist for the Andean Region and Argentina at Brazilian investment bank BTG Pactual (2012-2014); as Deputy Director of the European Department, Deputy Director of the Western Hemisphere Department and mission chief for the United States at the International Monetary Fund (2009-2012); and as chief economist for Latin America at Barclays Capital (2008-2009), among other jobs.

Valdés was appointed to the Bachelet government during a political crisis triggered by corruption scandals that, at the time, had seen the President’s popularity ratings sink to record lows. Early in his term as, he embarked on a reform agenda that he saw himself forced to water down shortly after because of an economic slowdown. He also led the government’s efforts to reform the pension system. Along with his deputy Alejandro Micco and economy minister Luis Carlos Cespedes, Valdés resigned shortly ahead of the 2017 elections; he was replaced by Nicolás Eyzaguirre.

In 2018, IMF Managing Director Christine Lagarde appointed Valdés to the External Advisory Group on Surveillance, a group mandated to review the Fund's operational priorities through 2025.

== Notes ==
Political offices
Preceded by Alberto Arenas	Minister of Finance; 2015–2018	Succeeded by Felipe Larraín Bascuñán
