= 1968 in Chile =

- Decades: 1940s; 1950s; 1960s; 1970s; 1980s
- See also: Other events of 1968; Timeline of Chilean history

The following lists events that happened during 1968 in Chile.

== Incumbents ==
- President of Chile: Eduardo Frei Montalva

== Events ==
=== January ===
- 22 January – a fire in Viña del Mar destroyed 600 hectares of vegetation and more than 200 houses in the upper sector of the city.

=== February ===
- 1 February – The newspaper El Mercurio de Calama is founded.

Law 16744 is published, which establishes regulations on work accidents and professional illnesses

- 2–12 February – The ninth version of the Viña del Mar International Song Festival is held.

=== March ===
- 12 March – A bomb explodes in the women's restroom on the second floor of the United States Embassy in Santiago. The room was empty at the time of the explosion.

=== May ===
- 19 May – Despite the fact that the country is in autumn, there is a heavy snowfall that affects from La Serena to Puerto Montt.
- 24 May – Through the publication of Law 16840, the holidays of Saint Peter and Saint Paul (restored in 1985), Ascension of the Lord and Corpus Christi (restored in 1987) are eliminated.

=== June ===
- June 28 – The first heart transplant in Chile and Latin America, and the second in the world, is performed by surgeon Jorge Kaplán at the Almirante Nef Naval Hospital in Viña del Mar to patient María Elena Peñaloza.

=== August ===
- 11 August – A group of 9 priests, 3 nuns and 200 lay people identified with the Christians for Socialism current take over the Metropolitan Cathedral of Santiago as a protest against the visit of Pope Paul VI to the International Eucharistic Congress in Bogotá (Colombia), the prohibition of contraceptives and the construction of the Votive Temple of Maipú. On the altar, the group places posters of Che Guevara and Camilo Torres, while outside they display a canvas with the legend "For a church next to the people and their struggle"

The latest edition of the newspaper El Regional de Coquimbo circulates.

=== November ===
- 11 November – Queen Elizabeth starts a state visit to República de Chile.

=== December ===
- 12 December – The broadcasts of the first local station of National Television of Chile begin, in Arica.

== Births ==
- 11 January – Sergio Cortés
- 19 May – Javiera Parra
- 22 May – Gabriel Mendoza
- 14 September – Jorge Gómez
- 18 September – Cristián Castañeda
- 5 October – Fabián Estay
- 5 December – José Luis Sierra

== Deaths ==
- 10 September – Pablo de Rokha (b. 1894)
