= 1966 in Chile =

- Decades: 1940s; 1950s; 1960s; 1970s; 1980s
- See also: Other events of 1966; Timeline of Chilean history

The following lists events that happened during 1966 in Chile.

== Incumbents ==
- President of Chile: Eduardo Frei Montalva

== Events ==
=== January ===
- 13 January - Archipiélago de Juan Fernández National Park receive new names: Robinson Crusoe (formerly Mas a Tierra) and Alexander Selkirk (formerly Más Afuera)
- 16 January - At the initiative of Senator Salvador Allende, the 27 Latin American delegations decide to create OLAS (Latin American Solidarity Organization), which calls on the Latin American peoples to "make the Andes mountain range a gigantic tricontinental Sierra Maestra."

=== February ===
- 11 February - The seventh version of the Viña del Mar International Song Festival is held.

=== March ===
- 13 March - Through the publication of Law 16441, the department of Easter Island is created.

=== May ===
- 2 May - The newspaper La Estrella del Norte is founded in the city of Antofagasta.

=== July ===
- 12-22 July - The FIS Alpine World Ski Championships 1966 is held in the town of Portillo, 80 km east of the Los Andes.

=== August ===
- 29 August- The President of the Republic, Eduardo Frei Montalva, and the Secretary General of the United Nations, U Thant, inaugurate the ECLAC Building, headquarters of the Economic Commission for Latin America and the Caribbean, in the Vitacura Commune.

=== October ===
- 17 October - The earthquake of Lima and Callao (Peru) occurs, with a magnitude of 7.2 degrees on the Richter scale, which is perceived in the cities of Arica, Iquique, Antofagasta, Tocopilla and Calama.

=== November ===
- 10 November- The San Juan (Argentina) earthquake occurs, with a magnitude of 5.9 degrees on the Richter scale, which is felt in the cities of La Serena, Ovalle, Illapel, La Ligua and Los Andes.

=== December ===
- 1 December - The newspaper La Estrella de Iquique is founded.
- 28 December - The Taltal earthquake occurs. With a magnitude of 8.1 degrees on the Richter scale, the earthquake causes a tidal wave that could be seen from Lima (Peru) to Talcahuano. 6 people die and another 35 are injured.
- English ruling in the arbitration for the Palena area.

== Births ==
- 11 February – Daniel Muñoz
- 14 February – Francisco Melo
- 13 April – Ivo Basay
- 14 June
  - Nelson Cossio
  - Eduardo Waghorn, musician
- 17 July – Omar Barrientos
- 27 August – Mónica Pérez
- 22 September – Nelson Tapia
- 8 October – Felipe Camiroaga (d. 2011)
- 16 December – Álvaro Escobar

== Deaths ==
- date unknown – Juan Antonio Iribarren (b. 1885)
