= Oscar Rojas =

Oscar Rojas may refer to:

- Óscar Rojas (Chilean footballer) (born 1958), Chilean football defender
- Óscar Rojas (Costa Rican footballer) (born 1979), Costa Rican football midfielder
- Óscar Rojas (footballer, born 1981) (born 1981), Mexican football manager and former right-back
- Óscar Rojas (footballer, born 1988), Mexican football assistant manager and former right-back
