= 1950 in Chile =

- Decades: 1930s; 1940s; 1950s; 1960s; 1970s
- See also: Other events of 1950; Timeline of Chilean history

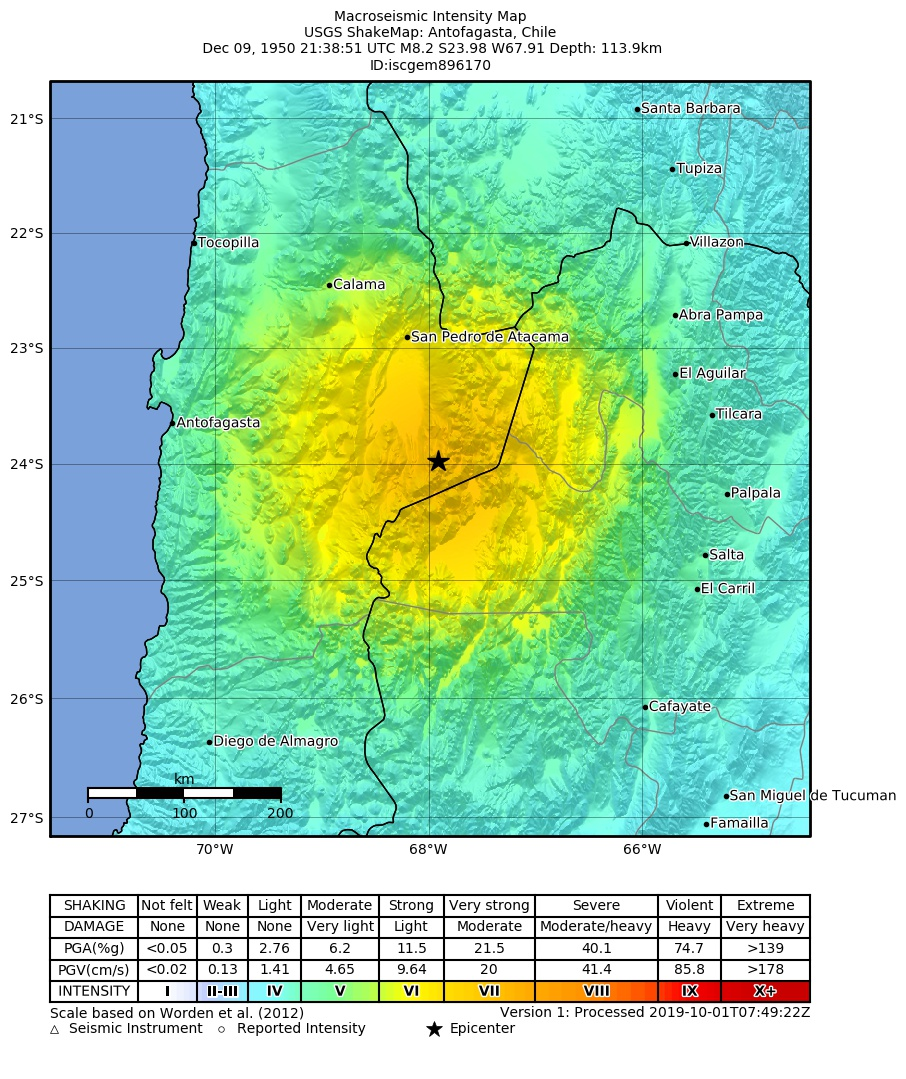
1950 Calama earthquake

The following lists events that happened during 1950 in Chile.

== Incumbents ==
- President of Chile: Gabriel González Videla

== Events ==
=== January ===
- 24 January – The Chilean Government orders troops to their garrisons in response to strikes.

=== March ===
- 18 March – The Chilean Government abolishes 'emergency zones' created around vital economic areas created in 1947 to deter strikes.

=== June ===
- 19 June – Empresa Nacional del Petróleo is created.

=== July ===
- 7 July - The newspaper La Tercera de La Hora, edited in Santiago and owned by Copesa, is founded.

=== December ===
- 9 December - An intraplate earthquake of magnitude 8.2 occurs inside the Department of Loa, near Calama
- 29 December – Admiral Carlos Torres accepts the transfer of USS Brooklyn and USS Nashville to the Chilean Navy under the Mutual Defense Assistance Act.

== Births ==
- 4 February – Teresita Reyes, actress (died 2025)
- 9 March – Jorge Marchant Lazcano, writer, playwright, screenwriter, novelist and journalist
- 21 March – Julio Crisosto, former footballer
- 24 April – Rafael González, former footballer
- 25 June – Paco Saval, keyboard player, producer, composer and singer
- 5 July – Carlos Caszely, former footballer
- 7 July – Mónica Briones, painter and sculptor (died 1984)
- 11 July – Hernán Rivera Letelier, novelist
- 14 July – Mario Osbén, former footballer (died 2021)
- 17 September – Patricia Maldonado Aravena, singer and television presenter
- 26 October – Jorge Socías, former footballer

== Deaths ==
- 27 January – Augusto d'Halmar, writer, art critic and diplomat (born 1882)
- 24 August – Arturo Alessandri, politician and the 18th and 22nd President of Chile (born 1868)
