= 1948 in Chile =

- Decades: 1920s; 1930s; 1940s; 1950s; 1960s
- See also: Other events of 1948; Timeline of Chilean history

The following lists events that happened during 1948 in Chile.

== Incumbents ==
- President of Chile: Gabriel González Videla

== Events ==
=== February ===
- 18 February - The Base General Bernardo O'Higgins Riquelme is inaugurated, one of the first of Chile in Antarctica.
- 25 February - The United Nations Economic and Social Council creates, under resolution 106 five regional economic commissions, whose objective is to help and collaborate with the governments of the respective territories in the investigation and analysis of regional and national economic issues. One of the five regional economic commissions was the Economic Commission for Latin America (in 1984 it was extended to the Caribbean), whose headquarters will be located in the city of Santiago.

=== September ===
- 3 September – The Law of Permanent Defense of Democracy banning the Communist Party of Chile is passed.

=== December ===
- 3 December - comes into force the Law of Permanent Defense of Democracy.

== Births ==
- 3 May – Mauricio Pesutic
- 12 July – Claudio Elgueta
- 23 August – Gastón Castro
- 6 October – José Piñera

== Deaths ==
- 25 February – Juan Esteban Montero (b. 1879)
