= 1952 in Chile =

- Decades: 1930s; 1940s; 1950s; 1960s; 1970s
- See also: Other events of 1952; Timeline of Chilean history

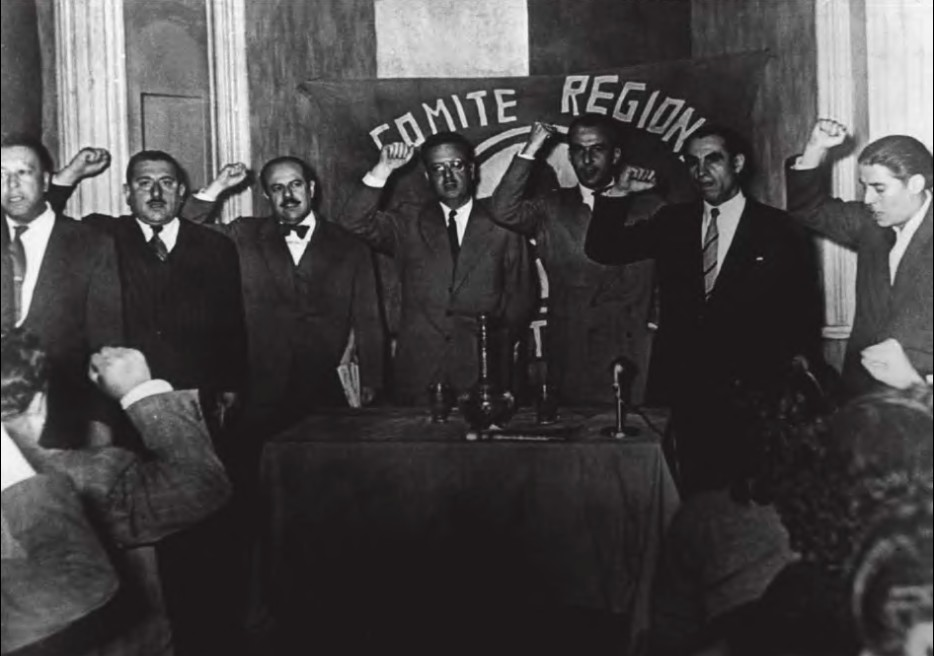
Presidential proclamation of Salvador Allende in the 1952 elections

The following lists events that happened during 1952 in Chile.

== Incumbents ==
- President of Chile: Gabriel González Videla (until 3 November), Carlos Ibáñez del Campo

== Events ==
=== January ===
- 3 January – Election violence begins in Chile when supporters of del Campo threw tear gas bombs into a theater where right-wing candidate Arturo Matte was addressing a meeting.
- 13 January – Foreign Minister Cristiano E. Irrarrazaval resigns.
- 26 January - The Paipote smelter is inaugurated, located in the Atacama Region

=== April ===
- 24 April - The National Statistics Institute (INE) carries out the XII National Population Census and the I Housing Census.

=== August ===
- 18 August - Alberto Hurtado SJ dies, priest of the Society of Jesus, apostle of Catholic trade unionism and charitable works, leader of Chilean Catholic Action, first doctor in Education, lecturer and author of numerous books, founder, among others, of the Faculty of Theology of the Pontifical Catholic University of Chile, of the Chilean Trade Union Action (ASICH), of the Revista Mensaje and of the Hogar de Cristo. Alberto Hurtado was canonized on October 23, 2005 by Benedict XVI.

=== September ===
- 4 September – Chilean presidential election, 1952

=== December ===
- 31 December - The first Trolleybuses in Valparaíso is inaugurated, a transportation system that continues to this day.

== Births ==
- 9 February – Gunther Uhlmann
- 21 April – Jorge Pizarro
- 10 October – Miguel Ángel Neira
- 21 November – Pedro Lemebel (d. 2015)
- 4 December – Álvaro Fillol
- 27 December – Álvaro Salas

== Deaths ==
- 18 August – Alberto Hurtado (b. 1901)
