= 1949 in Chile =

- Decades: 1920s; 1930s; 1940s; 1950s; 1960s
- See also: Other events of 1949; Timeline of Chilean history

The following lists events that happened during 1949 in Chile.

== Incumbents ==
- President of Chile: Gabriel González Videla

== Events ==
=== January ===
- 14 January - The law granting Chilean women the right to vote in parliamentary and presidential elections is published.

=== February ===
- 5 February - Chilean Army Captain Alberto Larraguibel breaks the high Jump world record with his horse Huaso, overcoming an obstacle of 2.47 meters.

=== March ===
- 6 March – Chilean parliamentary election, 1949

=== April ===
- 19 April - In the Araucania Region, an earthquake measuring 7.3 degrees on the Richter scale mainly affected the cities of Angol, Temuco and Los Angeles, leaving 35 dead, 155 injured and 2,065 homeless.

=== July ===
- 15 July – Chile dismisses two consuls in New York City because of alleged Communist ties.
- 16 July – Chile disenfranchises female Communist voters.

=== August ===
- 6 August - Condorito is published for the first time in Okey magazine.
- 16 August And 17 August - Demonstrations are held in Santiago due to the rise in public transport fares, known as the "Chaucha Revolution".

=== December ===
- 17 December – 1949 Tierra del Fuego earthquake

== Births ==
- 2 March – Antonio Vodanovic
- 25 March – Juan Carlos Latorre
- 13 August – Rogelio Farías (d. 1995)
- 20 November – Alejandro Pierola
- 1 December – Sebastián Piñera
- 4 December – Arturo Salah

== Deaths ==
- 24 May – Rosita Renard (b. 1894)
- date unknown – Adolfo Ibáñez Boggiano (b. 1880)
