= 1967 in Chile =

- Decades: 1940s; 1950s; 1960s; 1970s; 1980s
- See also: Other events of 1967; Timeline of Chilean history

The following lists events that happened during 1967 in Chile.

== Incumbents ==
- President of Chile: Eduardo Frei Montalva

== Events ==
=== January ===
- 17 January - The Senate denies President Eduardo Frei Montalva permission to visit the United States.
- 20 January - Decree 40 of the Ministry of Finance creates the Unidad de Fomento (UF) as a way of revaluing mortgage loans according to variations in inflation.

=== February ===
- 3-13 February - The eighth version of the Viña del Mar International Song Festival is held.
- 5 February - Folklorist Violeta Parra commits suicide in her tent in La Reina.
- 7 February - The funeral of the artist and folklorist Violeta Parra is held in the Santiago General Cemetery.
- 9 February - The Pudahuel airport is officially inaugurated, replacing Los Cerrillos airport.
- 21 February - Divisional General Ricardo Orellana Olate dies in Temuco, the last survivor of the War of the Pacific. He was born in Temuco. south of the country on May 20, 1860, and enlisted in the war as a cornet of orders.

=== March ===
- 13 March - earthquake at 12:06 (local time). The tremor has a magnitude of 7.3 on the Richter scale and a depth of 33 km.
- 16 March - A take-over is carried out in the current commune of Cerro Navia.

=== April ===
- 25 April - The Mendoza earthquake (Argentina) occurs. The earthquake is perceived in the cities of Illapel, La Ligua, San Felipe, Los Andes and Santiago (Puente Alto, San Bernardo, Quilicura, Peñalolén and Maipú).
- 29 April - Law 16625 is published, which allows the association of peasants.

=== June ===
- 17 June - Writer and journalist Ernesto Montenegro dies.

=== July ===
- The first edition of Paula magazine appears. The first issue is one hundred pages long and costs E°3.
- 1 July – Chile's armed forces seize control of post & telegraph offices in response to strikes.
- 14-24 July - As a result of the rain and low temperatures in the country, a heavy snowfall occurs between the cities of Ovalle and Punta Arenas.
- 28 July - Law 16640 on the Chilean Land Reform is published. Its basic criteria are: the incorporation of peasants to own the land they work on, the promotion of these and their families to achieve their incorporation into the social, cultural and political life of the nation; the improvement of agricultural productivity and the reform of the management system, among others.

=== August ===
- The musical ensemble Inti-Illimani is formed.
- August 7 - The zoologist and naturalist Guillermo Mann dies in Santiago.
- August 8 - A group of students seeking student reform takes over the Central House of the Pontifical Catholic University of Chile.
- August 11 - In the midst of the student takeover, the phrase «Chilean: El Mercurio lies » on a canvas hanging in the Central House of the Catholic University.
- August 23 - A power outage affects a large part of the country. Its cause is the fall of a pole in the Ictinos neighborhood of Peñalolén, currently Ñuñoa, which caused an overload and caused a blackout between the cities of Copiapó and Puerto Montt.
- August 31- The painter Jerónimo Costa dies in Santiago.

=== September ===
- September 5–22 miners die after two trucks carrying detonating material exploded in a sector of the Chuquicamata mine.
- September 10 - The writer, music critic and musicologist Vicente Salas Viu (was born in Madrid on January 22, 1911, and arrived in Chile in 1939 aboard the Winnipeg) dies in Santiago.
- September 11 - The Social Democratic Party is founded.—Legally recognized by the Directorate of the Electoral Registry on November 7.
- September 13–16 - Official visit of King Olaf V of Norway to Chile.
- September 27 - The sculptor Tótila Albert Schneider dies in Santiago.

=== October ===
- October 8 - The genealogist and historian Guillermo de la Cuadra Gormaz dies in Santiago.
- October 20 - A supreme decree creates the Army NCO School "Sergeant 2nd Daniel Rebolledo Sepúlveda".
- October 27 - dies in Montevideo (Uruguay) the writer Marta Brunet.

=== November ===
- November 7 - The Cerro Tololo Inter-American Observatory is inaugurated, located in Cerro Tololo (current Coquimbo Region), 80 km from La Serena.
- November 13 - The poet, painter and ambassador Diego Dublé Urrutia dies in Angol.
- November 16 - The Chilean representative Margarita Téllez ranks among the 15 semifinalists of the beauty contest Miss World that takes place at the Lyceum Theater in London.
- November 24–26 - The XXII Congress of the Socialist Party takes place in Chillán Between the approved text by the plenary, it is concluded that:

Revolutionary violence is inevitable and legitimate [..., and it is the only path that leads to the seizure of political and economic power and to its subsequent defense and strengthening. Only by destroying the bureaucratic and military apparatus of the bourgeois state can the socialist revolution be consolidated [...] The peaceful or legal forms of struggle (claiming, ideological, electoral, etc.) do not lead by themselves to power. The Socialist Party considers them as limited instruments of action, incorporated into the political process that leads us to armed struggle.

=== December ===
- December 4 - A volcanic eruption —which occurred on Deception Island, South Shetland Islands, in the Antarctic—destroys the President Pedro Aguirre Cerda Station and the Cabo Gutiérrez Vargas Shelter.
- December 12 - Decree 1534 of the Ministry of the Interior determines the national emblems of the country and regulates their use, consolidating and systematizing various legal and regulatory norms on the matter. Its 1st article establishes that the national emblems are "the Coat of Arms of the Republic, the National Flag, the Cockade or Cucarda and the Presidential Banner or Presidential National Flag."
- December 20 - The Tocopilla Earthquake affecting the cities of Tocopilla and Calama at 22:25 (local time). With a magnitude of 7.2 degrees on the Richter scale and an intensity of VII to VIII on the Mercalli scale, it leaves 10 dead, 40 injured and 1,150 homeless.

== Births ==
- 18 January – Iván Zamorano
- 3 March – Jaime Patricio Ramírez
- 20 March – Leonardo Farkas
- 11 May – Andrés Romero (Chilean footballer)
- 15 June – Lou Reuss
- 28 June – Daniel Jadue
- 29 August – Pablo Macaya
- 12 September – Beto Cuevas
- 20 September – Andrés Fontecilla
- 11 October – Mario Salas (footballer)
- 14 October – Uranía Haltenhoff
- 17 October – Pedro González Vera
- 24 October – Mauricio Bustamante
- 28 October – Carlos Bernardo Moreno

== Deaths ==
- 5 February – Violeta Parra (b. 1917)
