= 1957 in Chile =

- Decades: 1930s; 1940s; 1950s; 1960s; 1970s
- See also: Other events of 1957; Timeline of Chilean history

The following lists events that happened during 1957 in Chile.

== Incumbents ==
- President of Chile: Carlos Ibáñez del Campo

== Events ==
=== March ===
- 3 March – Chilean parliamentary election, 1957

=== April ===
- 2 April and 3 April - The so-called "battle of Santiago" takes place. Due to the economic crisis in the country, protests took place that left more than 20 dead and serious clashes with the police. In the last hours of April 3, President Carlos Ibáñez del Campo is forced to declare a state of siege and take the army out into the streets

=== July ===
- 24 July - Influenza outbreak in the port of Valparaíso. Between August and September it would expand to all of Chile.
- 28 July - Christian Democratic Party is founded.

=== October ===
- 5 October - In Valparaíso, UCV Televisión, the first Chilean television channel, begins its transmissions.

=== December ===
- 22 December – Two buses collide near San Antonio, killing 21.

== Births ==
- date unknown – Roberto Brodsky
- 3 January – Héctor Hoffens
- 13 July – Benedicto Villablanca
- 8 August – Roberto Rojas
- 25 August – Lizardo Garrido
- 2 November – Osvaldo Heriberto Hurtado Galeguillo
- 5 December – Raquel Argandoña
- 21 December – Roberto Cifuentes

== Deaths ==
- 10 January – Gabriela Mistral, poet (born 1889)
- 9 April – Pedro Opaso (born 1876)
- 12 May – Guillermo Saavedra (born 1903)
- 10 July – Ernesto Chaparro (born 1901)
- 25 September – Max Westenhöfer (born 1871)
