= 1961 in Chile =

- Decades: 1940s; 1950s; 1960s; 1970s; 1980s
- See also: Other events of 1961; Timeline of Chilean history

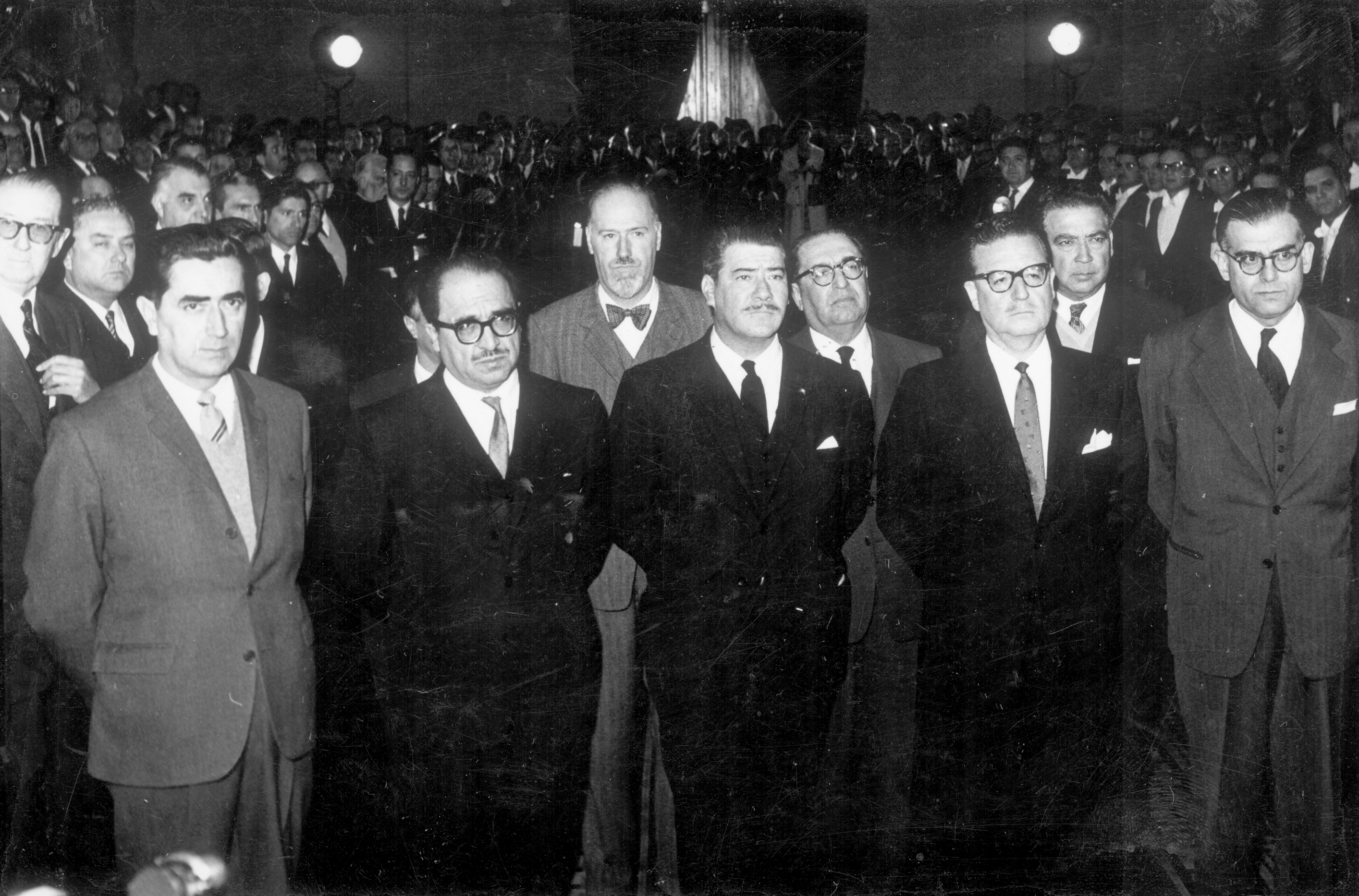

The following lists events that happened during 1961 in the Republic of Chile.

== Incumbents ==
- President of Chile: Jorge Alessandri

== Events ==
=== January ===
- 31 January - The latest edition of the newspapers El Amigo del País de Copiapó and El Noticiero Huasquino de Vallenar circulate.

=== February ===
- 3 February - The Estadio Municipal Nelson Oyarzún Arenas is inaugurated, located in the city of Chillán of the local team Ñublense.
- 11-21 February - The second version of the Viña del Mar International Song Festival is held.

=== March ===
- 5 March – Chilean parliamentary election, 1961, the Radical Party wins with 21.42% of the votes

=== April ===
- 3 April – LAN Chile Flight 210 crashes in the Andes The plane carrying the Club de Deportes Green Cross soccer team crashes in the Nevado de Longaví, Maule Region, killing all 24 people on board.
- 17 April - Funerals are held for those killed in the Green Cross tragedy.

=== June ===
- 24 June - Raúl Silva Henríquez takes office as Archbishop of Santiago in the Archdiocese of Santiago.

=== July ===
- July 11 - The commune of Antarctica is founded, in the current Magallanes Region

=== October ===
- October 18 - The transmissions of TV Bolívar begin in Concepción, the first private television channel in the country and which broadcast in closed circuit and by cable due to the restrictions imposed by the government preventing the appearance of commercial television channels through an open signal.

== Births ==
- 1 January – Andrea Tessa
- 9 January – Margot Kahl
- 20 January – Patricio Yáñez
- 24 January – Guido Girardi
- 31 January – Aldo Schiappacasse
- 26 April – José A. Santos
- 27 April – Mónica Regonesi
- 1 June – Rubén Espinoza
- 6 June – Tom Araya
- 1 July – Bastián Bodenhöfer
- 27 July – Harold Mayne-Nicholls
- 30 August – Leonel Contreras
- 17 September – Sergio Marchant (d. 2020)
- 29 September – Mariela Griffor
- 25 November – Ricardo Raineri
- 7 December – Pablo Simonetti
- 27 December – Fernando Díaz Seguel

== Deaths ==
- 25 May – Lenka Franulic (b. 1908)
