= Colectiva Lésbica Feminista Ayuquelén =

Chilean LGBT advocacy group

Colectiva Lésbica Feminista Ayuquelén (transl. Ayuquelén Lesbian Feminist Collective), sometimes called Ayuquelén, is a Chilean LGBT advocacy group. Founded in 1984, Ayuquelén was the sole political voice for LGBT people in Chile during the mid 1980s and in the period of Pinochet's dictatorship until the formation of Las Yeguas del Apocalipsis in 1988.

== History ==
The motivation for founding Ayuquelén was partly a reaction to the murder of Mónica Briones by a former friend and ex-detective based on her sexual orientation. Other reasons for its formation was to challenge compulsory heteronormativity in conservative Chile and feminine heterosexuality in Chile's feminist movement.

Discussions about forming a lesbian organization in Latin American countries started at the second Latin America and Caribbean Feminist Conference held in the outskirts of Lima, Peru. At the conference, a lesbian themed workshop was organized, in which Chilean Cecilia Riquelme met other lesbians who shared ideas about opening a discourse about lesbian rights within women's rights groups. At the workshop, many women came out publicly as lesbians while discussing ideas about forming organizations to bring visibility to the lesbian movement in the region. The organization known as the Lesbian Feminist Activist Group, Peru (GALF) was initiated as a result of the conference discussions.

In 1984, a group of women led by Cecilia Riquelme, Susana Peña and Carmen Ulloa formed Collectiva Lésbica Feminista Ayuquelén, the first forum for gay and lesbians in Chile. The organization went on to represent Chile's lesbian community in LGBT conferences and was a coordinator of the first conference of Lesbian Feminists of Latin America and the Caribbean.

Prior to 1987, Ayuquelén was a private group of lesbians within the women's movement. In 1987, some members of the group gave an interview stating their objectives to a Chilean magazine opposed to the military dictatorship of Pinochet. The interview was granted on the condition that their names will not be made public. After the interview became public, the group received death threats from members of the public.

In the beginning, the group was linked with the feminist movement in Chile during the mid-1980s; it contributed to the organization of workshops and raised awareness about gender equality. However, after the public interview, differences in viewpoints between Ayuquelén and another feminist group led to a separation of Ayuquelén from the dominant feminist group, La Morada. Thereafter, Ayuquelén went through a quiet period.

Recently, Ayuquelén is aligned with Lesbianas en Acción, another lesbian group. In 1992, both groups organized a joint lesbian conference.
