= 1947 in Chile =

- Decades: 1920s; 1930s; 1940s; 1950s; 1960s
- See also: Other events of 1947; Timeline of Chilean history

The following lists events that happened during 1947 in Chile.

== Incumbents ==
- President of Chile: Gabriel González Videla

== Events ==
=== February ===
- 6 February - The Captain Arturo Prat Base is inaugurated, the oldest in the country in Antarctica.

=== April ===
- 9 April - Through decree 1831 of 1947 of the Ministry of Education, the Universidad Técnica del Estado is created.

=== June ===
- 23 June - The President of the Republic Gabriel González Videla makes an official statement on maritime jurisdiction.

=== August ===
- 15 August – The Santiago Museum of Contemporary Art is inaugurated.

== Births ==
- 2 June – Juan Gabriel Valdés
- 28 July – Coco Legrand
- 21 September – Hernán Larraín
- 30 November – Patricia Verdugo (d. 2008)
- 30 November – Sergio Badilla Castillo
