= Crimson Hill =

Hill at Antarctica

Crimson Hill (62°57′S 60°36′W) is a prominent, ice-free hill, 95 metres (310 ft) high, on the south side of Pendulum Cove, Deception Island, in the South Shetland Islands. It was so named in 1829 by the British expedition under Foster, because there was a prominent stratum of brickstone in the hill.

== See also ==
- Crimson Hill Tunnel, Somerset, England. A tunnel on the disused Chard Canal
