= 1954 in Chile =

- Decades: 1930s; 1940s; 1950s; 1960s; 1970s
- See also: Other events of 1954; Timeline of Chilean history

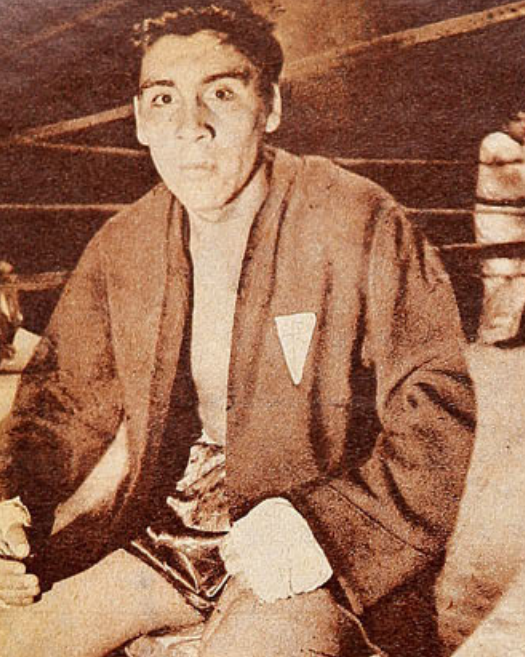
Alfredo Cornejo, light heavyweight champion of the 1954 Chilean Amateur National Championship

The following lists events that happened during 1954 in Chile.

== Incumbents ==
- President of Chile: Carlos Ibáñez del Campo

== Events ==
=== March ===
- 17 March - The young Argentine dancer Nélida Lobato performs at the theatre Bim-Bam-Bum in Santiago.

=== September ===
- 3 September – 50,000 workers in Chile strike, leading the government to threaten measures against the strikers.
- 21 September - Clarin is founded, edited in Santiago and directed by Darío Sainte Marie.

== Births ==
- date unknown – Humberto Nilo
- 14 January – Cecilia Morel
- 26 April – Sonia Tschorne
- 13 May – Jorge Garcés
- 7 June – Jaime Mañalich
- 13 June – Manuel Rojas (footballer)
- 30 June – Alastair MacGregor Martin
- 6 July – Francisco Reyes Morandé
- 9 August – Vladimir Bigorra
- 9 August – Kike Morandé
- 15 October – Miguel Piñera
- 22 October – Emilio Ulloa
- 3 November – Carlos Conca
- 14 November – Eliseo Salazar

== Deaths ==
- 28 January – Abraham Oyanedel (b. 1874)
- 15 May – Marmaduke Grove (b. 1878)
- 25 October – Manuel Trucco (b. 1875)
