= Pendulum Cove =

Cove of Deception Island, Antarctica

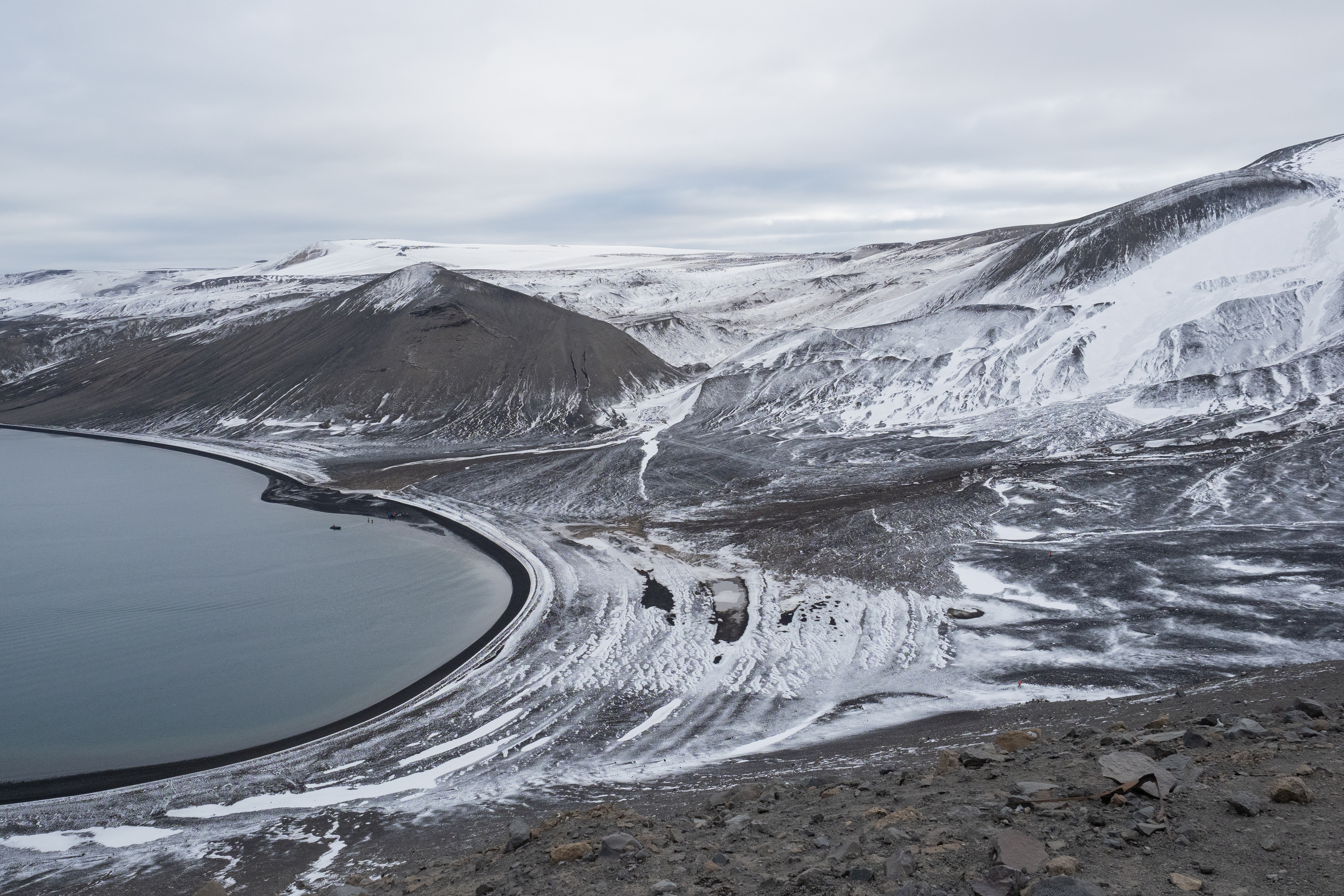
View over Pendulum Cove from Crimson Hill.

Pendulum Cove is a cove at the north-east side of Port Foster, Deception Island, in the South Shetland Islands of Antarctica. The name of the cove derives from the pendulum and magnetic observations made there by the British expedition under Henry Foster in 1829.

== Historic site ==
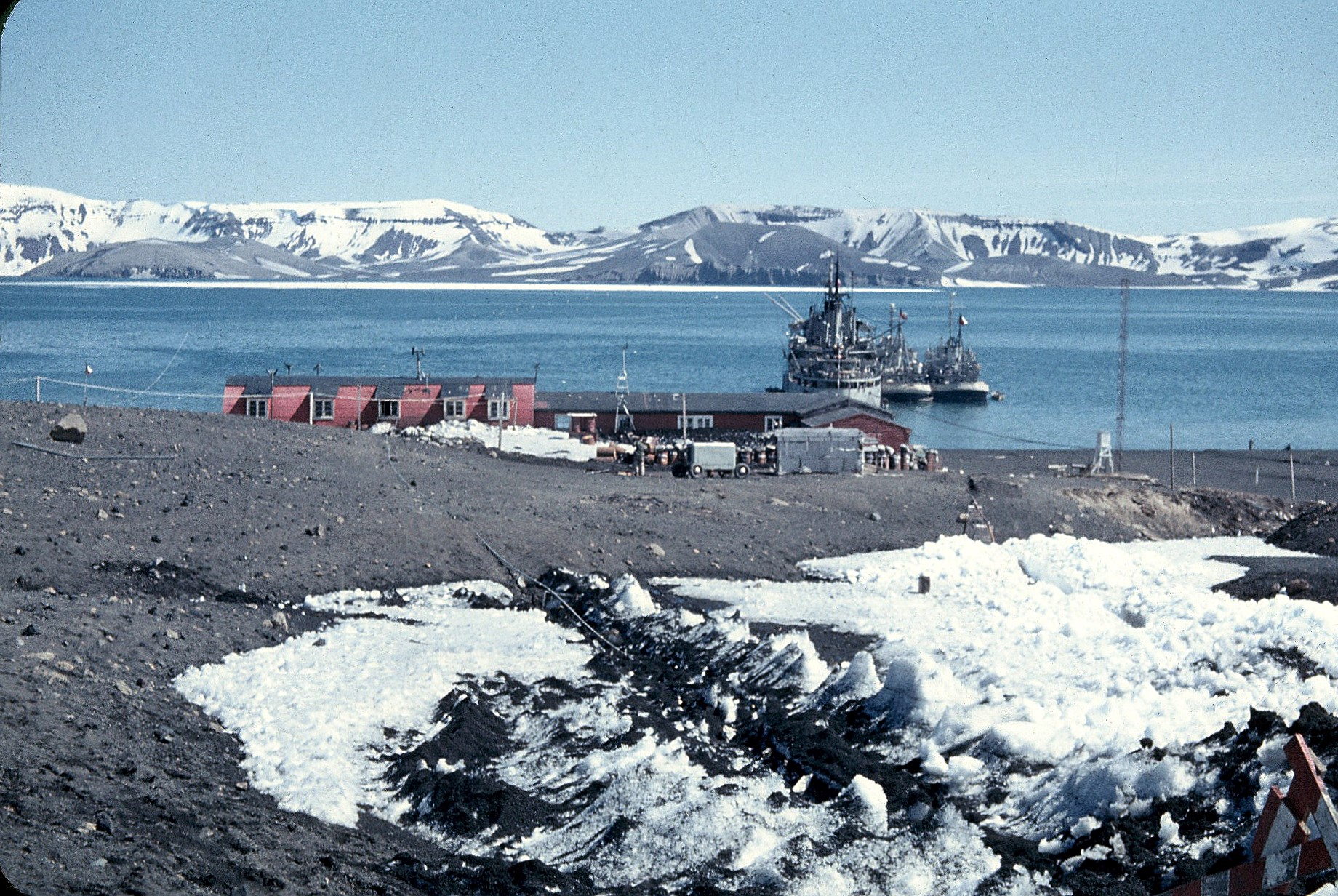
President Pedro Aguirre Cerda Station in January 1958.

President Pedro Aguirre Cerda Station, a Chilean meteorological and volcanological research station in Pendulum Cove, opened in February 1955. It was destroyed by volcanic eruptions in 1967 and 1969. Since 2001 the ruins of the station have been designated a Historic Site or Monument (HSM 76), following a proposal by Chile to the Antarctic Treaty Consultative Meeting.

== Caleta Péndulo Refuge ==
Cabral Refuge
- Refuge
- Location of Cabral Refuge in Antarctic Peninsula
- Coordinates: 63°50′45″S 58°22′34″W
- Country: Argentina
- Location in Antarctic Peninsula: Pendulum Cove; Deception Island; Antarctica
- Administered by: Argentine Navy
- Established: 1947
- Destroyed by volcanic eruption: 1967
- Type: Year-round

Caleta Péndulo Refuge was an Antarctic refuge located on the coast of Pendulum Cove, in Port Foster, Deception Island in the South Shetland Islands. The refuge was inaugurated on November 19, 1947, by the Argentine Navy. It was the first refuge built by the Argentine Armed Forces in Antarctica. The construction took place during the second Argentine Antarctic campaign in the summer of 1947–1948 in support of the construction of Deception Station, which was inaugurated on January 25, 1948, on the opposite side of the island.

Years later, in 1955 Chile installed the Pedro Aguirre Cerda Station a few hundred meters from the refuge. A volcanic eruption on December 4, 1967, devastated the Chilean base and the Argentine refuge. The name of the cove, which was also given to the refuge, recalls the magnetic observations made with pendulums in the place by the British expedition headed by Henry Foster in 1828.

== Antarctic Specially Protected Area ==
The cove forms part of an Antarctic Specially Protected Area (ASPA 140), comprising several separate sites on Deception Island, and designated as such primarily for its botanic and ecological values.

== See also ==
- Crimson Hill
- Relict Lake
- List of Antarctic field camps
