= 1963 in Chile =

- Decades: 1940s; 1950s; 1960s; 1970s; 1980s
- See also: Other events of 1963; Timeline of Chilean history

The following lists events that happened during 1963 in Chile.

== Incumbents ==
- President of Chile: Jorge Alessandri

== Events ==
=== January ===
- 1 January – The Deportes Ovalle football club is founded.

=== February ===
- The fourth version of the Viña del Mar International Song Festival takes place.

=== April ===
- 7 April - Municipal elections are held, which largely favored the Christian Democrats.
- 21 April - The first prize of Miss World Chile is given to Maria Pilar Aguirre Gómez.
- 30 April - The Jackal of Nahueltoro is murdered under Capital punishment, convicted of murdering his former partner and his five children (only hers).

=== May ===
- 6 May - an explosion of a cyclopropane cylinder in the San Borja Arriaran Hospital in Santiago caused the death of 6 people (2 surgeons, 2 patients and 2 anesthesiologists) and left another 2 surgeons and 12 assistants seriously injured.

=== July ===
- 3 July - The first edition of the Juan Pinto Duran Cup is held.

=== December ===
- 16 December - The statutes and regulations of Rugby in Chile, founded 10 years before, were made official.

== Births ==
- 16 January – Tomás Jocelyn-Holt
- 11 March – Hugo González
- 13 March – Aníbal González
- 24 March – Iván Morovic
- 25 March – Jaime Vera
- 21 April – Eduardo Vilches
- 23 April – Fernando Luis Capurro
- 29 July – Norma Yarrow
- 2 November – Daniel Farcas

== Deaths ==
- 8 December – Juana Rosa Aguirre (b. 1877)
