= Relict Lake =

- Location within Antarctica
- Location: Deception Island, South Shetland Islands, Antarctica
- Coordinates: 62°57′S 60°36′W
- Type: lake

Relict Lake is a small lake lying southeast of Pendulum Cove on Deception Island, in the South Shetland Islands. So named by the United Kingdom Antarctic Place-Names Committee (UK-APC) in 1957 because when Lieutenant E.N. Kendall made his survey of Deception Island in January–March 1829, Pendulum Cove extended inland to this lake, which has since been cut off from the sea.
