= 1951 in Chile =

- Decades: 1930s; 1940s; 1950s; 1960s; 1970s
- See also: Other events of 1951; Timeline of Chilean history

The following lists events that happened during 1951 in Chile.

== Incumbents ==
- President of Chile: Gabriel González Videla

== Events ==
=== January ===
- 16 January – The United States allocates $231,000 in Point Four funds for education projects in Chile.
- 18 January – 6,000 Chilean bakery, railroad and racetrack workers begin strikes.

=== February ===
- 14 February – 7,000 workers in Antofagasta strike in a demand for higher wages.
- 23 February – The Confederation of Non-Government Employees labor union strikes in solidarity with the Antofagasta workers. The government responds by alerting the military and seizing the bus system.

=== March ===
- 2 March – The Chilean government places the province of Antofagasta under military control as a result of the strikes.
- 18 March – Inez Enriquez Frodden is named as the first Chilean woman Deputy.

=== April ===
- 26 April - The National Association of the Press is founded, the largest association of newspaper and magazine publishing companies in the country.

=== November ===
- 13 November - In Chillán, the Cooperativa de Consumption de Energía Eléctrica de Chillán Ltda was created. Initially it was to regulate the supply of electricity, but today it is the largest company in the Ñuble Province.

== Births ==
- 7 March – Juan Machuca, footballer
- 21 June – Miguel Ángel Gamboa, footballer
- 10 August – Mario Galindo, footballer
- 21 August – Eric Goles, mathematician and computer scientist
- 29 September – Michelle Bachelet, politician, President of Chile
- 7 November – Guillermo Encina, golfer
- 10 November – Enzo Escobar, footballer

== Deaths ==
- 8 February – Ignacio Urrutia Manzano, politician, President of the Senate of Chile (b. 1879)
