= 1964 in Chile =

- Decades: 1940s; 1950s; 1960s; 1970s; 1980s
- See also: Other events of 1964; Timeline of Chilean history

The following lists events that happened during 1964 in Chile.

== Incumbents ==
- President of Chile: Jorge Alessandri (until 3 November), Eduardo Frei Montalva

== Events ==
=== February ===
- 14-23 February - the fifth version of the Viña del Mar International Song Festival is held.
- 19 February - the andacollo tragedy occurs, in which 7 miners were buried alive in the flor de té copper mine. later they would be rescued with the help of relatives and miners in the area.

=== March ===
- 2 March - a power cut of 9 hours and 36 minutes affects the northern part of the country, between the cities of Iquique and Copiapó.

=== August ===
- 4 August - through decree 2244 of 1964 of the ministry of justice, Rugby in chile takes legal personality.

=== September ===
- 4 September – is carried out the Chilean presidential election, 1964, giving Eduardo Frei Montalva as the winner with 1,409,012 votes.

=== November ===
- 3 November - Eduardo Frei Montalva assumes as president of the country for the period from November 3, 1964 to November 3, 1970.

== Births ==
- 2 March – Jaime Pizarro
- 12 March – Esteban Valenzuela
- 17 April – Luis Pérez Muñoz
- 24 May – Álvaro Rudolphy
- 14 November – Carlos Chandía
- 27 November – Rubén Martínez (footballer)
- 6 December – Jorge González (musician)

== Deaths ==
- date unknown – Guillermo Subiabre (b. 1903)
- 8 March – Enrique Molina Garmendia (b. 1871)
- 26 June – Eberardo Villalobos (b. 1908)
