= 1962 in Chile =

- Decades: 1940s; 1950s; 1960s; 1970s; 1980s
- See also: Other events of 1962; Timeline of Chilean history

The following lists events that happened during 1962 in Chile.

== Incumbents ==
- President of Chile: Jorge Alessandri

== Events ==
=== February ===
- The third edition of the Viña del Mar International Song Festival is held.

=== March ===
- 23 March - The Chilean land reform begins, which is developed until 1973

=== April ===
- 15 April - The Estadio Carlos Dittborn is inaugurated in the city of Arica.

=== May ===
- 15 May - The Floral clock of the city of Viña del Mar is inaugurated.
- 30 May-17 June – 1962 FIFA World Cup

=== June ===
- 2 June - The so-called Battle of Santiago occurs, where Chile faces Italy, Chile wins 2-0.

=== August ===
- 8 August - The Sunday Show program begins to be broadcast, which would later become Sábado Gigante, known worldwide in countries with Spanish-speaking people.

=== September ===
- 16 September - The Municipal Estadio Ester Roa Rebolledo is inaugurated in the city of Concepción.
- 18 September - The Chilean rodeo becomes a national sport.

== Births ==
- 12 February – Alberto Plaza, singer-songwriter
- 16 February – Alejandro Hisis, footballer
- 20 February – Klaus von Storch, aerospace engineer
- 21 February – Marco Antonio Figueroa, footballer
- 21 February – Ricardo Lagos Weber, politician
- 21 June – Víctor Hugo Castañeda, football manager
- 14 July – Patricio Toledo, footballer
- 17 July – Patricio Mardones, footballer
- 24 August – Manuel José Ossandón, politician
- 21 September – Fernando Larraín, actor
- 5 October – Juvenal Olmos, football manager
- 7 December – Solange Lackington, actress
- 12 December – Luis Gnecco, actor
- 28 December – Renato Munster, actor

== Deaths ==
- 14 March – Jorge González von Marées, politician and author (born 1900)
- Date unknown
  - Carlos de Rokha, poet and writer (b. 1920)
