= Alberto Arenas =

Chilean economist and politician

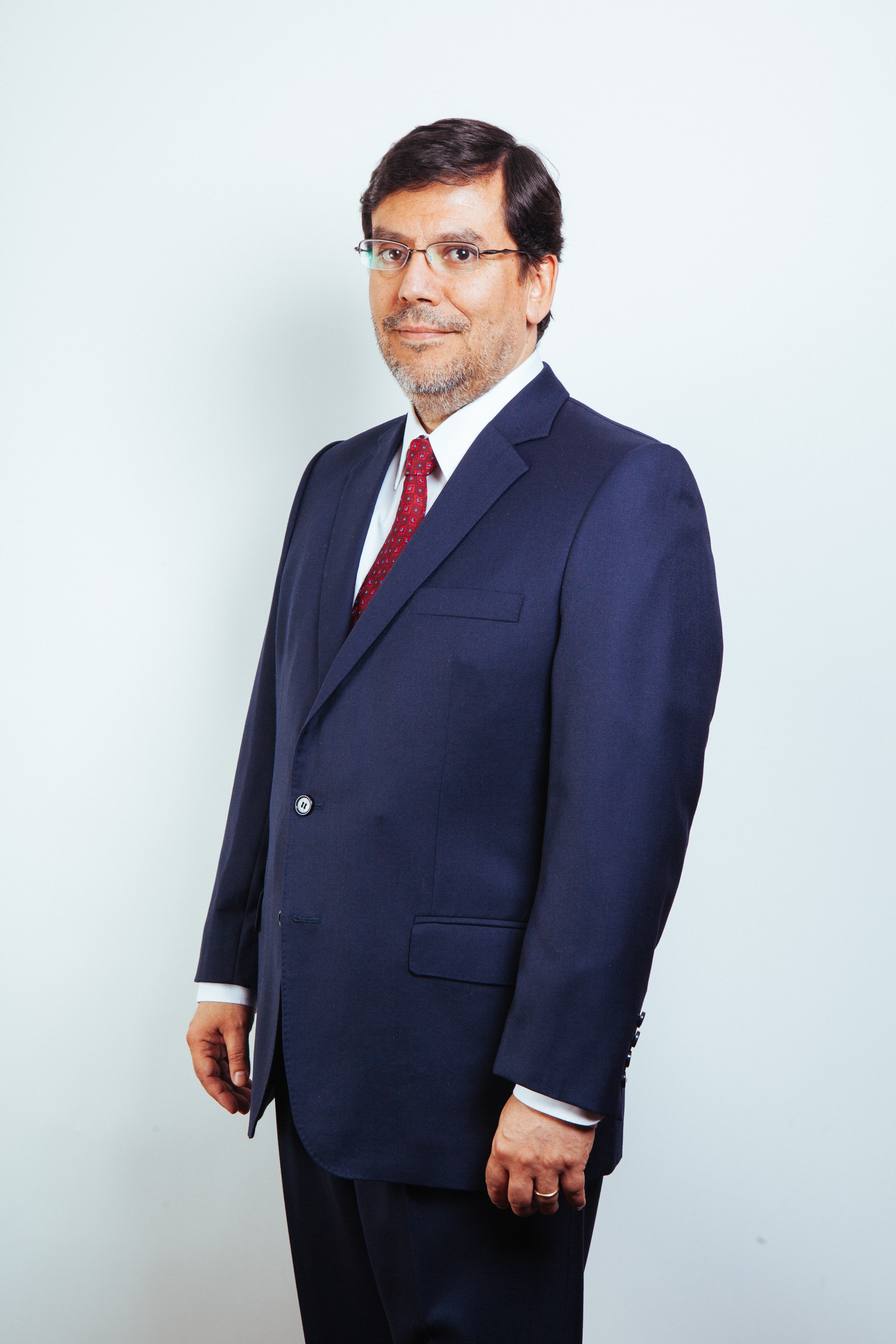

Minister of Finance
- In office 11 March 2014 – 11 May 2015
- President: Michelle Bachelet
- Preceded by: Felipe Larraín
- Succeeded by: Rodrigo Valdés

Head of Budget
- In office 11 March 2006 – 10 February 2010
- President: Michelle Bachelet
- Preceded by: Mario Marcel
- Succeeded by: Sergio Granados

Personal details
- Born: 5 October 1965 (age 60) Santiago, Chile
- Party: Socialist Party
- Spouse: Jacqueline Canales
- Children: Three
- Education: University of Chile; University of Pittsburgh

Alberto Arenas de Mesa (born 5 October 1965) is a Chilean economist, academic, and Socialist politician. He was Chile's Minister of Finance, under the second government of President Michelle Bachelet (2014–2015).

As a close collaborator of former president Bachelet, he served as Head of Budget during her first administration (2006–2010), as policy chief for her campaign in the 2013 Chilean presidential election, and as Minister of Finance during her second administration, a position he held from March 2014 to May 2015.

He was a part of the team of academics who published a paper on the Chilean Pension Reform, in August 2006.

== Family and education ==
Arenas was born on 5 October 1965, the son of architect and Communist activist Mario Alberto Arenas Pizarro and Mónica Eliana de Mesa. His paternal aunt, Adriana Arenas Pizarro, was married to French sociologist Alain Touraine.

He completed his primary education at the Liceo Experimental Manuel de Salas in Santiago. In 1983, shortly before graduating from secondary school, he joined the Communist Youth of Chile (JJCC), influenced by his father's political involvement.

He later studied economics at the University of Chile, where he served as vice president of his program's student council as a representative of the Popular Democratic Movement (MDP). During his university years, he participated in numerous demonstrations against the military dictatorship of Augusto Pinochet and was arrested on four occasions. In 1987, after the Communist Party of Chile endorsed armed struggle against the regime, he left the Communist Youth and joined the Socialist Party of Chile (PS).

He married Sara Jacqueline Canales Contreras, with whom he had three children.

== Professional career ==
In 1991, a year after graduating and following a brief period working in the research division of Banco Sud Americano, Arenas joined the Budget Office (Dipres) of the Ministry of Finance as an adviser. In 1993, he received a scholarship to study at the University of Pittsburgh in the United States, where he earned a PhD in economics with a dissertation entitled Learning from the Privatization of Chile's Social Security Pension System: Macroeconomic Effects, Lessons, and Challenges.

Upon returning to Chile in 1997, he was appointed head of the Studies Department of the Budget Office, and in 2000 became deputy director for Modernization and Civil Service Affairs within the same agency. During this period, he began working with Michelle Bachelet, then Minister of Health in the administration of President Ricardo Lagos.

Between 2000 and 2003, Arenas served on the board of the State Railways Company (EFE) during the Lagos administration. During this period, the Comptroller General's Office reported a number of irregularities within the company.

From 2010 to 2013, he served on the board of directors of Canal 13. At the same time, he worked as a researcher at the Microdata Center of the Department of Economics at the University of Chile.

He has also taught in the master's programme in economics jointly offered by Ilades/Georgetown University and the Alberto Hurtado University.
