= Eduardo Waghorn =

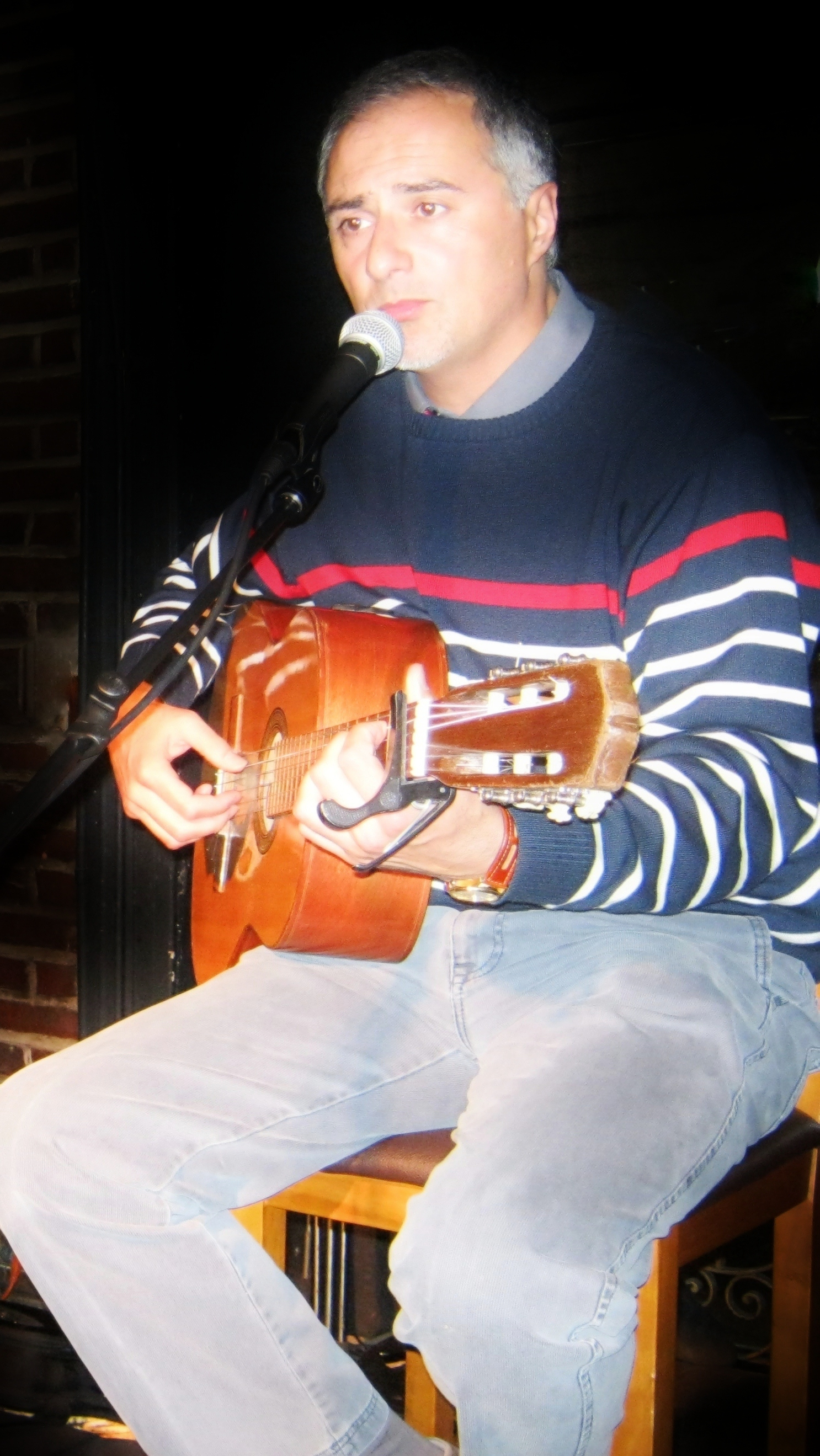

Background information
- Birth name: Eduardo Waghorn Halaby
- Born: 14 June 1966 (age 58); Santiago, Chile
- Genres: Trova, pop, folk
- Occupation(s): Musician, composer, songwriter, singer-songwriter
- Instrument(s): Singing, Spanish guitar
- Years active: 1984–present
- Website: Official site

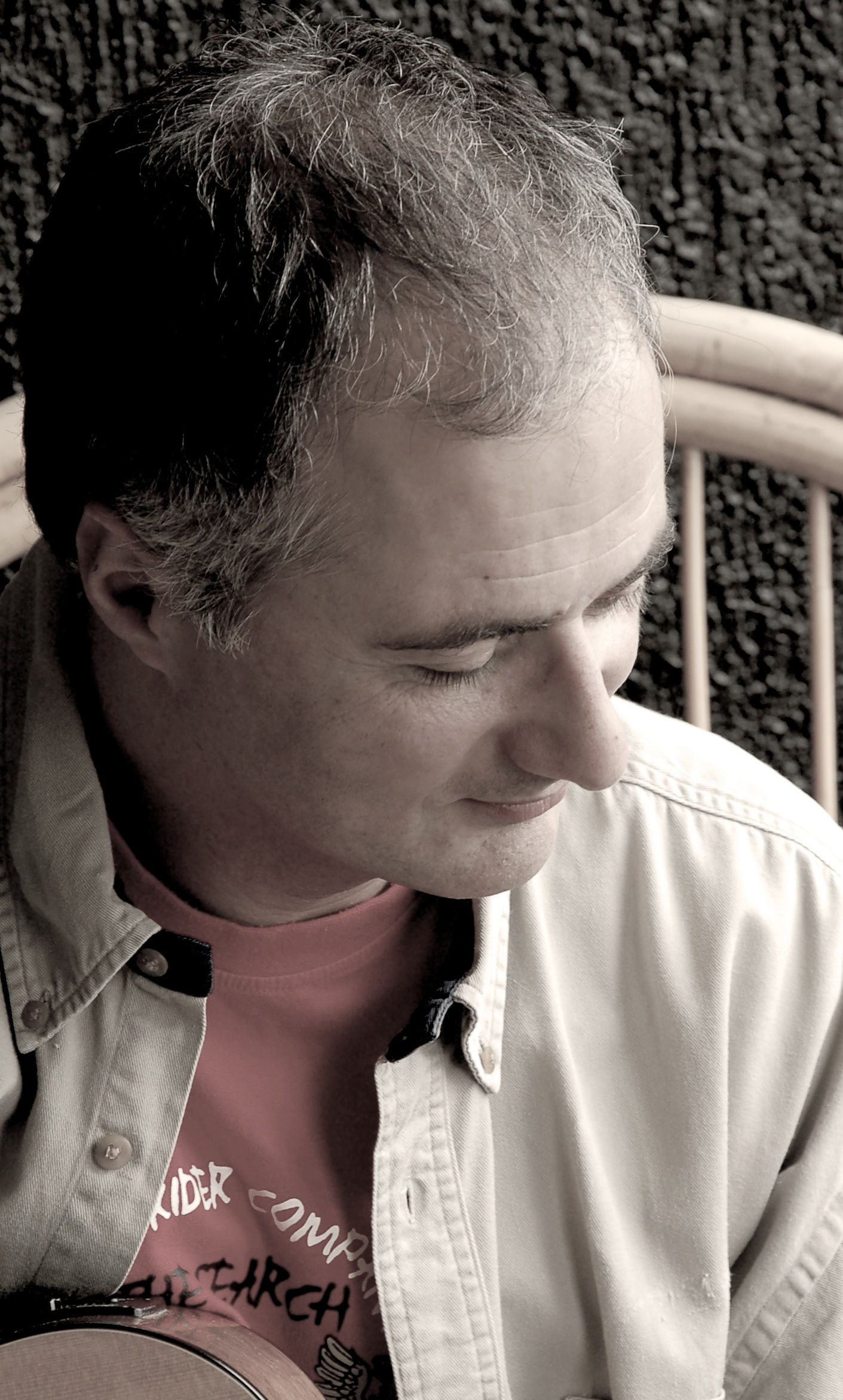
Eduardo Waghorn

Eduardo Waghorn Halaby (born 14 June 1966) is a Chilean musician, composer, singer-songwriter and lawyer, although he has also dabbled in poetry, drawing and advertising. He has written more than 500 songs. Waghorn defines his style as "a mix of trova, pop and folk".

== Biography ==
=== Early years ===
Waghorn was born in Santiago, and studied at the Liceo de Aplicación, a secondary school, where he was an active member of the choir. At age 12, he won a singing competition, representing his school on the television show "Hola Hola", hosted by Pablo Aguilera. In 1984, when he had not yet turned 18 and was a freshman studying law at the University of Valparaíso, he began composing his first songs. He participated in and won various festivals in the area, and also conducted several programs for the Valentín Letelier Radio, where he interviewed many young musicians. Additionally, he was the opening act for Sol y Medianoche, Hugo Moraga, Rudy Wiedmaier, Eduardo Peralta and Payo Grondona, among others.

=== Transfer to southern Chile and trip to Argentina ===
In 1988, Waghorn moved from Viña del Mar to live in the O'Higgins Region of Chile, working as a music teacher in several towns in the area: Santa Cruz, Peralillo, Población and Chépica. During that time, he composed such songs as Muñeco de Trapo, Si me hablaran las estrellas, Sobrevivo lentamente y Delia. In that year, he was in charge of two radio programs in Santa Cruz and Cauquenes, in the Maule Region. He also participated on the radio program Dimensión Latinoamericana at Valparaíso, hosted by Thelmo Aguilar.

In the early 1990s, he traveled to Argentina, where his music was broadcast by various provinces. Back in Chile, from 1991 he started recording several demos, to release his first album on the market. However, the project was postponed. A similar situation occurred with Sello Alerce record company in 1998. Finally, he collected some of his best known songs and recorded them on his first official album, Muñeco de Trapo (Rag Doll).

=== Muñeco de Trapo ===
This album consists of 11 songs, all recorded at Santuario Sónico and mastered at Tarkus. Upon completion, Muñeco de Trapo immediately began to receive airplay in Santiago and various cities, starting in November 2010.

In March 2011, Waghorn won second place in the Festival Virtual de la Voz (Virtual Voice Festival), held in Santiago, with his song "Muñeco de Trapo", the central theme of his self-titled album. In August 2011, his single "Sol" garnered more than 75,000 votes on the official website of Radio Uno, and his album was selected as "Album of the Day" by that radio station.

Between October 2011 and March 2012, his single "Sol" stayed in the top 30 of the program Dulce Patria de Radio Cooperativa. In January 2012, he played at the Viña del Mar International Song Festival with his song "Yo me quedo en cada cosa", edited with a more pop style, and arranged by composer Francisco Mendoza V. and national singer Eduardo Valenzuela.

In April 2012, he released his single, "12 de Agosto", which was produced by Valenzuela. In 2013, he was nominated for the Altazor Award, Musical Arts, with his song "Si me Hablaran las Estrellas", and arranged by composer Francisco Mendoza V. and honorable mention for "Best Pop Song". In 2014, he has also been newly nominated for the Altazor, this time for 12 de Agosto as "Best Pop Album or Ballad".

== Discography ==
=== Official ===
- 2011: Muñeco de Trapo
- 2012: 12 de Agosto
