= 1956 Santiago rail crash =

Railway incident in Chile

Details
- Date: February 14, 1956; 8:12 a.m
- Location: Santiago
- Country: Chile
- Line: Santiago - Cartagena
- Operator: Empresa de los Ferrocarriles del Estado
- Incident type: rear collision
- Cause: Signal passed at danger

Statistics
- Trains: 2
- Deaths: 23
- Injured: 198

The 1956 Santiago rail crash occurred on February 14, 1956, at 8:12 a.m. near the Chilean capital Santiago on the branch to Cartagena and killed 23 people.

Two trains left the capital twelve minutes apart, seven kilometres into their journeys, the second train ran into the back of the first; destroying a wooden, third-class carriage. Twenty-three people were killed and 198 injured. President Carlos Ibáñez del Campo ordered an immediate enquiry; the driver of the rear train was found to be at fault.

The accident happened just seven months after a very similar accident at San Bernardo twenty kilometers south of the city killed 38 people.

== Ghost train sightings ==
Several years after the accident, several Maipú residents started to report hearing something similar to a train horn, which seemed to come from the track nearby Avenida 5 de Abril, Most of them said that when they go outside, there is nothing. The train horn seems to be loud, as residents from other communes like Lo Espejo, Pudahuel, Quinta Normal and even Santiago Centro reported hearing the same noise.

== Sources ==
- Accidente de Queronque (in Spanish)
- Trenes sobre rieles: Tragedias en la via (in Spanish)
