= Nicolás Eyzaguirre =

Chilean economist and politician

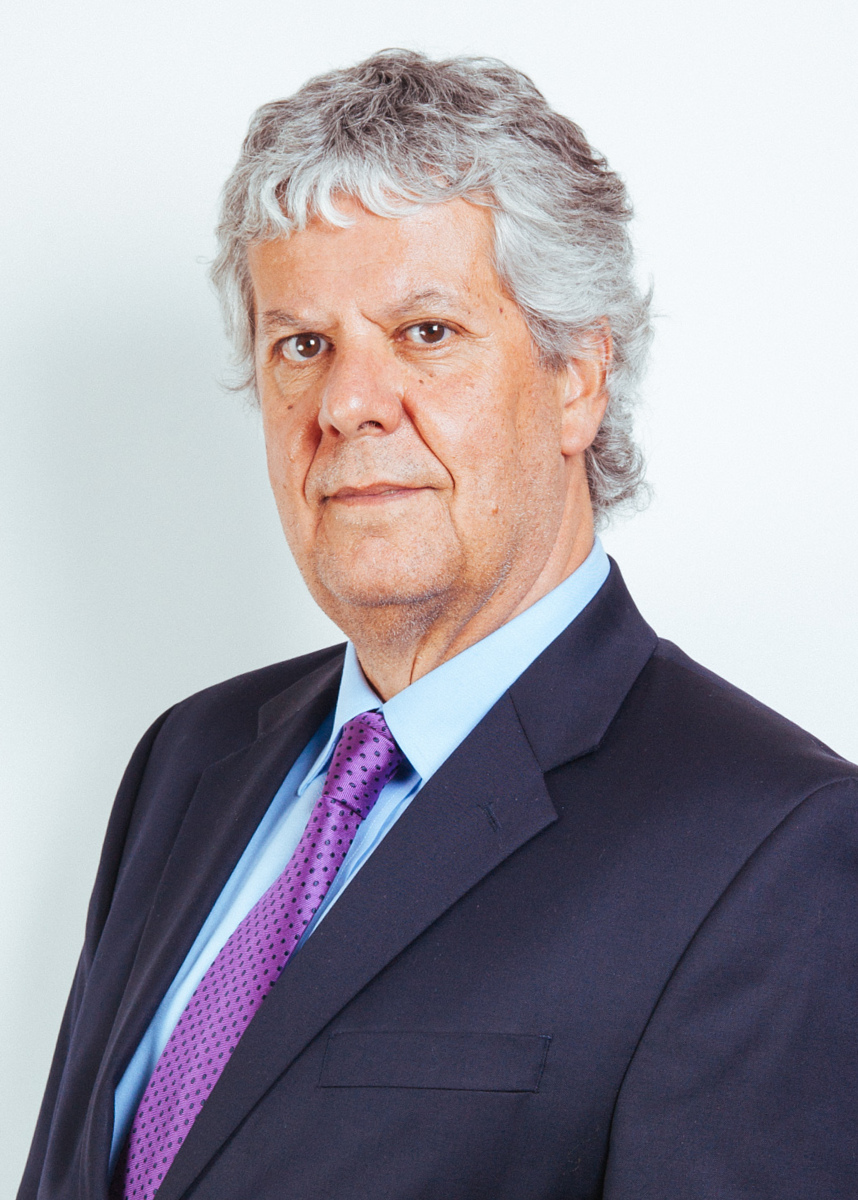
- Eyzaguirre in 2014

Minister of Finance
- In office 31 August 2017 – 11 March 2018
- President: Michelle Bachelet
- Preceded by: Rodrigo Valdés
- Succeeded by: Felipe Larraín
- In office 11 March 2000 – 11 March 2006
- President: Ricardo Lagos
- Preceded by: Manuel Marfán
- Succeeded by: Andrés Velasco

Minister General Secretariat of the Presidency
- In office 27 June 2015 – 31 August 2017
- President: Michelle Bachelet
- Preceded by: Patricia Silva Meléndez
- Succeeded by: Gabriel de la Fuente

Minister of Education
- In office 11 March 2014 – 27 June 2015
- President: Michelle Bachelet
- Preceded by: Carolina Schmidt
- Succeeded by: Adriana Delpiano

Personal details
- Born: 26 December 1952 (age 73) Santiago, Chile
- Party: Party for Democracy
- Spouse: Margarita Sánchez Muñoz
- Children: Two
- Parent: Delfina Guzmán
- Education: University of Chile; Harvard University (Ph.D.)
- Occupation: Politician
- Profession: Economist

Nicolás Eyzaguirre Guzmán (born 3 January 1953 in Santiago) is a Chilean economist, and the former Minister of Education of his country.

Previously, he was Chile's Minister of Finance between 2000 and 2006. He is the son of architect Joaquín Eyzaguirre and actress Delfina Guzmán.

== Early life and studies ==
Eyzaguirre received his secondary education at the elite Colegio Verbo Divino private school. A music enthusiast, at the age of 15 he was admitted to the University of Chile Conservatory to study classical guitar, being lured by the Nueva canción movement. With his brother, Joaquín, he was part was of the folk group Aquelarre, playing titles such as, El cautivo de Tiltil and Valparaíso.

Eyzaguirre began his career in politics as a member of the Christian Democrat Party, and then migrated to the Christian Left Party and then to the Communist Party, where he stayed until his departure to the United States. He graduated as a Commercial Engineer with a mention in economics at the University of Chile, and obtained his master's degree in economics from the same university, specializing in economic development.

== Career ==
=== Rising as scholar ===
Later, he traveled to the United States to obtain a doctorate in macroeconomics and international trade from the Harvard University, which he never completed. Eyzaguirre changed his view of economics during his time at Harvard. He later admitted to having been mistaken in his Communist ideology, and that adopting the principles of the free market was more sound and rational.

Back in Chile, Eyzaguirre became acquainted with and befriended Ricardo Lagos, with whom he later joined the Party for Democracy, his current party affiliation.

Between 1984 and 1985, he worked as an international consultant and adviser to the International Monetary Fund. Later, between 1985 and 1990, he worked as an expert in Monetary and Financial Policy for Latin America at CEPAL. After the return of democracy, he performed senior roles at the Central Bank of Chile between 1990 and 1997, occupying the positions of Director of Research and Chief Economist.

=== Political career ===
On 11 March 2000, he took the oath as Minister of Finance in the government of Ricardo Lagos. The Lagos government's policy was to perpetuate and perfect Chile's free market economy by drawing lessons for the Asian crisis, which had left Chile with persistently high unemployment and low growth. It balanced the fiscal accounts and implemented a fiscal rule based on the structural balance, which strengthened the fiscal position and contributed to inflation reaching historical lows. The increased macroeconomic stability fostered a return to better economic performance, with growth reaching 6% by 2004. Eyzaguirre's six-year term makes him the longest-serving Minister of Finance in the history of Chile.

Under his tenure the state owned mining company, Codelco, closed copper forward trades with the Chinese government. Those transactions generated losses of almost US$5.0 bn for the Chilean government. The internal revenue service of Chile (SII) questioned de operations because copper was sold at an average of usd1,16 per pound, while in the London Exchange was trading at US$3,87.

== Views on economics and political positions ==
The concept of extractivism has been criticized by Eyzaguirre, who cites the mining sector of Australia as a successful example of a "deep and sophisticated value chain", with high human capital, self-produced machinery and associated top-tier scientific research. For the case of Chile Eyzaguirre argue that rentierism and not extractivism should be concept of concern.

Eyzaguirre supported the proposed new political constitution in the 2022 Chilean national plebiscite.
