= Unique National Role =

Chilean identifier

The Unique National Role (RUN) is a unique identification number given to every Chilean, resident or not in Chile, and any foreigner who remains, temporarily or permanently, with a visa other than the tourist visa in Chile. It was implemented in 1973.

The agency in charge of granting the RUN is the Civil Registry and Identification Service, which grants it to those born in Chile at the time of registration of a birth. In all other cases, the RUN is granted at the time of requesting an identity card, a document of compulsory carriage for those over 18 years of age. The RUN was, until September 2013, the same as the Chilean passport number.

The RUN is given in increasing order, therefore a person with a lower RUN is generally older, since most RUNs are given at birth.

Legal persons – such as companies, international organizations, tax offices, NGOs, etc. – have a similar identification number, the Unique Tax Form (RUT), which is assigned by the Internal Revenue Service (SII) upon request. The RUN is also the Unique Tax Role of natural persons.

The RUN and the RUT consist of two parts separated by a hyphen: the correlative number and the verifying digit or DV. The DV consists of a digit that goes from 0 to 9 or the letter K, which is obtained from the correlative via an algorithm. The DV validates the RUN or RUT, since this number can have only one verifying digit; this way mistakes in typing and deception are avoided.

Normally, both the RUN and the RUT use separator points of thousands, so they obey the following format: XX.XXX.XXX-Y, where X is a digit and Y is a digit or the letter K.
