= Carlos Ramos (footballer, born 1958) =

Chilean footballer

Personal information
- Full name: Carlos Humberto Ramos Rivera
- Date of birth: 29 April 1958 (age 68)
- Position: Striker

Senior career*
Years	Team	Apps	(Gls)
- Universidad de Chile
- * Club domestic league appearances and goals

Carlos Humberto Ramos Rivera (born 29 April 1958) is a Chilean former footballer.
