= Mónica Briones =

Chilean painter and sculptor

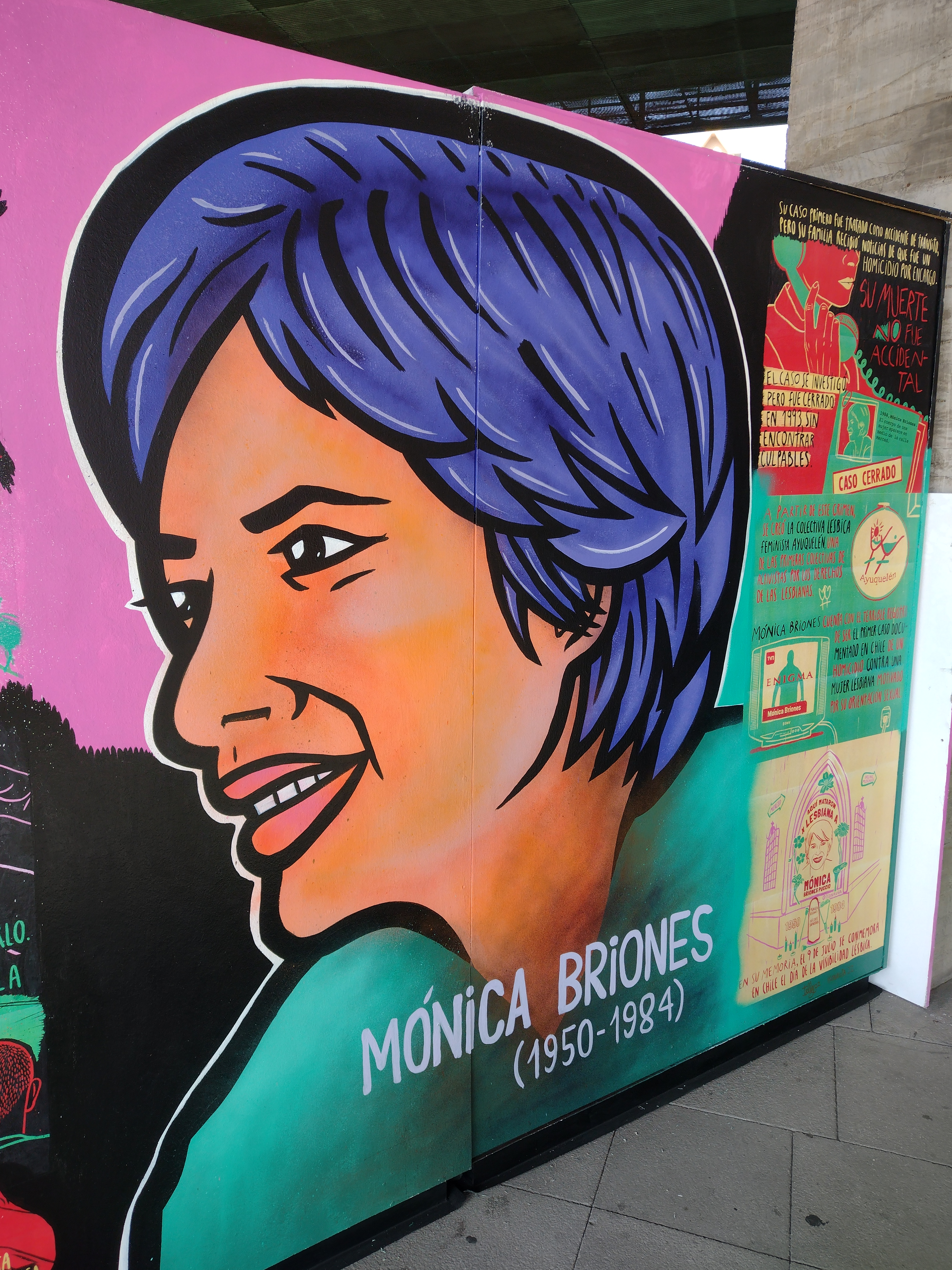
- Born: 7 July 1950; Santiago de Chile
- Died: 9 July 1984 (aged 34); Santiago de Chile
- Cause of death: Lesbophobic hate crime
- Occupation: Visual Artist

Mónica Angélica Briones Puccio (Santiago de Chile, 7 July 1950 – 9 July 1984) was a Chilean painter and sculptor. Her murder during the military dictatorship is considered the first documented case of a lesbophobic hate crime in Chile, and it inspired the formation of the first lesbian group in her country, Colectiva Lésbica Ayuquelén, as well as the establishment of Lesbian Visibility Day, which has been commemorated every July 9 since 2015 in Chile.

== Biography ==
The daughter of an artisan and a dressmaker, Briones studied at the University of Chile's School of Arts in the late 1960s, where she was taught by the well known visual artist, Nemesio Antúnez. She won a painting contest at Santa Lucía Hill, which consisted of painting for more than 72 hours continuously. She used to sell her artwork at Parque Forestal.

Early on the morning of July 9, 1984, after leaving the Jaque Mate bar in Downtown Santiago, Mónica and her friend Gloria del Villar were waiting for a bus near Plaza Italia Square, when they were approached by a "tall man with blond hair, green eyes, with a military haircut and appearance,” who proceeded to grab Briones by the neck, push her while insulting her for being a lesbian and beating her against the pavement. His attack had been so brutal that he fractured her skull. Gloria ran away in a state of shock, looking for help, while the assailant fled the scene.

According to the police report, her death occurred at 6:20 am on Saturday, July 9, "after the victim had been run over by a vehicle in a hit-and-run." The autopsy performed by the Legal Medical Service was at the direction of thanatologist América González Figueroa, who concluded that Briones had been involved in a car accident which had caused her "facial cranioencephalic trauma." Her wake was held at the Capilla Nazareno de Providencia, after which her body was cremated and her ashes scattered on Horcón Beach.

== Criminal Investigation ==
The cause of death for Mónica Briones was opened in 1985, when her father filed a complaint for a near misdemeanor of homicide. In the early 1990s, Alfredo Etcheberry, the lawyer who represented the family in the ad honorem case, dedicated himself to questioning all the contacts that Mónica had noted in an address book that was in her possession at the time of her death, and which he had recently been able to recover. Another line of his investigation resulted from the fact that Mónica's attacker had been hired. At the time, she would have been involved in a sentimental and extramarital relationship with a married woman named Natalia, who was married to an agent of the National Information Center (Chile).

The judicial libel had been in the former Criminal Courts for almost 10 years, and despite Etcheberry's attempts to continue the investigation, the case was closed definitively in September 1995. The court declared that "there is not enough evidence to charge the particular person as an author, accomplice or accessory."

== Repercussions ==
Following her brutal murder, the figure of Mónica Briones has become a source of inspiration in promoting the fight for lesbian rights. Her story has inspired several television features, a chronicle written by Pedro Lemebel, plays and Enigma, a film directed by Ignacio Juricic that focuses the events that followed her death.

After her murder, the Ayuquelén organization was formed. It was the first conglomerate of lesbian women who came together in order to fight for their rights and to claim the death of Briones as the first documented lesbophobic crime in Chile, one which had been in existence for 15 years. Lesbian Visibility Day is commemorated in Chile on July 9 each year, the anniversary of her murder. In 2019, lesbian feminist groups formally requested the National Monuments Council to install a memorial at the site of her murder (the intersection of Merced and Irene Morales streets in Santiago), where it reads “in memory of all the lesbian women attacked, raped or murdered for their sexual orientation and/or gender identity.”
