= Aguirre Cerda Research Station =

Aguirre Cerda Base Presidente Pedro Aguirre Cerda
- Antarctic research station
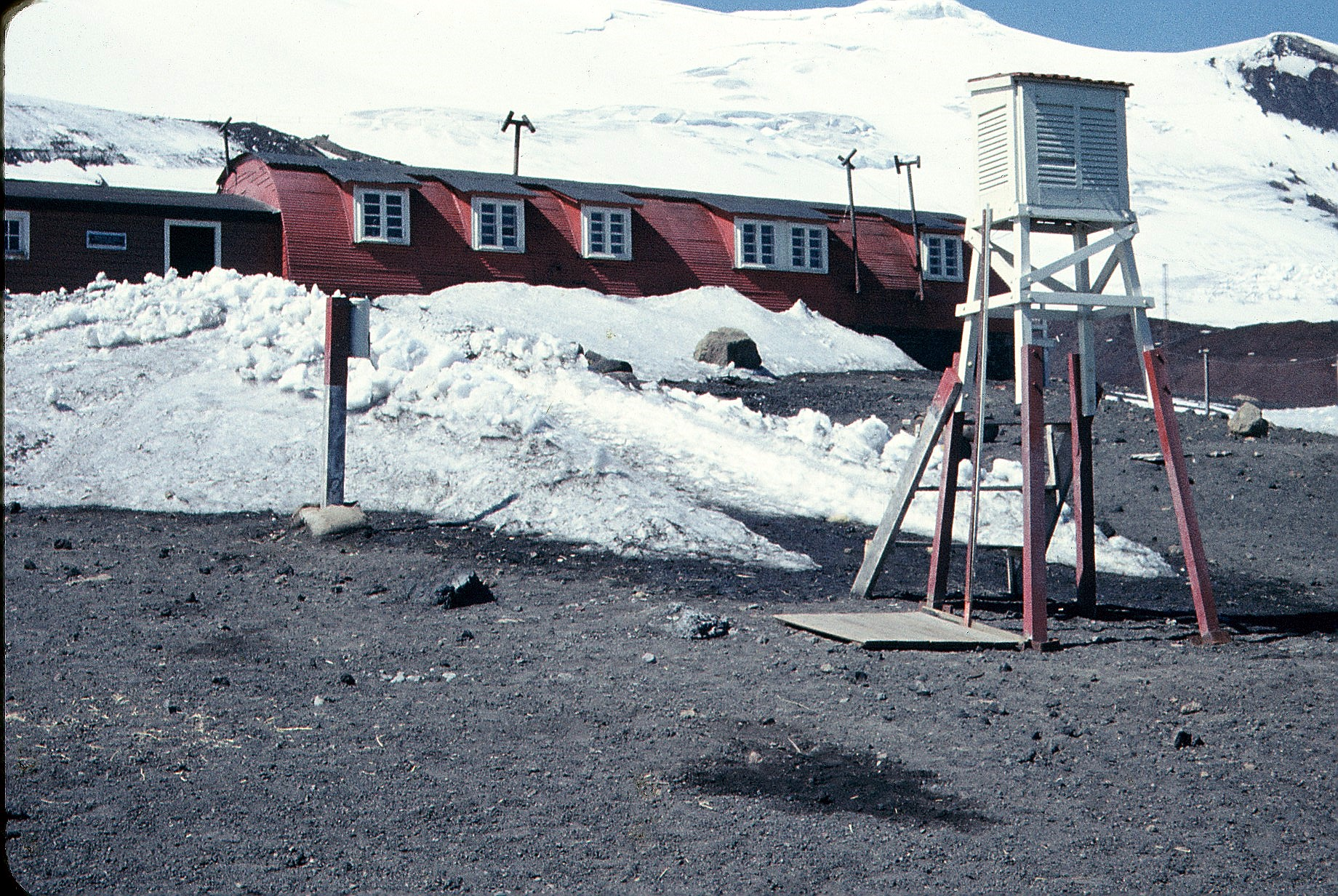
- The base

- Location in Antarctica
- Coordinates: 62°56′01″S 60°35′45″W
- Region: South Shetland Islands
- Location: Deception Island
- Established: 12 February 1955
- Destroyed: 4 December 1967
- Named after: Pedro Aguirre Cerda

Government
  - Type: Administration
  - Body: Instituto Antártico Chileno

Population
  - Total: 16
- Active times: All year-round

President Pedro Aguirre Cerda Station was a Chilean Antarctic base, located at Pendulum Cove in Deception Island in the South Shetland Islands, inaugurated in 1955. The same year, the Falkland Islands and Dependencies Aerial Survey Expedition was established at Deception Island to help the survey of the Antarctic Peninsula, operating aircraft from Hunting Aerosurveys Ltd.

== History ==
The Station was inaugurated on February 12, 1955, by the Defence Minister of Chile Tobías Barros Ortiz, when at that time the Commodore Jorge Gándara was in charge of the Chilean Air Force. The base was first designated with the name of the then President Carlos Ibáñez del Campo, but after the inauguration received the name of the former president Pedro Aguirre Cerda, in gratitude to his disposal of the decree that defined the Chilean Antarctic Territory in 1940.

The research was carried out on volcanology, climatology and meteorology. Since 1965, a weather office was in operation in order to elaborate national and international meteorological forecasts.

The base operation ended violently and definitively on December 4, 1967, when a volcanic eruption destroyed it. It was abandoned, evacuating the 16 men who made up its endowment. New volcanic eruptions in 1969 and 1970 affected again the structures of the base. The ruins of the base, including its meteorological and volcanological center, were declared in 2001 as Historic Sites and Monuments in Antarctica N° 76 under the Antarctic Treaty System, on the proposal and preservation of Chile.

== Gutiérrez Vargas Refuge ==
The Gutiérrez Vargas Refuge, so called in memory of the aviation Captain who died on December 30, 1955, was located at 1 kilometre (0.62 mi) from Aguirre Cerda Station and was inaugurated on February 12, 1956. Its purpose was to serve as a refuge for the members of the Station in the case of fire.

On December 4, 1967, the refuge was definitively abandoned, as was the Aguirre Cerda Station, due to a violent volcanic eruption. The poor remains of the refuge structure can still be seen on the beach where it was located.

== See also ==
- List of Antarctic research stations
- List of Antarctic field camps
