= Sergio Pacheco =

Chilean footballer (born 1959)

Personal information
- Full name: Sergio Antonio Pacheco Reyes
- Date of birth: 30 July 1959 (age 67)
- Position: Midfielder

Senior career*
Years	Team	Apps	(Gls)
- Deportes Naval
- * Club domestic league appearances and goals

Sergio Antonio Pacheco Reyes (born 30 July 1959) is a Chilean former footballer. He was called up to the Chile Olympic football team for the 1984 Summer Olympics.
