= Luis Hormazábal =

Chilean footballer (born 1959)

Personal information
- Full name: Luis Orlando Hormazábal Gavilán
- Date of birth: 13 February 1959 (age 67)
- Place of birth: Santiago, Chile
- Position: Defender

Senior career*
Years	Team	Apps	(Gls)
1977–1989	Colo-Colo	188	(5)

International career
1984–1987	Chile	22	(0)
- * Club domestic league appearances and goals

Luis Orlando Hormazábal Gavilán (born February 13, 1959, in Santiago, Chile) is a former Chilean footballer who played for Colo-Colo. He played as a defender.

== Titles ==
- Colo-Colo 1977, 1979, 1981, 1983, 1986 and 1989 (Chilean Primera División Championship), 1981, 1982, 1985, 1988 and 1989 (Copa Chile)
