= Paulina Nin de Cardona =

Chilean television presenter

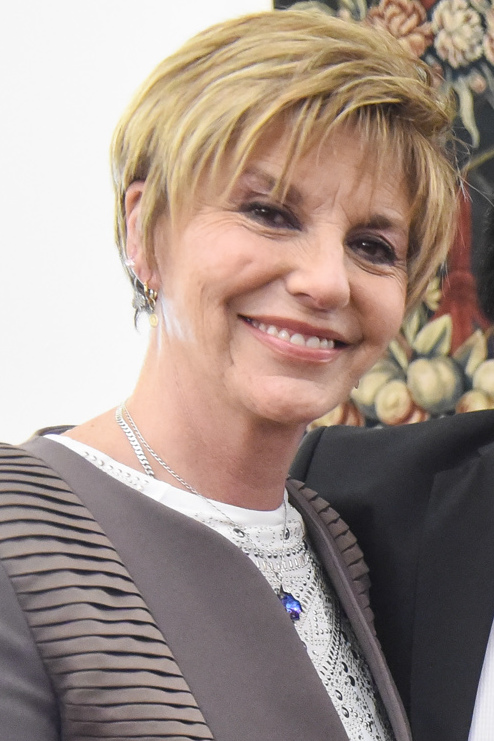
Paulina Nin de Cardona Muñoz

Paulina Nin de Cardona Muñoz (born August 2, 1960) is a Chilean television presenter, announcer, and business woman.

Nin de Cardona studied elementary education at the Pontifical Catholic University of Chile.

Her first television role was hosting short segments on "Super Hockey" for Televisión Nacional (TVN) which gave her an opportunity to work in children's programming. She then worked at the news program 60 Minutos.

In 1999 she began working with Canal 13 to create a morning show. Because of switching networks Nin de Cardona was sued for breach of contract. The show, "La mañana del Trece", began airing in January 1999. One of the most memorable parts of her hosting was bringing her dog "Cosita" onto the show. She partnered with a women's prison to have the inmates manufacture plush toy black dogs which were then given as gifts. During her time as host she had a span of three years with an ileostomy.

She has her own production company, Nin-Genovesi Televisión. It produced her show "Paulina y..." which was an interview program.

In 2004, Nin de Cardona was one of seven candidates for Mayor of Pichilemu. She only received 4.4% of the votes. While running for office, she and her campaign manager, fiancee Alfredo Zúñiga, were subject to multiple legal charges which she felt were politically motivated.

Nin de Cardona was honored by the government in 2018 and 2019 for her role as a communication professional.

== Personal life ==
In 1982, Nin de Cardona married businessman Canuto Errázuriz Gibson. They had two children, Canuto and Paulina. They decided to separate in 1996 and officially dissolved the marriage in 2004.

She was in a relationship with journalist Giancarlo Petaccia between 1999 and 2002. She then began a relationship with businessman Alfredo Zúñiga whom she married in 2005.
