= San Bernardo train crash =

1955 railway incident in Chile

Coordinates: 33°35′39″S 70°41′52″W

Details
- Date: July 17, 1955; 8:55 AM
- Location: San Bernardo
- Country: Chile
- Operator: EFE
- Incident type: rear collision
- Cause: Signal passed at danger

Statistics
- Trains: 2
- Deaths: 38
- Injured: 58

The San Bernardo train crash was a fatal rail crash that happened on July 17, 1955 at San Bernardo, a suburb on the southern edge of Santiago, the capital of Chile, killing 38 passengers. It was the worst rail disaster in Chilean history until the rail disaster at Queronque in 1986 which killed 58.

The accident happened at 8:55 AM in dense fog on a Sunday morning. Train No.3 was held at San Bernardo station waiting for a freight train ahead of it to clear the line. It comprised two first class coaches, a dining car, and five third-class coaches. After a delay of twenty minutes it was given the signal to proceed on its journey south to San Rosendo. But at that same moment it was rammed from behind by Train No.11 bound for Pichilemu destroying the two rear third-class carriages and killing most of the occupants. The impact was so great that a block from the crash site fragments of debris and human remains could be found.

Survivors said the disaster could have been much worse as many passengers, bored by the long wait, had alighted from the train and were waiting on the platform. It was also fortunate that the rear two carriages contained many traders with large packages and baskets meaning that these carriages held fewer passengers than those further forward. President Carlos Ibáñez del Campo visited the scene later that morning.

According to the official report 38 people were killed and over 58 wounded, although other sources put the death toll at 49 or even 70 dead.

The driver of No.11 claimed that the signals were green on his approach to the station, but the subsequent enquiry found no fault with the signals, furthermore if they were obscured then the regulations state that he should have stopped his train as a preventative measure.

Seven months after the crash at San Bernardo a very similar accident occurred near Santiago which killed 23 and injured 198. Again, one train ran into the rear of another in thick fog with the driver of the rear train at fault.
