= Mauricio Redolés =

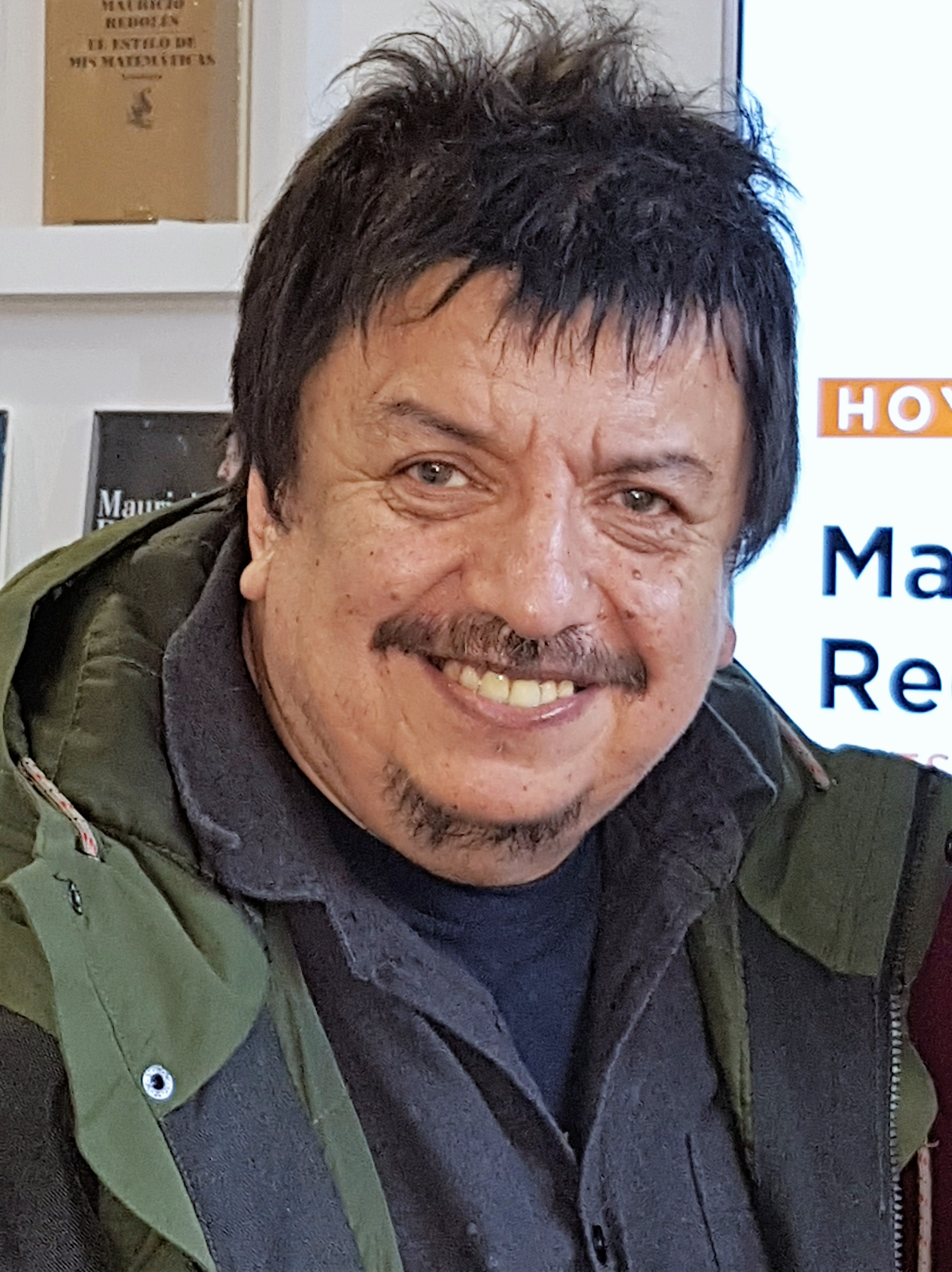
Mauricio Redolés in 2017

Luis Mauricio Redolés Bustos (born 6 June 1953 in Santiago de Chile, Chile) is a Chilean poet, singer-songwriter and musician. His literary and musical work is characterised by irony, satire, humour and use of colloquialisms.

== Biography ==
Redolés studied Law in the Universidad Católica de Valparaíso in 1972 and in the Universidad de Chile, in 1973. After the Chilean coup of 1973, he was detained and tortured by Naval Secret Police. 22 months later, he was exiled to United Kingdom, where he lived for ten years. During this period, he studied Sociology and wrote Tangos in 1978. In 1985 he returned to Santiago de Chile.

On August 31, 2016, Redolés suffered a stroke which left him paralyzed the left half of his body, so he had to learn to walk or play the guitar again.

== Work ==
- Poema Homenaje a los caballos muertos en las cien mil batallas más importantes de la historia de los caballos. Poetry, 1980.
- Poemas urgentes, 1982.
- Notas para la contribución a un estudio materialista sobre los hermosos y horripilantes destellos de la (cabrona) tensa calma. Poetry, 1983.
- Chilean Speech/Chilean Espich. Poetry, 1986.
- Tangos, 1987.
- Estar de la poesía o el estilo de mis matemáticas. Poetry, 2000.

== Discography ==
- Poemas y canciones, 1985 (reeditado en 2006).
- Bello barrio, 1987.
- Química (de la lucha de clases), 1991.
- ¿Quién mató a Gaete?, 1996.
- Bailables de Cueto Road, 1998.
- Redolés en Shile (work in progress), 2001.
- 12 Thomas, 2004
