= Edgardo Fuentes =

Chilean footballer (born 1958)

Personal information
- Full name: Edgardo Enrique Fuentes Silva
- Date of birth: 18 August 1958 (age 68)
- Place of birth: Santiago, Chile
- Height: 1.83 m (6 ft 0 in)
- Position: Defender

Senior career*
Years	Team	Apps	(Gls)
1977–1983	Palestino		
1986–1989	Cruz Azul		
1989–1990	Puebla		
1990–1992	León	74	(1)
1992	Cobreloa		
1993–1994	Morelia	40	(1)
1995	Unión Española		
1996	Palestino		

International career
1983	Chile	1	(0)

Managerial career
- 2001: León
- 2001: León (assistant)
- 2004: León (assistant)
- 2005: Querétaro
- 2006: Lagartos de Tabasco (assistant)
- 2006–2007: Morelia (assistant)
- 2012–2014: Cruz Azul Jasso (assistant)
- 2013: Cruz Azul Jasso
- 2014–2015: Alebrijes de Oaxaca (assistant)
- 2016: Cruz Azul Premier
- 2017–2019: Cruz Azul Hidalgo
- * Club domestic league appearances and goals

Edgardo Enrique Fuentes Silva (born 18 August 1958) is a former Chilean professional footballer who played for Cobreloa in Chile and Puebla F.C., Club León and Atlético Morelia in the Primera División de México. Fuentes was an important part of Cobreloa's championship-winning squad during the 1992 season.
