= Jorge Gómez (footballer) =

Chilean footballer (born 1968)

Personal information
- Full name: Jorge Luis Gómez Carreño
- Date of birth: 14 September 1968 (age 58)
- Place of birth: San Vicente de Tagua Tagua, Chile
- Height: 1.73 m (5 ft 8 in)
- Position: Defender

Senior career*
Years	Team	Apps	(Gls)
1987–1991	O'Higgins		
1992–1993	Universidad Católica		
1994	Deportes Antofagasta		
1995	O'Higgins		
1996	Universidad Católica		
1997	Deportes Temuco		
1998–2000	Cobreloa		
2001	Deportes Puerto Montt		
2002–2003	Unión San Felipe		
2004–2005	O'Higgins		

International career
1991–1998	Chile	7	(0)
1998	Chile B	1	(0)
- * Club domestic league appearances and goals

Jorge Luis Gómez Carreño (born 14 September 1968) is a Chilean retired football defender. He made his debut for the Chile national football team on 1997-06-11 in a Copa América match against Paraguay. He obtained a total number of eight caps during his professional career.

== International career ==
Gómez made 7 appearances for Chile from 1997 to 1998. In addition, he played for Chile B against England B on 10 February 1998. Chile won by 2-1.

== Personal life ==
He was born in San Vicente de Tagua Tagua and his nickname is Choche, an affectionate form of "Jorge".
