= Andrés Velasco =

Chilean politician (born 1960)

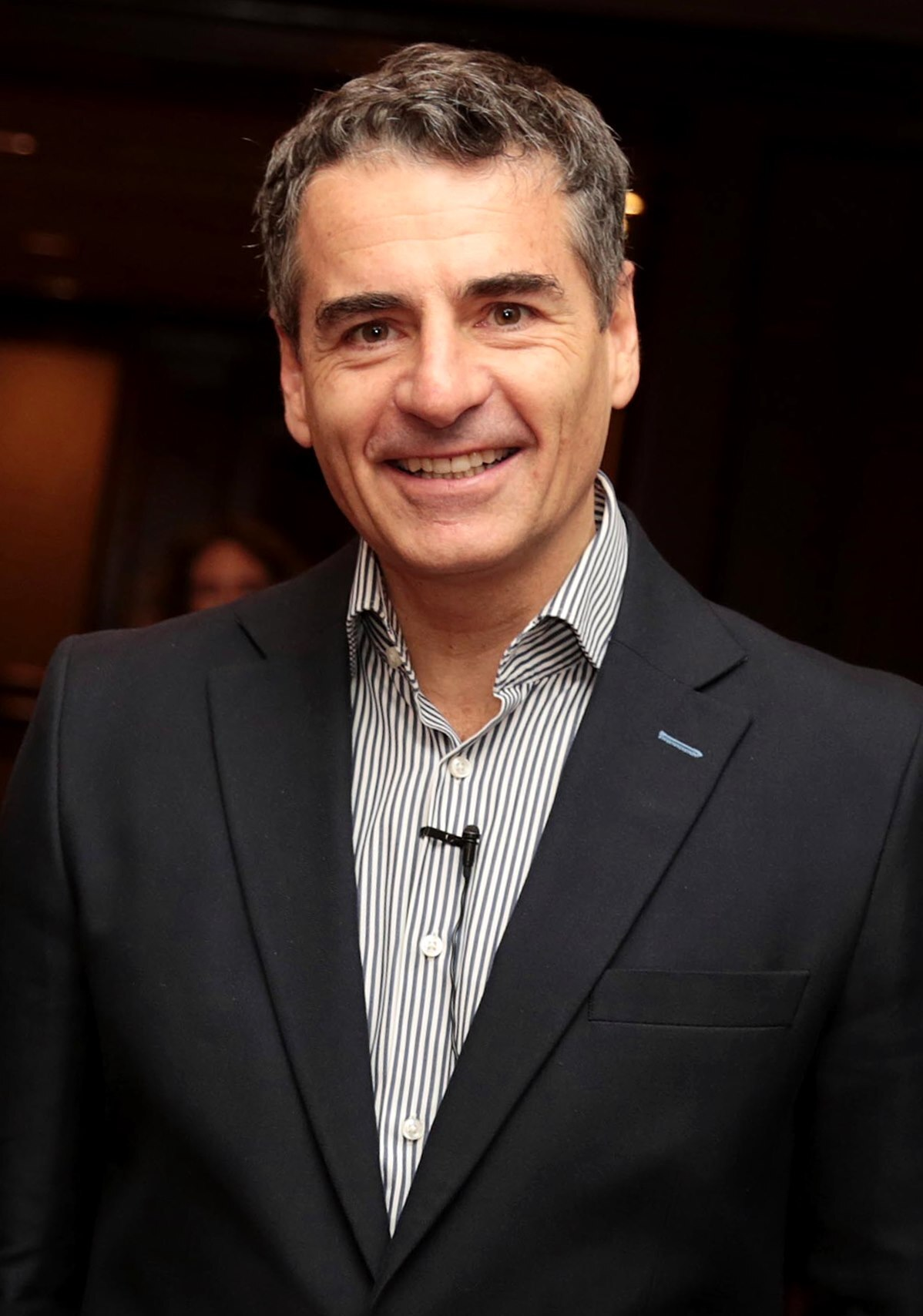

Minister of Finance of Chile
- In office 11 March 2006 – 11 March 2010
- President: Michelle Bachelet
- Preceded by: Nicolás Eyzaguirre
- Succeeded by: Felipe Larraín

Dean of LSE School of Public Policy
- Incumbent
- Assumed office 17 September 2018

Personal details
- Born: 30 August 1960 (age 66) Santiago, Chile
- Party: Citizens (2013–)
- Education: Yale University; Columbia University

Andrés Velasco Brañes (Spanish pronunciation: [anˈdɾes βeˈlasko]; born August 30, 1960) is a Chilean economist and professor who served as Minister of Finance in the first government of President Michelle Bachelet from March 2006 to March 2010. He is currently the Dean of the School of Public Policy at the London School of Economics and Political Science.

== Early life and education ==
The son of former radical politician Eugenio Velasco and lawyer Marta Brañes, Velasco was born in Santiago, where he lived until the age of 16. Following the exile of his father in 1977, the whole family moved to the US, first to Los Angeles and then to Boston. He finished his secondary school studies at Groton School, Groton, MA. He holds a PhD in economics from Columbia University. He took postdoctorate studies at Harvard University and at Massachusetts Institute of Technology (MIT). Earlier, he obtained his bachelor's degree in economics and philosophy at Yale University, and a master's degree in international relations at the same university. He is Sumitomo-FASID professor of Development and International Finance at Harvard University's John F. Kennedy School of Government.

== Early career ==
Velasco served as director of New York University's Center for Latin-American and Caribbean Studies and assistant professor at Columbia University's Department of Economics and Public Affairs. He was Chile's Ministry of Finance Chief of Staff between 1990 and 1992, International Finance coordinator between 1992 and 1994, and North American Free Trade Agreement (NAFTA) negotiator in 1995. From 2000 to 2006, he was Sumitomo-FASID professor of Development and International Finance at Harvard University's John F. Kennedy School of Government.

Between 2001 and February 2006 Velasco was an associate researcher at the Corporation for Latin-American Research (Cieplán) and president of the board of Corporación Expansiva. He was also a consultant for the International Monetary Fund, the Inter-American Development Bank, the World Bank, Economist Intelligence Unit's Government Round Tables, and for the governments of the Dominican Republic, Mexico and El Salvador.

== Political career ==
=== Minister of Finance ===
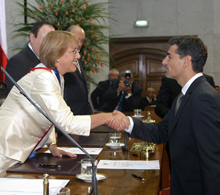
Velasco during the ceremony of assumption as Finance Minister of Chile in March 2006

When the price of copper reached all-time highs in 2006, boosting government revenues, Velasco resisted intense political pressure from government workers and students to spend the windfall. Instead he opted to hold it in reserves equivalent to 30% of the country's GDP. The majority of this increase came from state-owned copper miner Codelco, whose profit contribution, in the form of taxes and dividends, provides approximately 13 percent of government revenues. The minister's frugality enabled Chile to generate its largest budget surpluses in recent memory and the country became the only net creditor Latin American country. After the copper price plummeted following the 2008 financial crisis, threatening the Chilean economy, Velasco then used these reserves on stimulus spending for subsidies and tax cuts, policies now being praised for their positive social impact. His popularity reversed from one of the most reviled politicians to one of the most admired.

=== Political leadership and presidential candidate ===
After serving as Chilean Finance Minister, Velasco expressed his intention to run for President of Chile, during a July 2011 interview with Que Pasa, a Chilean television program. Velasco ran in the primary of the Nueva Mayoría, a coalition of centre-left parties in Chile.

Velasco officially launched his candidacy on May 15, 2012. In the June 30 primary, Velasco achieved second place with 13% of the popular vote total. Velasco finished second behind former Chilean President Michelle Bachelet.

On October 7, 2012, Velasco started a new political movement called Fuerza Pública, which was later renamed Ciudadanos ("Citizens"). Velasco became president of the Ciudadanos party on December 11, 2016. He competed in the parliamentary elections of 2017 for a senatorial seat representing the Maule region. He obtained 10.5% of the votes and narrowly missed being elected senator.

== Return to academia ==
In August 2018, Velasco became the inaugural dean of the newly created LSE School of Public Policy, which is housed at the London School of Economics and Political Science. During its launch ceremony in November 2018, he remarked that the School of Public Policy will strive "to understand the causes of things for the betterment of society," as outlined by LSE's founders. As dean, Velasco serves as a frequent speaker at campus events, teaches a course on macroeconomics, and hosts monthly dean dialogues aimed at providing students with a platform for discussion.

Since 2001, Velasco has written a bimonthly column for Project Syndicate. As dean, he has continued to write articles on a wide range of topics for Project Syndicate, including populism and macroeconomic policy.

In 2021, Velasco was appointed to the World Bank–International Monetary Fund High-Level Advisory Group (HLAG) on Sustainable and Inclusive Recovery and Growth, co-chaired by Mari Pangestu, Ceyla Pazarbasioglu, and Nicholas Stern.

== Recognition ==
Velasco has received several distinctions, including: the Award for Excellence in Research granted by the Inter-American Development Bank (IDB), in recognition of contributions to economic research, the design of policies, and the creation of research institutions in Latin America and the Caribbean (2006); "Latin America Finance Minister of the Year" by Emerging Markets magazine published by Euromoney Institutional Investor plc during the annual meetings of the World Bank and International Monetary Fund, based on the preferences of the most influential economists, investors and experts in the region (2008); an award from América Economía magazine, which also considered him as "Finance Minister of the Year"; and Latin Trade magazine's prize for the "Most Innovative Leader of the Year" (2009).

== Publications ==
- Advanced Macroeconomics: An Easy Guide. Filipe Campante, Federico Sturzenegger, Andrés Velasco. London: LSE Press, 2021
- Trade, Development and the World Economy: Selected Essays of Carlos Díaz-Alejandro. A. Velasco, Editor. Oxford: Basil Blackwell, 1988.
- Vox Populi (novel). Santiago: Editorial Sudamericana, 1995.
- Lugares Comunes ("Common Places" / novel). Santiago: Editorial Planeta, 2003.
- Free Trade and Beyond: Prospects for Integration in the Americas. A. Estevaordal, D. Rodrik, A. Taylor and A. Velasco (eds.). Cambridge: Harvard University Press, 2004.

== Personal life ==
Velasco is married to journalist Consuelo Saavedra and is the father of three.

Political offices
Preceded by Nicolás Eyzaguirre	Minister of Finance; 2006–2010	Succeeded by Felipe Larraín
