= Felipe Larraín Bascuñán =

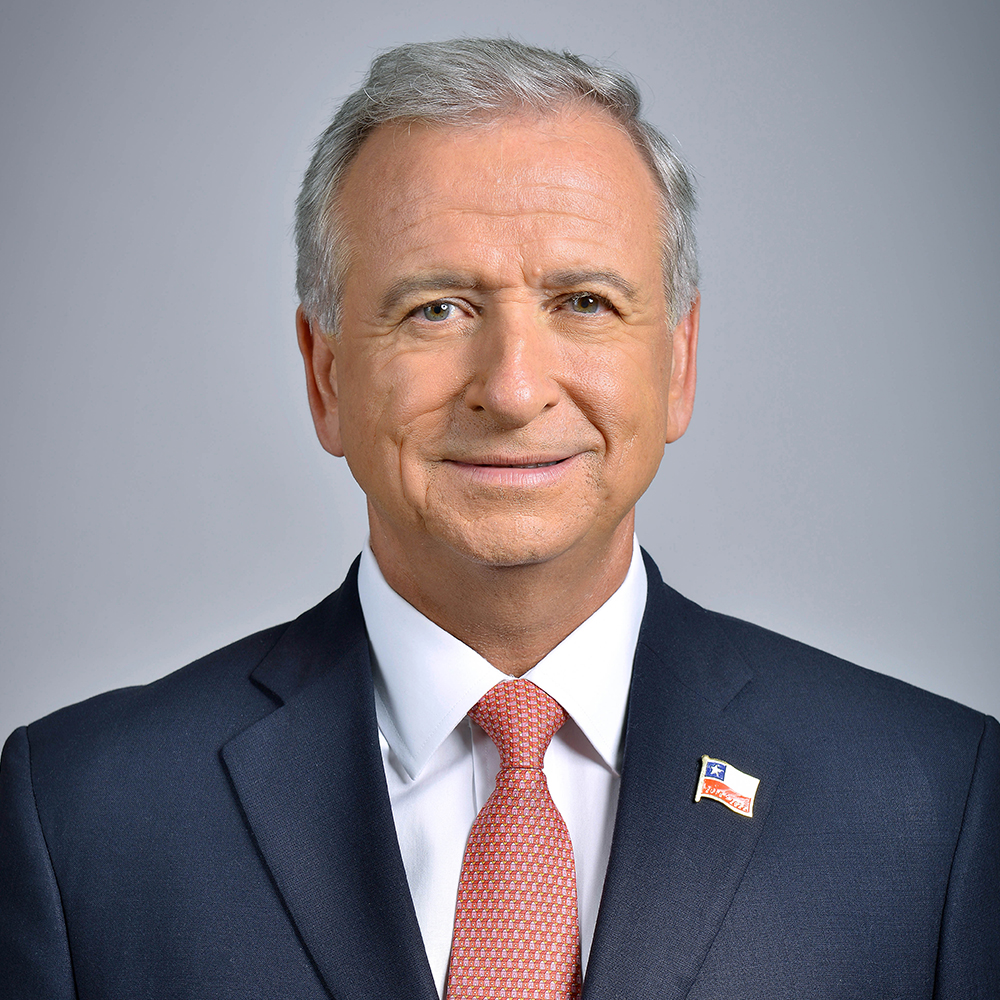

Minister of Finance of Chile
- In office 11 March 2018 – 28 October 2019
- President: Sebastián Piñera
- Preceded by: Nicolás Eyzaguirre
- Succeeded by: Ignacio Briones
- In office 11 March 2010 – 11 March 2014
- President: Sebastián Piñera
- Preceded by: Andrés Velasco Brañes
- Succeeded by: Alberto Arenas

Personal details
- Born: 14 February 1958 (age 68) Santiago, Chile
- Spouse: Francisca Cisternas Lira
- Children: 5
- Education: Pontifical Catholic University of Chile; Harvard University

Felipe Larraín Bascuñán is a Chilean economist, academic and former Minister of Finance under President Sebastián Piñera from 2010 until 2014 and again from 2018 until 2019.

== Early life ==
Larraín's parents are Vicente Larraín Izquierdo and Marta Bascuñán Lazcano. His first studies were carried out in San Ignacio School and Tabancura School in Santiago de Chile. Between 1976 and 1980 he went to college at the Pontifical Catholic University of Chile where he obtained a Bachelor of Arts (Economics) in 1981.

In 1981 Larraín was admitted to the Economics Ph.D Program at Harvard University. He completed his Ph.D. dissertation in 1985, with the title “Essays on the Exchange Rate and Economic Activity in Developing Countries."

== Professional life ==
Larraín began his professional academic career at Pontifical Catholic University of Chile by lecturing courses in Macroeconomics, Economic History and Econometrics. After a few years, he was appointed Full-Time Professor in the same institution. Between 1985 and 1986 he worked as a consultant for the Monetary and Fiscal Authorities in Bolivia and Venezuela. In the same period, he participated as a consultant for the World Bank. These activities lasted until 1988.

In the 90's Larraín was part of the team of economists from the World Bank who advised the transition of Eastern Europe Countries to a modern market economy. He also worked as an economic adviser for Costa Rica, El Salvador, Guatemala, Honduras and Nicaragua, and as a consultant for the United Nations, ECLAC, IBD and the International Monetary Fund.

== Minister of Finance ==
Larraín was one of the main members of the Tantauco group that won the elections in 2009 with Sebastián Piñera as presidential candidate. After their triumph, Larraín became Minister of Finance and Chief of the Economic Team in the Piñera Administration. His mandate started on March 11, 2010.

During his administration, Larraín's work was noticeable because of the successful plan to come up with resources to carry out the reconstruction after a devastating earthquake destroyed a huge amount of infrastructure in February 2010, a few days before the start of the Pinera administration. In 2012, he proposed and successfully approved in the Congress a Tax Reform to inject additional resources to the Education Budget and to fund the Pension Reform from the previous administration.

One of the most praised accomplishments during Larraín's mandate was the creation of more than one million jobs during the Piñera administration. The gross domestic product expanded at one of the highest rates in the world in years when the euro area crisis slowed economic activity.

== Other activities ==
- Inter-American Investment Corporation (IIC), Ex-Officio Member of the Board of Governors (2018–2019)
- Multilateral Investment Guarantee Agency (MIGA), World Bank Group, Ex-Officio Member of the Board of Governors (2018–2019)
- World Bank, Ex-Officio Member of the Board of Governors (2018–2019)

== Recognition ==
Larraín has received several awards. In 1980, he was awarded the Raul Yver Oxley Prize to the best graduating student in Economics from his class. In 2002, he was chosen as the Commercial Engineer of the Year by his peers in Pontifical Catholic University of Chile.

In October 2010, Larraín was named the Finance Minister of the Year by Emerging Markets. In January 2011, he was elected the Finance Minister of the Year for America by the British newspaper The Banker.

== Selected works ==
- Chile: A developed nation, Aguilar, forthcoming, 2007.
- Sachs, Jeffrey and Larraín, Felipe. Macroeconomics in the Global Economy Prentice Hall, 1993.
