= Óscar Rojas (Chilean footballer) =

Chilean footballer (born 1958)

Personal information
- Full name: Óscar Wladimir Rojas Giacomozzi
- Date of birth: 15 November 1958 (age 67)
- Place of birth: Purén, Chile
- Position: Defender

Senior career*
Years	Team	Apps	(Gls)
1979	Malleco Unido		
1980	Deportes Concepción	36	(2)
1981–1988	Colo-Colo	183	(3)
1988–1989	Puebla		
1989	Unión Española	15	(1)
1990	Universidad de Chile	0	(0)
1990–1991	Morelia		

International career
1982–1988	Chile	9	(1)
- * Club domestic league appearances and goals

Óscar Wladimir Rojas Giacomozzi (born November 15, 1958, in Purén) is a former football defender from Chile.

== Career ==
Rojas mainly played for Colo-Colo. He represented Chile at the 1982 FIFA World Cup, wearing the number 17 jersey.
