= History of Chile =

The territory of Chile has been populated since at least 3000 BC. By the 16th century, Spanish invaders began to raid the region of present-day Chile, and the territory was a colony from 1540 to 1818, when it gained independence from Spain. The country's economic development was successively marked by the export of first agricultural produce, then saltpeter and later copper. The wealth of raw materials led to an economic upturn, but also led to dependency, and even wars with neighboring states. Chile was governed during most of its first 150 years of independence by different forms of restricted government, where the electorate was carefully vetted and controlled by an elite.

Failure to address the economic and social increases and increasing political awareness of the less-affluent population, as well as indirect intervention and economic funding to the main political groups by the CIA, as part of the Cold War, led to a political polarization under Socialist president Salvador Allende. This in turn resulted in the 1973 coup d'état and the military dictatorship of General Augusto Pinochet, whose seventeen-year regime was responsible for many human rights violations and deep market-oriented economic reforms. In 1990, Chile made a peaceful transition to democracy and initiated a succession of democratic governments.

== Early history (13,000 BCE - 1540 CE) ==
There are various theories about how and when humans arrived in the Americas. It is generally agreed that people migrated from Asia to North America via the Bering Strait, which connected Siberia and Alaska. The Coastal Migration Hypothesis posits that these humans then migrated southwards along the western coast of the Americas, thus populating Central and South America. Some archaeologists suspect multiple migrations may have taken place.

Researchers have proven that humans have lived in the valleys and coastal areas of what is now present-day Chile for at least 14,500 years. The archaeological site Monte Verde in southern Chile predates the well-known Clovis culture site in New Mexico by at least 1,000 years. Evidence of early human settlements in Chile have been found in Cueva del Milodón and the Pali Aike Crater's lava tube.

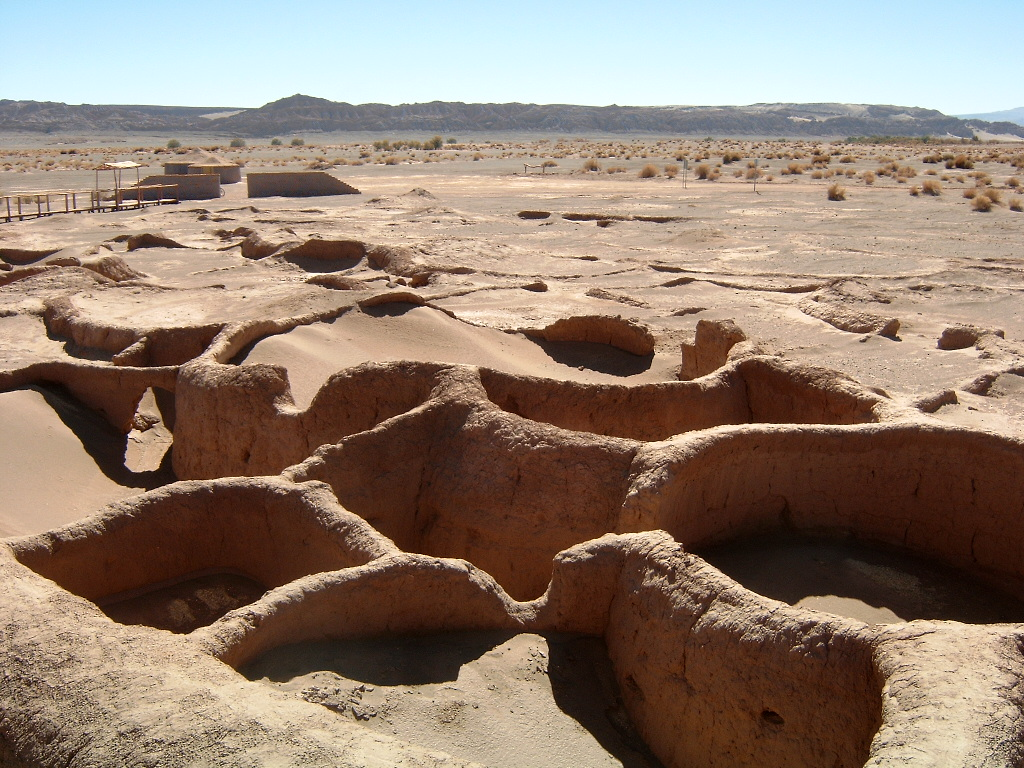
"Tulor" settlement near San Pedro de Atacama, a Pre-Columbian Atacameño culture

Pre-Hispanic Chile was home to over a dozen different Indigenous societies, including Atacameños, Aymara, Chango, Chono, Qulla, Diaguita, Kawésqar, Mapuche, Quechua, Rapa Nui, Selk'nam, Tehuelche, and Yaghan communities. The largest Indigenous group in Chile was the Mapuche. The Mapuche was composed of subgroups, such as the Picunche, the Araucanos, the Pehuenche, and the Huilliche, who lived in different environments and developed unique subcultures.

The Indigenous societies of Chile can be loosely grouped into three categories based on the climate they lived in: the Northern tribes of the Andes Mountains, the Mapuche in central-southern Chile, and the tribes of Patagonia.

=== The Mapuche - Central and Southern Chile ===
The Mapuche lived primarily off agriculture, with some communities using irrigation and others combining slash-and-burn agriculture with hunting.

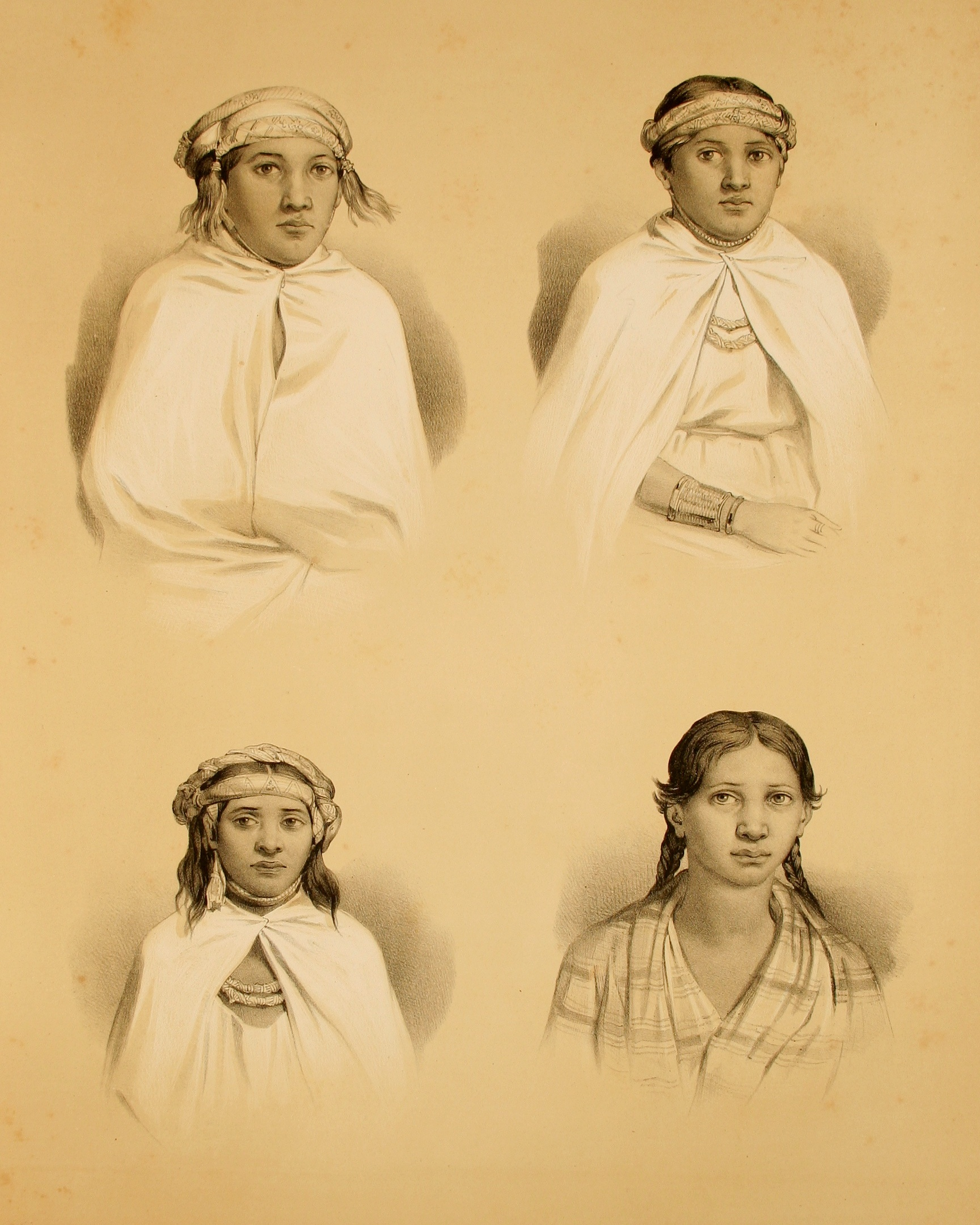
The Mapuche were the original inhabitants of central and southern Chile

The Incan Empire encountered fierce resistance when attempting to colonize Chile. During their attempts at conquest in 1460 and again in 1491, the Sapa Tupac Inca Yupanqui (c. 1471–1493) and his army established forts in the Central Valley of Chile, but they were fought off by the Mapuche. The result of the bloody three-day confrontation known as the Battle of the Maule was that the Inca conquest of the territories of Chile ended at the Maule river, which subsequently became the boundary between the Incan empire and the Mapuche lands until the arrival of the Spaniards.

Scholars speculate that the total Araucanian population may have numbered 1.5 million at most when the Spaniards arrived in the 1530s; a century of European conquest and disease reduced that number by at least half. During the conquest, the Araucanians quickly added horses and European weaponry to their arsenal of clubs and bows and arrows. They became adept at raiding Spanish settlements and, albeit in declining numbers, managed to hold off the Spaniards and their descendants until the late 19th century. The Araucanians' valor inspired the Chileans to mythologize them as the nation's first national heroes, a status that did nothing, however, to elevate the wretched living standard of their descendants.

=== Indigenous societies of Patagonia ===
The tribes of Patagonia include the Chonos, Kawésqar, Tehuelche, Selk'nam, Yagha. They were largely nomadic and supported themselves through fishing and hunting. The name Patagonia comes from the word [[Patagons|patagón,]] which was used by Magellan to describe the native people, whom he thought to be giants. Scholars believe the people he described as patagónes were Tehuelches, who had an average height of 1.80 m (~5′11″) compared to the 1.55 m (~5′1″) average for Spaniards of the time.

Patagonia is split between modern-day Chile and Argentina. The Argentine portion of Patagonia includes the provinces of Neuquén, Río Negro, Chubut and Santa Cruz, as well as the eastern portion of Tierra del Fuego archipelago. The Argentine politico-economic Patagonic Region includes the Province of La Pampa. The Chilean part of Patagonia includes the southern part of Valdivia, Los Lagos in Lake Llanquihue, Chiloé, Puerto Montt and the Archaeological site of Monte Verde, also the fiords and islands south to the regions of Aisén and Magallanes, including the west side of Tierra del Fuego and Cape Horn.

=== Indigenous societies of the Andes Mountains ===
The Indigenous societies who lived in the Andes Mountains or the Atacama Desert include the Atacameños, Aymara, Chango, Colla, and Quechua. They developed rich handicrafts and were influenced by pre-Incan cultures. The Inca Empire briefly extended their empire into what is now northern Chile, where they collected tribute from small groups of fishermen and oasis farmers but were not able to establish a strong cultural presence in the area.

== Spanish conquest and colonization (1520–1810) ==
The first European in recorded history that saw Chilean territory was Ferdinand Magellan, who crossed the Strait of Magellan on November 1, 1520. However, Diego de Almagro is usually attributed with the colonization of Chile. After leading the conquest of Peru with Francisco Pizarro, Almagro organized an expedition that brought him to central Chile in 1537. He did not find anything he considered valuable, so he returned to Peru. He was later garotted following defeat by Hernando Pizarro in a Civil War.

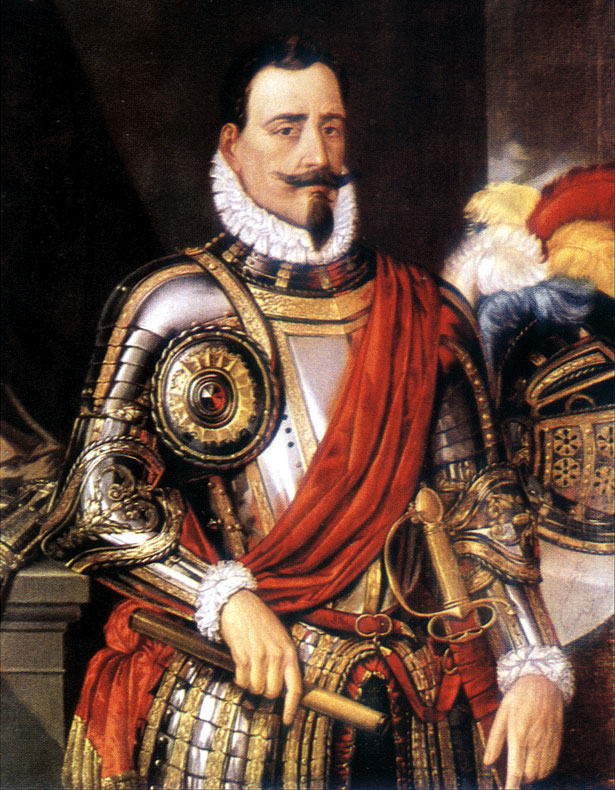
Pedro de Valdivia

After this initial excursion, Pedro de Valdivia, captain of the Spanish army, asked Pizarro's permission to invade and conquer the southern lands with the intent of expanding the Spanish Empire. With a couple of hundred men, he killed or forcefully displaced the Native inhabitants of central Chile. He founded the city of Santiago de Nueva Extremadura, now Santiago de Chile, on February 12, 1541.

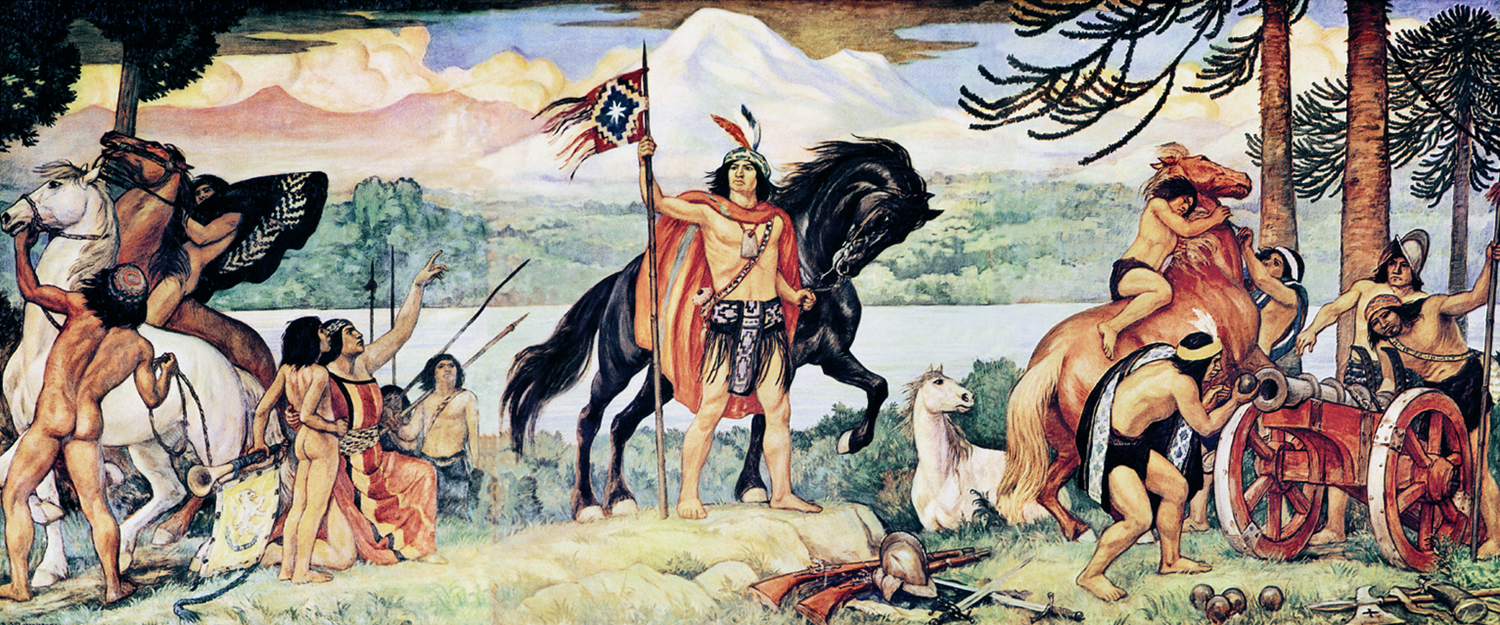
"The young Lautaro," a painting by Pedro Subercaseaux that shows the Mapuche leader during the Arauco war.

Although Valdivia found little gold in Chile, he was interested in the agricultural richness of the land. He continued his explorations of the region west of the Andes, founded over a dozen towns, and established the first encomiendas, in which Indigenous people were enslaved. The greatest resistance to Spanish rule came from the Mapuche people, who opposed European conquest and colonization until the 1880s in what became known as the Arauco War. Valdivia died at the Battle of Tucapel, defeated by Lautaro, a young Mapuche toqui (war chief).

The Spaniards never subjugated the Mapuche territories; various attempts at conquest, both by military and peaceful means, failed. The Great Uprising of 1598 swept all Spanish presence south of the Bío-Bío River except Chiloé (and Valdivia which was decades later reestablished as a fort), and the great river became the frontier line between Mapuche lands and the Spanish realm. North of that line cities grew up slowly, and Chilean lands eventually became an important source of food for the Viceroyalty of Peru.

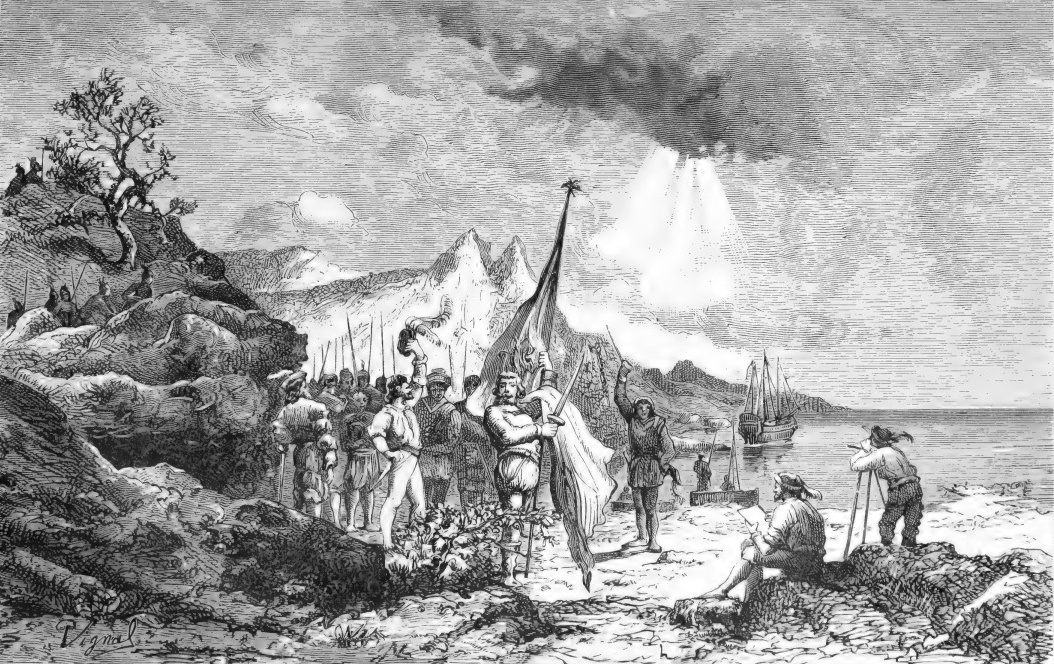
Juan Ladrillero took possession of the Strait of Magellan for the Governorate of Chile and the King of Spain in 1558.

Valdivia became the first governor of the Governorate of Chile. In that post, he obeyed the viceroy of Peru and, through him, the King of Spain and his bureaucracy. Responsible to the governor, town councils known as Cabildo administered local municipalities, the most important of which was Santiago, which was the seat of a Royal Appeals Court (Real Audiencia) from 1609 until the end of colonial rule.

Chile was the least wealthy realm of the Spanish Crown for most of its colonial history. Only in the 18th century did a steady economic and demographic growth begin, an effect of the reforms by Spain's Bourbon dynasty and a more stable situation along the frontier.

== Independence (1810–1818) ==
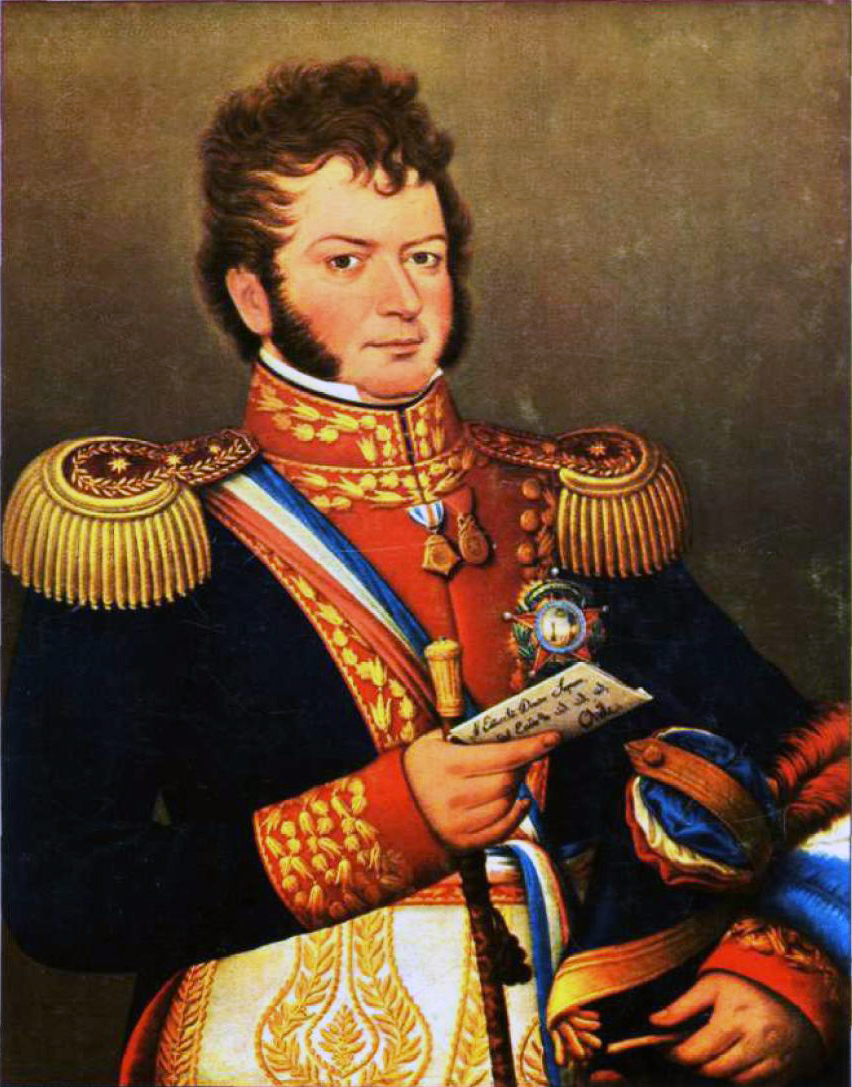
Bernardo O'Higgins

The drive for independence from Spain was precipitated by the usurpation of the Spanish throne by Napoleon's brother Joseph Bonaparte. The Chilean War of Independence was part of the larger Spanish American independence movement, and it was far from having unanimous support among Chileans, who became divided between independentists and royalists. What started as an elitist political movement against their colonial master, finally ended as a full-fledged civil war between pro-Independence Criollos who sought political and economic independence from Spain and royalist Criollos, who supported the continued allegiance to and permanence within the Spanish Empire of the Captaincy General of Chile. The struggle for independence was a war within the upper class, although the majority of troops on both sides consisted of conscripted mestizos and Native Americans.

The beginning of the Independence movement is traditionally dated as of September 18, 1810, when a national junta was established to govern Chile in the name of the deposed king Ferdinand VII. Depending on what terms one uses to define the end, the movement extended until 1821 (when the Spanish were expelled from mainland Chile) or 1826 (when the last Spanish troops surrendered and Chiloé was incorporated into the Chilean republic). The independence process is normally divided into three stages: Patria Vieja, Reconquista, and Patria Nueva.

Chile's first experiment with self-government, the "Patria Vieja" (old fatherland, 1810–1814), was led by José Miguel Carrera, an aristocrat then in his mid-twenties. The military-educated Carrera was a heavy-handed ruler who aroused widespread opposition. Another of the earliest advocates of full independence, Bernardo O'Higgins, captained a rival faction that plunged the Criollos into civil war. For him and certain other members of the Chilean elite, the initiative for temporary self-rule quickly escalated into a campaign for permanent independence, although other Criollos remained loyal to Spain.

Among those favouring independence, conservatives fought with liberals over the degree to which French revolutionary ideas would be incorporated into the movement. After several efforts, Spanish troops from Peru took advantage of the internecine strife to reconquer Chile in 1814, when they reasserted control by the Battle of Rancagua on October 12. O'Higgins, Carrera and many of the Chilean rebels escaped to Argentina.

The second period was characterized by the Spanish attempts to reimpose arbitrary rule during the period known as the Reconquista of 1814–1817 ("Reconquest": the term echoes the Reconquista in which the Christian kingdoms retook Iberia from the Muslims). During this period, the harsh rule of the Spanish loyalists, who punished suspected rebels, drove more and more Chileans into the insurrectionary camp. More members of the Chilean elite were becoming convinced of the necessity of full independence, regardless of who sat on the throne of Spain. As the leader of guerrilla raids against the Spaniards, Manuel Rodríguez became a national symbol of resistance.

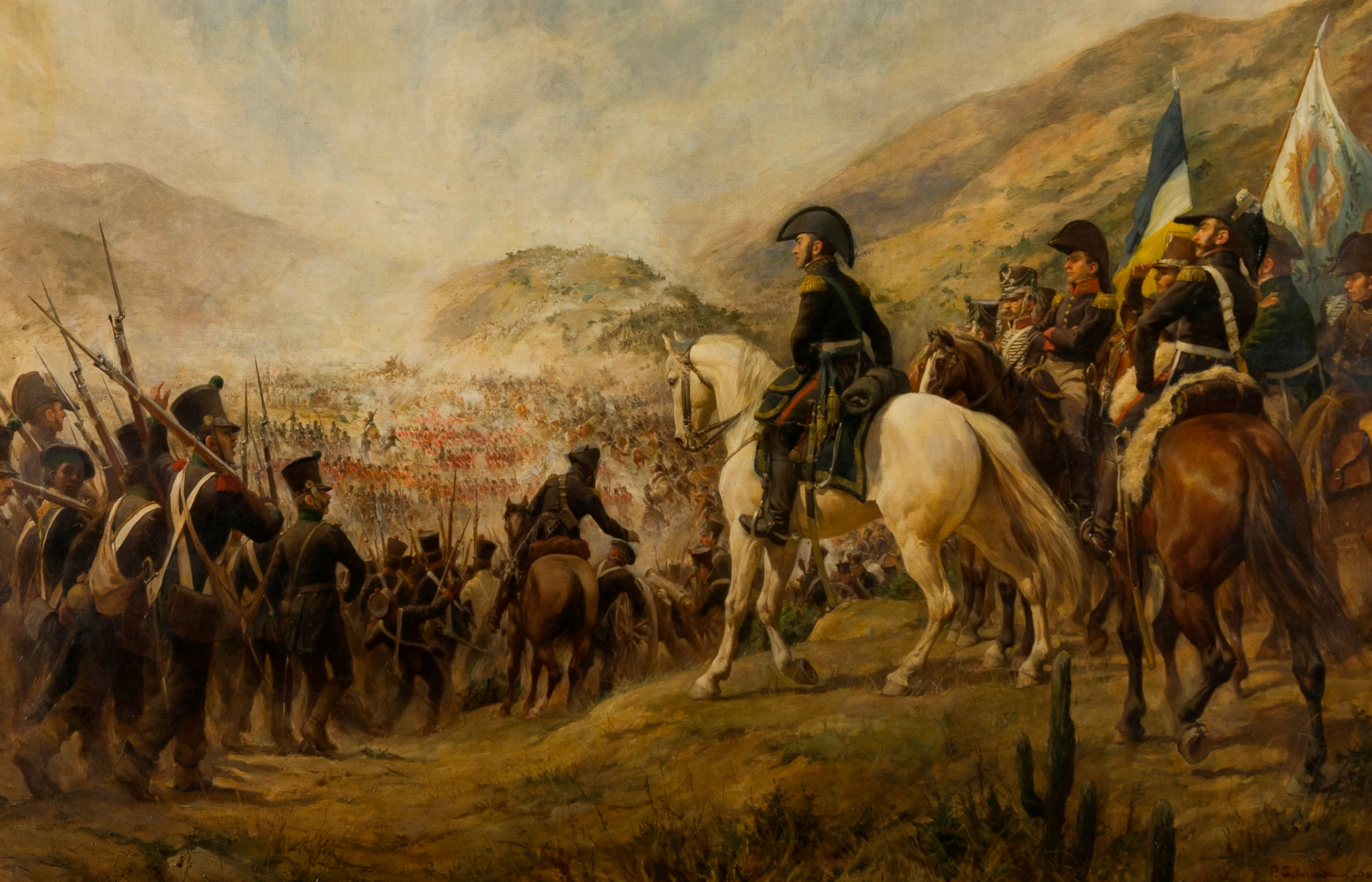
Chilean and Argentinean troops going to the Battle of Chacabuco (February 12, 1817) led by José de San Martín

In exile in Argentina, O'Higgins joined forces with José de San Martín. Their combined army freed Chile with a daring assault over the Andes in 1817, defeating the Spaniards at the Battle of Chacabuco on February 12 and marking the beginning of the Patria Nueva. San Martín considered the liberation of Chile a strategic stepping-stone to the emancipation of Peru, which he saw as the key to hemispheric victory over the Spanish.

Chile won its formal independence when San Martín defeated the last large Spanish force on Chilean soil at the Battle of Maipú on April 5, 1818. San Martín then led his Argentine and Chilean followers north to liberate Peru; and fighting continued in Chile's southern provinces, the bastion of the royalists, until 1826.

A declaration of independence was officially issued by Chile on February 12, 1818, and formally recognized by Spain in 1840, when full diplomatic relations were established.

== Republican era (1818–1891) ==
=== Constitutional organization (1818–1833) ===
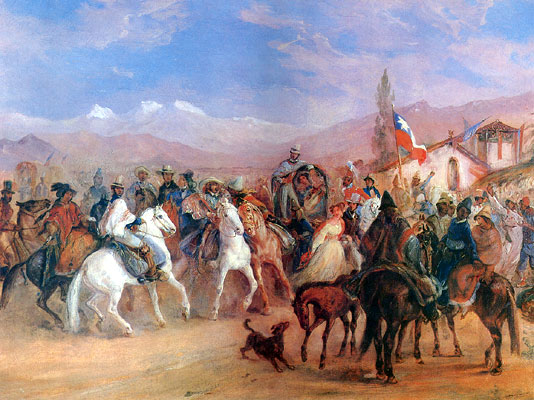
Chilean patriots, by Johann Moritz Rugendas

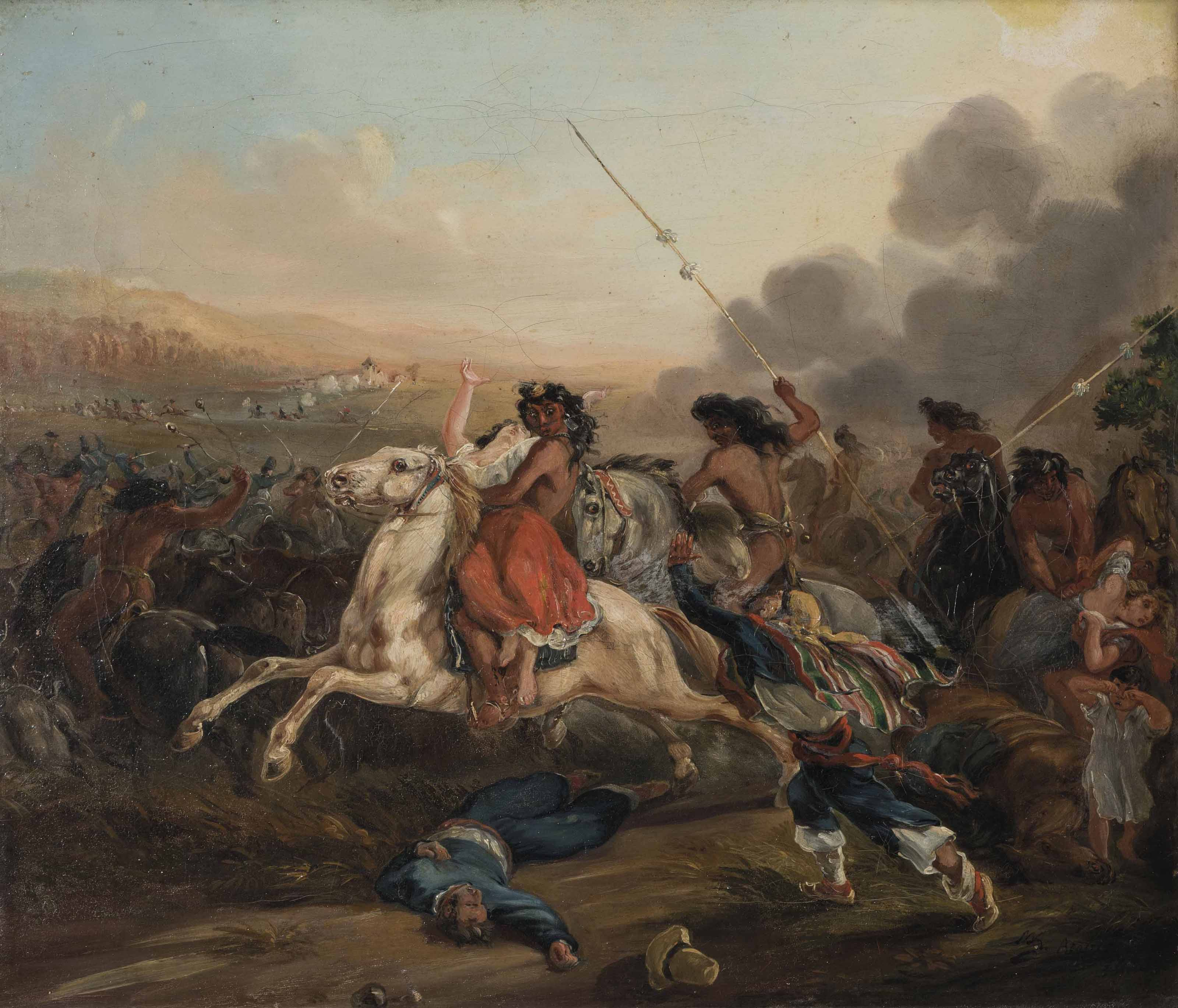
The Arauco War. The painting depicts a woman being kidnapped during a malón

From 1817 to 1823, Bernardo O'Higgins ruled Chile as supreme director. He won plaudits for defeating royalists and founding schools, but civil strife continued. O'Higgins alienated liberals and provincials with his authoritarianism, conservatives and the church with his anticlericalism, and landowners with his proposed reforms of the land tenure system. His attempt to devise a constitution in 1818 that would legitimize his government failed, as did his effort to generate stable funding for the new administration. O'Higgins's dictatorial behavior aroused resistance in the provinces. This growing discontent was reflected in the continuing opposition of partisans of Carrera, who was executed by the Argentine regime in Mendoza in 1821, as were his two brothers three years earlier.

Although opposed by many liberals, O'Higgins angered the Roman Catholic Church with his liberal beliefs. He maintained Catholicism's status as the official state religion but tried to curb the church's political powers and to encourage religious tolerance as a means of attracting Protestant immigrants and traders. Like the church, the landed aristocracy felt threatened by O'Higgins, resenting his attempts to eliminate noble titles and, more important, to eliminate entailed estates.

O'Higgins's opponents also disapproved of his diversion of Chilean resources to aid San Martín's liberation of Peru. O'Higgins insisted on supporting that campaign because he realized that Chilean independence would not be secure until the Spaniards were routed from the Andean core of the empire. However, amid mounting discontent, troops from the northern and southern provinces forced O'Higgins to resign. Embittered, O'Higgins departed for Peru, where he died in 1842.

After O'Higgins went into exile in 1823, civil conflict continued, focusing mainly on the issues of anticlericalism and regionalism. Presidents and constitutions rose and fell quickly in the 1820s. The civil struggle's harmful effects on the economy, and particularly on exports, prompted conservatives to seize national control in 1830.

In the minds of most members of the Chilean elite, the bloodshed and chaos of the late 1820s were attributable to the shortcomings of liberalism and federalism, which had been dominant over conservatism for most of the period. The political camp became divided by supporters of O'Higgins, Carrera, liberal Pipiolos and conservative Pelucones, the two last being the main movements that prevailed and absorbed the rest. The abolition of slavery in 1823—long before most other countries in the Americas—was considered one of the Pipiolos' few lasting achievements. One Pipiolo leader from the south, Ramón Freire, rode in and out of the presidency several times (1823–1827, 1828, 1829, 1830) but could not sustain his authority. From May 1827 to September 1831, with the exception of brief interventions by Freire, the presidency was occupied by Francisco Antonio Pinto, Freire's former vice president.

In August 1828, Pinto's first year in office, Chile abandoned its short-lived federalist system for a unitary form of government, with separate legislative, executive, and judicial branches. By adopting a moderately liberal constitution in 1828, Pinto alienated both the federalists and the liberal factions. He also angered the old aristocracy by abolishing estates inherited by primogeniture (mayorazgo) and caused a public uproar with his anticlericalism. After the defeat of his liberal army at the Battle of Lircay on April 17, 1830, Freire, like O'Higgins, went into exile in Peru.

=== Conservative Era (1830–1861) ===
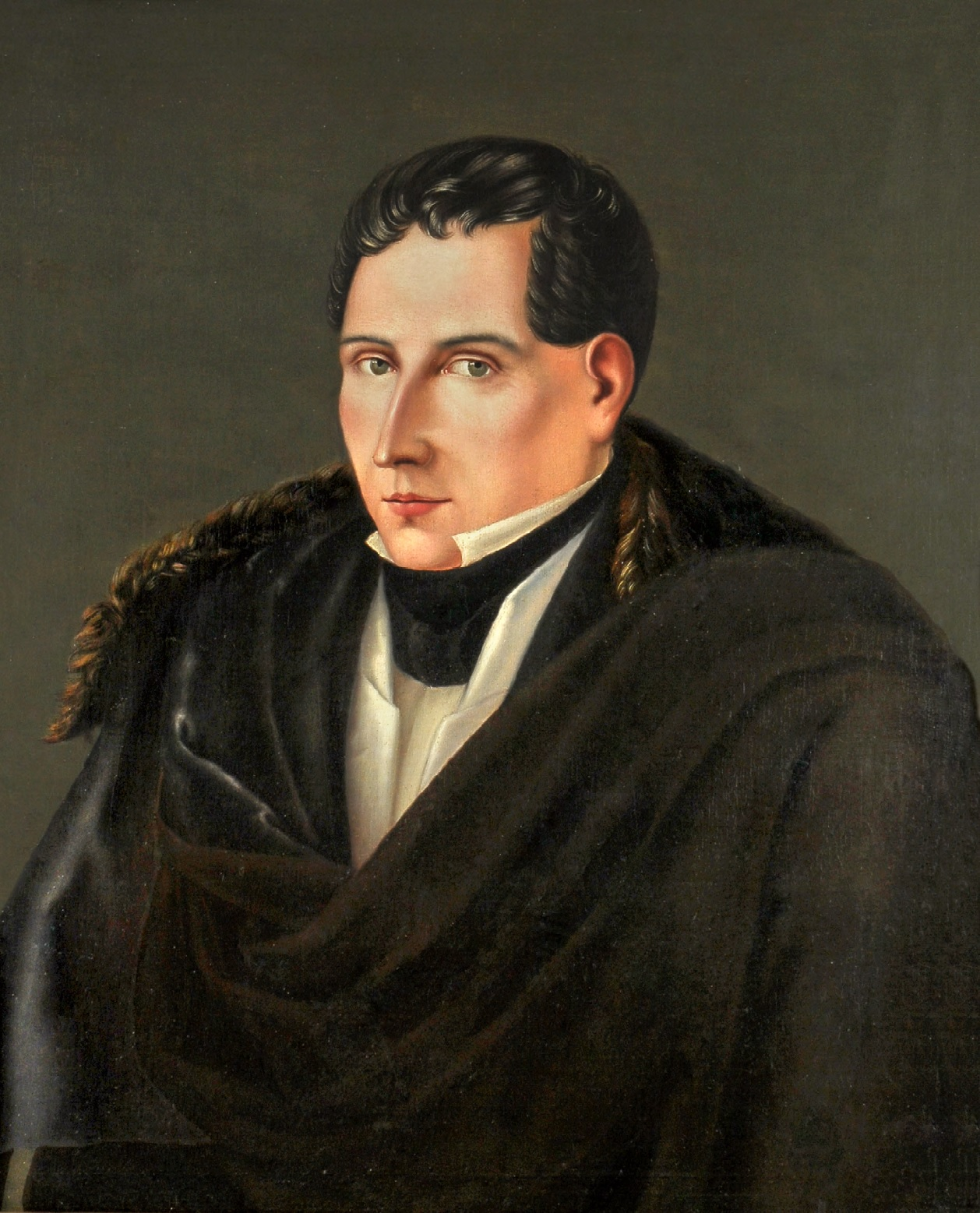
Diego Portales

Although never president, Diego Portales dominated Chilean politics from the cabinet and behind the scenes from 1830 to 1837. He installed the "autocratic republic", which centralized authority in the national government. His political program enjoyed support from merchants, large landowners, foreign capitalists, the church, and the military. Political and economic stability reinforced each other, as Portales encouraged economic growth through free trade and put government finances in order. Portales was an agnostic who said that he believed in the clergy but not in God. He realized the importance of the Roman Catholic Church as a bastion of loyalty, legitimacy, social control and stability, as had been the case in the colonial period. He repealed Liberal reforms that had threatened church privileges and properties.

The "Portalian State" was institutionalized by the Chilean Constitution of 1833. One of the most durable charters ever devised in Latin America, the Portalian constitution lasted until 1925. The constitution concentrated authority in the national government, more precisely, in the hands of the president, who was elected by a tiny minority. The chief executive could serve two consecutive five-year terms and then pick a successor. Although the Congress had significant budgetary powers, it was overshadowed by the president, who appointed provincial officials. The constitution also created an independent judiciary, guaranteed inheritance of estates by primogeniture, and installed Catholicism as the state religion. In short, it established an autocratic system under a republican veneer.

Portales also achieved his objectives by wielding dictatorial powers, censoring the press, and manipulating elections. For the next forty years, Chile's armed forces would be distracted from meddling in politics by skirmishes and defensive operations on the southern frontier, although some units got embroiled in domestic conflicts in 1851 and 1859.

The Portalian president was General Joaquín Prieto, who served two terms (1831–1836, 1836–1841). President Prieto had four main accomplishments: implementation of the 1833 constitution, stabilization of government finances, defeat of provincial challenges to central authority, and victory over the Peru-Bolivia Confederation. During the presidencies of Prieto and his two successors, Chile modernized through the construction of ports, railroads, and telegraph lines, some built by United States entrepreneur William Wheelwright. These innovations facilitated the export-import trade as well as domestic commerce.

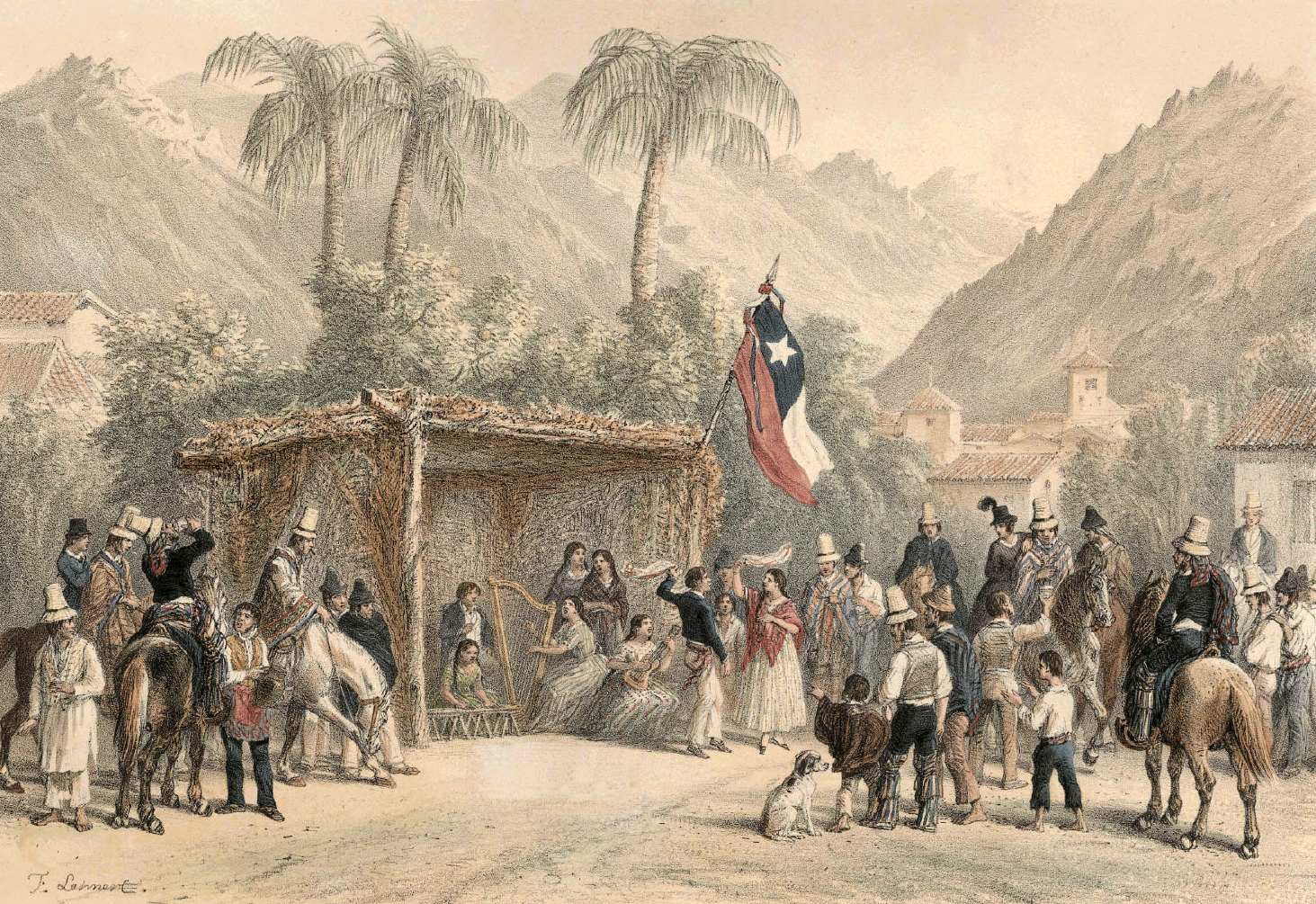
Fiestas Patrias of Chile, 1854

Prieto and his adviser, Portales, feared the efforts of Bolivian general Andrés de Santa Cruz to unite with Peru against Chile. These qualms exacerbated animosities toward Peru dating from the colonial period, now intensified by disputes over customs duties and loans. Chile also wanted to become the dominant South American military and commercial power along the Pacific. Santa Cruz united Peru and Bolivia in the Peru–Bolivian Confederation in 1836 with a desire to expand control over Argentina and Chile. Portales got Congress to declare war on the Confederation. Portales was killed by traitors in 1837. The general Manuel Bulnes defeated the Confederation in the Battle of Yungay in 1839.

After his success Bulnes was elected president in 1841. He served two terms (1841–1846, 1846–1851). His administration concentrated on the occupation of the territory, especially the Strait of Magellan and the Araucanía. The Venezuelan Andres Bello made important intellectual advances in this period, most notably the creation of the University of Santiago. But political tensions, including a liberal rebellion, led to the Chilean Civil War of 1851. In the end the conservatives defeated the liberals.

The last conservative president was Manuel Montt, who also served two terms (1851–1856, 1856–1861), but his poor administration led to the liberal rebellion in 1859. Liberals triumphed in 1861 with the election of Jose Joaquin Perez as president.

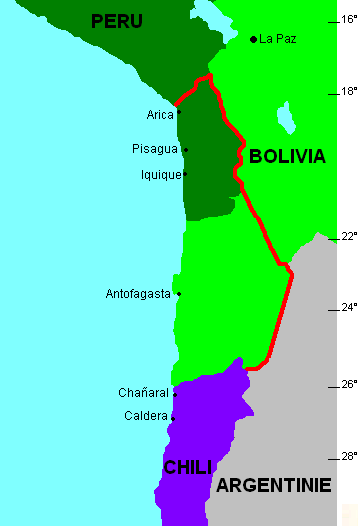
Map showing changes of territory due to the War of the Pacific

=== Liberal era (1861–1891) ===
The political revolt brought little social change, however, and 19th century Chilean society preserved the essence of the stratified colonial social structure, which was greatly influenced by family politics and the Roman Catholic Church. A strong presidency eventually emerged, but wealthy landowners remained powerful.

Territorial losses of the Republic of Chile de jure (by law) according to Chilean historiography.

Toward the end of the 19th century, the government in Santiago consolidated its position in the south by persistently suppressing the Mapuche during the Occupation of the Araucanía. In 1881, it signed the Boundary Treaty of 1881 between Chile and Argentina confirming Chilean sovereignty over the Strait of Magellan, but conceding all of oriental Patagonia, and a considerable fraction of the territory it had during colonial times, ending the East Patagonia, Tierra del Fuego and Strait of Magellan dispute. As a result of the War of the Pacific with Peru and Bolivia (1879–1883), Chile expanded its territory northward by almost one-third and acquired valuable nitrate deposits, the exploitation of which led to an era of national affluence.

In the 1870s, the church influence started to diminish slightly with the passing of several laws that took some old roles of the church into the State's hands such as the registry of births and marriages.

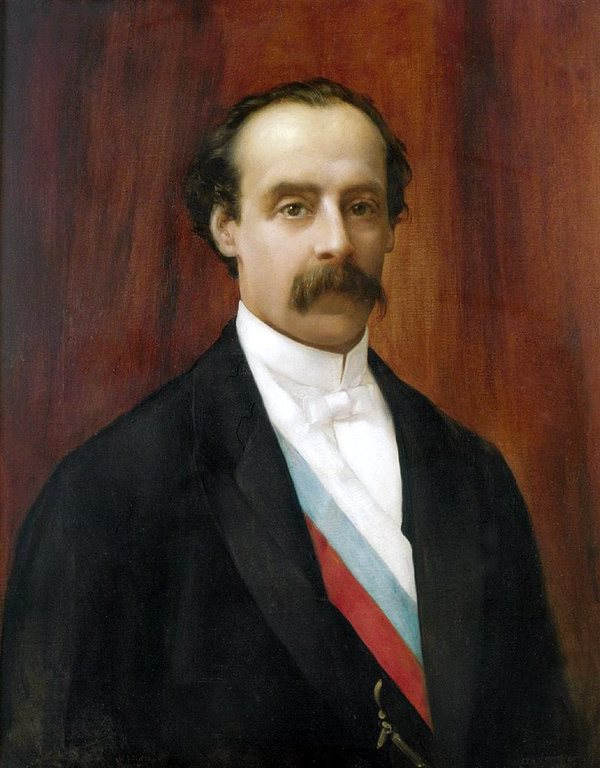
José Manuel Balmaceda

In 1886, José Manuel Balmaceda was elected president. His economic policies visibly changed the existing liberal policies. He began to violate the constitution and slowly began to establish a dictatorship. Congress decided to depose Balmaceda, who refused to step down. Jorge Montt, among others, directed an armed conflict against Balmaceda, which soon extended into the 1891 Chilean Civil War. Defeated, Balmaceda fled to Argentina's embassy, where he committed suicide. Jorge Montt became the new president.

== Parliamentary era (1891–1925) ==
The so-called Parliamentary Republic was not a true parliamentary system, in which the chief executive is elected by the legislature. It was, however, an unusual regime in presidentialist Latin America, for Congress really did overshadow the rather ceremonial office of the president and exerted authority over the chief executive's cabinet appointees. In turn, Congress was dominated by the landed elites. This was the heyday of classic political and economic liberalism.

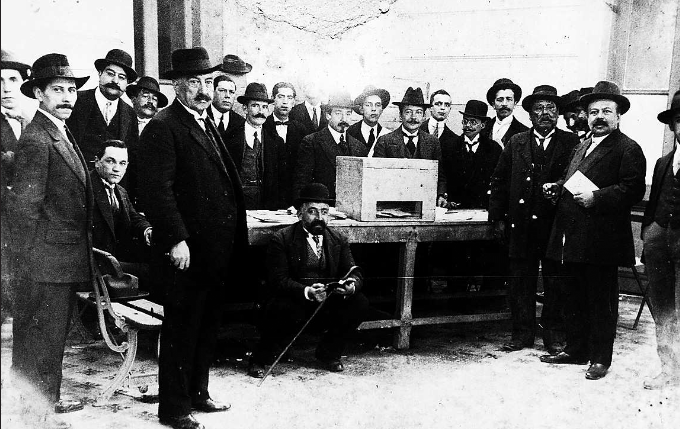
Picture of the 1915 presidential election in Chile

For many decades thereafter, historians derided the Parliamentary Republic as a quarrel-prone system that merely distributed spoils and clung to its laissez-faire policy while national problems mounted. The characterization is epitomized by an observation made by President Ramón Barros Luco (1910–1915), reputedly made in reference to labor unrest: "There are only two kinds of problems: those that solve themselves and those that can't be solved."

At the mercy of Congress, cabinets came and went frequently, although there was more stability and continuity in public administration than some historians have suggested. Chile also temporarily resolved its border disputes with Argentina with the Puna de Atacama Lawsuit of 1899, the Boundary treaty of 1881 between Chile and Argentina and the 1902 General Treaty of Arbitration, though not without engaging in an expensive naval arms race beforehand.

Political authority ran from local electoral bosses in the provinces through the congressional and executive branches, which reciprocated with payoffs from taxes on nitrate sales. Congressmen often won election by bribing voters in this clientelistic and corrupt system. Many politicians relied on intimidated or loyal peasant voters in the countryside, even though the population was becoming increasingly urban. The lackluster presidents and ineffectual administrations of the period did little to respond to the country's dependence on volatile nitrate exports, spiraling inflation, and massive urbanization.

However, particularly when the authoritarian regime of Augusto Pinochet is taken into consideration, some scholars have in recent years reevaluated the Parliamentary Republic of 1891–1925. Without denying its shortcomings, they have lauded its democratic stability. They have also hailed its control of the armed forces, its respect for civil liberties, its expansion of suffrage and participation, and its gradual admission of new contenders, especially reformers, to the political arena. In particular, two young parties grew in importance – the Democrat Party, with roots among artisans and urban workers, and the Radical Party, representing urban middle sectors and provincial elites.

By the early 20th century, both parties were winning increasing numbers of seats in Congress. The more leftist members of the Democrat Party became involved in the leadership of labor unions and broke off to launch the Socialist Workers' Party (Spanish: Partido Obrero Socialista – POS) in 1912. The founder of the POS and its best-known leader, Luis Emilio Recabarren, also founded the Communist Party of Chile (Spanish: Partido Comunista de Chile – PCCh) in 1922.

== Presidential era (1925–1973) ==
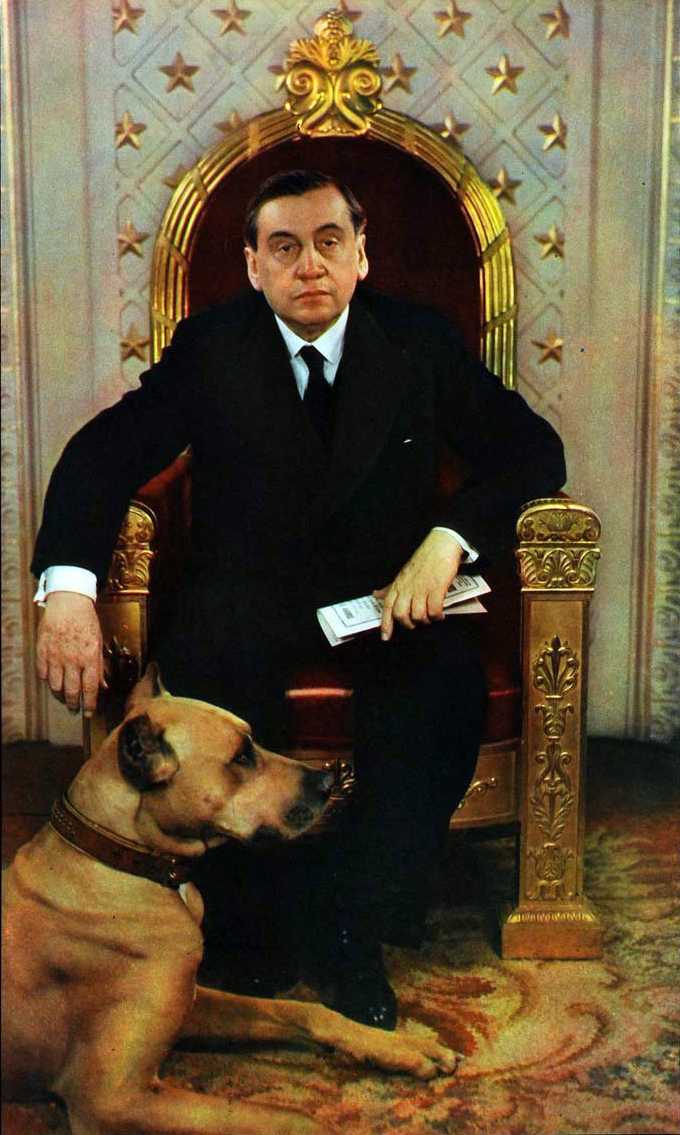
Arturo Alessandri Palma

By the 1920s, the emerging middle and working classes were powerful enough to elect a reformist president, Arturo Alessandri Palma. Alessandri appealed to those who believed the social question should be addressed, to those worried by the decline in nitrate exports during World War I, and to those weary of presidents dominated by Congress. Promising "evolution to avoid revolution", he pioneered a new campaign style of appealing directly to the masses with florid oratory and charisma. After winning a seat in the Senate representing the mining north in 1915, he earned the sobriquet "Lion of Tarapacá."

As a dissident Liberal running for the presidency, Alessandri attracted support from the more reformist Radicals and Democrats and formed the so-called Liberal Alliance. He received strong backing from the middle and working classes as well as from the provincial elites. Students and intellectuals also rallied to his banner. At the same time, he reassured the landowners that social reforms would be limited to the cities.

Alessandri soon discovered that his efforts to lead would be blocked by the conservative Congress. Like Balmaceda, he infuriated the legislators by going over their heads to appeal to the voters in the congressional elections of 1924. His reform legislation was finally rammed through Congress under pressure from younger military officers, who were sick of the neglect of the armed forces, political infighting, social unrest, and galloping inflation, whose program was frustrated by a conservative congress.

A double military coup set off a period of great political instability that lasted until 1932. First military right-wingers opposing Alessandri seized power in September 1924, and then reformers in favor of the ousted president took charge in January 1925. The Saber noise (ruido de sables) incident of September 1924, provoked by discontent of young officers, mostly lieutenants from middle and working classes, lead to the establishment of the September Junta led by General Luis Altamirano and the exile of Alessandri.

However, fears of a conservative restoration in progressive sectors of the army led to another coup in January, which ended with the establishment of the January Junta as interim government while waiting for Alessandri's return. The latter group was led by two colonels, Carlos Ibáñez del Campo and Marmaduke Grove. They returned Alessandri to the presidency that March and enacted his promised reforms by decree. The latter re-assumed power in March, and a new Constitution encapsulating his proposed reforms was ratified in a plebiscite in September 1925.

The new constitution gave increased powers to the presidency. Alessandri broke with the classical liberalism's policies of laissez-faire by creating a Central Bank and imposing a revenue tax. However, social discontents were also crushed, leading to the Marusia massacre in March 1925 followed by the La Coruña massacre.

The longest lasting of the ten governments between 1924 and 1932 was that of General Carlos Ibáñez, who briefly held power in 1925 and then again between 1927 and 1931 in what was a de facto dictatorship. When constitutional rule was restored in 1932, a strong middle-class party, the Radicals, emerged. It became the key force in coalition governments for the next 20 years.

The Seguro Obrero Massacre took place on September 5, 1938, in the midst of a heated three-way election campaign between the ultraconservative Gustavo Ross Santa María, the radical Popular Front's Pedro Aguirre Cerda, and the newly formed Popular Alliance candidate, Carlos Ibáñez del Campo. The National Socialist Movement of Chile supported Ibáñez's candidacy, which had been announced on September 4. In order to preempt Ross's victory, the National Socialists mounted a coup d'état that was intended to take down the rightwing government of Arturo Alessandri Palma and place Ibáñez in power.

During the period of Radical Party dominance (1932–1952), the state increased its role in the economy. In 1952, voters returned Ibáñez to office for another 6 years. Jorge Alessandri succeeded Ibáñez in 1958.

The 1964 presidential election of Christian Democrat Eduardo Frei Montalva by an absolute majority initiated a period of major reform. Under the slogan "Revolution in Liberty", the Frei administration embarked on far-reaching social and economic programs, particularly in education, housing, and agrarian reform, including rural unionization of agricultural workers. By 1967, however, Frei encountered increasing opposition from leftists, who charged that his reforms were inadequate, and from conservatives, who found them excessive. At the end of his term, Frei had accomplished many noteworthy objectives, but he had not fully achieved his party's ambitious goals.

=== Popular Unity years ===
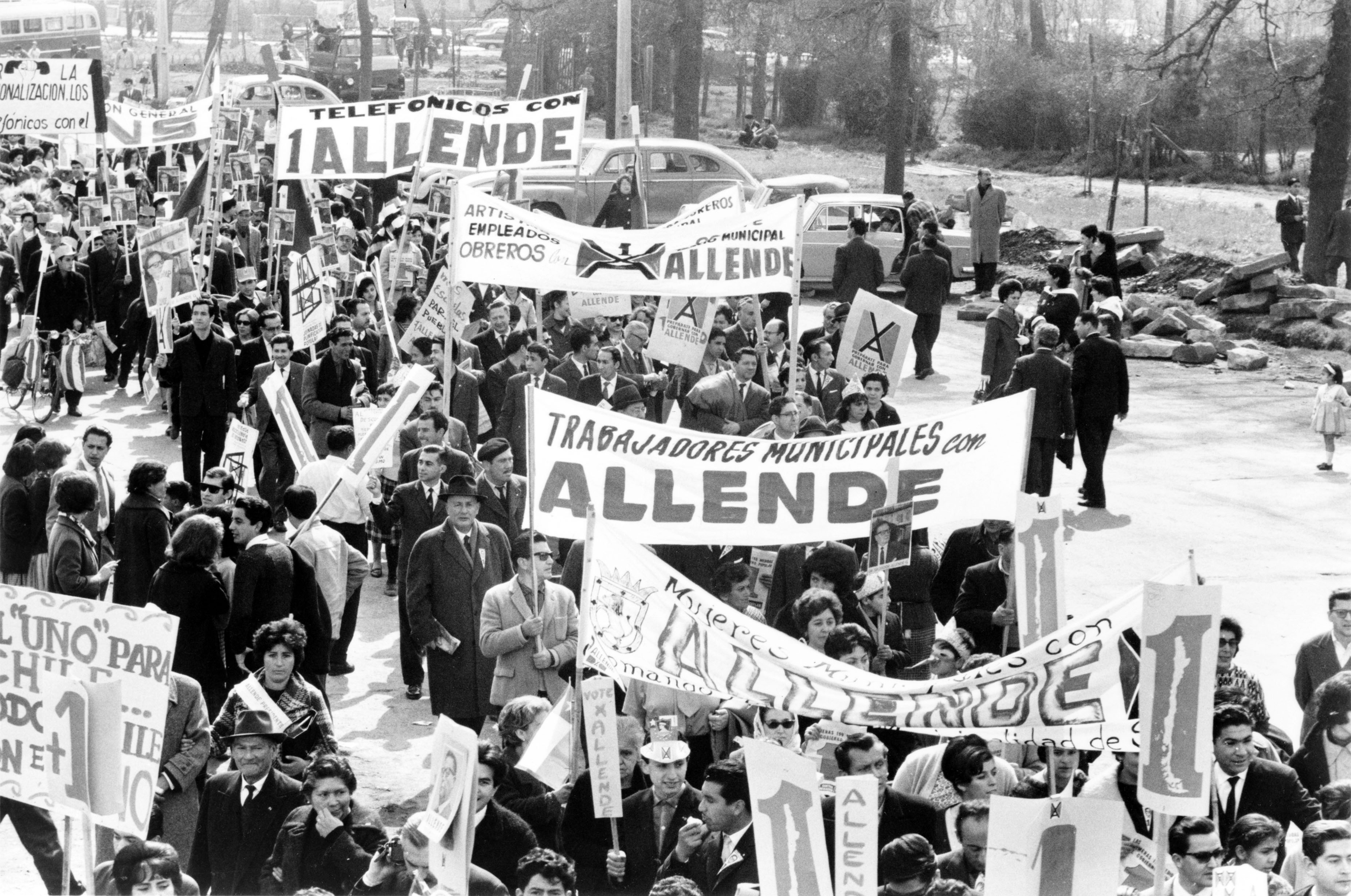
Marchers for Salvador Allende

In the 1970 presidential election, Senator Salvador Allende Gossens won a plurality of votes in a three-way contest. He was a Marxist physician and member of Chile's Socialist Party, who headed the "Popular Unity" (UP or "Unidad Popular") coalition of the Socialist, Communist, Radical, and Social-Democratic Parties, along with dissident Christian Democrats, the Popular Unitary Action Movement (MAPU), and the Independent Popular Action.

Allende had two main competitors in the election — Radomiro Tomic, representing the incumbent Christian Democratic party, who ran a left-wing campaign with much the same theme as Allende's, and the right-wing former president Jorge Alessandri. In the end, Allende received a plurality of the votes cast, getting 36% of the vote against Alessandri's 35% and Tomic's 28%.

Despite pressure from the government of the United States, the Chilean Congress, keeping with tradition, conducted a runoff vote between the leading candidates, Allende and former president Jorge Alessandri. This procedure had previously been a near-formality, yet became quite fraught in 1970. After assurances of legality on Allende's part, the murder of the Army Commander-in-Chief, General René Schneider and Frei's refusal to form an alliance with Alessandri to oppose Allende – on the grounds that the Christian Democrats were a workers' party and could not make common cause with the oligarchs – Allende was chosen by a vote of 153 to 35.

The Popular Unity platform included the nationalization of U.S. interests in Chile's major copper mines, the advancement of workers' rights, deepening of the Chilean land reform, reorganization of the national economy into socialized, mixed, and private sectors, a foreign policy of "international solidarity" and national independence and a new institutional order (the "people's state" or "poder popular"), including the institution of a unicameral congress. Immediately after the election, the United States expressed its disapproval and raised a number of economic sanctions against Chile.

In addition, the CIA's website reports that the agency aided three different Chilean opposition groups during that time period and "sought to instigate a coup to prevent Allende from taking office". The action plans to prevent Allende from coming to power were known as Track I and Track II.

In the first year of Allende's term, the short-term economic results of Economics Minister Pedro Vuskovic's expansive monetary policy were unambiguously favorable: 12% industrial growth and an 8.6% increase in GDP, accompanied by major declines in inflation (down from 34.9% to 22.1%) and unemployment (down to 3.8%). Allende adopted measures including price freezes, wage increases, and tax reforms, which had the effect of increasing consumer spending and redistributing income downward. Joint public-private public works projects helped reduce unemployment. Much of the banking sector was nationalized. Many enterprises within the copper, coal, iron, nitrate, and steel industries were expropriated, nationalized, or subjected to state intervention. Industrial output increased sharply and unemployment fell during the administration's first year. However, these results were not sustainable and in 1972 the Chilean escudo had runaway inflation of 140%. An economic depression that had begun in 1967 peaked in 1972, exacerbated by capital flight, plummeting private investment, and withdrawal of bank deposits in response to Allende's socialist program. Production fell and unemployment rose. The combination of inflation and government-mandated price-fixing led to the rise of black markets in rice, beans, sugar, and flour, and a "disappearance" of such basic commodities from supermarket shelves.

Recognizing that U.S. intelligence forces were trying to destabilize his presidency through a variety of methods, the KGB offered financial assistance to the first democratically elected Marxist president. However, the reason behind the U.S. covert actions against Allende concerned not the spread of Marxism but fear over losing control of its investments. "By 1968, 20 percent of total U.S. foreign investment was tied up in Latin America...Mining companies had invested $1 billion over the previous fifty years in Chile's copper mining industry – the largest in the world – but they had sent $7.2 billion home." Part of the CIA's program involved a propaganda campaign that portrayed Allende as a would-be Soviet dictator. In fact, however, "the U.S.'s own intelligence reports showed that Allende posed no threat to democracy." Nevertheless, the Richard Nixon administration organized and inserted secret operatives in Chile, in order to quickly destabilize Allende's government.

In addition, Nixon gave instructions to make the Chilean economy scream, and international financial pressure restricted economic credit to Chile. Simultaneously, the CIA funded opposition media, politicians, and organizations, helping to accelerate a campaign of domestic destabilization. By 1972, the economic progress of Allende's first year had been reversed, and the economy was in crisis. Political polarization increased, and large mobilizations of both pro- and anti-government groups became frequent, often leading to clashes.

By 1973, Chilean society had grown highly polarized, between strong opponents and equally strong supporters of Salvador Allende and his government. Military actions and movements, separate from the civilian authority, began to manifest in the countryside. The Tanquetazo was a failed military coup d'état attempted against Allende in June 1973.

In its "Agreement", on August 22, 1973, the Chamber of Deputies of Chile asserted that Chilean democracy had broken down and called for "redirecting government activity", to restore constitutional rule. Less than a month later, on September 11, 1973, the Chilean military deposed Allende, who shot himself in the head to avoid capture as the Presidential Palace was surrounded and bombed. Subsequently, rather than restore governmental authority to the civilian legislature, Augusto Pinochet exploited his role as Commander of the Army to seize total power and to establish himself at the head of a junta.

CIA involvement in the coup is documented. As early as the Church Committee Report (1975), publicly available documents have indicated that the CIA attempted to prevent Allende from taking office after he was elected in 1970; the CIA itself released documents in 2000 acknowledging this and that Pinochet was one of their favored alternatives to take power.

According to the Vasili Mitrokhin and Christopher Andrew, the KGB and the Cuban Intelligence Directorate launched a campaign known as Operation TOUCAN. For instance, in 1976, The New York Times published 66 articles on human rights abuses in Chile and only 4 on Cambodia, where the communist Khmer Rouge killed some 1.5 million people of 7.5 million people in the country.

== Military dictatorship (1973–1990) ==
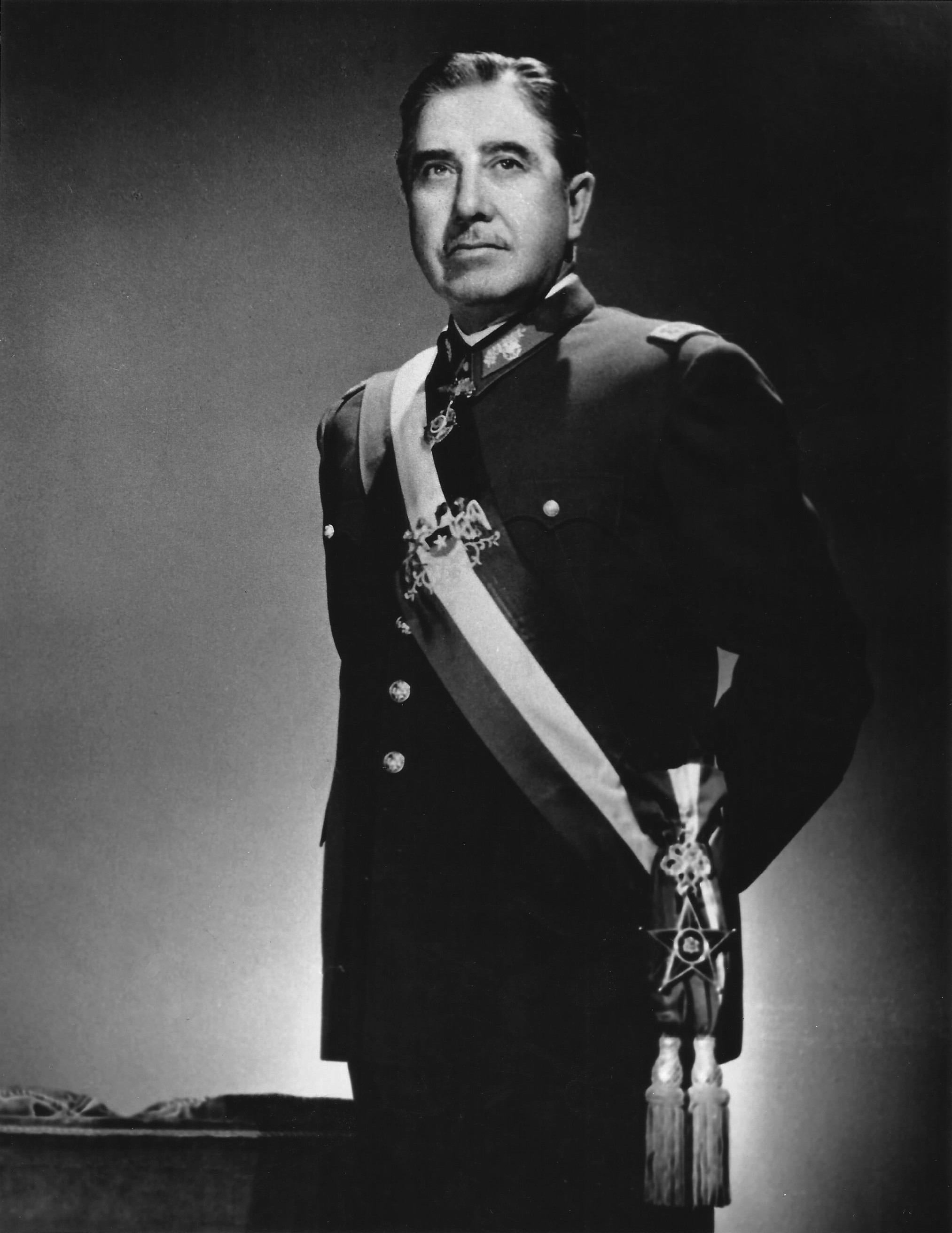
Augusto Pinochet

By early 1973, inflation had risen 600% under Allende's presidency. The crippled economy was further battered by prolonged and sometimes simultaneous strikes by physicians, teachers, students, truck owners, copper workers, and the small business class. A military coup overthrew Allende on September 11, 1973. As the armed forces bombarded the presidential palace (Palacio de La Moneda), Allende committed suicide. A military government, led by General Augusto Pinochet Ugarte, took over control of the country.

The first years of the regime were marked by human rights violations. The junta jailed, tortured, and executed thousands of Chileans. In October 1973, at least 72 people were murdered by the Caravan of Death. At least a thousand people were executed during the first six months of Pinochet in office, and at least two thousand more were killed during the next sixteen years, as reported by the Rettig Report. At least 29,000 were imprisoned and tortured. According to the Latin American Institute on Mental Health and Human Rights (ILAS), "situations of extreme trauma" affected about 200,000 persons.; this figure includes individuals killed, tortured or exiled, and their immediate families. About 30,000 left the country.

The four-man junta headed by General Augusto Pinochet abolished civil liberties, dissolved the national congress, banned union activities, prohibited strikes and collective bargaining, and erased the Allende administration's agrarian and economic reforms.

The junta embarked on a radical program of liberalization, deregulation and privatization, slashing tariffs as well as government welfare programs and deficits. Economic reforms were drafted by a group of technocrats who became known as the Chicago Boys because many of them had been trained or influenced by University of Chicago professors. Under these new policies, the rate of inflation dropped:

Year	1973	1974	1975	1976	1977	1978	1979	1980	1981	1982
Inflation (%)	508.1	376.0	340.0	174.0	63.5	30.3	38.9	31.2	9.5	20.7

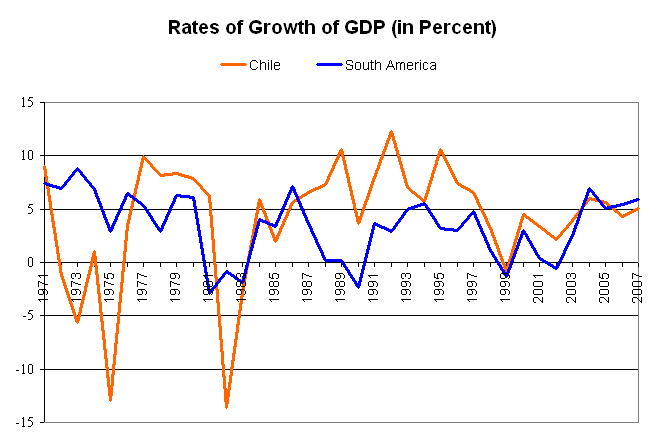
Chilean (orange) and average Latin American (blue) rates of growth of GDP (1971–2007)

A new constitution was approved by plebiscite characterized by the absence of registration lists, on September 11, 1980, and General Pinochet became president of the republic for an 8-year term.

In 1982–1983 Chile witnessed a severe economic crisis with a surge in unemployment and a meltdown of the financial sector. 16 out of 50 financial institutions faced bankruptcy. In 1982 the two biggest banks were nationalized to prevent an even worse credit crunch. In 1983 another five banks were nationalized and two banks had to be put under government supervision. The central bank took over foreign debts. Critics ridiculed the economic policy of the Chicago Boys as "Chicago way to socialism“.

After the economic crisis, Hernán Büchi became Minister of Finance from 1985 to 1989, introducing a more pragmatic economic policy. He allowed the peso to float and reinstated restrictions on the movement of capital in and out of the country. He introduced Bank regulations, simplified and reduced the corporate tax. Chile went ahead with privatizations, including public utilities plus the re-privatization of companies that had returned to the government during the 1982–1983 crisis. From 1984 to 1990, Chile's gross domestic product grew by an annual average of 5.9%, the fastest on the continent. Chile developed a good export economy, including the export of fruits and vegetables to the northern hemisphere when they were out of season, and commanded high prices.

The military junta began to change during the late 1970s. Due to problems with Pinochet, Leigh was expelled from the junta in 1978 and replaced by General Fernando Matthei. In the late 1980s, the government gradually permitted greater freedom of assembly, speech, and association, to include trade union and political activity. Due to the Caso Degollados ("slit throats case"), in which three Communist party members were assassinated, César Mendoza, member of the junta since 1973 and representants of the carabineros, resigned in 1985 and was replaced by Rodolfo Stange. The next year, Carmen Gloria Quintana was burnt alive in what became known as the Caso Quemado ("Burnt Alive case").

Chile's constitution established that in 1988 there would be another plebiscite in which the voters would accept or reject a single candidate proposed by the Military Junta. Pinochet was, as expected, the candidate proposed, but was denied a second 8-year term by 54.5% of the vote.

== Transition to democracy (1990–) ==
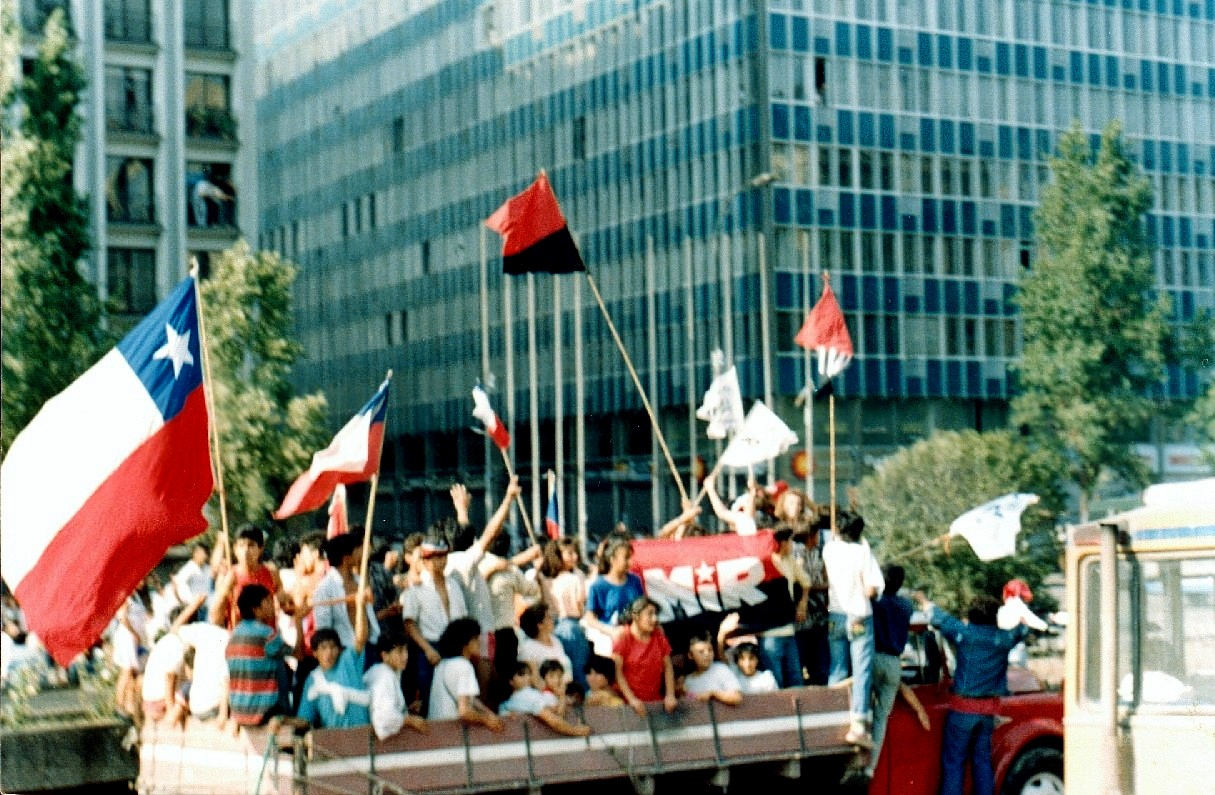
"No" supporters celebrate their victory in the 1988 referendum

=== Aylwin, Frei, and Lagos ===
Chileans elected a new president and the majority of members of a two-chamber congress on December 14, 1989. Christian Democrat Patricio Aylwin, the candidate of a coalition of 17 political parties called the Concertación, received an absolute majority of votes (55%). President Aylwin served from 1990 to 1994, in what was considered a transition period. In February 1991 Aylwin created the National Commission for Truth and Reconciliation, which released in February 1991 the Rettig Report on human rights violations committed during the military rule.

This report counted 2,279 cases of "disappearances" which could be proved and registered. Of course, the very nature of "disappearances" made such investigations very difficult. The same problem arose, several years later, with the Valech Report, released in 2004 and which counted almost 30,000 victims of torture, among testimonies from 35,000 persons.

In December 1993, Christian Democrat Eduardo Frei Ruiz-Tagle, the son of previous president Eduardo Frei Montalva, led the Concertación coalition to victory with an absolute majority of votes (58%). Frei Ruiz-Tagle was succeeded in 2000 by Socialist Ricardo Lagos, who won the presidency in an unprecedented runoff election against Joaquín Lavín of the rightist Alliance for Chile, by a very tight score of fewer than 200,000 votes (51,32%).

In 1998, Pinochet travelled to London for back surgery. But under orders of Spanish judge Baltasar Garzón, he was arrested there, attracting worldwide attention, not only because of the history of Chile and South America, but also because this was one of the first arrests of a former president based on the universal jurisdiction principle. Pinochet tried to defend himself by referring to the State Immunity Act of 1978, an argument rejected by the British justice. However, UK Home Secretary Jack Straw took the responsibility to release him on medical grounds, and refused to extradite him to Spain. Thereafter, Pinochet returned to Chile in March 2000. Upon descending the plane on his wheelchair, he stood up and saluted the cheering crowd of supporters, including an army band playing his favorite military march tunes, which was awaiting him at the airport in Santiago. President Ricardo Lagos later commented that the retired general's televised arrival had damaged the image of Chile, while thousands demonstrated against him.

=== Bachelet and Piñera ===
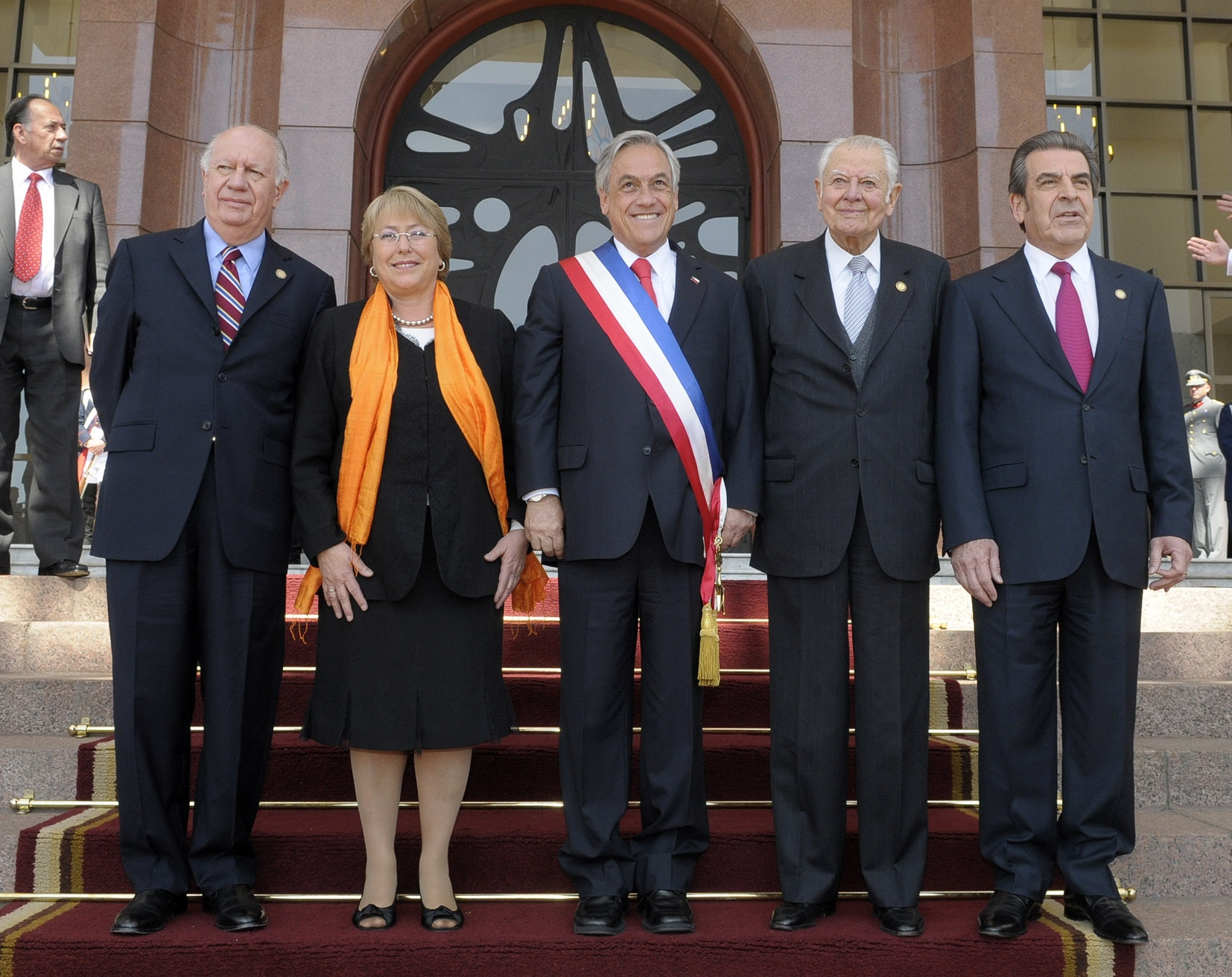
Five presidents of Chile since Transition to democracy (1990–2022), celebrating the Bicentennial of Chile

The Concertación coalition has continued to dominate Chilean politics for last two decades. In January 2006 Chileans elected their first female president, Michelle Bachelet, of the Socialist Party. She was sworn in on March 11, 2006, extending the Concertación coalition governance for another four years.

In 2002 Chile signed an association agreement with the European Union (comprising a free trade agreement and political and cultural agreements), in 2003, an extensive free trade agreement with the United States, and in 2004 with South Korea, expecting a boom in import and export of local produce and becoming a regional trade-hub. Continuing the coalition's free trade strategy, in August 2006 President Bachelet promulgated a free trade agreement with China (signed under the previous administration of Ricardo Lagos), the first Chinese free trade agreement with a Latin American nation; similar deals with Japan and India were promulgated in August 2007. In October 2006, Bachelet promulgated a multilateral trade deal with New Zealand, Singapore and Brunei, the Trans-Pacific Strategic Economic Partnership (P4), also signed under Lagos' presidency. Regionally, she has signed bilateral free trade agreements with Panama, Peru and Colombia.

After 20 years, Chile went in a new direction with the win of center-right Sebastián Piñera, in the Chilean presidential election of 2009–2010, defeating former President Eduardo Frei in the runoff.

On 27 February 2010, Chile was struck by an 8.8 M_{W} earthquake, the fifth largest ever recorded at the time. More than 500 people died (most from the ensuing tsunami) and over a million people lost their homes. The earthquake was also followed by multiple aftershocks. Initial damage estimates were in the range of US$15–30 billion, around 10 to 15 percent of Chile's real gross domestic product.

Chile achieved global recognition for the successful rescue of 33 trapped miners in 2010. On 5 August 2010, the access tunnel collapsed at the San José copper and gold mine in the Atacama Desert near Copiapó in northern Chile, trapping 33 men 700 metres (2,300 ft) below ground. A rescue effort organized by the Chilean government located the miners 17 days later. All 33 men were brought to the surface two months later on 13 October 2010 over a period of almost 24 hours, an effort that was carried on live television around the world.

Despite good macroeconomic indicators, there was increased social dissatisfaction, focused on demands for better and fairer education, culminating in massive protests demanding more democratic and equitable institutions. Approval of Piñera's administration fell irrevocably.

In 2013, Bachelet, a Social Democrat, was elected again as president, seeking to make the structural changes claimed in recent years by the society relative to education reform, tributary reform, same sex civil union, and definitely end the Binomial System, looking to further equality and the end of what remains of the dictatorship. In 2015 a series of corruption scandals (most notably Penta case and Caval case) became public, threatening the credibility of the political and business class.

On 17 December 2017, Sebastián Piñera was elected president of Chile for a second term. He received 36% of the votes, the highest percentage among all 8 candidates. In the second round, Piñera faced Alejandro Guillier, a television news anchor who represented Bachelet's New Majority (Nueva Mayoría) coalition. Piñera won the elections with 54% of the votes.

=== Estallido Social and Constitutional Referendum ===
In October 2019 there were violent protests about costs of living and inequality, resulting in Piñera declaring a state of emergency. On 15 November, most of the political parties represented in the National Congress signed an agreement to call a national referendum in April 2020 regarding the creation of a new Constitution. But the COVID-19 pandemic postponed the date of the elections, while Chile was one of the hardest hit nations in the Americas as of May 2020. On October 25, 2020, Chileans voted 78.28 per cent in favor of a new constitution, while 21.72 per cent rejected the change. Voter turnout was 51 per cent. A second vote was held on April 11, 2021, to select 155 Chileans who form the convention which will draft the new constitution.

On 19 December 2021, leftist candidate, the 35-year-old former student protest leader, Gabriel Boric, won Chile's presidential election to become the country's youngest ever leader, after the most polarizing election since democracy was restored, defeating right wing pinochetist and leader of the Chilean Republican Party José Antonio Kast. The center-left and center-right political conglomerates alternating power during the last 32 years (ex-Concertación and Chile Vamos) ended up in fourth and fifth place of the presidential election.

=== Gabriel Boric presidency (2022–2026) ===
On 11 March 2022, Gabriel Boric was sworn in as president to succeed outgoing President Sebastian Pinera. Out of 24 members of Gabriel Boric's female-majority Cabinet, 14 were women.

On 4 September 2022, voters rejected overwhelmingly the new constitution in the constitutional referendum, which was put forward by the constitutional convention and strongly backed by President Boric. Prior to the dismissal of the proposed constitution the issue of constitutional plurinationalism was noted in polls as particularly divisive in Chile. In May 2023, the far-right Republican Party became first in Chilean Constitutional Council election.The Republican party won 22 out of the 51 seats, with right-wing parties winning another 11 seats, in the assembly tasked with drawing up Chile's new constitution. In December 2023, Chilean voters rejected in a referendum a proposed new constitution drafted by a conservative-led committee.

On 14 December 2025, right-wing candidate José Antonio Kast won the governing left-wing coalition candidate, Jeanette Jara, in the second round of the presidential election with more than 58% of the vote .

=== José Antonio Kast presidency (2026- ) ===
On 11 March 2026, José Antonio Kast was sworn in as Chile’s president, meaning the most significant rightward shift in Chile since the return of democracy in 1990.

In August 2026, Chile left the Non-Aligned Movement (NAM), bringing an end to 55 years of membership in the bloc.

== See also ==
- Arauco War
- Chincha Islands War
- COVID-19 pandemic in Chile
- Economic history of Chile
- List of presidents of Chile
- Miracle of Chile
- Occupation of the Araucanía
- Politics of Chile
- Timeline of Chilean history
- U.S. intervention in Chile
- War of the Confederation
- War of the Pacific
- Criollo people
- History of Peru
- Constitutional history of Chile

General:

- History of the Americas
- History of Latin America
- History of South America
- Spanish colonization of the Americas
- History of Easter Island
