= Constitutional history of Chile =

The history of the Constitution of Chile dates from 1811. There were 10 constitutional texts and a draft for a federal organization in 1826. Its common elements are the unitary form of state and presidentialism as a form of government.

== Independence process ==
In this time, statutes pursued guaranteeing the autonomy of the Captaincy General of Chile before the Spanish Crown, and later gaining full independence and consolidating an institutional system. The first texts were only provisional decrees and later became more established normatives.

=== Old Fatherland ===
- Decree for the Provisional Executive Authority. It was redacted and approved by the National Congress. It was in force only in 1811, and derogated by a coup d'état.
- Constitutional Decree of 1812. It was approved during the government of José Miguel Carrera. It's viewed as an undisguised, independence declaration because it declared that no one order or act that was outside Chile could be legal, though the Constitutional Decree of 1812 recognized Ferdinand VII as King of Chile. It was derogated in 1813.
- Decree for the Provisional Government. It was enacted in 1814 and created the figure of Supreme Director and a seven-member Senate. Derogated when Chile was reconquered by Spain.

=== New Fatherland ===
After the victory over Royalist forces, the Bernardo O'Higgins rule was created:

- Provisional Constitution for the Chilean State (1818). It had 143 articles. This charter regulating rights and responsibilities of men in society, freedom, equality and property rights, and enshrined advanced social principles for the period. Executive power resided with the supreme director with multiple powers. The legislature was unicameral and consisted of a Senate of 5 members and alternates (all appointed by the supreme director) who should oversee the executive operations. The judiciary was directed by the Appeal Court and the Supreme Judiciary Court. Attributions of the supreme director, similar of a dictator, caused discomfort amongst his opponents, so a constituent assembly was convened (1822), where the constitution was reformed and a new one was created.
- Political Constitution of the Chilean State of 1822. With 248 articles (the largest constitution in the Chilean history). It was created by José Antonio Rodríguez Aldea. It was the first constitution that established a bicameral legislature, meanwhile, the figure of the supreme director as executive power remained, for a 6-year period, with a possibility of reelection for another 4 years. For the most part of the powerful Chilean ruling class, this fundamental charter made the O'Higgins government was intolerable; O'Higgins finally had to abdicate his office in January 1823, and in the final days of that year this constitution was replaced.

== Institutional adjustment period ==
After O'Higgins resignation, there was a time of "political learning" that produced many constitutional texts that failed to take hold due to successive political crises.

- Political and Permanent Constitution of Chilean State (1823). Known also as "moralist constitution", its principal creator was Mariano Egaña. His nickname "moralist" came by its normative characteristics that directed the activities of citizens, including private. For this reason and its difficult application in the society at that time, it was suspended in July 1824 and derogated in 1824 by the government of Ramón Freire.
- There was a set of Federal Acts in 1826, proposed by José Miguel Infante. Chile was divided into eight provinces with autonomy but without defining clear boundaries, resulting in conflicts between them. Acts were derogated in 1827 during Francisco Antonio Pinto rule.
- Constitution of Chile (1828). Called "liberal constitution" (as opposed to 1833 text), its ideologist was José Joaquín de Mora, joined with Santiago Concha. This text was used as a model for the subsequent constitutions. It noted that it was unenforceable, but problems arose following the 1829 election, to divide national politics between pipiolos (liberals) and pelucones (conservatives) in the presidential election, that later became a civil war that was a conservative victory. The legislature is exercised by a bicameral National Congress, with a Chamber of Deputies and a Senate. The executive branch consists of the president and vice president, which are elected by an indirect vote. The judiciary is filed in the Supreme Court, courts of appeal and courts of the first instance.

== Consolidated republic ==
After the end of the institutional crisis, Chile began to consolidate its political institutions, while living different influences throughout its history (conservatism, liberalism, populism, etc.).

In this period, texts are qualified as "authentic" constitutions in the sense that define the fundamental rights, establish the relationship between state and citizens, set and regulate the functions of branches of government and their authorities; mechanisms of law creation and constitutional reform. All texts define Chile as a unitary state, the president is both head of state and government, with a bicameral congress and independent judiciary.

- The Constitution of the Republic of Chile of 1833 (168 articles, with 7 transitional provisions). It was discussed and approved by a Great Convention in 1833 whose initial mission was to reform the 1828 chart. Written by a commission, on the basis of a draft proposed by Mariano Egaña, and with the outstanding participation of Egaña and Manuel Gandarillas. Approved and promulgated on 25 May 1833. Reformed in 1871, 1873, 1874, 1882, 1888, 1891, 1892 and 1893. It is the most lasting constitutional text in the history of Chile since only was replaced in 1925 after 92 years.
- The Constitution of the Republic of Chile of 1925 (110 articles and 10 transitory provisions). Its intellectual authors were Arturo Alessandri and José Maza Fernandez. It was called a Consultative Commission to report regarding the process for "reform" the Constitution of 1833, from which two subcommissions were formed, one of which prepared the draft, presided by Alessandri and with the participation of Maza. It was approved in the referendum of 30 August 1925, with a high abstention, and promulgated on 18 September of the same year. Entered into force on 18 October 1925, and reformed in 1943, 1957, 1959, 1963, 1967, 1969, 1970 and 1971. Its application was partially suspended by the coup of 11 September 1973, being amended and derogated in part by decree laws (called Actas Constitucionales, "Constitutional Acts"), until total replacement in 1981.
- The Constitution of the Republic of Chile of 1980 (120 articles, with 29 transitory provisions). In its creation were involved: the Ortúzar Commission led by Enrique Ortúzar, the Council of State -where share an important participation the former president Jorge Alessandri, president of the Council-, and the Military Junta. The text was approved in a referendum held on 11 September 1980 and entered into force on 11 March 1981. Reformed in 1989 (by referendum), 1991, 1994, 1997, 1999, 2000, 2001, 2003, 2005, 2007, 2008, 2009, 2010, 2011, 2012, 2013, 2014 and 2015 (by legislature process).
- The 2022 Proposed Political Constitution of the Republic of Chile, rejected in a plebiscite
- On Dec 17, 2023, the proposed Constitution drafted by an appointed committee was rejected by 56% vs 44%.

== See also ==
- Constitution of Chile

== Bibliography ==
- Bizzarro, Salvatore (2005). Historical Dictionary of Chile. Lanham, Maryland: The Scarecrow Press. ISBN 9780810865426.
- Collier, Simon; Sater, William (2004). A History of Chile, 1808-2002. Cambridge University Press. ISBN 9780521534840.
- Campos Harriet, Fernando (1999). Historia Constitucional de Chile. Santiago de Chile: Editorial Jurídica de Chile. Séptima edición, 2005. ISBN 956-10-0405-4.
- Carrasco Delgado, Sergio (1980 [2002]). Génesis y vigencia de los textos constitucionales chilenos (3.ª edición). Santiago de Chile: Editorial Jurídica de Chile. ISBN 956101405-X.
- Silva Bascuñán, Alejandro (1997). Tratado de Derecho Constitucional. Tomo III: La Constitución de 1980. Antecedentes y génesis. Santiago de Chile: Editorial Jurídica de Chile. ISBN 9561011786.
- Silva Galdames, Osvaldo (1995). Breve Historia Contemporánea de Chile. Santiago de Chile: Fondo de Cultura Económica.
- Soto Kloss, Eduardo (1996). Derecho Administrativo: bases fundamentales. Tomo II El Principio de Juridicidad. Santiago de Chile: Editorial Jurídica de Chile.
- Valencia Avaria, Luis (1986). Anales de la República: textos constitucionales de Chile y registro de los ciudadanos que han integrado los poderes ejecutivo y legislativo desde 1810 (2.ª edición). Santiago de Chile: Editorial Andrés Bello.
