= 1980 Chilean constitutional referendum =

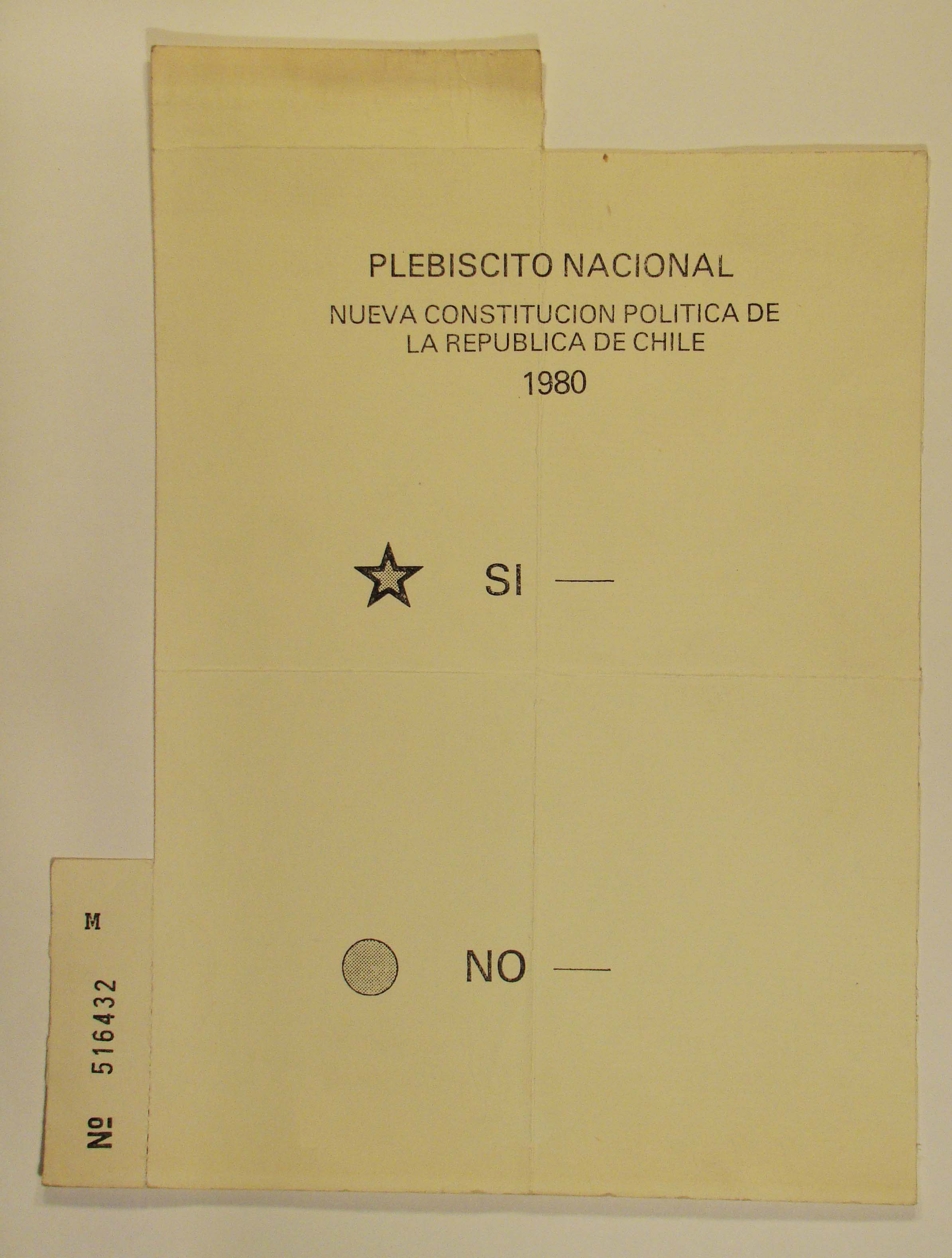
Original ballot

A constitutional referendum was held in Chile on 11 September 1980. The proposed new constitution would replace the 1925 constitution, and was approved by over two-thirds of voters.

The referendum was controversial, as Chile was then being ruled by a military dictatorship, and it ensured that Augusto Pinochet would remain in power with a rule by decree until 1988, after which he was peacefully removed from power following a popular referendum.

A referendum held in 2020 after waves of popular protests approved the drafting of a new constitution. In September 2022, the proposed left-wing document was rejected, 62% to 38%. Following a second process, in December 2023, a proposed right-wing replacement was rejected, 56% to 44%. These outcomes effectively guaranteed the 1980 charter would remain in effect.

== Background ==
Under the rule of Augusto Pinochet, the Ortúzar Commission (1973–1978) drafted a proposal for a new constitution.

== Electoral system ==
In the election, Chileans older than 18 years of age (including the illiterate and blind), as well as foreigners with legal residence in Chile older than 18 years of age who could prove their proper immigration status, were allowed to vote. Participation was obligatory except for those who were physically or mentally impaired or imprisoned.

To vote, the only document required was a certificate of identity issued by the Civil and Identification Registry Service. No electoral roll was prepared for the referendum, and the previous one was expired by means of a decree of the Military Junta issued on November 13, 1973 and that authorized the Directorate of the Electoral Registry to disable said files, which resulted in their destruction in July 1974.

== New constitution ==
The proposed new constitution gave the position of President of the Republic significant powers. It created some new institutions, such as the controversial National Security Council (COSENA). In its temporary dispositions, the document ordered the transition from the former military government, with Augusto Pinochet as President of the Republic, and the Legislative Power of the Government Junta (formed by the heads of the Navy, Air Force, National Police, and a representative of the Army, the head of the Army being President of the Republic), to a civil one, with a time frame of eight years, during which the legislative power would still be the Military Junta. It set the first eight-year presidential term for Pinochet, with a referendum in the eighth year, in which only one candidate, nominated by the Junta, would be up for acceptance.

The candidate, as expected, was Pinochet himself. While the steps to follow in the case of a triumph of the "yes" option, which the document clearly anticipated, were clearly delineated, the steps for the "no" triumph were less clear but still clear enough that no serious doubt emerged when the "no" option actually was victorious in the 1988 referendum.

Some of the 1980 constitution's original provisions, such as the presidential power of dissolving the Chamber of Deputies (the lower house of Congress) and serving eight-year terms with possibility of re-election, were modified or eliminated after 1990, when the country regained its democracy and the Congress was re-established.

== Results ==
The results supplied by the Colegio Escrutador Nacional (National Election Observer Association) were as follows. Blank votes were counted in favor of the "Yes" option.

Choice		Votes	%
For	For	4,121,067	67.58
For	Blank	83,812	1.37
For	Total	4,204,879	68.95
Against		1,893,420	31.05
Total		6,098,299	100.00
Valid votes		6,098,299	97.23
Invalid votes		173,569	2.77
Total votes		6,271,868	100.00
Registered voters/turnout		6,753,656	92.87

== Aftermath ==
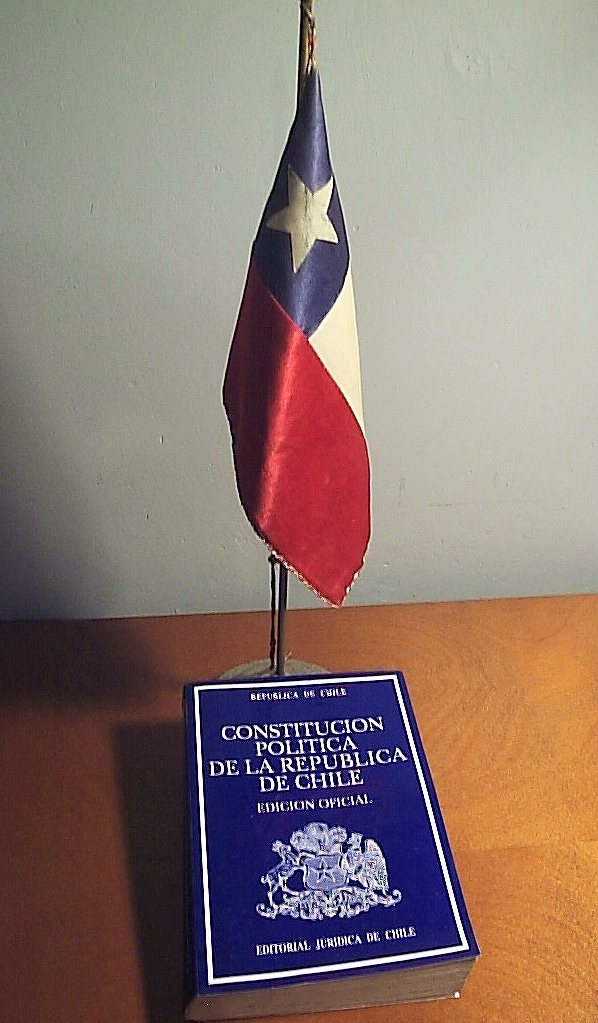
1980 constitution

The new constitution took effect on 11 March 1981. On this date a transition period of eight years began, during which General Pinochet, acting as President of the Republic and the Military Regime (Junta), exercised constituent and legislative power.

=== Accusations of fraud ===
The results of the referendum were disputed by the political opposition, headed by former senator Patricio Aylwin, and 46 other representatives, who argued that there had not been any electoral records and that the only anti-fraud measure was an ink mark on the thumb, which was easily removed. These criticisms were rejected by the National Scrutinizing College, made up of the Comptroller General of the Republic, Osvaldo Iturriaga; the minister of the Court of Appeals of Santiago, Arnoldo Dreyse; and the secretary of the Supreme Court, René Pica. In Antofagasta, former deputy and former mayor Juan Floreal Recabarren denounced the possibility of voting numerous times by removing the adhesive seal from his identity card (delivered when he voted for the first time that day) and cleaning his thumb of the ink. He was later detained by the authorities.

Other accusations of fraud are related to the fact that the mayors of the time (appointed by the dictatorship) held a lottery to define the members of each polling station, which were made up exclusively of supporters of the regime and collaborators belonging to large companies such as Soprole, Mingo, Neut Latour Forestal, Banco de Chile, BHC, Lan Chile, Banco Sud Americano and Embotelladora Andina, among others. The figure of the polling station representatives did not exist either, so the opposition did not have access to supervise the electoral process.

In December 1987, Cauce magazine published a report prepared by Eduardo Hamuy in conjunction with the Academy of Christian Humanism in which observations made at 981 polling stations in Greater Santiago on the day of the 1980 plebiscite were compiled, and numerous cases of fraud were found. Some of the reported cases include votes for "No" or invalid votes that were added to the "Yes" tally, people who voted more than once, a mismatch between the number of numbered stubs and the total number of votes cast, and scrutiny carried out without the presence of public observers, among other irregularities.

In June 2012, Jorgelino Vergara, a former agent of the Dirección de Inteligencia Nacional and National Information Center (Chile) agent, revealed that more than 3,000 members of that institution were ordered to vote more than once in the plebiscite, going to different polling places during the day.

== See also ==
- Constitutional history of Chile
- Chilean Constitution of 1833
- Chilean Constitution of 1925
- Chilean Constitution of 1980
