= Constitution of Chile =

The Constitution of Chile is the governing document that codifies the structure of the government of Chile.

The Chilean Constitution of 1980 is the current in-force constitution of Chile.

Previous actual or proposed constitutions of Chile include:

- Chilean Constitution of 1833, the constitution used from 1833 to 1925
- Chilean Constitution of 1925, the constitution used from 1925 to 1973
- The 2022 proposed Political Constitution of the Republic of Chile sought to replace the Chilean Constitution of 1980, but was rejected by a margin of 62% to 38%
