= Action of Rights Protection (Chile) =

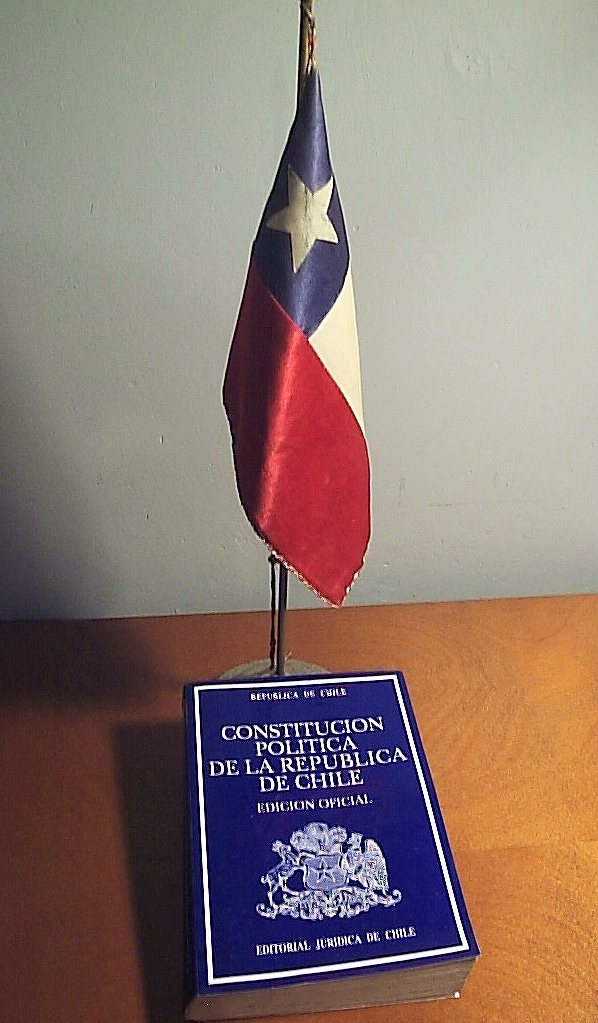
Chilean Constitution in front of a Chilean flag.

The Action of Rights Protection (in Spanish Recurso de Protección) is a judicial action established in Art. 20 of the Chilean Constitution, and follows that an Appellate Court makes orders to restore the rule of law and guarantee due protection of the constitutional rights of a person or people, in front of illegal or arbitrary acts and omissions that violate these rights.

This disposition provides that:

El que por causa de actos u omisiones arbitrarios o ilegales sufra privación, perturbación o amenaza en el legítimo ejercicio de los derechos y garantías establecidos en el artículo 19, números 1º, 2º, 3º inciso quinto, 4º, 5º, 6º, 9º inciso final, 11º, 12º, 13º, 15º, 16º en lo relativo a la libertad de trabajo y al derecho a su libre elección y libre contratación, y a lo establecido en el inciso cuarto, 19º, 21º, 22º, 23º, 24 °, y 25º podrá recurrir por sí o por cualquiera a su nombre, a la Corte de Apelaciones respectiva, la que adoptará de inmediato las providencias que juzgue necesarias para restablecer el imperio del Derecho y asegurar la debida protección del afectado, sin perjuicio de los demás derechos que pueda hacer valer ante la autoridad o los tribunales correspondientes.

"The one that due to arbitrary or illegal acts or omissions suffers deprivation, disturbance or threat in the legitimate exercise of the rights and guarantees established in article 19, numbers 1, 2nd, 3rd fifth paragraph, 4th, 5th, 6th, 9th final paragraph, 11th, 12th, 13th, 15th, 16th in relation to freedom of work and the right to its free choice and free contracting, and to the provisions of subsection fourth, 19th, 21st, 22º, 23rd, 24th and 25th, may resort to anyone in their name, to the respective Court of Appeals, which will immediately adopt the provisions that you judge necessary to restore the empire of the law and ensure the proper protection of the affected, without prejudice to the other rights that it may enforce the corresponding authority or courts."

— Chilean Constitution, art. 20

According with these characteristics, this trial is similar to the action known in Latin American countries as habeas corpus or Amparo, because both mechanisms (beyond procedural and substantial differences) are actions whose purpose is the protection of violated fundamental rights.

Two great legal sources that rules this jurisdictional action are, in the first place, art. 20 above and the Judicial Decree (Autoacordado) about processing of the Trial for the Protection of Constitutional Rights, issued by the Supreme Court in 1992 (modified in 2015 and 2018).

== Legal aspects ==
=== Trial characters ===
Regardless the denomination in article 20 of the Constitution, as "protection appeal" (recurso de protección), is not an appeal but a jurisdictional action. It is not an appeal because it does not seek to modify, revoke or cancel a judicial sentence. In fact, what is intended with this Rights Protection Action is to cause jurisdictional intervention in protection of the observance of constitutional rights. However, the Judicial Reglament dictated by the Supreme Court makes both expressions in art. 1º when saying: "The appeal or Rights Protection Action ..." ("el recurso o acción de protección...").

It is a specific emergency action, with a rapid and informal procedure. It has been said, in this sense, that it is a "precautionary action" or an "immediate precautionary action", since it is intended to guarantee the due protection of a constitutional right violated. According to this character, it has been added that it is necessary that the right that is said violated is "legitimate", that is, "that it melts in clear de facto situations that allow for this special procedure to restore the empire of the law; but it is inadmissible that through him a pronouncement on substantive situations is intended, which are of a larger trial".

However, some doctrine believes said qualification as wrong, because Rights Protection Action lacks necessary accessority that is typical of precautionary activity, how this class of action seeks the protection or guarantee of a right. What is often precautionary in protection is the sentence that hosts it, since it provides measures to precautionary the law or constitutional guarantee infringed; However, there are most Rights Protection Actions than the Court formulates a simple declaration.

=== Action, not Appeal ===
Just as about the nature of Rights Protection Action, it has been discussed about whether it develops in a jurisdictional process or not. In particular, it has been said in this regard that protection itself is a jurisdictional process; Others have argued that it is only a legal relationship that develops between an individual and the jurisdiction, following which it can take measures that affect third parties. Finally, there are those who think that it is a jurisdictional action that, as such, gives rise to a jurisdictional process.

== Standing ==
As in any jurisdictional action, in Rights Protection Action it is possible to distinguish an active standing, which refers to who can effectively exercise it; and a passive standing, that is, the person against whom he is operated.

=== Active standing ===
Rights Protection Action, as is established in Art. 20, could be actioned by the direct strained or any other person in their name.

When the affected person exerts the action, there is talk of an "ordinary standing", since who exercises it is, in turn, the one affected by the fact or omission to which tries to face; On the other hand, when the Rights Protection Action is exercised by any other person than the one affected, but in the name of this, we are facing an "extraordinary standing".

With respect to holders of this action, there is no discussion that both natural and legal persons are protected. Moreover, in many cases can be filed by a group or community of people, even if they are not constituted through an entity with their own legal personality.

In practice all these possibilities have been given; The only great limitation would be represented by the fact that "no one can claim a right generically, for simple love to it, but has to suffer impairment or a threat some specific person". Based on these ideas, the unprovable actions have been rejected in favor of indeterminate groups of people, arguing for it that "the appellant must express precisely on behalf of who resorts, since it is essential to prosper the action to determine who They are the object of the arbitrary or illegal act of the appealed", and discarding, in terms of art. 20, "any possibility of acting in the name of the company all or of the thousands of supposedly affected people, since neither one nor the others - taken as a whole - are holders of the action".

=== Passive standing ===
Passive standing of Rights Protection Action falls on the author of the illegal or arbitrary fact or omission that violated a constitutional guarantee. In this regard, Supreme Court Judicial Decree of 1992 contemplates the duty of Appeal Court called to know about the protection, to require report of people, officials or authority that, according to the appellant or in the concept of the Court, were causes of the fact or omission denounced.

That is why Courts have sued in most cases the determination of aggressor. However, in exceptional cases it has been declared that Rights Protection Action is not inadmissible for not indicating precisely the person or authority against which it is used. It has been said in this regard that constitutionally authorized the Appeal Court to adopt the measures that judge necessary to restore empire of the Law and ensure proper protection of the affected, does not see how the lack of determination of the aggressor can prevent the adoption of such measures. That has been the criteria to be used, for example, in the matter of kidnapping. In jurisprudence, this peculiar characteristic of the Rights Protection Action has been called "unilaterality".

== Elements of the Rights Protection Action ==
=== Illegal or arbitrary fact or omission ===
Starting, both illegality and arbitrariness are unlawful. It is commonly estimated that the illegal represents a formal contravention of legal and arbitrary text an absence of rational foundation, that is, a manifestation of the simple whim of agents. In case of an illegal or arbitrary omission, obviously, there must be legal obligation to do for the agent. Only then can a grievance be committed through inactivity.

Within the legal doctrine of Superior Courts of Chilean Justice, it has been indicated in this regard that "a fact is illegal when the regulations that must be governed or when an organ exercises exclusive powers in an improper way is not attended, contrary to the law,". It has been said that arbitrariness, on the other hand, "implies a lack of reasonableness in fact or omission; lack of proportion between means and the objective to be achieved; absence of adjustment between used means and the objective to be obtained or a non -existence of facts that support a decision".

=== Deprivation, disturbance or threat in the legitimate exercise of a right ===
Another requirement of the rights protection action consists in deprivation, disturbance or threat in the exercise of a right. On the meaning of each of these expressions, it has been established that depriving consists in "separating one of something or stripping it from a thing that possessed." Disturbing "it's equivalent to upset order and concert of things to their stillness and calm" and finally, threat must lead to imminent danger, bad future, that is, it must be "serious and not illusory, current, precise and not vague and concrete in its results.

=== Protected rights ===
According to art. 20, rights protected by this action are some of mentioned in art. 19 (indicated numerals):

- 1st.- Right to life and to the physical and psychic integrity of the person.
- 2nd.- Equality before the law.
- 3rd.- Right to natural judge. That is, that no one can be tried by expost courts (called comisiones especiales, "special commissions"), but by a court that will indicate the law and it will be established prior to the perpetration of the fact (the rights protection action only contemplates the fifth paragraph of this numeral, which corresponds to the natural judge). This subsection is usually confused with the right to due process, but the doctrine has understood that the latter is enshrined in the sixth paragraph of the same number.
- 4th.- Respect and protection of private life and the honor of the person and his family.
- 5th Inviolability of home and all forms of private communication.
- 6th.- Freedom of conscience, the manifestation of all beliefs and free exercise of all cults that do not oppose morality, good customs or public order.
- 9th.- Right to choose the health system, whether state or private.
- 11th.- Freedom of teaching.
- 12th.- Freedom of opinion and information, without prior censorship.
- 13th.- The right to meet peacefully without previous permission and without weapons.
- 15th.- Right of association without prior permission
- 16th.- Freedom of work and the right to its free choice and hiring. In addition, no kind of job can be forbidden, unless publicly opposed to public security or health, or that the national interest demands it and a law declares it.
- 19th.- Right to syndicate in cases and form indicated by law. Membership will always be voluntary.
- 21.- Right to develop any economic activity that is not contrary to morality, public order or national security, respecting legal norms that regulate it.
- 22.- Not arbitrary discrimination in treatment that State and its organizations give in economic matters.
- 23.- Freedom to acquire domain of all kind of goods, except those that nature has made common to all men or who must the law declares belong to people or state.
- 24.- Property law in all types over all kind of goods, tangible and intangible.
- 25.- Freedom to create and transmit arts, as well as the author's right over intellectual and artistic creations of any species, for the time indicated by law that will not be inferior to the owner's life.

== Trial ==
=== Competent court ===
The Rights Protection Action will be filed before the Court of Appeal in whose jurisdiction the arbitrary or illegal fact or omission was incurred that causes deprivation, disturbance or threat in the legitimate exercise of the respective constitutional guarantees.

=== Time ===
A problem that the deadline issue presents is those linked to the possibility of appealing against permanent facts and against those that occur over time.

1. Case of permanent damage. On this issue, legal doctrine has indicated that "the period begins to run when the activity or cause that produces the disorder is interrupted.".
2. Consecutive repetition of acts. In this regard, courts have indicated that the "period will begin to run from when the last of them was committed.".

=== Processing ===
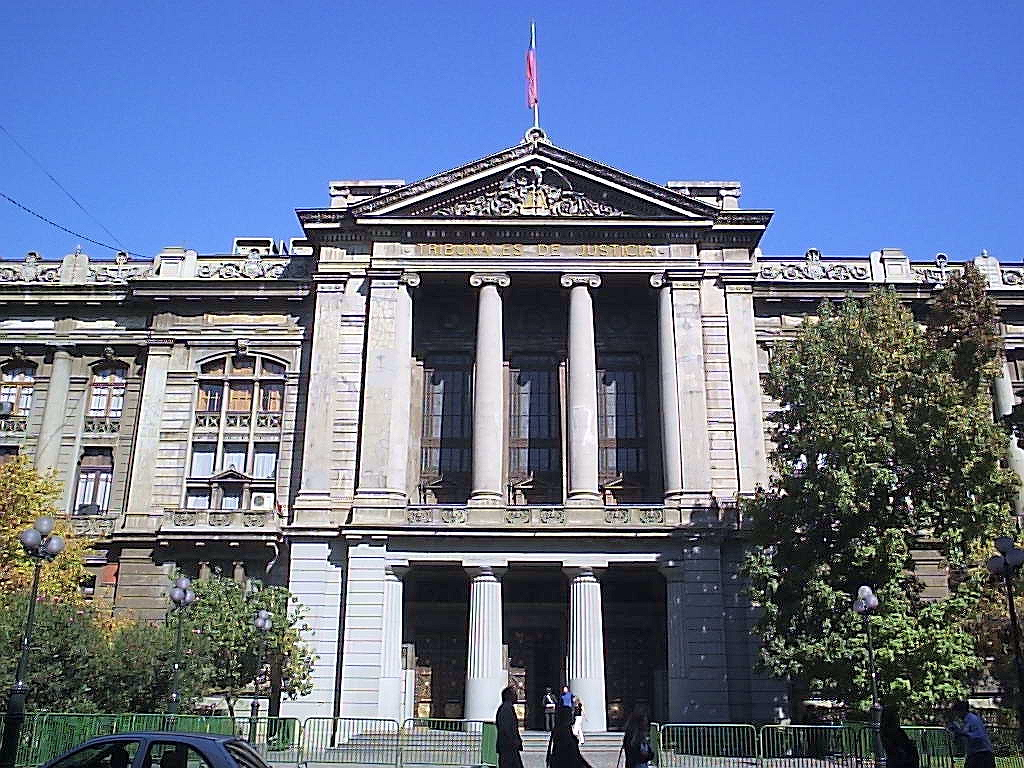
Supreme Court hears the appeal for rights protection in the second instance. In the image, the Court Palace (Palacio de los Tribunales de Justicia), in Santiago, a building that has housed the Supreme Court since 1915.

Once the lawsuit is processed, the Court of Appeal will order that it report, by means it deems most rapid and effective, the people, officials or authorities who, according to the action or, in opinion of the Court, are the cause of the arbitrary or illegal act or omission. that may have produced deprivation, disturbance or threat to free exercise of rights that are requested to be protected, setting a short and peremptory period to issue the report, noting that together with this, the obliged to evacuate it will send to the Court all antecedents in its power on the subject matter of the action.

The Court, when it deems it appropriate for purposes of the action, may decree an order for not innovating (orden de no innovar), that are measures aimed at preserving the factual or legal situation presented at the time of admission of the claim, in relation to people and assets included in the process. Likewise, for the best accuracy of the Court decision, all arrangements that Court deems necessary may be ordered.

Once report and required background information have been received, or even without them, the Court will order to put the trial in revision (autos en relación) and will order to extraordinarily add the case to the order table of the second following day, after drawing lots, when in the respective Court of Appeal there is than one chamber.

Court will evaluate in accordance with the rules of sound criticism (sana crítica) the background information that accompanies the action and others that are added during the trial. The judgment will be notified personally or by a notification table (estado diario) to who filed the appeal and to the respondents who have become part of it.

=== Appeal ===
An appeal may be filed against the ruling of the Court of Appeal before the Supreme Court within a period of 5 days, counted from the time stand actors are notified personally or by the notification table of the judgement. The cassation appeal is not admissible. Now, the Supreme Court, in order to hear the appeal or for the best judgment of the ruling, may request from any authority or person the background information it considers necessary for its resolution.

== Ruling of Rights Action ==
The purpose of the ruling that accepts the rights protection action is providing measures that the Court deems appropriate to restore the rule of law and guarantee due protection of the affected person.

=== Ruling effectiveness ===
Like any sentence, that grants protection only produces inter-partes effectiveness, only reaches those who have been part of the action. However, in exceptional cases, there has been an ultra-parte effectiveness of the sentence, thereby benefiting people who have not acted in the trial. This happened, for example, in 1978 when the Court of Appeal of Santiago accepted protection suit deduced by an individual for the benefit of his individual right, but accepted it with respect to the entire affected population. And, consequently, it ordered the company to replace, in the shortest possible time, a technically insufficient transformer in a sector of the population, since its maintenance "implies establishing an arbitrary difference in relation to a certain sector that, just as the others pay the corresponding supply"..

Likewise, in 1993, a protection appeal was filed by a student against the increase in the school bus fare. It was understood by the Court that this situation violated the property right (art. 19, No. 24 CPR) of the appellant; Consequently, the agreement adopted by the respondent was declared illegal, it was ordered to annul said increase and to continue charging a value that did not exceed the maximum percentage determined by the transportation authority of the price of an adult passenger.. Here, as can be seen, the satisfaction of the appellant's interest also involved the satisfaction of the interest of all the other users of said transportation system who paid the student fare.

=== Res iudicata ===
The Constitution rule says nothing regarding authority of res judicata that must be recognized in the protection sentence. For the majority of the Chilean doctrine, along Eduardo Soto Kloss thesis, to determine effects of res judicata in the protection action, attention must be paid to the favorable or unfavorable result of the sentence. If the appellant obtained a favorable ruling, substantial res judicata occurs; otherwise, only formal res judicata is achieved.

However, the consensus now has been reached that sentence reaches formal res judicata regardless of its content, whether it is favorable or not for the affected party. This idea basically rests on the precautionary nature of the protection action and the existence of a confluence of legal actions in the expression "without prejudice to the other rights that may be asserted before the corresponding authority or courts" used in art. 20. In effect, if the protection action leaves other actions safe, then this explains, for example, that the loser in a protection appeal related to the right of property can reverse this ruling by exercising an estate lawsuit that recognizes his right in a subsequent process.

== See also ==
- Habeas Corpus
- Human Rights
- Constitutional Law

== Bibliography ==
- Bordalí Salamanca, Andrés, "El proceso de protección", en Revista de Derecho, Valdivia Universidad Austral de Chile, t. X, 1999, pp. 43–58.
- Errázuriz, J. M. y Otero, J.M., Aspectos procesales del recurso de protección, Ed. Jurídica de Chile, 1989.
- Nogueira Alcalá, Humberto, Dogmática Constitucional, Edit. Univ. de Talca, 1997.
- Paillás, Enrique, El recurso de protección ante el derecho comparado, Ed. Jurídica de Chile, 1997.
- Ríos, Lautaro, "El recurso de protección y sus innovaciones procesales", en Gaceta Jurídica N.º 171 (1992).
- Romero Seguel, Alejandro, La cosa juzgada en el proceso civil chileno. Doctrina y jurisprudencia. Edit. Jurídica de Chile, 2002
- Soto Kloss, Eduardo, Recurso de protección. Orígenes, doctrina y jurisprudencia. Ed. Jurídica de Chile, 1982.
- Tavolari Oliveros, Raúl, "Tramitación de la acción constitucional chilena de protección", en su Proceso en acción, Ed. Libromar, Valparaíso, 2000.
- Verdugo, Mario y Pfeffer, Emilio, Derecho Constitucional, tomo I, Ed. Jurídica de Chile, 2002.
