= Héctor Castro Castro =

Chilean politician (born 1933)

Member of the Chamber of Deputies of Chile
- In office May 1973 – 11 September 1973

Personal details
- Born: 1 January 1933 Quillota, Chile
- Party: Christian Democratic Party
- Parent(s): Héctor Castro Medina; Graciela Castro Torres
- Education: Pontifical Catholic University of Valparaíso (LL.B)
- Profession: Lawyer

Héctor Castro Castro (born 1933) is a Chilean politician who has served as ambassador and has worked for the Ministry of Foreign Affairs.

== Biography ==
=== Early life ===
Castro Castro attended the Marist Institute of Quillota. Then, he joined the Pontifical Catholic University of Valparaíso to do his Bachelor of Laws (LL.B), which he obtained in 1964.

In his university time, Castro Castro joined the Christian Democratic Party (PDC).

=== Political career ===
Before being deputy, he was Provincial Vice President at the PDC. Then, when he was 40 in 1973, Castro Castro was elected deputy for the 1973−1977 in representation of Imperial, Quillota, Limache and Casablanca. In that period, he was a member of the permanent commission on Labor and Social Security.

On 11 September 1973, his legislative period was suspended as a result of the 1973 military coup which overthrew Salvador Allende's government and suspended the 1925 Constitution.
