= Chilean Constitution of 1980 =

Constitution of Chile

The Political Constitution of the Republic of Chile of 1980 (Spanish: Constitución Política de la República de Chile) is the fundamental law in force in Chile. It was approved and promulgated under the military dictatorship headed by Augusto Pinochet, being ratified by the Chilean citizenry through a referendum on September 11, 1980, although being held under restrictions and without electoral registers. While 69% of the population was reported to have voted yes, the vote was questioned by hundreds of denunciations of irregularities and fraud. The constitutional text took effect, in a transitory regime, on March 11, 1981, and then entered into full force on March 11, 1990, with the return to electoral democracy. It was amended for the first time in 1989 (through a referendum), and afterward in 1991, 1994, 1997, each year from 1999 to 2001, 2003, each year from 2007 to 2015, and each year from 2017 to 2021, with the last three amendments concerning the constituent process of 2020–2022. In September 2005, under Ricardo Lagos's presidency, a large amendment of the Constitution was approved by parliamentarians, removing from the text some of the less democratic dispositions coming from Pinochet's regime, such as senators-for-life and appointed senators, as well as the armed forces' warranty of the democratic regime.

On November 15, 2019, following a series of popular protests in October 2019, a political agreement between parties with parliamentary representation called for a national referendum on the proposal of writing a new Constitution and on the mechanism to draft it. A plebiscite held on October 25, 2020, approved drafting a new fundamental charter, as well as choosing by popular vote delegates to a Constitutional Convention which was to fulfill this objective. The members of the convention were elected in May 2021, and first convened on July 4, 2021. However, on September 4, 2022, voters rejected the new constitution in the constitutional referendum. Following the rejection, the Expert Commission drafted another new constitution for the Constitutional Council to amend. However, on December 15, 2023, voters rejected the constitution in the 2023 Chilean constitutional referendum.

== Background ==
The Commission for the Study of the New Political Constitution of the Republic of Chile', commonly known as the Ortúzar Commission', was a body established in 1973 by the Military Government Junta that ruled the country during the military dictatorship of Augusto Pinochet, following the coup against the Socialist President Salvador Allende. Its purpose was to draft the preliminary project for the 1980 Constitution. It met from September 24, 1973, to October 5, 1978. The name "Ortúzar Commission" is due to its chairman, Enrique Ortúzar Escobar, who previously served as Minister of Justice and Minister of Foreign Affairs during the administration of Jorge Alessandri.

The following people were part of the commission: Rafael Eyzaguirre Echeverría (secretary), Sergio Diez Urzúa, Enrique Evans de la Cuadra, Jaime Guzmán Errázuriz, Gustavo Lorca Rojas, Jorge Ovalle Quiroz, Alejandro Silva Bascuñán, Alicia Romo Román, Raúl Gormaz Molina and later on Luz Bulnes Aldunate, Raúl Bertelsen Repetto, Juan de Dios Carmona.

Despite what is commonly believed, the Ortúzar Commission was not a constituent assembly and did not draft the 1980 Constitution; rather, it merely prepared a preliminary draft that was subsequently reviewed by the Council of State and the Government Junta before being formally submitted for popular approval via a plebiscite.

Nevertheless, there is no denying the importance of the discussion carried out by the Ortúzar Commission regarding the final text of the 1980 Constitution. Although many of the commission's proposals were not adopted by the Council of State and the Government Junta, a large portion of the new Constitution's text was analyzed and debated within the commission.

== Legitimacy ==
According to the law professor Camel Cazor Aliste, the Constitution of 1980 has problems of legitimacy stemming from two facts. First, the constitutional commission was not representative of the political spectrum of Chile: its members had been handpicked by the Pinochet dictatorship, and opponents of the regime had been deliberately excluded. Secondly, the constitution's approval was achieved by the government in a controversial and tightly controlled referendum in 1980. Campaigning for the referendum was irregular, with the government calling people to vote positively on the reform, and also using radio and television commercial spots, while the opposition urging people to vote negatively were only able of doing small public demonstrations, without access to television time and limited radio access. There was no electoral roll for this vote, as the register had been burned during the dictatorship. There were multiple cases of double voting, with at least 3000 CNI agents doing so.

Since the return to democracy, the constitution has been amended nearly 70 times.

A document from September 13, 1973, shows that Jaime Guzmán had by then already been tasked by the Junta to study the creation of a new constitution.

It has been argued the 1980 Constitution was designed to favor the election of right-wing legislative majorities. Several rounds of constitutional amendments have been enacted since 1989 to address this concern.

A referendum held in 2020 after waves of popular protests approved the drafting of a new constitution. In September 2022, a proposed left-wing replacement constitution was rejected, 62% to 38%. Following a second process, in December 2023, a proposed right-wing replacement was also rejected, 55.8% to 44.2%. These outcomes granted the right-wing to establish a narrative legitimising the 1980 Constitution.

== Attempted replacement ==
In July 2022, a proposed replacement constitution was submitted for national debate and general referendum, but it was rejected on September 4 despite having had the support of left-leaning President Gabriel Boric. The document had faced intense criticism that it was "too long, too left-wing and too radical", and was rejected by a margin of 62% to 38%.

On March 6, 2023, a group of experts appointed by Congress began a second attempt to prepare a preliminary draft of a new constitution. The group, with lawyer Veronica Undurraga serving as its president, was scheduled to work for three months on 12 institutional bases agreed to by lawmakers, after which the draft would be given to an elected Constitutional Council, whose members would be voted upon on May 7, 2023. At the same time, a 14-member Technical Admissibility Committee began serving as arbitrator.

On December 17, 2023, Chileans voted 55.8% to 44.2% against the second proposed constitution. President Boric stated that he would not seek a third referendum; this outcome effectively guaranteed the 1980 charter would remain in effect.

== See also ==
- Constitutional history of Chile
- Chilean Constitution of 1833
- Chilean Constitution of 1925
- Chilean transition to democracy
- 2021 Chilean Constitutional Convention election
- 2023 Chilean Constitutional Council election
- Constitutionalism
- Action of Rights Protection (Chile)
