= Caunce =

Caunce is a surname. Notable people with the surname include:

- Lewis Caunce (1911–1978), English footballer
- Steve Caunce, English businessman, CEO of AO World

== See also ==
- Cauce
