= Luz Bulnes =

Chilean lawyer (1927–2019)

Luz Bulnes Aldunate (Note: In this Chilean name, the first or paternal surname is Bulnes and the second or maternal family name is Aldunate.) (11 August 1927 – 24 September 2019) was a Chilean lawyer who was a member of the Constitutional Court and the Ortúzar Commission.
