= Cauce =

Cauce is a surname. Notable people with the surname include:

- Ana Mari Cauce (born 1956), American psychologist and college administrator
- Elīza Cauce (born 1990), Latvian luger

== See also ==
- Caunce
