= Bulnes =

Bulnes may refer to:

== People ==
- Eduardo Pérez Bulnes (1785–1851), Argentine statesman
- Francisco Bulnes (politician) (1847–1924), Mexican intellectual
- Manuel Bulnes (1799–1866), Chilean military and political figure
- Manuel Bulnes Pinto (1842–1899), Chilean military and political figure

== Places and structures ==
- Bulnes (Buenos Aires Underground), a station in Argentina
- Bulnes (Cabrales), a parish in Asturias, Spain
- Bulnes, Chile, a city and commune in Ñuble Region, Chile
- Bulnes, England, historical name of the town of Bowness-on-Windermere

== See also ==
- Fuerte Bulnes, a fort in Patagonia, Chile
- Juan Francisco Bulnes, a municipality in Honduras
- Naranjo de Bulnes, a limestone peak in Asturias, Spain
