= Ortúzar Commission =

Chilean commission that made the preliminary draft of the 1980 Constitution

Commission for the Study of the New Political Constitution of the Republic of Chile, commonly known as the Ortúzar Commission, was a body established in 1973 by the Military Government Junta that ruled the country during the military dictatorship of Augusto Pinochet, following the coup against the Socialist President Salvador Allende. Its purpose was to draft the preliminary project for the 1980 Constitution. It met from September 24, 1973, to October 5, 1978.

== Members ==
The name "Ortúzar Commission" is due to its chairman, Enrique Ortúzar Escobar, who previously served as Minister of Justice and Minister of Foreign Affairs during the administration of Jorge Alessandri.

Also on the commission were:

- Rafael Eyzaguirre Echeverría (secretary)
- Sergio Diez Urzúa
- Enrique Evans de la Cuadra
- Jaime Guzmán Errázuriz
- Gustavo Lorca Rojas
- Jorge Ovalle Quiroz
- Alejandro Silva Bascuñán
- Alicia Romo Román
- Raúl Gormaz Molina

Enrique Evans and Alejandro Silva resigned on March 16 and 22, 1977, respectively. On May 24 of the same year, Jorge Ovalle also stepped down. They were replaced on June 9, 1977, by:

- Luz Bulnes Aldunate
- Raúl Bertelsen Repetto
- Juan de Dios Carmona

== Nature ==
Despite what is commonly believed, the Ortúzar Commission was not a constituent assembly and did not draft the 1980 Constitution; rather, it merely prepared a preliminary draft that was subsequently reviewed by the Council of State and the Government Junta before being formally submitted for popular approval via a plebiscite.

Nevertheless, there is no denying the importance of the discussion carried out by the Ortúzar Commission regarding the final text of the 1980 Constitution. Although many of the commission's proposals were not adopted by the Council of State and the Government Junta, a large portion of the new Constitution's text was analyzed and debated within the commission.
