= Raúl Bertelsen Repetto =

Chilean lawyer

Raúl Bertelsen

Personal details
- Born: 18 March 1945 (age 81) Valparaíso, Chile
- Education: Pontifical Catholic University of Valparaíso (BA); University of Navarra (PhD)
- Profession: Lawyer

Raúl Bertelsen Repetto (born 18 March 1945) is a Chilean lawyer and president of the Constitutional Court of Chile and part of the Ortúzar Commission.
