= 1925 Chilean constitutional referendum =

A constitutional referendum was held in Chile on 30 August 1925. Voters were offered a choice of two draft constitutions; one prepared by a subcommission and supported by President Arturo Alessandri, and the other prepared by Congress. A large majority voted for the version supported by Alessandri and the resulting constitution provided a period of stability and a reduction in the power of the previous conservative oligarchy.

== Proposals ==
The subcommission's draft provided for a presidential system in which the President is directly elected. The President would not be allowed to dissolve Congress, and could be removed from office by a majority vote in the Chamber of Deputies and a two-thirds majority in the Senate. Members of Congress would not be allowed to serve as government ministers, and the State Council would be abolished. Provincial Assemblies would be established, and church and state would be separated.

The Congressional draft would have allowed the President to be removed from office by the vote of an absolute majority in both houses of Congress, and give Congress oversight over the state budget.

== Electoral system ==
Voters cast a blue ballot for the subcommission draft, a red ballot for the Congressional draft, and a white ballot for neither. Invalid or blank votes could not be cast.

== Results ==
Choice	Votes	%
Subcommission draft	127,483	94.84
Congressional draft	5,448	4.05
Against both	1,490	1.11
Total	134,421	100.00
Registered voters/turnout	296,259	–
Source: Direct Democracy

== Aftermath ==
Following the referendum, presidential elections were held on 24 October and Congressional elections on 22 November.
