= Chilean Constitution of 1833 =

Fundamental law of Chile from 1833 to 1925

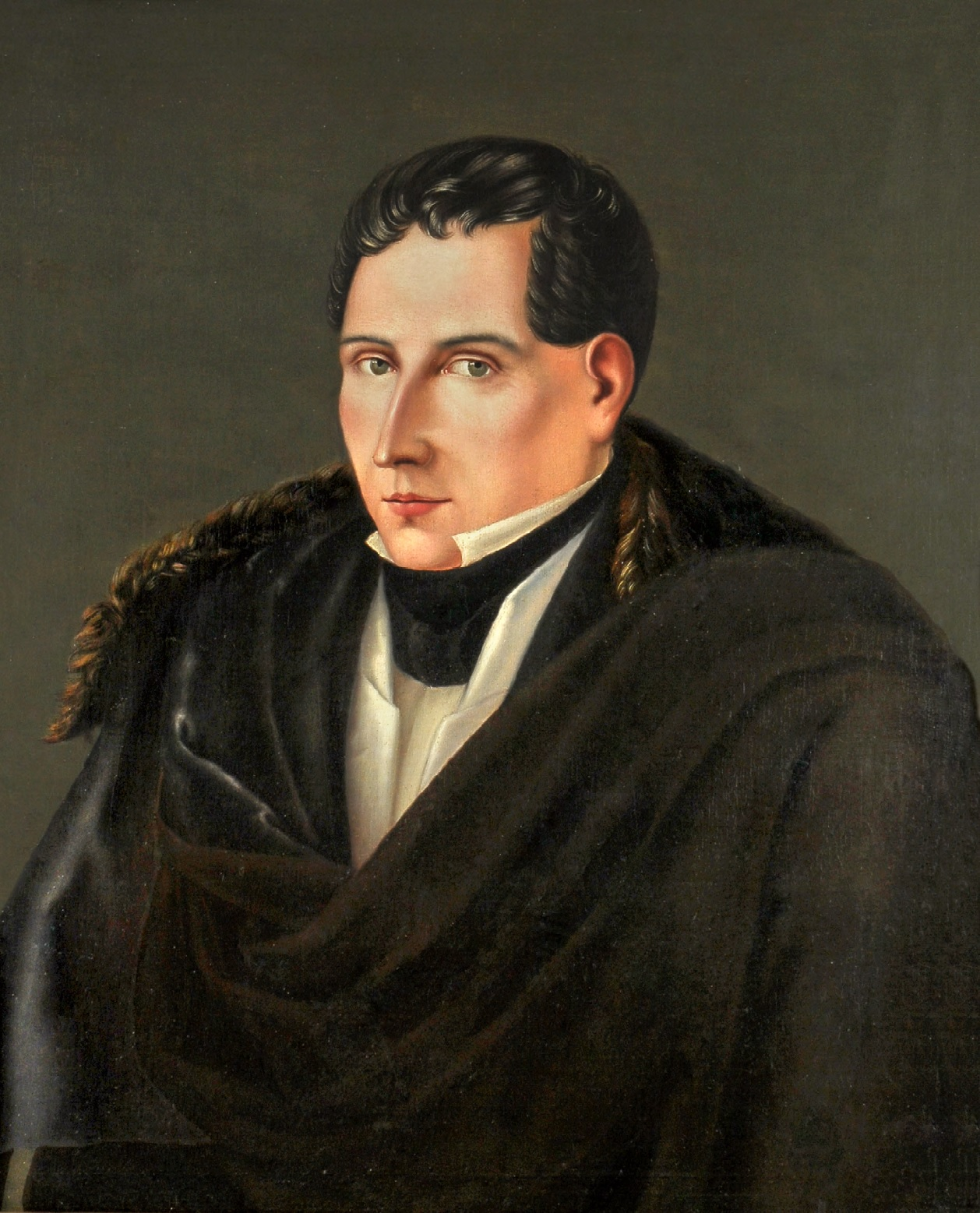
Painting of Diego Portales. The Constitution of 1833 has been seen as the embodiement of the "Portalian thought".

The Constitution of 1833 was the constitution used in Chile from 1833 to 1925 when it was replaced by the Constitution of 1925. One of the most long-lived constitutions of Latin America, it was used to endorse both an authoritarian, presidential system and from 1891 onwards an oligarchic, parliamentary system.

The constitution emerged after the Chilean Civil War of 1829 in which the conservative Pelucones (Whigs) defeated the Pipiolos (liberals). Its main ideologues where Mariano Egaña, Manuel José Gandarillas and Diego Portales all of whom saw from a conservative point of view the necessity of a unitarian state under a strong leadership. The constitution placed a lot of power in the hands of the presidency who had absolute power to appoint a cabinet, as well as power to appoint other senior positions in consultation with the legislature or the Council of State (which the president appointed). The president had extensive emergency powers. The constitution made Catholicism the state religion and forbade the practise of other religions, both in public and private life.

The first president to be elected under the constitution was General José Joaquín Prieto. The constitution allowed for two consecutive five-year terms and a third-term after an intervening term. This resulted in three consecutive conservative presidents ruling Chile, each for ten years. Mariano Egaña had initially aimed at not putting any restriction on reelection.

The constitution limited voting rights to literate males over the age of 21 (25 if unmarried) with fixed property, trading capital, or an income from a craft or trade.

Chilean liberals considered the constitution authoritarian and made attempts to overthrow the government. During the failed Revolution of 1851 liberals in La Serena declared the constitution abolished. After the first liberal 10-year government, the constitution was amended in 1871 to eliminate reelections.

After the 1891 Chilean Civil War the constitution was amended in 1891, 1892 and 1893, and was interpreted to endorse a parliamentary system. Chilean historiography refers to this period as the "pseudo-parliamentary epoch".

It was not until the turmoils of the 1920s that the constitution was replaced by the Constitution of 1925.

== See also ==
- Constitutional history of Chile
- Chilean Constitution of 1925
- Chilean Constitution of 1980
- Liberal Party (Chile)
- Chilean Civil Code
