= Chilean Constitution of 1925 =

Constitution of the Republic of Chile
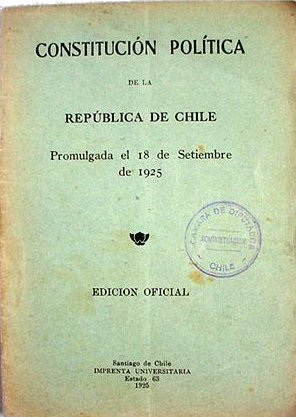

Overview
- Original title: Constitución Política de la República de Chile
- Jurisdiction: Territory of Chile
- Created: July of 1925
- Ratified: August 30, 1925
- Date effective: October 18, 1925
- System: Presidentialism
- Head of state: President of the Republic
- Chambers: Senate; Chamber of Deputies
- Executive: President; Vice President; Ministres of State
- Judiciary: Supreme Court and the Public Ministry
- Electoral college: Election Certification Court

History
- Repealed: March 11, 1981 (de facto suspended from 11 September 1973)
- Amendments: 10
- Last amended: 1971
- Authors: José Maza Fernández and the Subcommittee on Reform
- Signatories: Arturo Alessandri and his cabinet
- Supersedes: Constitution of 1833

The Constitution of 1925 was the constitution in force in Chile between 1925 and 1973 when the Government Junta suspended it. In the 1920s Chile had a severe social and economic crisis that led to the loss of prestige for old ruling class, labeled oligarchy in Chilean historiography, and the rise of a more sensibilized populist government led by Arturo Alessandri. In 1924 Alessandri was outed in a coup, but was called back in 1925 to complete his mandate. Alessandri then used his presidency to draft a new constitution to replace the Constitution of 1833.

The constitution was approved by plebiscite by 134,421 voters on August 30 of 1925. Prominent features of the constitution were:

- Separation of the church from the state. This was the fulfillment of an old goal among many liberals in Chile. This issue had caused a series of conflicts and controversies in the 19th century.
- Legislative initiative powers to the president. (Reinforced with subsequent reforms)
- Created an electoral tribunal. This reform increased the democratization of elections that were still manipulated in large parts of the country.

== Principal reforms ==
- 1943: Creation of Comptroller General of Chile (Contraloría General de la República)
- 1963: Authorization of the Agrarian Land Reform (reinforced in 1967).
- 1970: Creation of Constitutional Court
- 1970: Democratic Guarantee Statute, to ensure better democratic freedoms
- 1971: Total nationalization of copper

== See also ==
- Constitutional history of Chile
- Chilean Constitution of 1833
- Chilean Constitution of 1980
