= 1891 in Chile =

- Decades: 1870s; 1880s; 1890s; 1900s; 1910s
- See also: Other events of 1891; Timeline of Chilean history

Events in the year 1891 in Chile.

== Incumbents ==
- President: Jose Manuel Balmaceda until August, Jorge Montt after August

== Events ==
- January 18-September 16 - Chilean Civil War of 1891
- March 6 - Battle of Pozo Almonte
- April 23 - Battle of Caldera Bay
- May 6 - Itata Incident: the steamer Itata is detained in San Diego on orders of United States State Department official John W. Foster
- May 7 - Itata Incident: The Itata leaves San Diego for Chile
- May 16 - Itata Incident: USS Charleston, a warship sent after the Itata, arrives in the Mexican port of Acapulco without finding the Itata
- June 4 - United States Navy admiral George Brown convinces the Congressionalist Junta to give up the Itata.
- July 3 - The vessel Maipo arrived in Iquique with arms and munitions for the Congressionalist Junta
- August 21 - Battle of Concón
- August 28 - Battle of Placilla

== Deaths ==
- August 28 - Orozimbo Barbosa (born 1838)
- September 19 - Jose Manuel Balmaceda, President of Chile (born 1840)
