= Chilean cruiser Esmeralda (1883) =

Protected cruiser

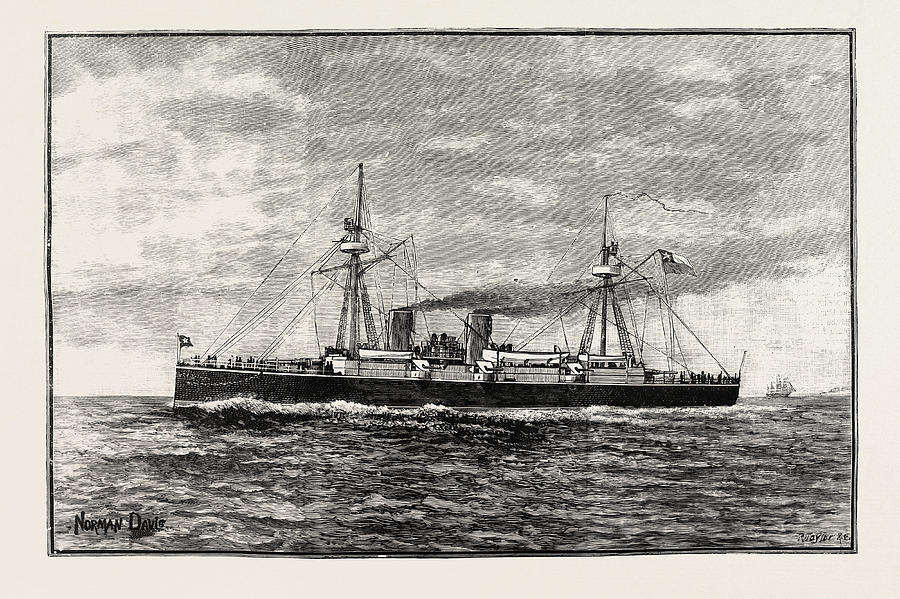
- Illustration of Esmeralda by Norman Davis for the Illustrated London News, 1891

History

Chile
- Name: Esmeralda
- Namesake: Chilean corvette Esmeralda
- Builder: Armstrong Mitchell, Elswick, United Kingdom
- Yard number: 429
- Laid down: 5 April 1881
- Launched: 6 June 1883
- Completed: 15 July 1884
- Fate: Sold to Japan, 1894

Empire of Japan
- Renamed: Izumi
- Namesake: Izumi Province
- Stricken: 1 April 1912
- Fate: Scrapped

General characteristics
- Type: Protected cruiser
- Displacement: 2,950 long tons (2,997 t)
- Length: 270 ft (82 m) (pp)
- Beam: 42 ft (13 m)
- Draft: 18 ft 6 in (6 m)
- Installed power: 4 double-ended fire-tube boilers; 6,803 ihp (5,073 kW)
- Propulsion: 2 compound steam engines; 600 tons coal, max
- Speed: 18.3 knots (33.9 km/h; 21.1 mph)
- Complement: 296
- Armament: 2 × 10 in (254 mm)/30; 6 × 6 in (152 mm)/26; 2 × 6 pdr (2.25 in (57 mm)) guns; 5 × 37 mm (1.5 in) revolving cannon
- Armor: Up to 1 in (25 mm) deck armor

The Chilean cruiser Esmeralda was the first protected cruiser, a ship type named for the arched armored deck that protected vital areas like propulsion machinery and ammunition magazines. The British shipbuilder Armstrong Mitchell constructed Esmeralda in the early 1880s, and the company's founder hailed the new ship as "the swiftest and most powerfully armed cruiser in the world". After it entered service, the Chileans deployed Esmeralda to Panama in 1885 to show the flag during an emerging crisis in the region. The cruiser was later used to support the Congressionalist cause during the 1891 Chilean Civil War.

In 1894, Esmeralda was sold to Japan via Ecuador. Renamed Izumi, (Note: This Japanese name has also been transliterated as Idzumi.) the cruiser arrived too late to participate in the major naval battles of the 1894–1895 First Sino-Japanese War. It did see active service in the 1904–1905 Russo-Japanese War, where it contributed to a decisive Japanese victory in the Battle of Tsushima by being one of the first ships to make visual contact with the opposing fleet. In 1912, the aging Izumi was decommissioned and stricken from the Imperial Japanese Navy.

== Design ==
=== Background ===
Esmeralda was designed and constructed in an era of rapidly advancing naval technology. Earlier cruisers were often constructed primarily of wood and nearly all carried the masts and rigging required for sailing; Esmeralda was built of steel and was not rigged for sailing. As such, historians have called it the first protected cruiser, a ship type characterized by its use of an arched armored deck to protect vital areas like propulsion machinery and ammunition magazines.

The rise of protected cruisers accompanied that of the French Jeune École naval theory, which catered to nations in a position of naval inferiority. As historian Arne Røksund has said, "one of the fundamental ideas in the Jeune École's naval theory [was] that the weaker side should resort to alternative strategies and tactics, taking advantage of the possibilities opened up by technological progress." To accomplish this, Jeune École adherents called for the construction of small, steam-powered, heavy-gunned, long-ranged, and higher-speed warships to counter the capital ship-heavy strategy of major navies and devastate their merchant shipping.

Within the Chilean context, Esmeralda was ordered in the midst of the 1879–1884 War of the Pacific, fought between Chile and an alliance of Bolivia and Peru. As moving goods and supplies in the region was far easier by sea, control of that would likely determine the victor. As a result, both sides rushed to acquire new and old warships in Europe even while Austria-Hungary, France, Germany, the Ottoman Empire, and the United Kingdom were determined to remain neutral in the conflict. Esmeralda was the most capable of these ships, and although British neutrality meant that it could not be delivered until after the war's conclusion, the Chileans ordered it with the intention of gaining long-term naval superiority over their neighbors.

Esmeralda was designed by the British naval architect George Wightwick Rendel, who developed it from his plans for the earlier Japanese cruiser Tsukushi, laid down in 1879. (Note: Like Esmeralda, Tsukushi was constructed by the British shipbuilder Armstrong for Chile. With victory in sight in the War of the Pacific, it was sold to Japan in 1883 instead.)

=== Publicity and reactions ===
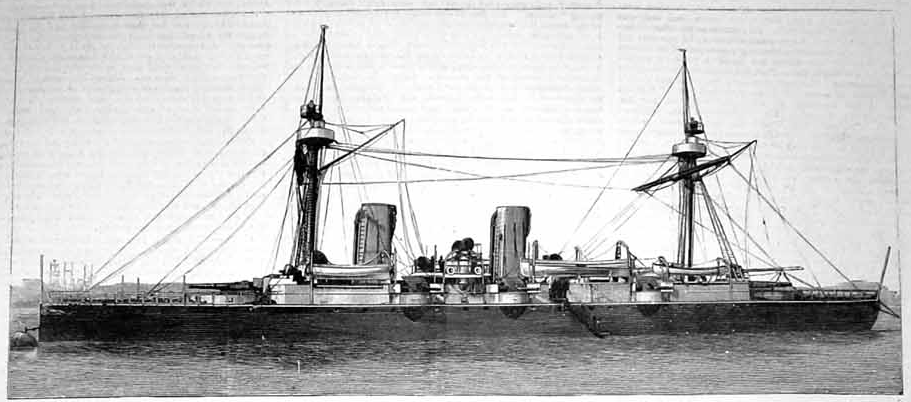
The Graphic published this image of Esmeralda in 1884 and called it the "swiftest and best-armed cruiser afloat"

The British shipbuilding company Armstrong Mitchell and its founder William Armstrong were keen to publicize their design and construction work on Esmeralda, as they believed it would bring in additional warship orders. Armstrong boasted to press outlets in 1884 that Esmeralda was "the swiftest and most powerfully armed cruiser in the world" and that it was "almost absolutely secure from the worst effects of projectiles."

Armstrong believed that the protected cruiser warship type, exemplified by Esmeralda, would usher in the end of the ironclad era. According to him, several cruisers could be built and sent out as commerce raiders, much like the Confederate States Navy warship Alabama during the American Civil War, all for the price of one ironclad. This argument closely mirrored the emerging Jeune École school of naval thought, and protected cruisers like Esmeralda were hailed by Jeune École proponents as "the battleship of the future."

Armstrong also pointedly noted that it was a friendly country like Chile purchasing the ship rather than one that might become hostile with the United Kingdom. With this comment, Armstrong hoped to induce the Royal Navy to order protected cruisers from his company to prevent him from selling them to British enemies. His remarks were later summarized in the Record of Valparaíso:

Happily ... she had passed into the hands of a nation which is never likely to be at war with England, for he could conceive no more terrible scourge for our commerce than she would be in the hands of an enemy. No cruiser in the British navy was swift enough to catch her or strong enough to take her. We have seen what the Alabama could do ... what might we expect from such an incomparably superior vessel as the Esmeralda[?]

The promotion did not end with Armstrong himself. His company added a weighty article in the Times of London that was anonymously written by Armstrong Mitchell's chief naval architect, and the Prince of Wales, the future King Edward VII, visited the ship.

These marketing efforts proved quite successful: an 1885 article in The Steamship journal said that "no vessel of recent construction has attracted greater attention than the protected cruiser Esmeralda". The positive attention Esmeralda wrought significantly benefited Armstrong Mitchell. By the time Esmeralda was completed in 1884, Armstrong was or would soon be constructing protected cruisers for over a dozen countries. Nathaniel Barnaby, the Director of Naval Construction for the British Admiralty (the department in charge of Britain's Royal Navy) would later write that Esmeralda and the ship type it pioneered "made the fortune" of Armstrong's company and was a major factor in the widespread abandonment of sails in the world's navies.

Across the Atlantic, the Army and Navy Journal published an interview with an American naval officer who expressed his belief that Esmeralda could stand off San Francisco and drop shells into the city while being in no danger from the shorter-ranged shore-based batteries covering the Golden Gate strait. "Chile has today the finest, fastest, and most perfectly equipped fighting war ship of her size afloat," he said. "She could destroy our entire Navy, ship by ship, and never be touched." This hyperbolic perspective was part of a larger effort to draw attention to the underfunded and under-equipped state of the United States Navy.

In Chile itself, Esmeralda's capabilities were highly anticipated: it was financed in part by public donations and the country's newspapers published lengthy treatises on the cruiser's potential power. Chile's president, Domingo Santa María, said that Esmeralda would keep the Chilean Navy on a "respectable footing."

=== Analysis and criticism ===
Like the Tsukushi design that preceded it, Esmeralda mounted a heavy armament and was constructed out of lightweight steel, a feature enabled by the Siemens process. Unlike the earlier ship, Esmeralda was far larger and had much more seaworthy design, including a freeboard that put the ship's deck 5 feet (1.5 m) farther above the water; it was faster (it was for a time the fastest cruiser in the world); had a better secondary armament; was able to steam longer distances before needing more coal; and had deck armor that extended the length of the ship to protect the propulsion machinery and magazines. Esmeralda's design also favorably compared to the British Comus-class corvette and the American cruisers Atlanta and Boston.

Still, Esmeralda's design was the target of strong criticism from the British Admiralty, especially in comparison to contemporary designs like their Mersey class. The Chilean ship's freeboard was higher than Armstrong's previous design, but it was still a mere 10 feet 9 inches (3.28 m) from the waterline. It also lacked a double bottom, a heavily armored conning tower, (Note: Esmeralda's conning tower weighed 6 long tons (6.7 short tons), 44 long tons (49 short tons) less than Mersey's.) and any provision for emergency steering should the primary steering position be destroyed in battle. Moreover, the design of Esmeralda's coal bunkers meant that if it was hit in certain key areas, water would be able to flow into a large part of the ship. Finally, an Admiralty comparison of Esmeralda with the Mersey design found that the former carried nearly 400 tons less armor. That meant that armor made up 3.54 percent of the ship's total displacement; the same figure for Mersey was 12.48 percent.

Modern assessments have also veered toward the negative. Nearly a century after Esmeralda was completed, naval historian Nicholas A. M. Rodger wrote that Esmeralda's design suffered from a disconnect between what Rendel designed the ship to do, and the missions most small cruisers in the world, including Chile's, would take on in a conflict. With large ten-inch (254 mm) guns and a high speed, which meant its captain could choose any appropriate fighting range, Rendel intended to make Esmeralda a threat to even the most heavily armed and armored capital warships. However, the typical role of a wartime cruiser in this period was to protect its flag's maritime trade or disrupt an enemy's. For this mission, the ten-inch guns were unnecessarily large and took up displacement that could have been devoted to other concerns. Warship contributor Kathrin Milanovich added that the practical utility of Esmeralda's ten-inch guns were limited by the light build of the ship, which did not provide a stable platform when firing, and its low freeboard, which allowed the guns to be swamped in rough seas. Milanovich also pointed out the lack of a double bottom and the limited size of Esmeralda's coal bunkers.

Except for designs that immediately followed Esmeralda (the Japanese Naniwa class and the Italian Giovanni Bausan), no other Armstrong-built protected cruiser would ever mount a gun larger than 8.2 inches (210 mm).

=== Specifications ===
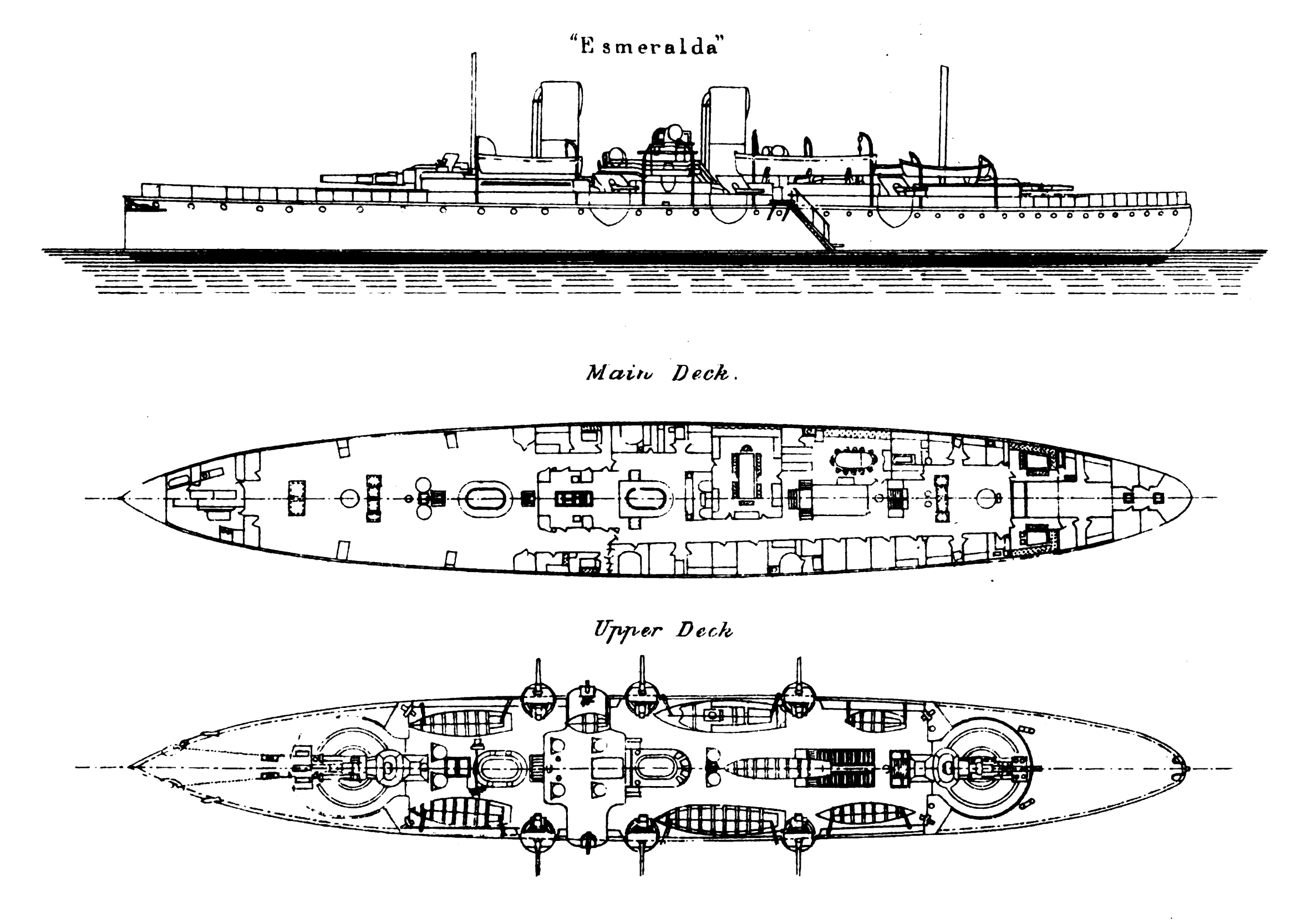
Plans of Esmeralda as drawn for the Naval Annual of 1887

Esmeralda was made entirely of steel and measured in at a length of 270 feet (82 m) between perpendiculars. It had a beam of 42 feet (13 m), a mean draft of 18 feet 6 inches (5.6 m), and displaced 2,950 long tons (3,000 t). It was designed for a crew of 296.

For armament, Esmeralda's main battery was originally equipped with two ten-inch (254 mm)/30 caliber guns in two single barbettes, one each fore and aft. These weapons were able to be trained to either side of the ship, raised to an angle of 12°, and depressed to 5°. They weighed 25 tons each; the shells they fired weighed 450 pounds (200 kg) and required a powder charge of 230 pounds (100 kg). Its secondary armament consisted of six 6-inch (152 mm)/26 caliber guns in single Vavasseur central pivot mountings; two 6-pounder guns located on the bridge wings; and five 37 mm (1.5 in) Hotchkiss revolving cannons located in elevated positions. The ship was also fitted for but not with three 14-inch (360 mm) torpedo tubes.

The propulsion machinery consisted of two horizontal compound steam engines built by R and W Hawthorn, which were fed by four double-ended fire-tube boilers. The engines were placed in separate compartments. On Esmeralda's sea trials, this machinery proved good for 6,803 indicated horsepower (5,070 kW), making a speed of 18.3 knots (34 km/h; 21 mph). The ship generally carried up to 400 long tons (410 t) of coal, but a maximum of 600 long tons (610 t) could be carried if necessary. Unusually, the ship was not equipped with sailing rigging.

To protect itself, Esmeralda had an arched protective deck below the waterline that ran from bow to stern; it was 1 inch (25 mm) thick over the important machinery, and .5 inches (13 mm) near the ends of the ship. It also had cork mounted along the waterline with the intention of limiting flooding and increasing buoyancy in the case of shell penetration, but the cork's practicality was limited. The ship's coal bunkers were also designed to be part of the protective scheme, but as they were not subdivided, their utility if damaged in battle were also severely questionable. The ship's main guns were provided with shields up to 2 inches (51 mm) thick, and the conning tower was provided with 1-inch armor, sufficient only against rifles. (Note: Conway's All the World's Fighting Ships instead states that the protective deck was a maximum of 2 inches thick, and that the conning tower's armor was 2 inches.)

While in Japanese service, Esmeralda was renamed Izumi and fitted with two 6-inch (152 mm)/40 caliber quick-firing guns (in 1901–1902), six 4.7-inch (120 mm)/40 caliber quick-firing guns (in 1899), several smaller guns, and three 18-inch (460 mm) torpedo tubes. These changes lightened the ship, making for a displacement of 2,800 long tons (2,845 t) even though its machinery could still manage 6,500 ihp (4,800 kW).

== Chilean service ==
Armstrong Mitchell laid Esmeralda's keel down on 5 April 1881 in Elswick, Newcastle upon Tyne. They gave it the yard number 429. The completed hull was launched on 6 June 1883, and the ship was completed on 15 July 1884, making for a construction time of just over three years. While the British government upheld its neutrality through the active prevention of warship deliveries to the countries involved in the War of the Pacific, Armstrong completed Esmeralda after the conclusion of the conflict. It arrived in Chile on 16 October 1884.

Esmeralda allowed Chile to lay claim to possessing the most powerful navy in the Americas, given the United States' naval neglect since the end of their civil war. On the material side, the core of the Chilean fleet consisted of Esmeralda, two well-maintained 1870s Almirante Cochrane-class central-battery ironclads (Almirante Cochrane and Blanco Encalada), and two 1860s armored frigates. On the human side, the Chilean Navy had the capacity to staff those ships with well-trained and highly disciplined foreign-trained officers and sailors.

In April 1885, the Chilean government sent Esmeralda on an unusual and statement-making voyage to show the flag in Panama, joining the great powers of France, the United Kingdom, and the United States. The ship was able to complete the run north in 108 hours, or about four and a half days, maintaining a high average speed of 12.6 knots (23.3 km/h; 14.5 mph) for the first hundred of those hours. At least one historian has stated that Esmeralda was ordered to block an annexation of Panama by the United States, which had sent marines and several warships to the area, but another has argued that the various sources of information about the incident are contradictory and do not necessarily agree with that interpretation. Through the 1880s, the ship was reportedly docked every four months to have its bottom repainted to avoid corrosion.

=== Chilean Civil War ===
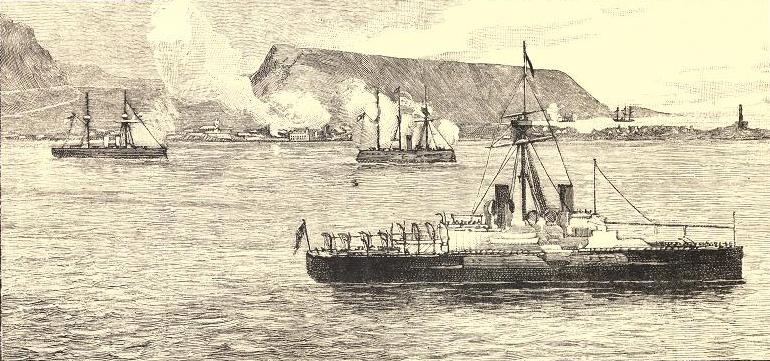
Illustration showing the Battle of Iquique from the sea; Esmeralda is in the background to the left, accompanied by other ships of the Chilean Navy, and HMS Warspite as an observer in front while the port is bombarded

During the 1891 Chilean Civil War, Esmeralda and most of the Chilean Navy supported the victorious Congressionalist rebels over the rival Presidential-led faction. Esmeralda's commander Policarpo Toro refused to join the Congressionalists and was therefore replaced by Pedro Martínez. In the first days of the war, Esmeralda steamed to the port of Talcahuano in search of money and weapons. It then went further south to intercept the corvette Abtao and the two Almirante Lynch class torpedo gunboats coming from Europe to Chile, but did not find them.

Later, Esmeralda left for the north of the country to participate with the rest of the Congressionalist squadron in blockading and controlling the ports in the area. On 19 February, during the final phase of naval operations in the north, it participated in the Battle of Iquique. Congressionalist troops, outnumbered, managed to retain that strategic port with the decisive support of the squadron, which bombarded the positions of the Presidential troops until they capitulated.

On 12 March, Esmeralda engaged in a prolonged chase of the steamer Imperial, an elusive transport ship that had a reputation for being the fastest on the coast and had previously managed to bring reinforcements north for the Presidential cause. The engagement began in the early morning of that day in front of Antofagasta and lasted until night. Although Esmeralda was able to get close enough to fire shots at Imperial, the cruiser was unable to reach its maximum speed due to dirty boilers and lost track of the transport that night.

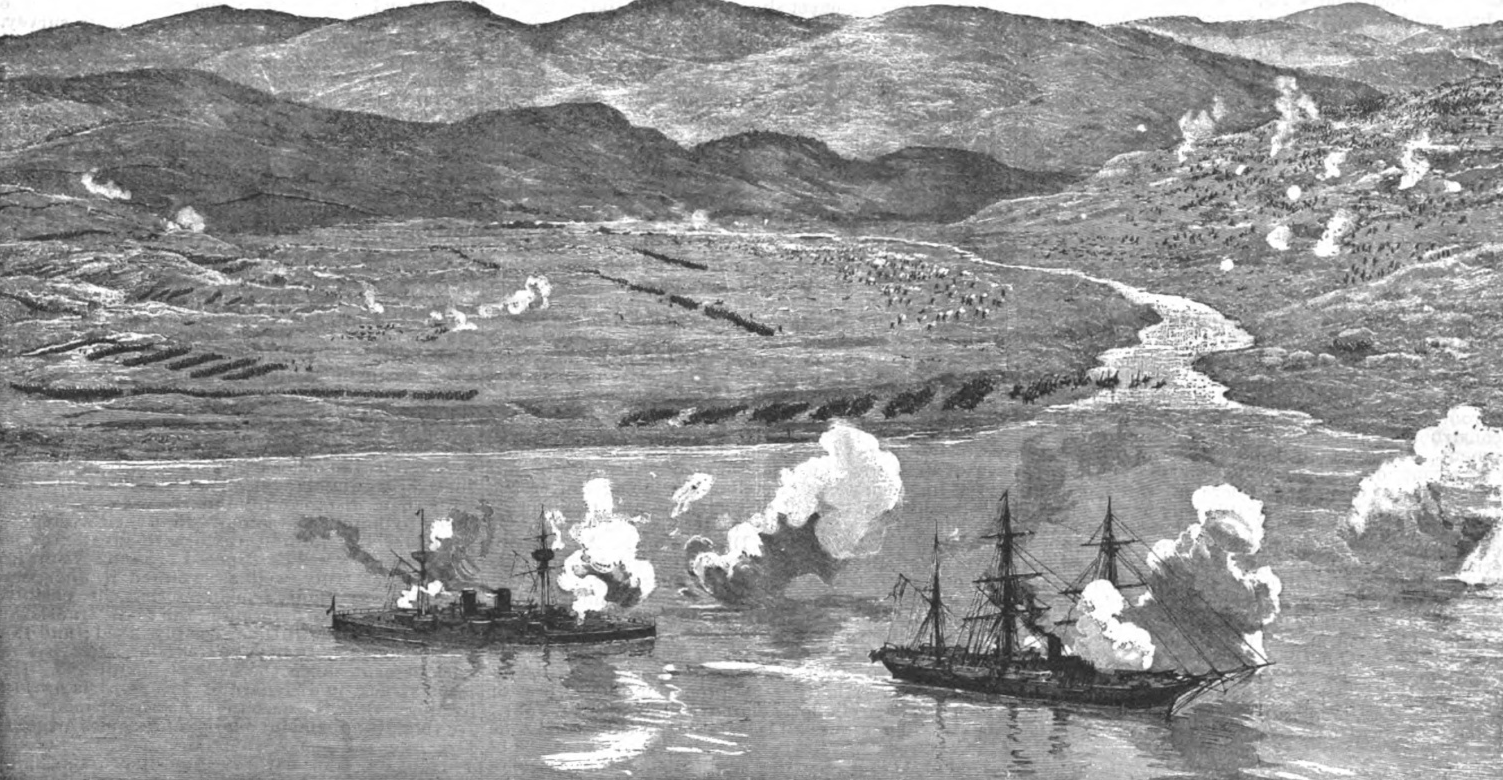
Illustration showing Esmeralda with the corvette Magallanes covering the advance of Congressionalist forces during the Battle of Concón

One month later, the ship escorted the Congressionalist cargo ship Itata north to the United States so that it could take on a load of rifles. In an attempt to disguise the intended cargo's destination, the two vessels parted ways off the coast of Mexico. In what would become known as the Itata incident, the cargo ship was detained to uphold American neutrality in Chile's civil war but escaped. The US cruiser Charleston was sent to hunt the cargo ship down, and press outlets published their opinions on whether Esmeralda or Charleston would prevail if it came to single combat. Although the two warships did meet in Acapulco, Mexico, no violence broke out. Itata reached Chile without further incident, but to put a halt to the escalating situation, the Congressionalists sent the cargo ship back to San Diego with its cargo intact.

In August, Esmeralda participated in the last naval operations of the war by supporting the landing of Congressionalist troops at Quintero Bay. On the 17th, it steamed near Valparaíso and fired three shots to alert the Congressionalists of its arrival. On the 21st, Esmeralda with the corvettes O'Higgins and Magallanes engaged the Presidential ground forces during the Battle of Concón from the mouth of the Aconcagua River. Their gunfire did not kill many soldiers, but it severely demoralized the Presidential forces; Scientific American stated that their shells "raised fearful havoc". Finally on the 22nd, Esmeralda attacked the forts of Viña del Mar together with the ironclad Almirante Cochrane.

== The "Esmeralda Affair": sale to Japan via Ecuador ==
After the Chilean Civil War, the Chilean Navy briefly considered modernizing Esmeralda in March 1894 amid the quickly escalating Argentine–Chilean naval arms race. These efforts went as far as asking Armstrong to furnish plans for upgrading the ship's weapons, replacing its propulsion machinery, adding superstructure, and more. However, in November 1894 they instead sold the ship to the Imperial Japanese Navy, likely in an effort to raise the funds for a new armored cruiser. (Note: This ship would also take the name Esmeralda.) Japan agreed to purchase Esmeralda for ¥3.3 million, using about a third of the funds that the Japanese Cabinet and Parliament had originally earmarked for the purchase of three Argentine warships.

The sale was complicated by the Chilean government's desire to remain neutral in the ongoing First Sino-Japanese War. To get around this, the Chileans induced the Ecuadorian government to secretly act as an middleman by allegedly sending a considerable sum of money to Luis Cordero Crespo, the country's president. Under this plan, brokered by Charles Ranlett Flint's Flint & Co., Esmeralda would be sold to Ecuador. Their navy would take formal possession of the ship, then hand it to Japanese sailors in Ecuadorian territory. This would formally make Ecuador, not Chile, the seller. Although there was some speculation in American press outlets that Esmeralda would remain with the Ecuadorian Navy for potential use against Peru, the deal went ahead as planned and the cruiser was handed over to the Japanese near the Galapagos Islands. This arrangement would later become known as the "Esmeralda Affair", and when the secret arrangements were made public, they were seized upon by Cordero's political opponents to launch the successful Liberal Revolution.

== Japanese service ==
Although the Japanese purchased Esmeralda with the intention of using it in the First Sino-Japanese War, the cruiser arrived in Japan in February 1895—too late to take an active role in the conflict. The Japanese Navy renamed the cruiser Izumi and employed it in the post-war invasion of Taiwan later that year. In 1899, the Japanese replaced the ship's secondary armament with quick-firing 4.7-inch guns and removed the ship's fighting tops to improve its stability. Two years later, Izumi's ten-inch guns were removed in favor of quick-firing 6-inch weapons. Between the modifications, it remained on active duty with the standing naval squadron and took part in what the US Office of Naval Intelligence called "by far the most comprehensive" naval training exercise ever conducted by Japan up to that point. The exercise involved a large portion of the Japanese Navy; at different parts of it, Izumi was assigned to a green water blocking squadron and a blue water attacking fleet.

Japan and its navy went to war again in 1904, this time against Russia. In December of that year, Izumi was deployed on a patrol line south of Dalian Bay after the Japanese cruiser Akashi struck a mine. Later that month, Izumi was sent back to Japan for minor repairs so it would be fit for combat against the approaching Russian Baltic Fleet. When the Japanese deployed their ships for what would later be known as the Battle of Tsushima, a decisive Japanese victory, Izumi was one of four cruisers to make up the Sixth Division within the Third Squadron. These groups were under the commands of Rear Admiral Tōgō Masamichi and Vice Admiral Kataoka Shichirō, respectively.

The Tsushima Strait is located between present-day South Korea (top left) and Japan (bottom right)

Izumi's pre-battle assigned role was to support a line of auxiliary cruisers stationed in the Tsushima Strait. These ships were charged with spotting the Russian fleet so its Japanese counterpart could move into position to engage. This line was later described by historian Julian Corbett as "ill-covered," and Izumi compounded the issue by being 8–9 miles (13–14 km) out of position on the morning of the battle (27 May 1905). Moreover, it had trouble finding the Russians after investigating erroneously located spotting reports radioed in by the auxiliary Shinano Maru at 4:45 am.

Around 6:30 or 6:40 am, Izumi finally made visual contact with the opposing Russian fleet; it was the first proper warship to do so. Correcting the previously mistaken spotting, Izumi shadowed the Russians for several hours, correctly identifying the lead Russian flagship as a cruiser of the Izumrud class, and reported their movements back to the main Japanese fleet. Izumi also warned off an army hospital ship and a troop transport in the area before they were caught by the Russians.

As the two fleets drew near for battle, Izumi was forced to turn away from heavy fire at around 1:50 pm; the change in course allowed it to cut off two of the Russian fleet's hospital ships, which were later captured by two of the Japanese auxiliary cruisers. Later in the battle, when the Japanese main battle line had 'crossed the T' of the Russian fleet and forced it to turn around, Izumi and several other lighter ships from Japanese squadrons were caught in close proximity to heavy Russian ships. Izumi escaped with minimal damage, in part due to the intervention of the Japanese battleships of the Second Squadron.

After the Japanese victory, Izumi and the rest of the Sixth Division were deployed to support the invasion of Sakhalin by escorting the army's transport ships.

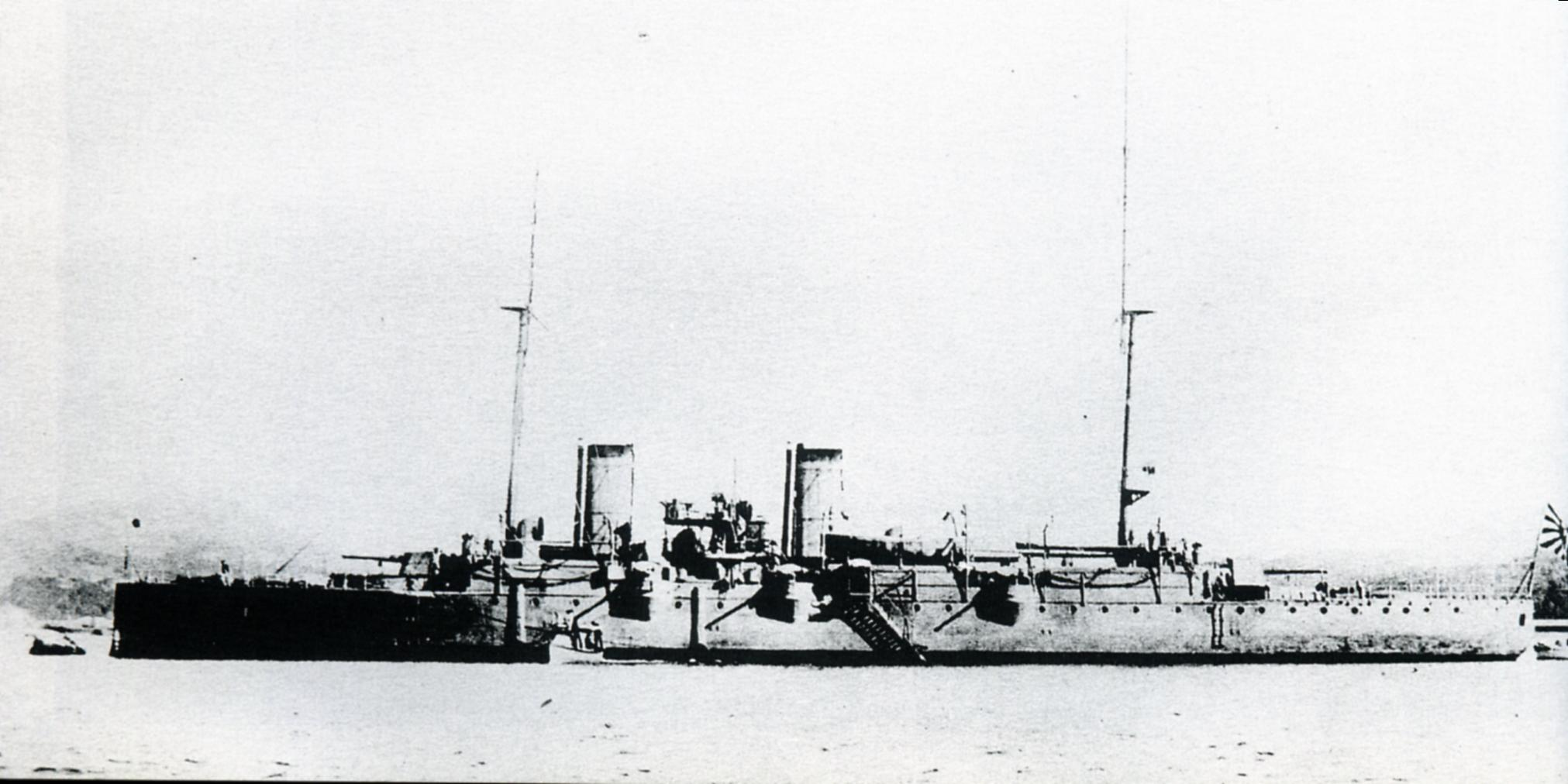
Izumi in 1908

Soon after the conclusion of the war in September 1905, the Japan Weekly Mail described the aging Izumi as being "obsolete" and "fit only for non-combat duties". Indeed, the Japanese only deployed the ship for auxiliary tasks for the next several years. For example, the same newspaper reported in February 1906 that the ship would transport former Prime Minister of Japan and the first Japanese Resident-General of Korea Itō Hirobumi to his post. On 1 April 1912, Izumi was struck from Japan's navy list. It was later sold for scrapping in Yokosuka for ¥90,975.
