= 1900 in Chile =

- Decades: 1880s; 1890s; 1900s; 1910s; 1920s
- See also: Other events of 1900; Timeline of Chilean history

The following lists events that happened during 1900 in Chile.

== Incumbents ==
- President of Chile: Federico Errázuriz Echaurren

== Events ==
=== October ===
- 10 October – The Santiago National football club is founded.

=== Undated ===
- Exceptionally heavy and frequent rains during the winter across the centre of the country produce the wettest year for which reliable records are available at Santiago and Valparaíso, both of which receive more than twice their normal rainfall, with Quinta Normal recording 819.7 millimetres or 32.27 inches and Valparaíso over 1,040 millimetres (40.94 in)^{[a]} – with some sources suggesting Valparaíso accumulated as much as 1,345 millimetres (52.95 in).

== Births ==
- 5 April – Jorge González von Marées (died 1962)
- 21 May – Hernan Alessandri (died 1982)
- 13 July – Teresa of Los Andes (died 1920)
- 18 July – Juan Gómez Millas (died 1987)

== Deaths ==
=== April ===
- April 9 - Eduardo de la Barra, geographical engineer, poet, and philologist (b. 1839)

=== September ===
- September 18 - José Ravest y Bonilla, lawyer, writer, and judge (b. 1823)

== Notes ==
^{a} It’s likely that early meteorological annuals may have underestimated totals in Valparaíso as smaller falls may not have been recorded accurately.
