= Emil Körner =

Prussian-born Chilean general (1846–1920)

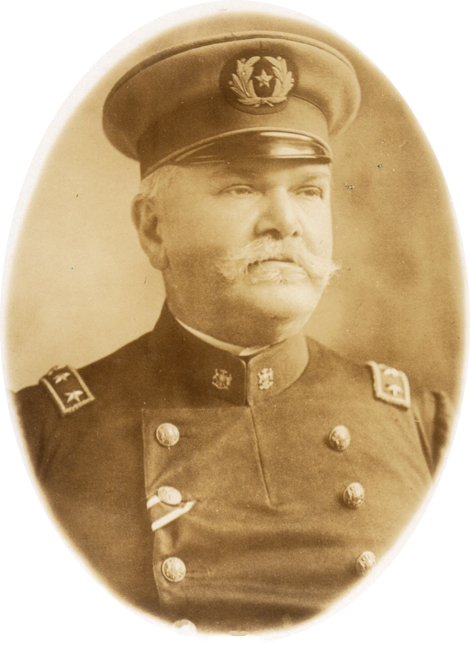
- Emil Körner in the uniform of the Chilean Army
- Born: Emil Körner; 1846; Prussia
- Died: March 25, 1920 (Age 74); Berlin
- Years active: 1866 - 1910
- Employer: Government of Chile
- Organization: Chilean Army
- Title: Inspector General of the Chilean Army

Emil Körner Henze (10 October 1846 in Wegwitz – 25 March 1920 in Berlin), sometimes called Emilio Körner Henze in Spanish, was a German officer (Hauptmann) of the Prussian Army and commander-in-chief of the Chilean Army with the rank of inspector general from 1900 to 1910.

He supervised military modernization efforts in Chile by training troops along Prussian lines, creating a war academy in 1887, and encouraging Chile to become the first state in Latin America to institute military conscription.

== Early life ==
Emil Theodor Körner was born on October 10, 1846, in Wegnitz in the Merseburg district, a province of Saxony in the Kingdom of Prussia, son of Ludwig Körner and Alwina Henze, being baptized in the Lutheran faith as were his parents. From his earliest childhood he was educated under rigid Prussian precepts, which would bear him an innumerable amount of fruits in his life.

His first scholarly steps were in entering the city college of Halle, in the same province of Saxony, from which he graduated with his bachelor's degree in the humanities in 1866.

== Career in Germany ==
He joined the Prussian Army as an officer candidate while the campaigns of the Austro-Prussian War of 1866 were materializing and admitted as an officer candidate in the 4th Artillery Regiment of Magdeburg without turning in the entrance exams because of his excellent grades. In that post the same year, he participated in the Austrian campaign but did not manage to take part in the operations because although his unit moved quickly to the theater of operations after the rapid conclusion of that war and the Prussian triumph in at Sadowa. Its support was no longer required and received a counter marching order, the unit returned to its garrison.

In 1867, he was promoted to standard bearer and afterwards joined as a cadet in the Military School of Hannover in the Kingdom of Hannover, which that year had been annexed to Prussia. There, he continued his military studies, stood out in military sciences, and showed great physical resistance and a work capacity that were superior to his classmates.

In 1868, he was promoted to ensign and continued his studies in the Artillery and Engineering School of Charlottenburg in Berlin where he stood out because of his educational results. From there, he graduated with the rank of second lieutenant in 1870, the year he participated in the Franco-Prussian War.

In the campaigns of the Franco-Prussian War, despite his few years of service, he stood out as battery commander on behalf of his performance in the Battles of Wörth, Sedan, and in the Siege of Paris, where he was hurt many times. Those actions awarded him the Iron Cross second class and the commemorative medal of the campaign.

When the campaign ended he re-enrolled in the Artillery School of Charlottenburg to complete his studies. From 1872, he served with the rank of first lieutenant in the 14th Artillery Regiment, from which he was sent to the Imperial War Academy of Berlin in 1873. There, he fulfilled his studies for officer of the Chiefs of Staff from 1873 to 1876, occupying the third position, the first place in his class being Paul von Hindenburg, the victor of the Tannenberg and the Battle of the Masurian Lakes and the second place being held by Jakob Meckel, the successful reorganizer of the Imperial Japanese Army in the late 19th century.

Besides pursuing his internship in the academy, by order of the High Command, he performed secondments in the 71st Infantry Regiment in 1874 and the 6th Dragoon Regiment in 1875.

Finishing his studies in the academy in 1877, he was chosen and commissioned by the Chief of Staff, the field marshal Helmuth von Moltke, to make educational trips in France, Italy, Spain, Africa, and Russia until 1878.

In 1881, he was promoted to the rank of captain and designated as professor of the Artillery and Engineering School. He conducted classes of military history, hoplology, tactics, and ballistics between 1882 and 1885 and stood out again for his work.

== Modernization plans for Chilean Army ==
With the War of the Pacific recently concluded, Chilean President Domingo Santa María, based on his lived war experiences in the conflict, judged that the Army needed to modernize and reorganize itself on the model of a European army. The government fixed its sights on Germany, whose military prestige presented itself as the zenith of war experience after the campaigns against Austria and France. Körner was the second choice, with the Chile government initially targeting Jakob Meckel who ended up accepting a position with the Japanese military. Körner's salary was 12,000 marks a year, paid in Chilean gold.

Also, the Chilean government had known the general progress in the south of the country thanks to the German colonization, which was a clear demonstration of German ability. The analysis of the military operations of the War of the Pacific showed the lack of discipline of the Chilean Army and the need for modernization. Despite the victory, the war established that Chilean operations were not in accordance with the advances that war elements had reached in that time. The historian Gonzalo Bulnes held that the country had not counted on a real army, its own being antiquated, at the level of the wars of the early 19th century.

The embassy in Berlin in the charge of Guillermo Matta, fulfilling government instruction, contacted the German military and, under the authorization of the Marshal von Moltke, through the War Ministry, General Bronsart von Schellendorf, in 1885 and after three years of negotiations contracted the services of a Prussian artillery captain, who then found himself stationed in the Artillery and Engineering School of Charlottenburg. Emil Körner, who stood out for his brilliant background and great war experience, came under the concept that he had to realize in Chile the necessary reforms to transform its army into a mirror of the Prussian, a five-year work contract, with a possible renewal.

It is important to highlight that the request to incorporate a German officer had been made to the supreme government by the General Emilio Sotomayor and Admiral Patricio Lynch specifically to reform the military system.

== Change of faction ==
The Civil War of 1891 was a conflict of powers between the president of the republic and the parliament around (initially) the interpretation of the constitution, and it marked the first political intervention of the four officers educated by General Körner in the Prussian way.

The defense institutions of the Chilean Republic adhered to different factions, but dissidents followed their particular ideologies without permitting the institutional ideology to interfere with their personal and particular ideologies, one of them being the now Lieutenant Colonel of the Chilean Army, Emil Körner, principally because of the disagreements that he had with the veteran officers of the War of the Pacific, who resisted his modifications since they believed that the modernization could soon remove them from their leadership positions.

The army's high-ranking officers insisted that it was incompatible with their discipline, the subordinates would know more than their superiors, and there were no posts to give to the students who were going to leave the War Academy, whose suppression they wanted. President José Manuel Balmaceda found himself between two fires since he could not become an enemy of the army officers who helped him in his nationalist politics and, although he appreciated the points of view of the young officers, he disregarded their complaints, which pushed them to intervene against him. The army took sides in the parliament. Their instructor Emilio Körner started to organize them and encouraged other desertions. Körner decided to integrate himself into the Congressional Army under severe threats from the government of a process in military justice. It voided Körner's contract and communicated that to the German ambassador in Santiago, Baron Felix von Gutschmid.

He left on March 5, 1891, from Valparaíso with a group of officials, students of the Army War Academy, to Iquique, where he was gratefully received and integrated to the congressional forces with his same rank of colonel lieutenant. The forces were directed by Colonel Estanislao del Canto, who put him in charge of the mission of organizing the incipient revolutionary army in the capacity of Chief of Staff. There, he would unfold his entire initiative and knowledge by instructing the inexperienced troops that the revolutionaries transferred from every corner of Chile and settled in Iquique. He had to equip and instruct them and to lecture the military leaders on the new type of European war. Del Canto expressed that Körner's active labor and perseverance gave a great impulse to the formation and the organization of the congressional troops.

The war was carried out with the well-instructed troops and developed itself in good form for the congress. That opened the doors for the central area, to where their forces were transferred, which gave the coup de grace to the government ofBalmaceda. Körner became a colonel on July 1 and planned and materialized a disembarking the north of Concón to approach the enemy positions by means of columns.

On August 26, 1891, at the Battle of Concón, Körner served as Chief of Staff and was given the command of the first brigade and the corresponding responsibility to effect the attack in the west wing of the offensive. His unit crossed the Aconcagua River in the morning at 11:25 to provide security for the crossings of the second and third brigades, which occurred 7 to 8 km toward the east by other fords. The opposition from the Balmacedist troops was as had been expected, as they did not use the natural obstacles that the terrain offered (the Aconcagua River and Petra Gorge).

Körner rapidly dispersed the constitutional forces, which earned him great appraisals for his bravery. His participation in the skirmish extended in the afternoon until the end of the battle, at approximately 3:30, where he immediately began to organize the congressional forces to confront what was coming. Since he realized that the Battle of Concón would not be decisive, he reorganized the congressional forces and prepared himself to fight the next battle. Many Balmacedist forces had fled, and their commanders guided them to the rear to reorganize themselves to prepare for a new confrontation.

Two days later, the Battle of Placilla was fought, which was a continuation of the Battle of Concó. Conforming to his planning, the principal attack had to materialize over the right of the government troops from the two constitutional brigades. On that occasion, Körner, in his position as Chief of Staff, had to remain with the commander of the forces, Estanislao del Canto.

The attack began at 7:30 in the morning without delays. Colonel del Canto directed the troops from the heights and arranged from the first division (that was in the front) on the part of the 3rd Division. In that moment, he was advised that the Colonel Körner had taken charge of the 3rd Division and had committed himself to the combat, altering its mechanism, which at a glance appeared to have put the attack in danger, but this situation was offset by an effective cavalry charge that made the president's forces flee. His impetuous character betrayed him, which this time and got him acidic criticisms on behalf of his Commander in Chief, but these same criticisms were undone upon seeing the conclusion of the battle.

Placilla was a decisive success and undid any intent of subsequent defense. The optimal results obtained were principally due to the quality of the commanders being a surprise for the military forces loyal to the government of Balmaceda, since they trusted his experience obtained in the War of the Pacific with the use of the modern war materials but with tactics, techniques, and obsolete proceedings that dated to the era of Napoleon Bonaparte, with an evident antiquated professional training, facing a modernized army in armament and war tactics with trained commanders and competent officers.

After these bloody battles, they occupied Santiago and made the Navy Captain Jorge Montt the choice as president to replace General Manuel Baquedano, who had been named provisional president for Balmaceda, who committed suicide in the Argentine legation at Santiago. In turn, Estanslao del Canto was relegated to a secondary position for representing a political danger and they gave all the honors for the victory to Körner. Slowly, peace returned to Chile.

== Afterward ==
The civil war ended, the triumphant parliament honored Körner with the rank of Brigadier General and named him Chief of the General Staff, restarting immediately his institutional reforms. Despite this, the congress did not totally support his modernization plans and limited them for fear of a power that would counterbalance them and also for the fact that the new government consolidated slowly, owing to the disorder of a political, economic, social, and military nature, proper to the end of a civil war. Körner as a landmark of this period was able to reorganize the National Guard in September 1892 and despite his high rank in the army, his love of teaching drove him to continue with the instruction of officers and he returned to the War Academy as a professor, carrying out a series of writings of a military theme between which Study of Military History (Estudio sobre Historia Militar) stands out, made in collaboration with Jorge Boonen.

Whereas before General Körner had been reprimanded by Germany for his participation in the civil war of a country whose government had contracted him, in 1892 Kaiser Wilhelm II awarded him the Cross of the Red Eagle, second class for bringing his troops to victory in the revolution. Afterwards the Kaiser would give him a commemorative medal in 1898.

In 1894 he returned to Germany in commission of service for the Chilean Army to supervise the construction and reception of the Krupp coastal batteries and field artillery for the army, returning to Chile the following year, together with 32 German officer instructors at the request of the supreme government who were distributed in the instructional military establishments and in the bodies of troops, adapting the demands of modern warfare to the army conforming to the experiences obtained in the European wars. All of this was with the consent of Kaiser Wilhelm II. Upon his return in 1895 he would be named Major General.

== Border crisis with the Republic of Argentina ==
During the 1890s, the Chilean government began to make provisions for disagreements and a probable border conflict with Argentina because of the territorial problem and subsequent judgment for the territories comprising the Puna de Atacama and Lacár Lake. These provisions for the defense of national interests were decided in secret cabinet meetings between the president of the republic and his ministers beginning in January 1898 and lasting many months. The Chief of Staff, Army General, General Commander of Army Weapons (since 1897), and Major General Emilio Körner was invited to these meetings. He had a vital role in this meeting and indicated that the Chilean Army still wasn't ready for this conflict, as much in preparation as in armaments and he advised the buying of military equipment and war material for an army of 150,000 men.

That proposition was accepted by the government and a period of fiscal discipline and foreign loans was begun, which made possible this acquisition that would be critical in this feared confrontation.

Thus, owing to the aggravating of border problems that existed because of the still deficient demarcation, the government lifted the restrictions that it had imposed on General Körner for the long-awaited reorganization of the Army, for which the general restarted his structural changes, and established obligatory military service in the European fashion which in its time was a great advance for the institution and a measure of growth for the youth.

As another measure to accelerate the Prussianization process carried out by Körner, commissions of military officers were sent to receive military instruction in Germany. From 1895, the schools and the War Academy of the Army proceeded to have almost exclusively German professors, who completed their task efficiently, this being an outstanding success at the international level.

Fortunately, the Chilean war with Argentina did not happen thanks to the calls of peace for both nations.

== Commissions of service and command of the Army ==
In February 1900 General Körner returned commissioned to Germany to acquire the armaments that his Chilean Army required. Upon his arrival in Europe a crowd of more than 10,000 people awaited to welcome him. In 1901 he participated in the scientific congress of Montevideo, winning a reputation as a scholar beyond the military knowledge Körner possessed.

In 1904 Körner was distinguished as Inspector General of the Army, the equivalent to the current Commander in Chief. Although in this position, he would no longer perform functions related to the process of Germanization of the Army. This cause had already been taken on by his former disciples and was a phase of radicalization.

In April of the year 1909, General Körner already being 64 years old, processed his separation from the institution. On April 19, 1910, he was granted absolute retirement having served Chile for 25 years. At the time of his retirement, he left Chile with the a well equipped and prepared force in Latin America.

== Death ==
After his retirement, that same year of 1910 he returned to Germany with his wife Mathilde Junge and his four children, two boys and two girls, taking up residence in the capital of the German Empire, Berlin. Of these descendants in the German archive only the names of his son Theodor and his daughter Elena, who would both return to Chile some years later, appear.

In March 1920, a cable was received from the capital in Berlin announcing the sad news that on the 23rd of that month, Major General Emilio Körner Henze had died of a stroke, and was later buried in Berlin. The banners of all the units of the Chilean Army bowed in respectful mourning. Virginio Figueroa points out in his work, 'When his death occurred, everyone recognized his merits, his great heart and kind feelings,' echoing the national sentiment.

By posthumous will of the general, his wife, seconded by the government of Chile, managed and succeed in repatriating the mortal remains of the General to his adoptive homeland. He was transferred by the steamship Altmark in 1924, to Valparaíso, four years after his death, arriving in Chile on July 25, 1924. He was buried in the army mausoleum momentarily, receiving a series of speeches and sincere demonstrations of appreciation.

Finally in 1928 the government of Chile provided him a magnificent mausoleum in the general cemetery, built by the prestigious architect Gustavo Monckeberg, buried with the highest military honors in his final tomb.
