= 1897 in Chile =

- Decades: 1870s; 1880s; 1890s; 1900s; 1910s
- See also: Other events of 1897; Timeline of Chilean history

The following lists events that happened during 1897 in Chile.

== Incumbents ==
- President of Chile: Federico Errázuriz Echaurren

== Events ==
=== February ===
- 25 February - Commune of Providencia is established.

=== October ===
- 27 October - Deportes Magallanes football club is founded.

== Births ==
- 2 February - Ulises Poirier (died 1977)
- 21 May - Fernando Alessandri (died 1982)

== Deaths ==
- 10 September - Gregorio Urrutia (born 1830)
