= 1893 in Chile =

- Decades: 1870s; 1880s; 1890s; 1900s; 1910s
- See also: Other events of 1893; Timeline of Chilean history

The following lists events that happened during 1893 in Chile.

== Incumbents ==
- President of Chile: Jorge Montt

== Events ==
=== October ===
- 28 October - The Banco de Chile is founded.

=== November ===
- 27 November - The Santiago Stock Exchange is founded.

== Births ==
- 1 January - Arturo Friedemann
- 11 January - Florencio Durán (died 1978)

== Deaths ==
- 7 December - Ramón Cabieses (born 1814), sailor
- Date unknown - Jacinto Chacón (born 1820)
