= 1898 in Chile =

- Decades: 1870s; 1880s; 1890s; 1900s; 1910s
- See also: Other events of 1898; Timeline of Chilean history

The following lists events that happened during 1898 in Chile.

== Incumbents ==
- President of Chile: Federico Errázuriz Echaurren

== Events ==
=== Full date unknown ===
- Francisco Bilbao Workers Party is founded.
- Quilpué is founded.

== Births ==
- 3 January - Carlos Keller, writer and historian (died 1974)
- 30 June - Alfredo Duhalde, politician (died 1985)
- 26 August - Tomás Goyoaga, Olympic fencer (died 1937)
- 22 November - Gabriel González Videla, 24th president of Chile (died 1980)
- 27 November - John Jackson, cricketer and educator (died 1958)
