= 1894 in Chile =

- Decades: 1870s; 1880s; 1890s; 1900s; 1910s
- See also: Other events of 1894; Timeline of Chilean history

The following lists events that happened during 1894 in Chile.

== Incumbents ==
- President of Chile: Jorge Montt

== Events ==
=== May ===
- 6 May – The commune of Renca is founded.

=== June ===
- 20 June – The commune of Porvenir is founded.

=== October ===
- The Sociedad Protectora de la Infancia (English: Child Protection Society) is founded in Santiago.

== Births ==
- 5 September – Marie-Thérèse Pinto, sculptor (died 1980)
- 9 September – Carlos F. Borcosque, film director and screenwriter (died 1965)
- 17 October – Pablo de Rokha, poet (died 1968)

== Deaths ==
- date unknown – Rafael de la Barra López, lawyer and politician
