= 1899 in Chile =

- Decades: 1870s; 1880s; 1890s; 1900s; 1910s
- See also: Other events of 1899; Timeline of Chilean history

The following lists events that happened during 1899 in Chile.

== Incumbents ==
- President of Chile: Federico Errázuriz Echaurren

== Events ==
- 4 February - Chile-Denmark relations: Chile signs a commerce treaty with Denmark.
- 24 March - The Puna de Atacama dispute is resolved.

== Births ==
- 22 April - Eduardo Cruz-Coke (died 1974)
- 16 August - Salvador Reyes Figueroa (died 1970)
- 1 October - Ricardo Romero (fencer)
- 7 December - Felipe Iturriaga (died 1977)

== Deaths ==
- 18 February - Ambrosio Montt Luco (born 1830)
