= Chilean ship Cazador =

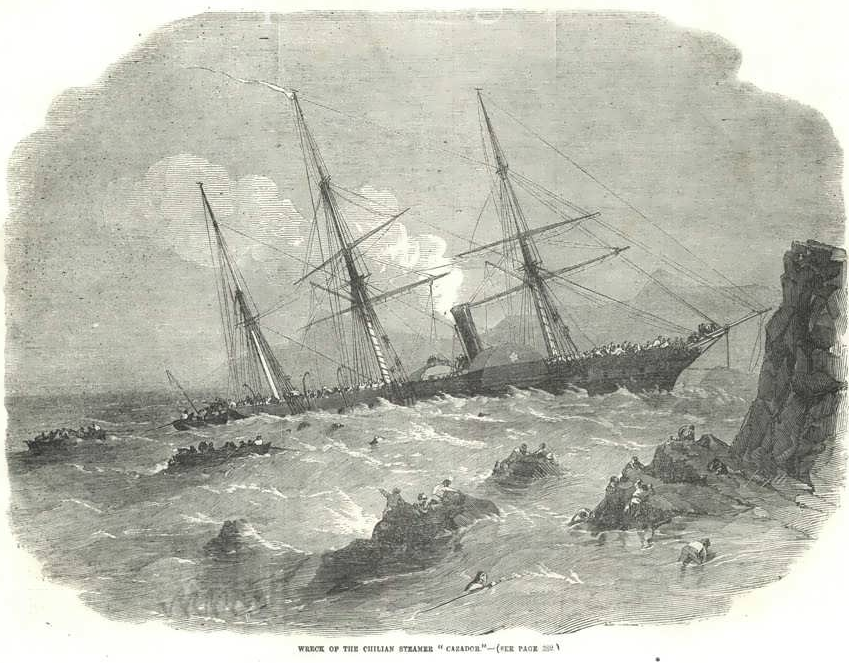
- Sinking of Cazador

History
- Name: General Castilla
- Launched: 1848
- Fate: Sold to Chile 1851

Chile
- Name: Cazador
- Commissioned: 1851
- Honours and awards: First Steamer in the Chilean Navy
- Fate: Sunk on 30 January 1856 off Punta Carranza

General characteristics
- Tons burthen: 250 bm
- Propulsion: 150 ps, 3 masts, barque rigged
- Speed: 9 kn
- Complement: 65

The Cazador was a steamboat built 1848 in France and bought 1851 by the Chilean Navy for the transport of military and cargo along the coast of Chile.

On 30 January 1856, the Cazador sailed off Talcahuano bound for Valparaíso at 11:30 AM carrying the 2nd Company of the Battalion Maipo and their families. In addition, she carried supplies, horses and guns. She sailed 6 miles from the coast at 9 kn.

At 20:00, the ship was driven onto a reef off Point Carranza, 10 km south of Constitución.

The sinking of the Cazador resulted in the greatest single-incident maritime loss of life in the history of Chile.

Sources disagree on the number rescued and the final death toll. The ship's captain, Ramón Cabieses, in his report gives 23 rescued and 307 dead, but author Carlos López Urrutia gives 400 dead.

After the sinking, Captain Cabieses faced a drumhead court martial to determine his responsibility in the deaths of those on board. Public opinion at the time demanded that he be beheaded - however, thanks to his influence, his distinguished service in earlier naval campaigns, and that at the time there were few officials familiar with the coast of Chile, the Chilean Navy commuted his sentence.
