= 1895 in Chile =

- Decades: 1870s; 1880s; 1890s; 1900s; 1910s
- See also: Other events of 1895; Timeline of Chilean history

The following lists events that happened during 1895 in Chile.

== Incumbents ==
- President of Chile: Jorge Montt

== Events ==
=== July ===
- 4 July - The Chilean cruiser Esmeralda (1895) is laid down.

== Births ==
- 27 March - Juan Guzmán Cruchaga (died 1979)
- 10 May - Cristina Montt (died 1969)
