= 1890 in Chile =

- Decades: 1870s; 1880s; 1890s; 1900s; 1910s
- See also: Other events of 1890; Timeline of Chilean history

The following lists events that happened during 1890 in Chile.

== Incumbents ==
- President of Chile: José Manuel Balmaceda

== Births ==
- 1 November - Cárlos Koller

== Deaths ==
- 17 November - Maximiano Errázuriz (born 1832)
