= Ramón Cabieses =

Chilean naval officer

Ramón Cabieses (July 22, 1814 – December 7, 1893) was a Chilean sailor.

His father was the Spanish naval officer Manuel Cabieses Álvarez, and his mother was María Mercedes Alzamora Cantuarias. He graduated from the Escuela Naval Arturo Prat in 1838.

That same year, he joined the navy in the War of the Confederation on board the corvette Libertad, which captured the Socabaya, which was left under his command. After returning to Chile, he was promoted to the rank of captain. Due to his distinguished service in the Battle of Casma, he received a medal from the governor of Chile. He commanded the ketch Magallanes in 1846 and the steamer Cazador from 1851 to 1856, which sank in one of Chile's worst marine disasters.

After the sinking of the Cazador, he faced a drumhead court martial to determine his responsibility in the death of more than 450 people. Public opinion at the time demanded his execution - however, thanks to his influence, his distinguished service in earlier naval campaigns, and that at the time there were few officials familiar with the coast of Chile, the Chilean Navy commuted his sentence, so that he could map and study the hydrography of the dangerous coast that existed south of the Guiatecas Archipelago. His work would create one of the first hydrographic studies in naval history.

Later, Cabieses was nominated to be governor of Valparaíso, Iquique, and Talca. He was major general of the Department of the Navy of Valparaíso, commanded diverse units in the squadron, and commanded the arsenal.

During the Chilean Civil War of 1891, he served as a member of the Committee of the Chilean Navy, in the uprising that overthrew president José Manuel Balmaceda.
