= 1896 in Chile =

- Decades: 1870s; 1880s; 1890s; 1900s; 1910s
- See also: Other events of 1896; Timeline of Chilean history

The following lists events that happened during 1896 in Chile.

== Incumbents ==
- President of Chile: Jorge Montt (until 18 September), Federico Errázuriz Echaurren

== Events ==
=== June ===
- 25 June - Chilean presidential election, 1896

== Births ==
- 8 January - Luciano Kulczewski (d. 1972)
- 19 May - Jorge Alessandri (d. 1986)
- 24 September - Camilo Mori (d. 1973)
