= 1901 in Chile =

- Decades: 1880s; 1890s; 1900s; 1910s; 1920s
- See also: Other events of 1901; Timeline of Chilean history

The following lists events that happened during 1901 in Chile.

== Incumbents ==
- President of Chile: Federico Errázuriz Echaurren (until July 12), Aníbal Zañartu (until September 18), Germán Riesco

== Events ==
=== June ===
- 25 June – Chilean presidential election, 1901

== Births ==
- 1 April -Ernesto Chaparro (died 1957)

== Deaths ==
- 12 July – Federico Errázuriz Echaurren (born 1850)
- 17 September – Juan Esteban Rodríguez Segura (born 1818)
