= Battle of Concón =

Battle of the 1891 Chilean Civil War

- Part of the Chilean Civil War of 1891
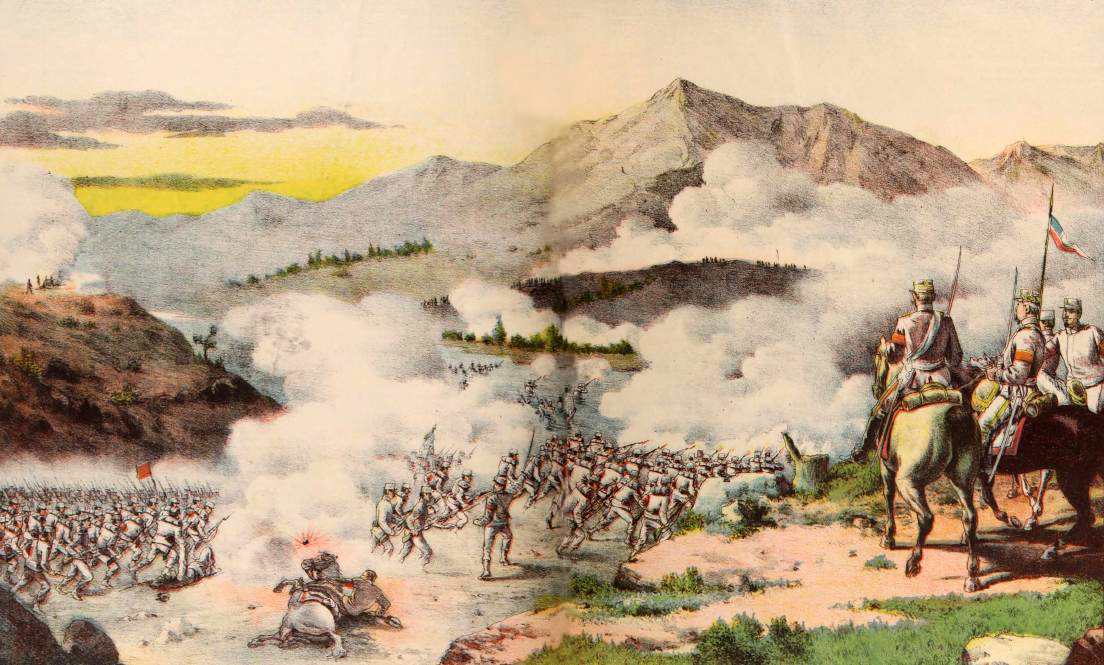
Date	August 21, 1891
Location	Concón, Valparaíso Province, Chile
Result	Congressist victory

Belligerents
(Chile) Congressist Rebels	(Chile) Balmaceda Government

Commanders and leaders
Estanislao del Canto	Orozimbo Barbosa

Strength
9,500 soldiers cruiser Esmeralda corvette O'Higgins	8,000 soldiers

Casualties and losses
400 killed 600 wounded	2,200 killed and wounded 2,000 captured

The Battle of Concón was fought between the forces of the Congress of Chile and loyalists of President Jose Manuel Balmaceda. In mid-August 1891 the rebel forces were embarked at Iquique, numbering in all about 9,000 men, and sailed for the south. The expedition by sea was admirably managed, and on August 10 the congressist army was disembarked at Quintero, about 20 km. north of Valparaiso, miles out of range of its defensive batteries, and marched to Concón, where the Balmacedists were entrenched.

Balmaceda was surprised but acted promptly. The first battle was fought on the Aconcagua river at Concón on August 21. The eager infantry of the Congressional army forced the passage of the river and stormed the heights held by the Gobiernistas. A severe fight ensued, in which the troops of President Balmaceda were defeated with heavy loss. The killed and wounded of the Balmacedists numbered 1,600, and nearly all the prisoners, about 1,500 men, enrolled themselves in the rebel army, which thus more than made good its loss of 1,000 killed and wounded.

== See also ==
- Chilean Civil War of 1891
