= 1892 in Chile =

- Decades: 1870s; 1880s; 1890s; 1900s; 1910s
- See also: Other events of 1892; Timeline of Chilean history

The following lists events that happened during 1892 in Chile.

== Incumbents ==
- President of Chile: Jorge Montt

== Events ==
- 15 August - The Santiago Wanderers Football Club is established

== Births ==
- 20 July - Juan Bascuñán (died 1969)

== Deaths ==
- 13 June - Francisco Astaburuaga Cienfuegos (born 1817)
