= Battle of Pozo Almonte =

Battle during the Chilean Civil War of 1891

- Part of the Chilean Civil War of 1891
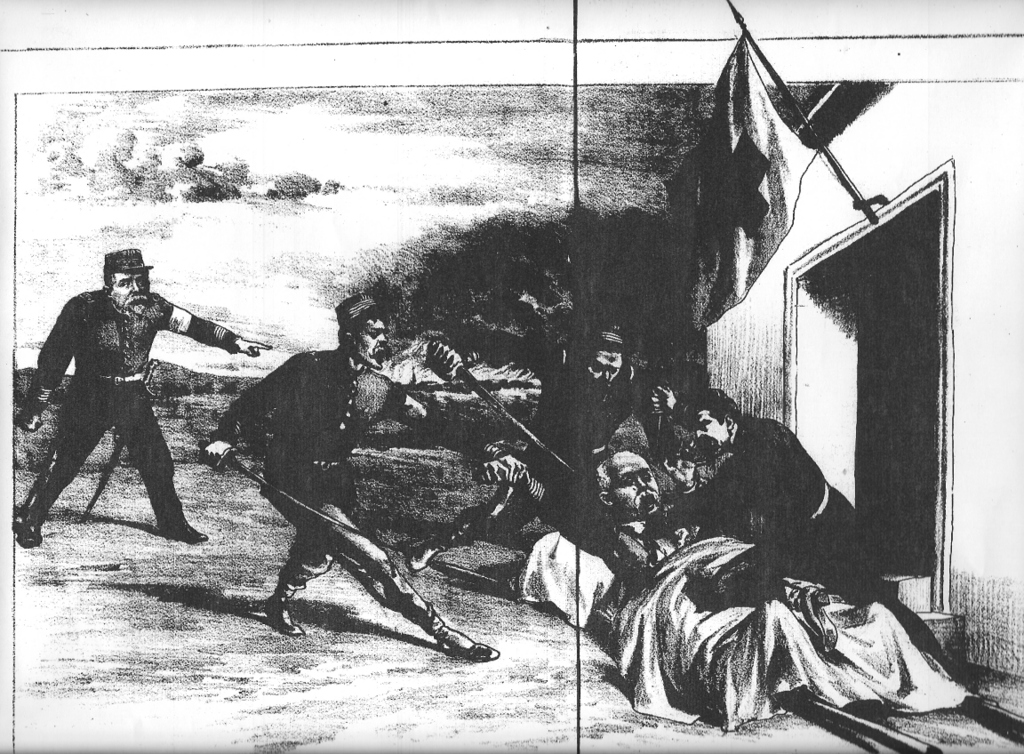
- Assassination of Eulogio Robles by congressional troops after the battle (vintage engraving).
Date	6 March 1891
Location	Pozo Almonte, Tamarugal Province, Chile
Result	Congressionist victory

Belligerents
(Chile) Balmaceda Government	(Chile) Congressionist Junta

Commanders and leaders
(Chile) Eulogio Robles Pinochet X	(Chile) Estanislao del Canto

Strength
1,200	1,700

Casualties and losses
400	76

The Battle of Pozo Almonte was an engagement fought during the Chilean Civil War of 1891 between Balmacedist and Congressional forces on 6 March 1891. The Congressional victory eventually led to the junta gaining control of all of northern Chile.

== Bibliography ==
- Francisco Antonio Encina & Leopoldo Castedo (2006), Historia de Chile. Balmaceda y la Guerra Civil. Tomo IX. Santiago de Chile: Editorial Santiago. ISBN 956-8402-77-2.
