= Eulogio Robles Pinochet =

Chilean military officer

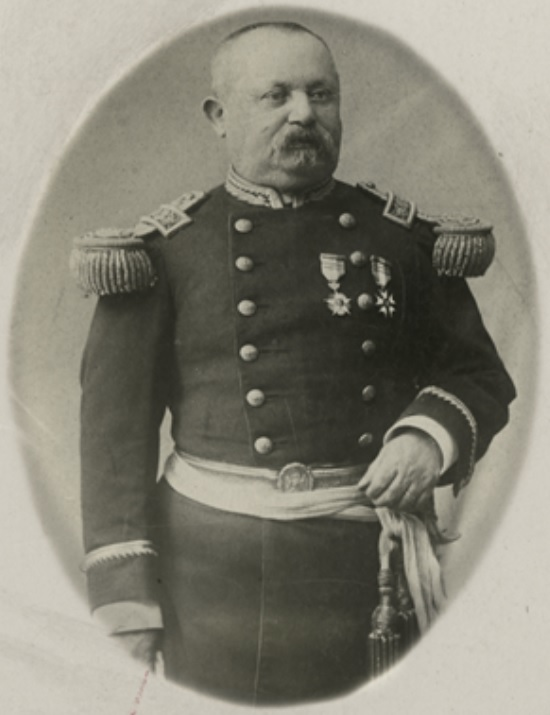
- Born: Eulogio Robles Pinochet; 1831; Los Angeles, Chile
- Died: 7 March 1891 (59-60); Pozo Almonte, Chile
- Spouse: Rosario Rodríguez Téllez
- Military career
- Allegiance: Chile
- Branch: Chilean Army
- Rank: General
- Conflicts: War of the Pacific; Chilean Civil War of 1891

Eulogio Robles Pinochet (1831 – 7 March 1891) was a Chilean military officer. He participated in the War of the Pacific and in the Chilean Civil War of 1891.

== Civil War ==
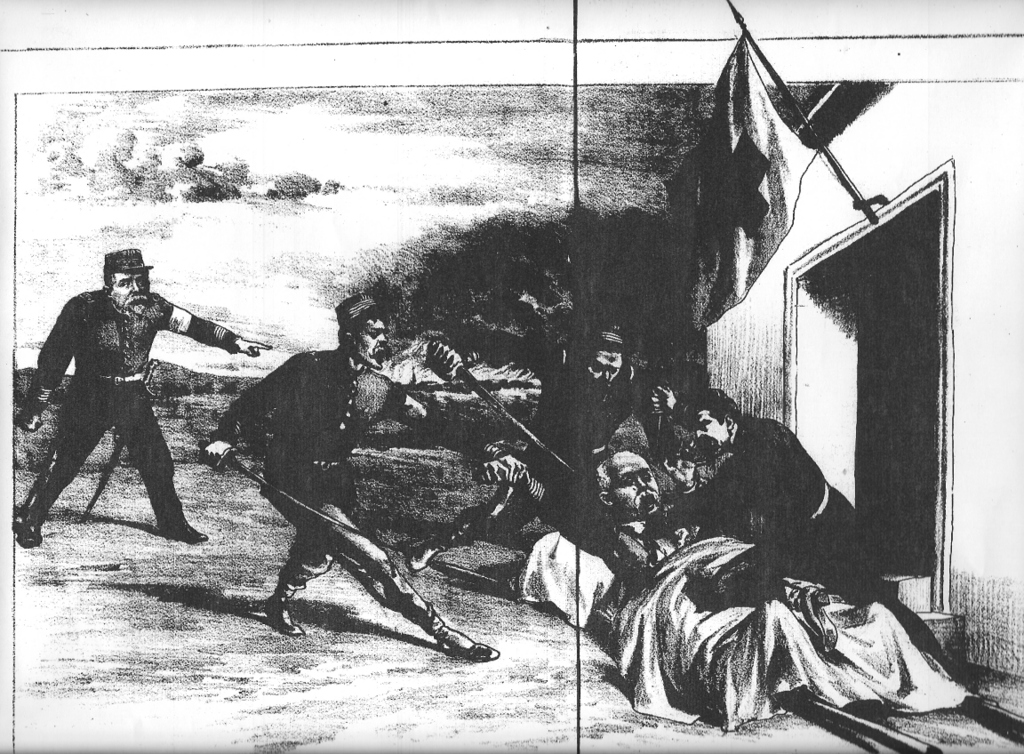
Assassination of Eulogio Pinochet

During the 1891 Civil War Pinochet supported President José Manuel Balmaceda who appointed Pinochet as Deputy Chief of the General Staff. Pinochet took part in several battles. After the Battle of Huara on 17 February 1891 he was appointed commander of a division. He was defeated at the Battle of Pozo Almonte on 6 March 1891 and was seriously wounded. He was admitted to a Red Cross field hospital but was found by the revolutionary rebels and executed.

He posthumously received the rank of brigadier general .
