= First Battle of Pucará =

Coordinates: 33.4447045°S 70.5825056°W

Battle of Pucará
- Part of the War of the Pacific
Date	February 5, 1882
Location	Pucará, Junín-Peru
Result	Peruvian victory

Belligerents
Chile	Peru

Commanders and leaders
(Chile) Estanislao del Canto	(Peru) Andrés A. Cáceres

Strength
2,000	1,230

Casualties and losses
30–200 casualties	45 casualties

The Battle of Pucará (Spanish: Batalla de Pucará) was fought on February 5, 1882, during the Sierra Campaign of the War of the Pacific. With a two-to-one superiority in numbers and even more in artillery, the Chilean army under the command of Colonel Estanislao del Canto was unable to destroy the little Peruvian army of General Cáceres, and withdrew to the town of Pucará leaving the Peruvian army to continue its strategic retreat.
