= Estanislao del Canto =

Chilean military officer (1840–1923)

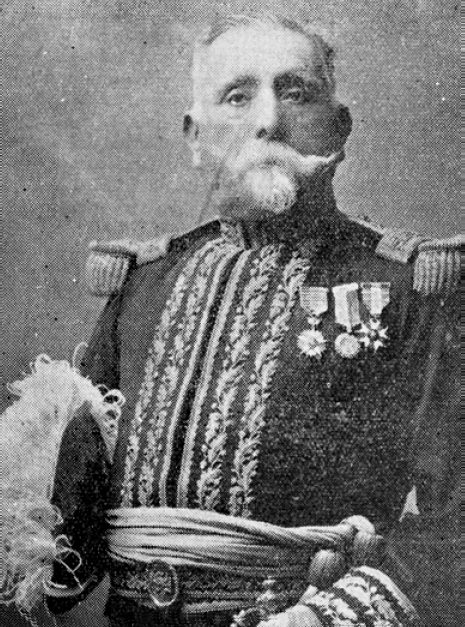
- Born: Estanislao del Canto Arteaga; 23 November 1840; Quillota, Chile
- Died: 23 June 1923 (aged 82); Santiago, Chile
- Military career
- Allegiance: Chile
- Branch: Army
- Service years: 1856–1897
- Rank: Maj. Gen.
- Conflicts: Revolution of 1859; Occupation of Araucanía; Chincha Islands War; War of the Pacific; Battle of Pucará; Chilean Civil War; Battle of Dolores; Battle of Pozo Almonte; Battle of Concón; Battle of Placilla

Estanislao del Canto Arteaga (23 November 1840 – 23 June 1923) was a Chilean military figure.

Del Canto entered the military school in 1856 and graduated as sublieutenant, beginning his active duty on 1859 due to the revolution of that same year. He played a major role in the War of the Pacific (1879–1883) and the Chilean Civil War (1891), as well as participating in the Occupation of the Araucanía (1861–1883) and the Chincha Islands War (1864–1865).

He was married to Doralisa Toske.
