= Battle of Placilla =

Engagement during the 1891 Chilean Civil War

- Part of the 1891 Chilean Civil War
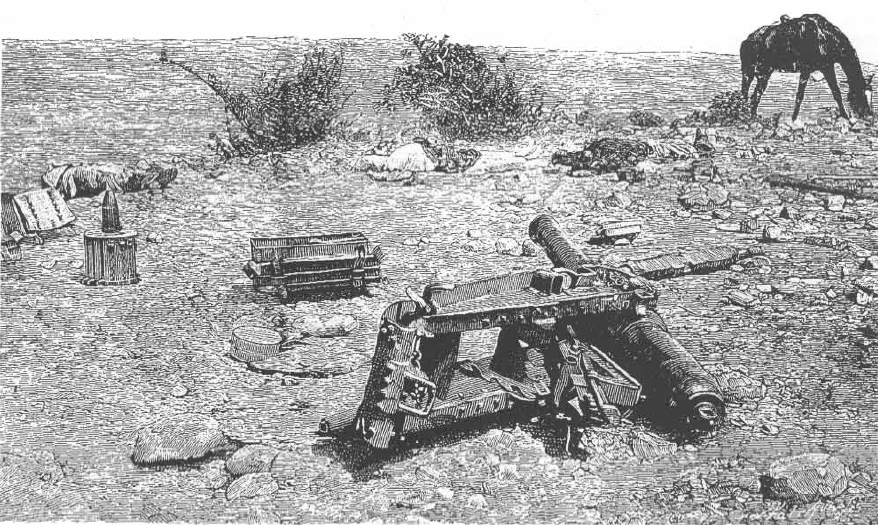
- Two pro-Balmaceda generals, killed in the last battle near Valparaíso.
Date	28 August 1891
Location	Placilla de Peñuelas, Valparaíso Province, Chile
Result	Congressionist victory

Belligerents
(Chile) Balmaceda Government	(Chile) Congressionist Junta

Commanders and leaders
(Chile) Orozimbo Barbosa †	(Chile) Estanislao del Canto

Strength
9,500	11,000

Casualties and losses
1,115 dead 2,500 wounded	2,070 dead and wounded

The Battle of Placilla was an engagement fought during the Chilean Civil War of 1891 between Balmacedist and Congressional forces on 28 August 1891. The Congressist victory in the battle effectively determined the outcome of the war. Congressist troops entered Santiago on August 30. President José Manuel Balmaceda committed suicide inside the Argentine embassy in Santiago on 19 September.

== Gallery ==
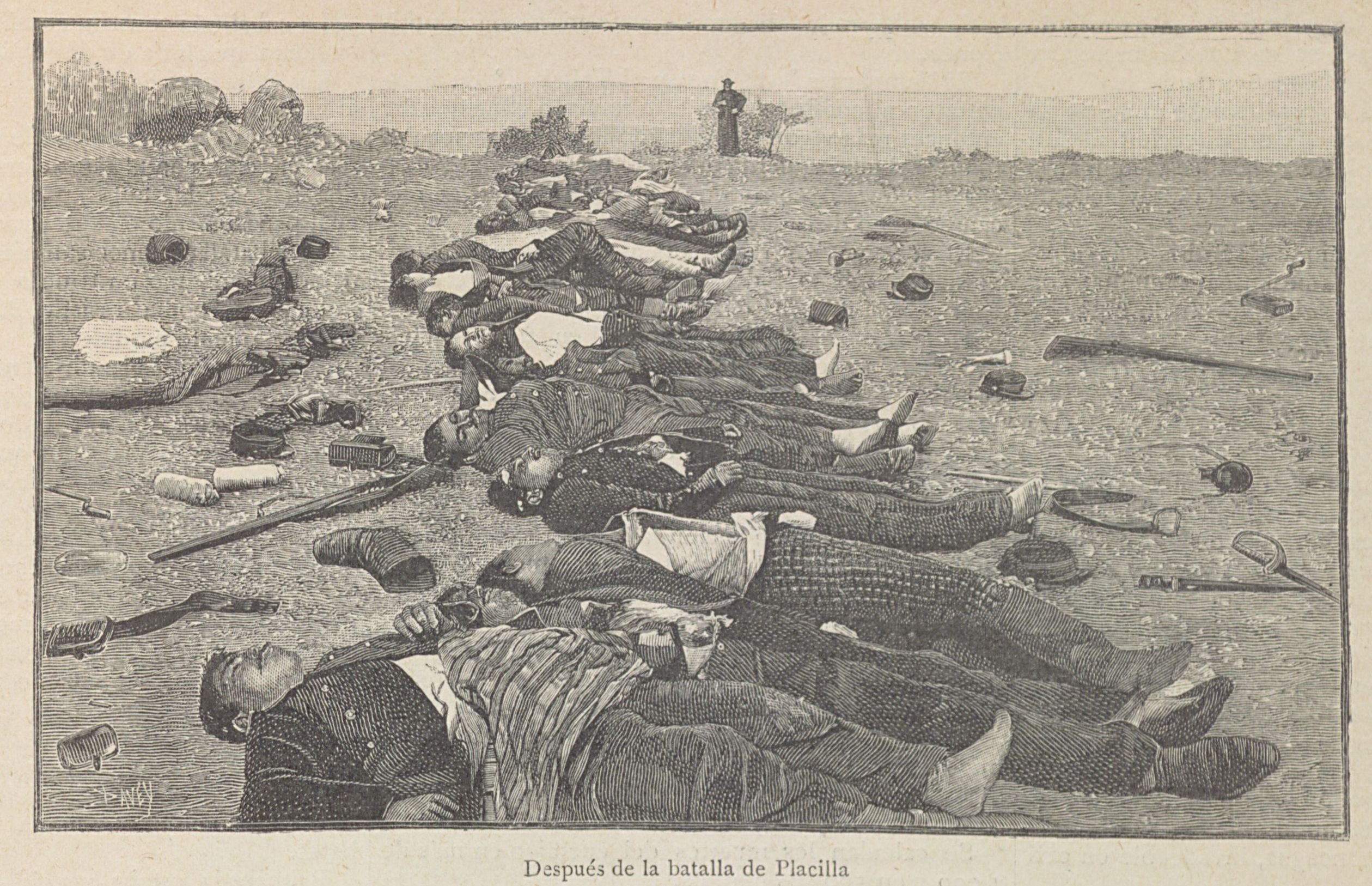
After the Battle of Placilla illustration
