= Rafael de la Barra López =

Chilean lawyer and politician

House of Representatives, Democratic Republic of Chile
- In office 1855–1864
- Preceded by: José Vergara Galeas
- Succeeded by: Nicolás Figueroa Brito
- Constituency: Quillota and Limache

Personal details
- Born: 1810 Santiago de Chile, Viceroyalty of Peru
- Died: 1894 (aged 83–84) Chile, Santiago, Chile
- Citizenship: Chile
- Party: Conservative Party
- Occupation: Lawyer

Rafael de la Barra López (1810–1894) was a Chilean lawyer and politician. He was born in Santiago in 1810. He died in the same city in 1894. He was the son of Juan Francisco de la Barra Loaiza and Mercedes López Villaseñor, and nephew of Melchor León de la Barra.

== Professional career ==
Rafael de la Barra López studied at the Instituto Nacional and graduated as a lawyer on 11 December 1840. He taught civil law classes at the Institute and later at the University of Chile. He worked as a lawyer for the Municipality of Santiago and the Administration.

== Political career ==
Rafael de la Barra López joined the Conservative Party, supporting the candidacy of Manuel Bulnes and Manuel Montt, earning him the appointment as Secretary of the Ministry of Finance. He made trips to Europe on behalf of Chile, as plenipotentiary minister to London, Berlin and Moscow.

He was elected MP for Quillota three times between 1855 and 1864, integrating the Standing Committee on Finance and Industry, as well as Education and Welfare. He was Clerk of the House of Representatives in 1859.

He became Plenipotentiary Minister of Chile to the Vatican in 1870 and member of the Legation in the United States in 1876.

== Bibliography ==
- Chile a Color: Biografías ((in English): Chile in Color: Biographies); Sergio Aguirre Mac-Kay; Editorial Antártica, Santiago de Chile, Chile, 1986, volume 1.
- Diccionario Histórico, Biográfico y Bibliográfico de Chile: 1800–1928 ((in English): Historic, Biographic and Bibliographic Dictionary of Chile); Virgilio Figueroa; Establecimientos Gráficos “Balcells & Co.”, Santiago de Chile, 1929; volume II.
