= Orozimbo Barbosa =

Chilean politician and military figure

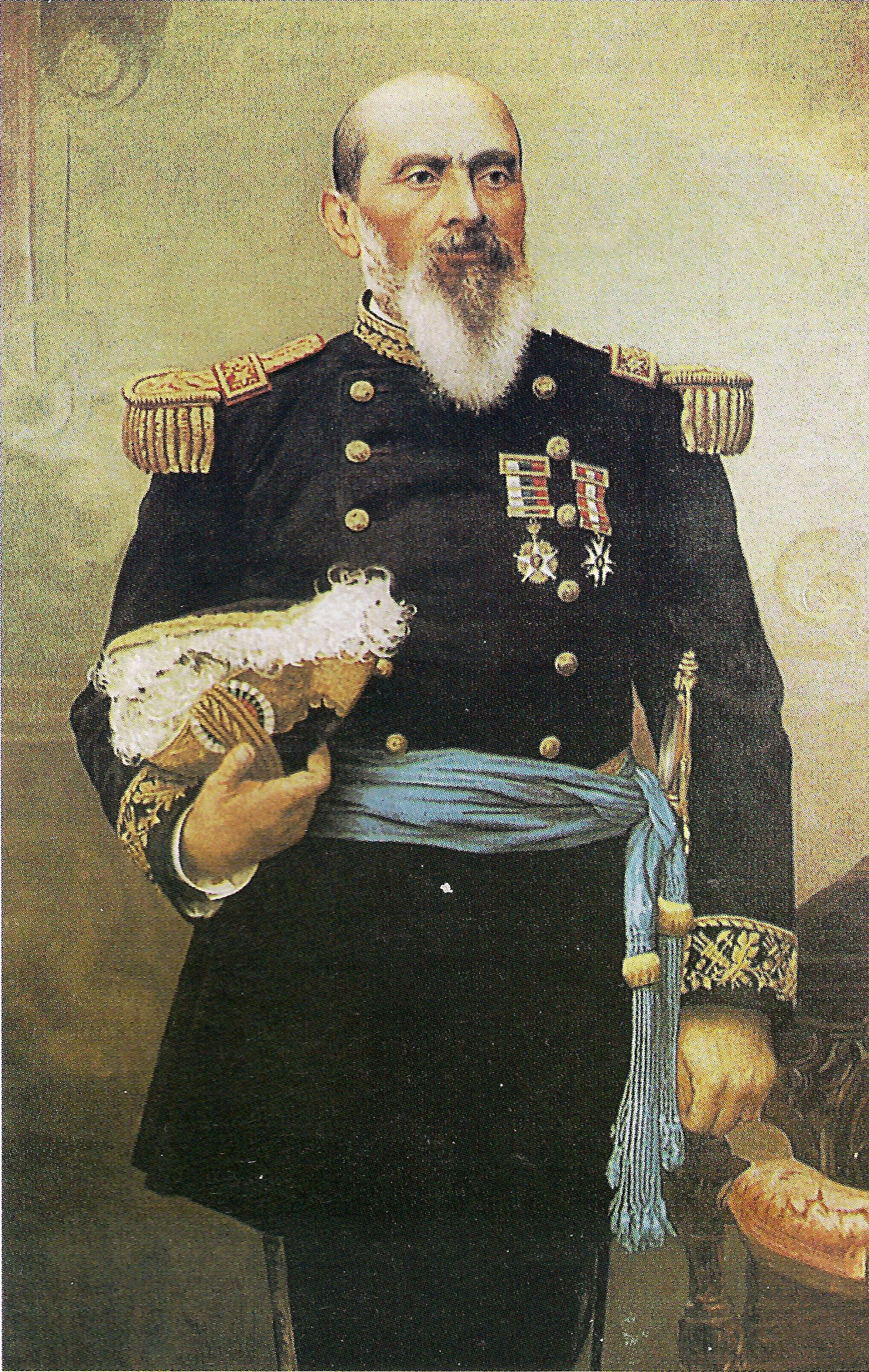
- Born: 1838; Chillán, Chile
- Died: 1891 (aged 52–53); Placilla, Chile
- Military career
- Allegiance: Chile
- Branch: Army
- Service years: 1856 - 1891
- Conflicts: Occupation of Araucanía; Campaign of 1869; War of the Pacific; Battle of Tacna; Battle of Arica; Battle of El Manzano; Occupation of Lima; Chilean Civil War; Battle of Concón; Battle of Placilla

Orozimbo Barbosa Puga (March 5, 1838 – August 28, 1891) was a Chilean politician and military figure who played a major role in the Occupation of the Araucanía (1861–1883), the War of the Pacific (1879–1883) and the Chilean Civil War (1891).
