= Francisco Bilbao Workers Party =

The Francisco Bilbao Workers Party (Spanish: Partido Obrero Francisco Bilbao) was a political party in Chile. The party was established in 1898, and was named after Francisco Bilbao. The party was founded by Ricardo Guerrero, who was inspired by Marxian theory. Local branches of the party were established in sixteen cities. The programme of the party was published in 1899, with a clear anti-militarist and anti-clerical orientation.

The Santiago de Chile-based newspaper El Trabajo of Alejandro Gonzalez was linked to the party.

The party was a precursor of the Socialist Party founded in 1901.
