= José Ravest y Bonilla =

Chilean lawyer (1823–1900)

José Ravest y Bonilla (August 1823 – September 18, 1900) was a Chilean lawyer, writer, and judge.

== Biography ==
Ravest y Bonilla was born in La Serena, Chile. His parents were Lt. Col. Ramón Ravest y Castillo, who served in the war of independence, and Mrs. Tadea Bonilla. He studied humanities at the Colegio Literario de la Serena and studied natural sciences under Ignacio Domeyko. From an early age, he was among the best students at his secondary school. In 1837 he began to study teaching at the Liceo de la Serena, distinguishing himself as a remarkable Latinist. Having moved to Santiago, in 1841, he entered the Instituto Nacional, beginning the study of law in the university section. At this school he earned the appreciation of rector Francisco de Borja Solar and was appointed a professor of humanities.

He received his law degree on January 20, 1849, and he returned to La Serena, where he held important public positions. Beginning in 1852, he served the town and the country in university and charity committees, in the municipal government, and in the judiciary, being a judge and prosecutor. In 1891 he was appointed by President Balmaceda as Minister of the Court of Appeals of Santiago. He distinguished himself as a writer, both in newspapers and in books, in defense of the law. He was editor of La Coquimbano, published in La Serena, and wrote several very significant legal works. Several of his unpublished works of jurisprudence were destroyed in a fire at his home in La Serena, in 1893. He died in La Serena on September 18, 1900.

== Works ==
Among his most important works were Codificación Agrícola de Chile; Proyecto de Código Rural; Anotaciones al Proyecto de Código de Enjuiciamientos; Estudio comparado del Proyecto de Reforma del Código de Minería; El nombramiento de los Jueces en Chile; El Nuevo Código de Minería de Chile, y La Propiedad Minera Carbonífera. His Codificación Agrícola de Chile was awarded the gold medal in the National Exhibition of 1884.
