= Ulises Poirier =

Chilean footballer (1897-1977)

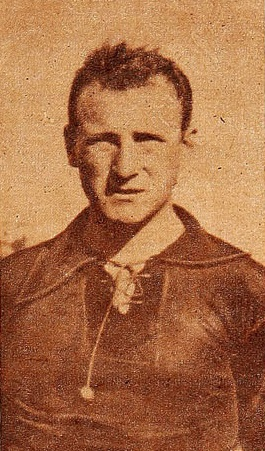

Personal information
- Full name: Ulises Dagoberto Poirier Puelma
- Date of birth: 2 February 1897
- Place of birth: Quillota, Chile
- Date of death: 9 March 1977 (aged 80)
- Height: 1.65 m (5 ft 5 in)
- Position: Defender

International career
Years	Team	Apps	(Gls)
1919–1930	Chile	16	(0)

Ulises Dagoberto Poirier Puelma (2 February 1897 – 9 March 1977) was a Chilean football defender.
