= Government Junta of Chile (1891) =

Short-lived Chilean government

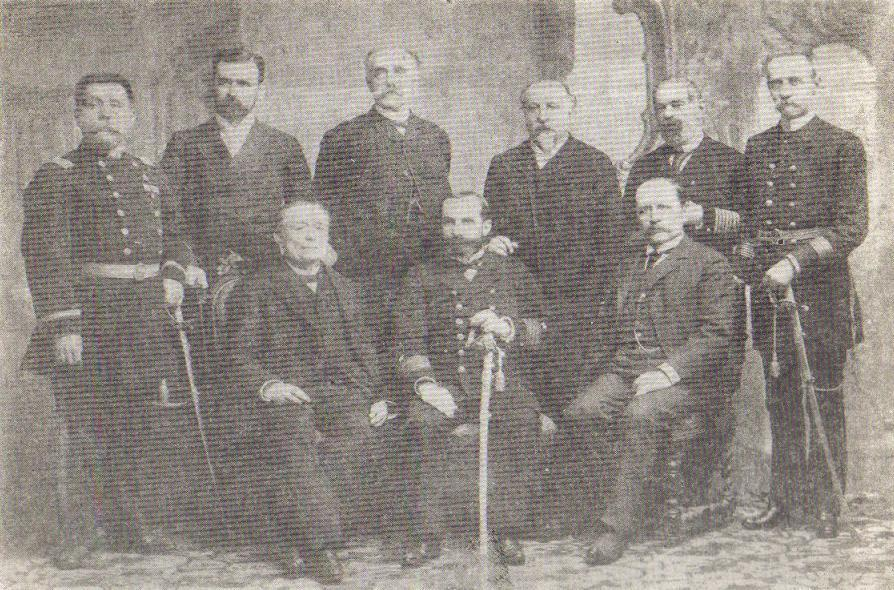
Members of the Revolutionary Junta (sitting), surrounded by the revolutionary ministers

The Revolutionary Junta of Iquique (Spanish: Junta Revolucionaria de Iquique) (April 13, 1891 - December 26, 1891), was the political structure that was established by the Chilean Congress and Admiral Jorge Montt to challenge the power of Chilean President José Manuel Balmaceda after the navy insurrection that started the 1891 Chilean Civil War. The junta ruled the country until Admiral Jorge Montt assumed power as the new president after Balmaceda's defeat and suicide in September 1891.

== Creation ==
A conflict had been simmering for a long time between the National Congress and the President over the extent of the constitutional powers of each. In January 1891, the conflict led to the 1891 Chilean Civil War, that broke out between the presidential and the congressional forces. President José Manuel Balmaceda was supported by the regular army and a small part of the navy. Most of the navy, under the command of captain Jorge Montt, supported Congress. Captain Montt, who also led the congressional forces together with General Emil Korner, captured the northern provinces and organized a parallel government in the city of Iquique. Once there they proceeded to raise and organize an army, which eventually they transported south to fight against the presidential forces.

== Members ==
Position	Name	Background	Notes
President	Jorge Montt Alvarez	Navy Captain	
Member	Waldo Silva Algüe	Vice President of the Senate	
Member	Ramón Barros Luco	President of the Chamber of Deputies	

== History ==
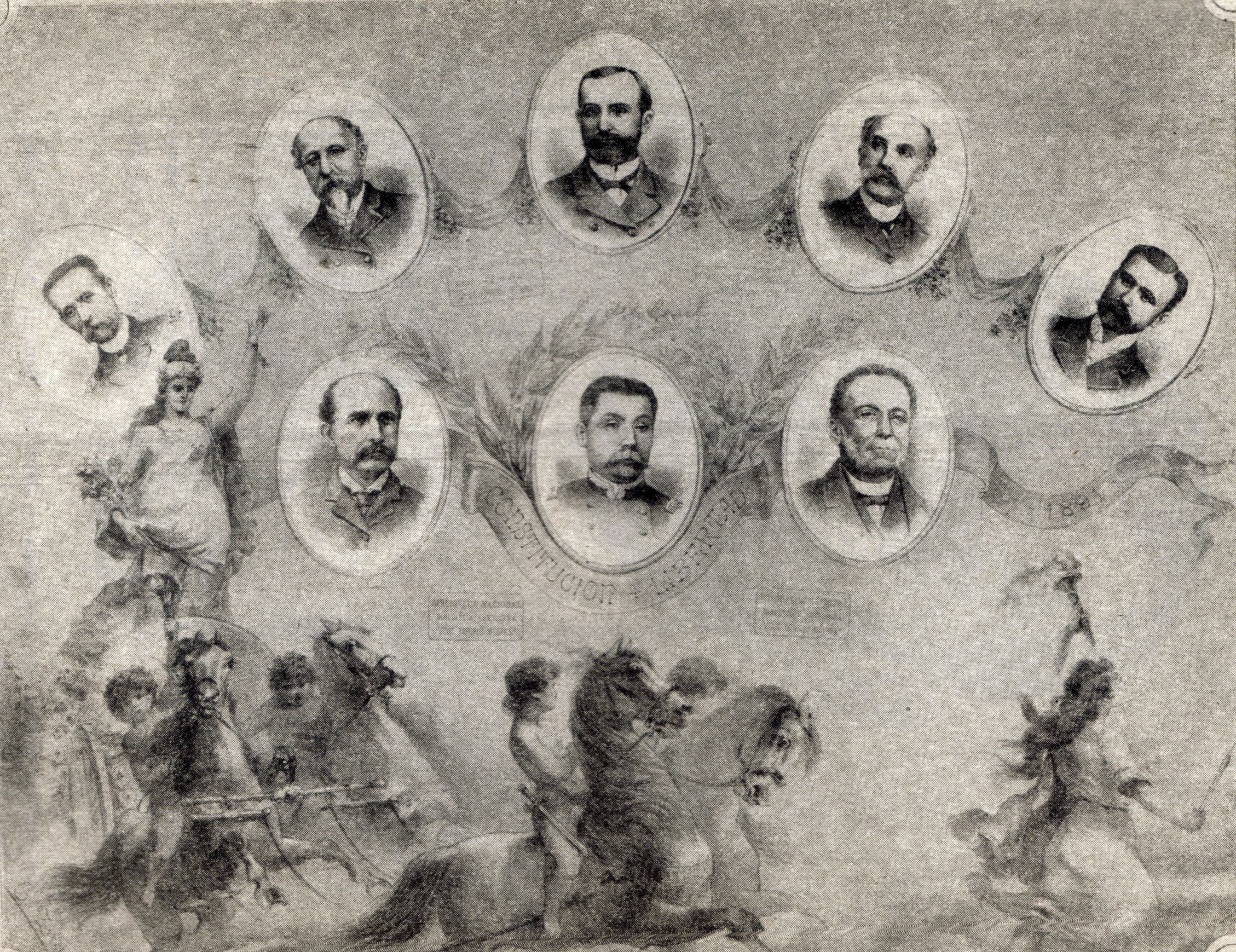
Allegory of the members of the Revolutionary Junta (including the revolutionary ministers)

The Revolutionary Junta, created on April 13, had little direct political participation, since almost all its effort was focused on the military effort. Firmly established in Iquique prosecuted the war vigorously, and by the end of April the whole area was in the hands of the "rebels" from the Peruvian border to the outposts of the Balmacedists at Coquimbo and La Serena. The Junta now began the formation of a properly organized army for the next campaign, which, it was believed universally on both sides, would be directed against Coquimbo. The necessary arms and ammunition were arranged for in Europe; they were shipped in a British vessel, and transferred to a Chilean steamer at Fortune Bay, in Tierra del Fuego, close to the Straits of Magellan and the Falkland Islands, and thence carried to Iquique, where they were safely disembarked early in July 1891. A force of 10,000 men was now raised by the junta, and preparations were rapidly pushed forward for a move to the south with the object of attacking Valparaiso and Santiago, because in a few months the arrival of the new ships from Europe would reopen the struggle for command of the sea so the Congressional party could no longer aim at a methodical conquest of successive provinces, but was compelled to attempt to crush the dictator at a blow.

After his forces were overcome, Balmaceda fled to the Argentinian embassy where he stayed for one month, then committed suicide rather than surrender to the new government. The Government Junta took control from General Manuel Baquedano, who had succeeded President Balmaceda in order to avoid the continuance of hostilities, and ruled until new elections were held, that elected Captain Montt as new President.

== See also ==
- History of Chile
- List of Government Juntas of Chile
- List of Heads of State
