= 1908 in Chile =

- Decades: 1880s; 1890s; 1900s; 1910s; 1920s
- See also: Other events of 1908; Timeline of Chilean history

The following lists events that happened during 1908 in Chile.

== Incumbents ==
- President of Chile: Pedro Montt

== Events ==
- 8 January – The General Velásquez football club is founded.

== Births ==
- 1 March – Eberardo Villalobos (d. 1964)
- 26 June – Salvador Allende, politician (d. 1973)
- 3 July – Héctor Croxatto, Chilean physiologist (d. 2010)
- 21 August – Guillermo Arellano (d. 1999)

== Deaths ==
- 21 April – Carlos Pezoa Véliz (b. 1908)
- 16 May – Mariano Casanova
