= 1971 in Chile =

- Decades: 1950s; 1960s; 1970s; 1980s; 1990s
- See also: Other events of 1971; Timeline of Chilean history

The following lists events that happened during 1971 in Chile.

== Incumbents ==
- President of Chile: Salvador Allende

== Events ==
- date unknown – Cautín Agrarian Revolt (1971)

=== January ===
- 1 January - David Baytelman Goldenberg, vice president of the Agrarian Reform Corporation (CORA) declared "The government's tendency is that there is no individual ownership of the land."
- January 4 - The social program 1/2 Liter of milk is implemented.

Presidential decree No. 2071 pardoned 43 left-wing extremists who were fugitives or sentenced to leave the underground Luciano Cruz,Miguel and Edgardo Enriquez, Juan Bautista Jouchen (whose brother was head of the Silo organization in Concepción), Sergio Zorilla, Humberto Sotomayor and Max Joel Marambio.

- January 5 - In the Cámara de Diputados, the socialist deputy Mario Palestro accused the Ministers of the Supreme Court of being "pimps", matchmakers and "bastards".
- President Salvador Allende gives a presidential pardon to several members of the MIR during a speech in the city of Valparaíso.
- January 10 - President Salvador Allende offers political asylum to 17 foreigners, including Osvaldo Peredo.

January 11 - President Salvador Allende announces that as of that day the shares of the main banks operating in the country will be bought, beginning the "Statization" of banking.

- January 14 - 70 Brazilian guerrillas receive political asylum in Chile.
- January 19- Raul Quezada Moreno, a 52-year-old farmer, is assassinated by members of the Revolutionary Peasant Movement on his farm in Rinconada de Teno, Maule Region.
- January 24- The revolutionary peasant movement makes an illegal takeover in the commune of María Pinto Declaring it as The first commune free of the Momios in Chile.

=== February ===
- February 1–5 members of the Organized Vanguard of the People (VOP) are captured after a violent confrontation with Carabineros.
- February 2 - The Minister of Agriculture, Jacques Chonchol declared that there would be no individual allocation of land and referred to the plan to make state farms.
- Due to the Absence of the Christian Democracy, a constitutional accusation filed by the National Party against the Minister of Justice, Lisandro Cruz Ponce, was rejected.
- The Production Development Corporation (CORFO) orders the withdrawal of the deposits of its affiliates from private banks.
- February 3 - The unemployment reaches 69,400 people only in Santiago.
- February 4 - In Valparaíso the president Salvador Allende declares I am president of the Popular Unity nor am I president of all Chileans I am not a hypocrite I am not president of all Chileans.
- February 5 - At the Nilahue farm in Pumanque, farmer Jorge Barragona Puelma dies after being shot at by armed assailants who were trying to take over his farm.
- February 9 - An act signed on the Vega farm in Padre Las Casas that put an end to the state of siege that peasant guerrillas had for 100 days.
- February 10–28 farms in the city of Chépica were taken over by a group of agitators led by the socialist deputy Joel Marambio.
- February 13 - President Salvador Allende nationalizes private banking and Zig-zag publishing house is expropriated.
- February 25 - Farmers from the Los Alamos farm in San Carlos defend their land from members of the MIR.
- February 28 - Unknown men carrying portraits of Che Guevara take over the Ihuiquen farm in Los Angeles.

=== March ===
- March 10 - The National Party presents a constitutional accusation against the communist José Oyarce Jara, Minister of Labor and Social Welfare for abuse of power and violation of constitutional order as a result of the death of Jorge Fernandez, a MIR student who collaborated in the occupation of the Moncul farm of Cautín when an explosive device exploded in his face.
- 11 March – Gualliguaica rail accident
- March 15 - a decree from the Ministry of the Interior to the Comptroller General of the Republic declares the problem of unemployment a National Calamity
- March 19 - The Tribuna newspaper is founded, belonging to the National Party, and which circulated until December 13, 1973.

=== April ===
- April 1 - The Nationalist Fatherland and Liberty is created, by Pablo Rodríguez Grez with an inaugural speech at the Nathaniel Stadium.
- April 4 - The UP government requisitions the Yarur Industry. Its owners appeal to the Commercial Court, which declares the appeal inadmissible, the owners appeal to the Supreme Court.
- Municipal elections. The Popular Unity obtained 50.4% of the votes.
- In the Aysén Province, the young Juan Millalonco, provincial vice president of the Christian Democratic Youth, was assassinated by shots fired from the headquarters of the Socialist party, with 8 detainees.
- April 9 - President Salvador Allende makes a strange speech in the National Congress "Objectivity should not exist in journalism because the supreme duty of the left-wing journalist is not to serve the truth but the revolution"
- April 15 - President Salvador Allende signs a decree that declares advertisements to be an article of first necessity.
- April 17 - Eduardo Paredes Barrientos assumes as general director of investigations.
- April 19 - In Cautín, farmer Rolando Matus, a member of the National Party, is assassinated by peasants who tried to occupy a hijuela by force.
- April 24 - Members of the People's Organized Vanguard (VOP) shoot dead a retailer in Santiago.
- April 27 - President Salvador Allende declares "We prefer not to speak of revolution but to make it a revolution towards socialism in democracy, pluralism and freedom".
- April 29-40 armed peasants assault the South farm of Lautaro and one of its residents dies of a heart attack. At the same time, the CORA takes possession of 22 properties in Bulnes.
- April 30 - Farmer Jorge Baraona dies of a heart attack while being told of the eviction of his farm recently expropriated by the government.

=== May ===
- 1 May - The Quilapayún group celebrates with President Salvador Allende the International Workers' Day in Santiago.
- 3 May - The Bank of Concepción is nationalized.
- 4 May - President Salvador Allende declares "Without a mistake for me that I am a Marxist socialist, legality is the best title".
- 6 May - 9 Uruguayan Tupamaros and 6 Mexicans expelled as a result of the Tlatelolco Massacre of 1968 are received in Chile
- May 18 - The Minister of Agriculture, Jacques Chonchol declares "Apart from the allocation of houses and orchards, there would be no individual land titles."
- May 19 - The Workers' United Center of Chile creates the vigilance committees.
- May 24 - Members of the People's Organized Vanguard assassinate police corporal Tomás Gutiérrez in an assault on a bank van.
- May 28 - CORA Vice President David Baytelman assured that "there will be no rationing"

=== June ===
- June 3 - The VOP acknowledges having murdered police corporal Tomas Gutierrez.
- Rodrigo Ambrosio, Secretary General of Popular Unitary Action Movement (MAPU) announced "the next battle must be around the elimination of the bicameral parliament and its replacement by a single chamber"
- June 8 - The VOP assassinates former interior minister Edmundo Pérez Zujovic.
- June 13 - In a confrontation, the assassins of Pérez Zujovic Arturo and Ronaldo Rivera Calderon are killed.
- June 16 - Turned into a human bomb, Heriberto Salazar Bello, Perez Zujovic's third murderer, assaults the investigation headquarters and after murdering 2 detectives commits suicide by detonating the dynamite tied to his body.
- June 23 - The police seize plans of regiments of Santiago in a Finding to the VOP.
- June 29 - Sergio Zorilla, a recently pardoned senior leader of the MIR, had to be admitted to the Barros Luco Hospital in San Miguel with a gunshot wound to the leg, arguing that the 45-caliber pistol he was carrying had dropped.

=== July ===
- July 1 - the General Directorate of Carabineros reported to the Senate information on the illegal occupation of 239 industries, 658 farms, 218 urban land and 145 educational establishments.
- The government creates the department of supply and price control boards under the Ministry of Economy whose function would be to found or promote consumer leagues called Supply and Price Control Boards (JAP).
- July 3 - another 10 Tupamaros are exiled to Chile.
- July 8 - Illapel earthquake, which could be perceived from Antofagasta to Valdivia. Its magnitude was 7.8 Richter Scale, 85 people died and it caused a minor tidal wave.
- the undersecretary of mining informs that 4 soviet experts would come to Chile.
- July 11 - The Plenary Congress approves a reform to article 10 of the Political Constitution, which establishes that the State is the absolute, exclusive, inalienable and imprescriptible owner of all mines. With this begins the nationalization of copper. President Salvador Allende designates July 11 as the "Day of National Dignity."
- July 15 - President Salvador Allende promulgates the constitutional reform that allowed the nationalization of the great copper mining in Chile.
- July 16 - 100 miristas try to storm the Los Ángeles jail.
- July 18 - A complementary election is held in the Province of Valparaíso to fill a seat in the Chamber of Deputies. The opposition candidate won.
- July 26 - Carlos Altamirano declares "the president of the republic must be empowered to dissolve the national congress".
- July 29 - President Salvador Allende participates in the 25th convention of the radical party declaring to be in a war economy
- July 31 - the young gilberto gonzalez gomez is assassinated by members of the MIR in an assault on the santa blanca vineyard in Rancagua.

=== August ===
- August 1 - The first copper strike takes place.
- August 3 - The Radical Left Party is founded.
- August 6 - 4 Soviet technicians arrive in Chile.
- August 8 - Hake, chicken, meat, beef and coffee disappear in much of Santiago.
- August 11 - Confirmation of belonging to the MIR of the murderers of Gilberto Gonzalez Gomez.
- August 14 - in strange circumstances the mirista Luciano Cruz dies.
- August 18 - National deputy Fernando Maturana denounces the "terrorist actions" in the province of Colchagua.
- August 20 - President Salvador Allende makes a visit to the commune of Chillán Viejo.
- August 25 - The first public denunciation of the dismissals of government-controlled companies takes place.
- August 26 - the fishing companies of Santiago are nationalized.

=== September ===
- September 2 - Salvador Allende makes a tour in Lima, Peru.
- September 7 - In the Red Room of the Palacio de La Moneda, the fishing agreement between Chile and the Soviet Union is formalized.
- September 8 - The National Party constitutionally accuses the Minister of Economy Pedro Vuskovic.
- September 9 The MIR takes the municipality of Las Condes.
- 7 properties are occupied in Curicó.
- September 10 - the Minister of Housing and Urban Planning, Carlos Cortes Diaz, dies.
- September 13 - The Comptroller General of the Republic publicly manifests against the expropriations.
- September 25 - a federation of women from Cuba is received by the wife of Salvador Allende, Hortensia Bussi.
- September 29 - the Government of the UP requisitions 8 of the largest textile industries in the country.

=== October ===
- October 1–5 members of the Revolutionary Armed Forces of Colombia are detained in Chile.
- October 3 - The minister of labor and social security, Luis Figueroa Mazuela, affirms "The national congress, the judiciary and the comptroller general of the republic do not correspond to the current needs of the Chilean people and for this reason they must be modified."
- October 10 - A march of Allende journalists belonging to the Association of Journalists takes place in the Alameda against the publications of the opposition newspaper El Mercurio.
- In Valdivia Carabineros began the search for Luis Ojeda, a mirista student, upon finding dynamite in his car.
- October 16 - MAPU Undersecretary of Economy Óscar Guillermo Garretón informs about the shipment of 1000 liters of milk to Cuba.
- October 17 - 6 parcels near Melipilla are blocked and 7 adults and 12 children are kidnapped by a group of 40 left-wing extremists.
- October 19 - Domingo Soto, foreman of the Cardae estate of Nancagua, dies defending his land from socialist extremists.
- October 21 - Pablo Neruda receives the nobel prize for literature.
- October 24 - President Salvador Allende inaugurates the private school Blas Cañas in Valparaíso.
- October 28 - 24 sticks of dynamite, 4 military-type bombs, 12 medium bombs and an unprocessed quantity of weapons are found in the Casas Viejas property of Loncoche.
- October 29 - Eruption of Villarrica (volcano).
- October 31 - José Gregorio Liendo also known as Comandante Pepe leads the seizure of the Niltre farm in Panguipulli.

=== November ===
- November 1 - Miguel Enríquez calls on the MIR to unite against legality, to dissolve the national congress and to seize the industries.
- November 2 - 75 properties are occupied in Cautín Province.
- November 3 - Workers' United Center of Chile occupies the central illi Cajas Auxiliar branch of Citibank in Valparaíso.
- November 4 - The General Accounting Office of the Republic sends an official letter to Daniel Vergara Bustos, Undersecretary of the Interior for the entry of Socialists to Chile
- November 5 - Senior officials Cubans arrive at the Pudahuel Airport, their photography being forbidden to the media.
- November 7 - 100 people besiege the San Vicente farm in San Pedro de Atacama.
- November 10 - State visit by Fidel Castro to Chile; Fidel Castro arrives at Pudahuel Airport and meets with President Salvador Allende at his residence in Tomás Moro in Santiago.
- November 11 - Fidel Castro meets with Salvador Allende at La Moneda.
- November 12 - Fidel Castro visits Antofagasta.
- November 13 - Fidel Castro visits Tocopilla and the Pedro de Valdivia and Maria Elena nitrate offices.
- November 14 - Fidel Castro visits the Chuquicamata copper mine.
- November 16 - Fidel Castro Visits the arturo prat plaza in Iquique.
- November 17 - Fidel Castro visits the municipal stadium and the huachipato plant in Concepción, Chile
- November 18 - Fidel Castro meets with MIR students at the University of Concepción, besides visiting Playa Blanca in Lota and Tomé.
- November 19 - Fidel Castro visits Puerto Montt.
- November 20 - Fidel Castro visits Punta Arenas.
- November 24 - Fidel Castro visits the El Teniente mine.
- November 25 - Fidel Castro visits Santa Cruz.
- November 28 - Fidel Castro visits San Miguel.
- November 29 - Fidel Castro visits the United Nations Economic Commission for Latin America and the Caribbean (CEPAL) building, the State Technical University and the Estadio Santa Laura.
- November 30 - Fidel Castro Visits the sotomayor Plaza of Valparaíso.

=== December ===
- December 1 - Mass event in Santiago organized by the women's departments of the opposition parties to the government. More than 100,000 women from the most varied social classes attended, armed with pots and pans that banged heavily causing a deafening noise. It was called "the march of the saucepans". Clashes between supporters of the government and the opposition. The government declares a State of Emergency and a curfew.
- December 2-Fidel Castro makes his farewell speech before 40,000 people at the Estadio Nacional.
- December 4 - Fidel Castro leaves Chile.
- December 14 - The Municipality of La Florida is taken over by the Revolutionary Workers Front (FTR).
- December 20 - President Salvador Allende offers a pardon to 43 members of the MIR.

== Births ==
- 16 January – Francisco Pérez-Bannen
- 20 February – Marcelo Corrales
- 5 April – Nelson Parraguez
- 10 May – Felipe Rivera (d. 1995)
- 1 August – Jose Romero (Australian rules footballer)
- 12 August – Marcelo Vega
- 14 August – Luis Fuentes
- 19 August – Miguel Ponce
- 4 October – Carlos Tejas
- 25 December – Pedro Peirano

== Deaths ==
- 8 June – Edmundo Pérez Zujovic (b. 1912)
- date unknown – August Heitmann (b. 1907)
