= 1904 in Chile =

- Decades: 1880s; 1890s; 1900s; 1910s; 1920s
- See also: Other events of 1904; Timeline of Chilean history

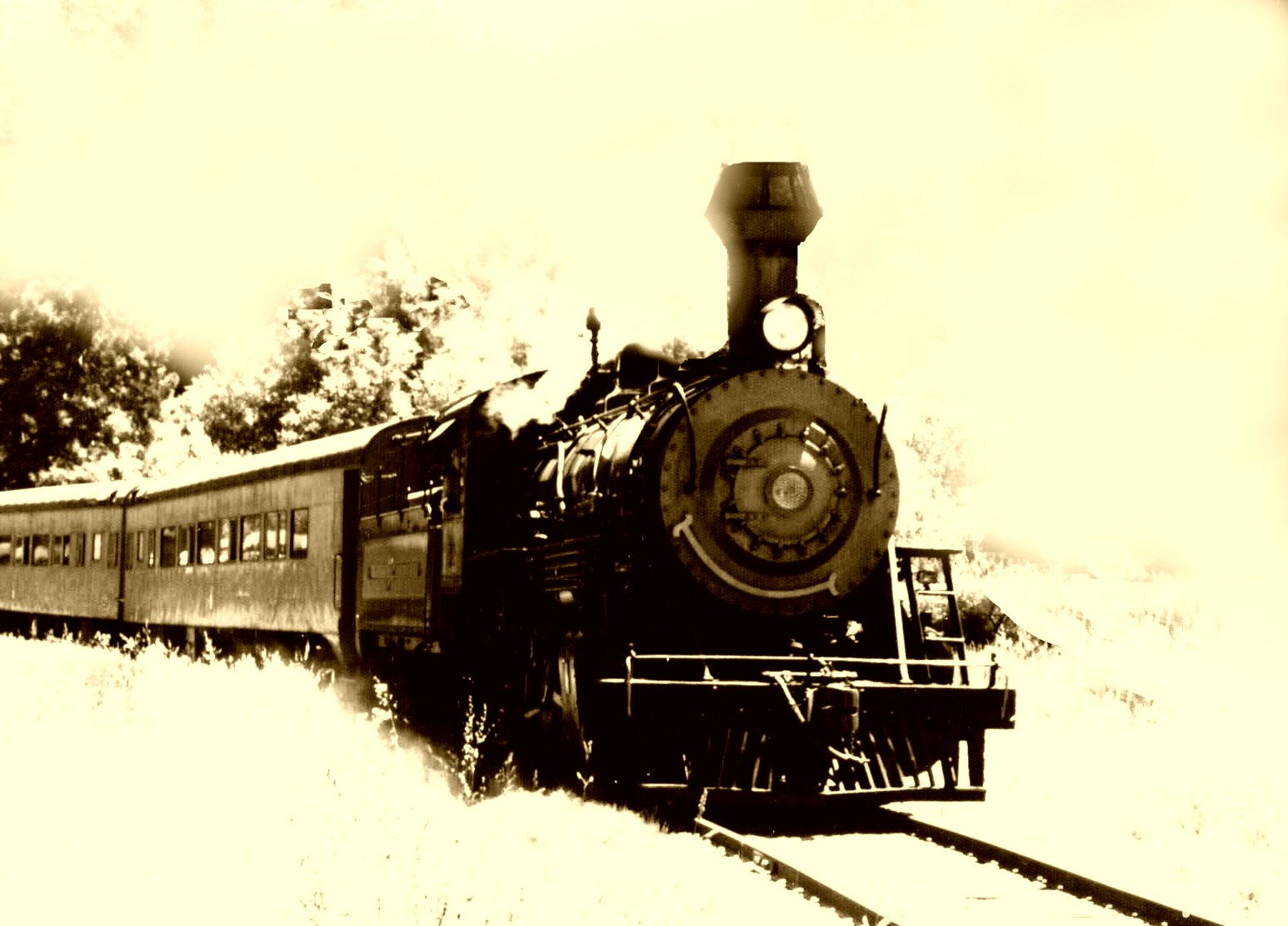
Steam locomotive pictured in Chile, 1904.

The following lists events that happened during 1904 in Chile.

== Incumbents ==
- President of Chile: Germán Riesco

== Events ==
- 20 October – The Treaty of Peace and Friendship (1904) is signed.

== Births ==
- 12 July – Pablo Neruda, poet and politician (d. 1973)
- 9 November – Peggy Angus, painter (d. 1993 in England)

== Deaths ==
- 23 July – Rodolfo Amando Philippi, botanist (b. 1808)
