= 1905 in Chile =

- Decades: 1880s; 1890s; 1900s; 1910s; 1920s
- See also: Other events of 1905; Timeline of Chilean history

The following lists events that happened during 1905 in Chile.

== Incumbents ==
- President of Chile: Germán Riesco

== Events ==
- October – Meat riots

== Births ==
- date unknown – Roberto Rey (d. 1972)
- 10 May – Víctor Morales (Chilean footballer) (d. 1938)
- 25 May – Germán Picó Cañas (d. 1988)
- 17 August – Jorge Urrutia (d. 1981)

== Deaths ==
- 8 May – Delfina de la Cruz, pianist and First Lady of Chile (born 1837)
- 5 October – Carlos Walker Martínez, lawyer, politician and poet (born 1842)
