= 1969 in Chile =

- Decades: 1940s; 1950s; 1960s; 1970s; 1980s
- See also: Other events of 1969; Timeline of Chilean history

The following lists events that happened during 1969 in Chile.

== Incumbents ==
- President of Chile: Eduardo Frei Montalva

== Events ==
=== February ===
- 1 February - The broadcasts of the local Televisión Nacional de Chile station begin in Punta Arenas.

=== March ===
- 2 March – Chilean parliamentary election, 1969
- 9g March - Puerto Montt Massacre
- 25 March - The La Silla Observatory is inaugurated in the current Coquimbo Region.

=== April ===
- 28 April - Crash of LAN Chile Flight 160. A Boeing 727 from Buenos Aires crashed in a field near Colina. There were no deaths or injuries.

=== May ===
- 21 May - The transmissions of the third station of National Television of Chile begin, this time in the city of Talca.
- 26 May - Chile signs the Andean Pact.
- 29 May - Construction begins on Line 1 of the Santiago Metro, that would unite the Civic District of Santiago with the Barrancas sector.

=== June ===
- 15 June - The Huanchaca street scandal occurs, when 9 young homosexuals were detained in a house located at number 352 of said street in the city of Antofagasta and arrested until 2 July, in which they suffered mistreatment and abuse.

=== August ===
- A binational commission sets the maritime limits between Chile and Peru through two lighthouses on each side of the border.

=== September ===
- 18 September - Official broadcasts of Chile's National Television begin in Santiago.

=== October ===
- 21 October – Tacnazo insurrection

=== November ===
- 12 November - Flight 87 of LAN Chile was hijacked, considered the first air piracy attack in national history
- 22 November - The Radical Democracy political party was founded.

=== December ===
- 3 December - An Air France Boeing 707 exploded in midair and fell into the sea two minutes after taking off at 7:03 p.m. from Maiquetía bound for Lisbon and Paris. 62 people died. The plane had arrived in Venezuela from Santiago de Chile and the flight was 24 hours late due to strikes in France.

== Births ==
- 7 January – Raimundo Tupper (d. 1995)
- 28 January – Fernando Cornejo (d. 2009)
- 15 March – Juan Cristóbal Guarello
- 10 May – Javier Margas
- 22 June – Ronald Fuentes
- 4 July – Alejandra Fosalba
- 14 July – Carlo de Gavardo (d. 2015)
- 27 August – Karen Doggenweiler
- 18 September – Rafael Araneda
- 15 October – Roberto Artiagoitia
- 6 December – Rodrigo Vásquez Schroder
- 24 December – Luis Musrri
- 27 December – Miguel Cerda

== Deaths ==
- 9 February – Manuel Plaza (b. 1900)
