= 1970 in Chile =

- Decades: 1950s; 1960s; 1970s; 1980s; 1990s
- See also: Other events of 1970; Timeline of Chilean history

The following lists events that happened during 1970 in Chile.

== Incumbents ==
- President: Eduardo Frei Montalva (until 4 November), Salvador Allende (starting 4 November)

== Events ==
=== February ===
- 20 February - Chile signs a trade agreement with Cuba, despite the OAS ban.

=== March ===
- 1 March - The Teletrece newscast, produced by Universidad Católica de Chile TV, begins its broadcasts.

=== April ===
- 22 April - The National Statistics Institute carries out the XIV Population Census and the III Housing Census.

Creation of the national board of kindergartens (JUNJI).

=== August ===
- 1 August - The newspaper Atacama is founded in the city of Copiapó.

=== September ===
- 4 September - Chilean presidential election, 1970; The Popular Unity candidate, Salvador Allende, obtained the relative majority with 36.3% of the votes. The right-wing candidate, Jorge Alessandri, obtained 34.9% of the votes; and Radomiro Tomić, candidate of the Christian Democracy, obtained 27.8% of the votes.
- 14 September - The latest edition of El Diario Ilustrado circulates.
- 16 September - Inauguration of the Lo Prado tunnel on Route 68, which connects Santiago de Chile with Valparaíso.
- 26 September - The newspaper El Observador is founded in the city of Quillota.

=== October ===
- 11 October - The Popular Unity accepts the constitutional guarantees proposed by the Christian Democracy as a condition to ratify Salvador Allende as President in the Plenary Congress.
- 22 October - Attack on the Commander in Chief of the Army, René Schneider. The general dies 3 days later in the Military Hospital.
- 24 October - The Full Congress ratifies Salvador Allende as the new President of the Republic for the period 1970-1976. The vote was 153 votes for Allende, 35 for Jorge Alessandri and 7 blank.
- 26 October - Carlos Prats is appointed Commander in Chief of the Army.
- 28 October - The newspaper La Prensa, belonging to the Journalistic Society of The South, is founded in Santiago and circulated until February 21, 1974.

=== November ===
- 3 November - Salvador Allende assumes the Presidency of the Republic for the period 1970-1976.
- 4 November - A massive celebration of adherents of the Popular Unity takes place before the inauguration of Salvador Allende in the Estadio Nacional of Santiago.
- 5 November - President Salvador Allende makes his first speech at the Estadio Nacional in Santiago emphasizing the objectives of his government by declaring "I make Fidel Castro's phrase mine in this government you can put your feet but never your hands".
- 6 November - Salvador Allende is ratified by Congress, his first action being to ratify Carlos Prats as Commander in Chief of the Army.
- 8 November - In the commune of San Miguel the first monument in the world dedicated to Che Guevara is erected.
- 10 November - Interior Minister José Tohá announces the dissolution of the Carabineros mobile group after decades of existence, this body being replaced by the Prefecture of Special Forces.
- 12 November - The government of President Salvador Allende reestablishes diplomatic relations with the island of Cuba.
- 13 November - The Miristas Andres Pascal Allende, nephew of Salvador Allende, and 7 other guerrillas cease to be fugitives from justice by order of President Salvador Allende.
- 16 November - President Salvador Allende manages to get Chile to establish diplomatic relations with North Korea for the first time.
- 30 November - National commotion causes the suicide of Antonieta Macchi Bonadey, a 50-year-old woman who was kidnapped by an unknown group of 30 armed peasants who broke into her farm La Tregua near the city of Valdivia in the south of the country.

=== December ===
- 1 December - President Salvador Allende signs his first expropriation decree affecting the textual factory Bellavista Oveja Tomé in the town of Bellavista in the commune of Tomé in the north of the city of Concepción, Bío Bío Region.
- 2 December - Under strange circumstances, Arnoldo Rios Alarcon, a MIR student from the University of Concepción, dies in a confrontation with the Ramona Parra Brigade.
- President Salvador Allende makes his first visit abroad holding a conference at the University of Guadalajara in Mexico.
- 8 December - President Salvador Allende makes a visit to the San Jose de Chuchunco population seeking to convince the residents to abandon the place which had been usurped since October 18 without any success.
- 23 December - In Valparaíso, the Plaza Salvador Allende is inaugurated next to Parque Italia, at the intersection of Avenida Pedro Montt and Calle Victoria under the name "Plaza del Pueblo".
- 30 December - President Salvador Allende announces to the country through radio and television the policy of nationalization of the banking system. He would send a bill to Congress the following week to nationalize banking.

== Births ==
- 26 March – Luis Chavarría
- 18 April – Jorge Zabaleta
- 8 May – Marcela Vacarezza
- 13 May – Fernando Vergara
- 11 June – Miguel Ramírez
- 1 July – Luciano Cruz-Coke
- 30 October – Rodrigo Barrera
- 27 November – Jaime Riveros
- 3 December – Felipe Braun
- 18 December – Fernando Solabarrieta
- 19 December – Cristián Montecinos

== Deaths ==
- 25 October – René Schneider (b. 1913)
- 8 December – Arturo Bucciardi (b. 1914)
