= 1907 in Chile =

- Decades: 1880s; 1890s; 1900s; 1910s; 1920s
- See also: Other events of 1907; Timeline of Chilean history

The following lists events that happened during 1907 in Chile.

== Incumbents ==
- President of Chile: Pedro Montt

== Events ==
- 18 January – Parliament of Coz Coz
- 21 December – Santa María School massacre

== Births ==
- 20 December – Tomas Barraza, fencer (d. 1948)

== Deaths ==
- 4 November – Diego Barros Arana, historian (b. 1830)
