= Saffi =

Saffi or Saffie may refer to:

== People ==
- Aurelio Saffi (1819–1890), Italian politician
- José Musalem Saffie (1924–2019), Chilean politician
- José Said Saffie (1930–2020) Peruvian-born Chilean businessman
- Saffie Lowe Ceesay, 21st century Gambian politician and civil servant
- Saffie Joseph Jr., a horse trainer whose horses were barred from the 2023 Kentucky Derby after two others died

== Other uses ==
- Safi, Morocco, a city in Western Morocco
- Piazza Saffi, a plaza in Forlì, Italy
- Via Saffi, a major road in Casale Monferrato, Alessandria, Italy
- Saffie, a character in the Dutch comic strip Boes

== See also ==
- Saffy (disambiguation), also includes Safy
- Safié, a 1909 opera
