= Luis Cabezas (Chilean footballer) =

Chilean footballer (born 1992)

Personal information
- Full name: Luis Hernán Cabezas Chavarría
- Date of birth: 25 March 1992 (age 34)
- Place of birth: Monte Águila, Chile
- Height: 1.84 m (6 ft 0 in)
- Position: Forward

Youth career
- 2005–2011: Naval

Senior career*
Years	Team	Apps	(Gls)
2011–2015	Naval	39	(9)
2015	IF Brommapojkarna		
2015	Huachipato	0	(0)
2015	Åtvidabergs FF U21	2	(2)
2015–2016	Naval	14	(1)
2016–2017	Deportes Limache		
2017	Estación Central		
2019	Chalatenango	8	(1)
- * Club domestic league appearances and goals

Luis Hernán Cabezas Chavarría (born 25 March 1992) is a Chilean former professional footballer who played as a forward for clubs in Chile, Sweden and El Salvador.

== Career ==
Cabezas came to Naval youth system at the age of thirteen, staying with them until 2015. In March 2015, he moved to Sweden and joined IF Brommapojkarna in the Superettan. As a player of Huachipato, in June 2015 he joined Åtvidabergs FF after a trial along with his compatriot Joaquín Cerezo.

In second half 2015, he returned to Naval until 2016, playing for Deportes Limache and Deportivo Estación Central in his homeland.

In 2019, he moved abroad again and played for Salvadoran side Chalatenango in the 2019 Apertura of the Primera División.

== Personal life ==
Cabezas is the nephew of the former Chilean international footballer Luis Chavarría.
