= 1972 in Chile =

- Decades: 1950s; 1960s; 1970s; 1980s; 1990s
- See also: Other events of 1972; Timeline of Chilean history

The following lists events that happened during 1972 in Chile.

== Incumbents ==
- President of Chile: Salvador Allende

== Events ==
=== January ===
- January 2 – The former president Eduardo Frei Montalva in a press article accuses the Popular Unity government of destroying the country.
- The president of the Communist Party, Luis Corvalán calls for revolution against the government by declaring that "the path of violence is not excluded whatever the form."
- January 4 – The Supreme Court of Justice rejects the thesis of the Executive in the appeal of the requisition of the Yarur Industry, arguing the Commercial Court was competent to hear the appeal filed by the company.
- January 6 – The existence of an agreement between Chile and Cuba to exchange school textbooks is denounced.
- January 7 – President Salvador Allende appoints the interior minister, José Tohá as the new defense minister.
- January 16 – Complementary elections of a senator for O'Higgins and Colchagua and a deputy for Linares . The opposition candidates won.
- January 25 – A new Soviet delegation arrives in Chile to discuss bilateral agreements with the UP government.
- January 28 – The Comptroller General of the Republic reports the entry of 1,178 Cubans since September 1970.

=== February ===
- February 2 – The XIII Viña del Mar International Song Festival is held, animated by César Antonio Santis and Gabriela Velasco.
- February 4 – President Salvador Allende recognizes the actions of Soviet fishing boats in artisanal areas of the country.
- February 11 – President Salvador Allende visits the Italian American Cloth Factory (FIAP) in the commune of Tomé.
- February 13 – In Lebu President Salvador Allende announces the creation of a large fishing port with credits from the Soviet Union
- February 25 – The government publicly acknowledges the increase in the black market for meat.

=== March ===
- March 7 – MAPU deputy Óscar Guillermo Garretón announces the requisition of 91 companies in the country.
- March 8 – The drop in production reaches 90% in the National Tire Industry (INSA).
- 11 March – Cuban packages
- March 14 – It is denounced in Session No. 67 of the Senate that 10 Soviet ships are authorized by President Salvador Allende to carry out "scientific research actions".
- March 17 – The Comptroller General of the Republic rejects the requisition of the Madeco industry by the Ministry of Economy.
- March 24 – There are 100 paralyzed estates in the province of Ñuble, according to the police report of the day.
- March 27 – Alfredo Joignaut,Intendant of Santiago denies permission for the so-called Freedom March.
- March 30 – The Government of Chile signed an agreement for the acquisition of 5,000 tractors from the Soviet Union.
- March 31 – A van belonging to the social assistance department of the presidency crashed 2 km from the town of Curimon, two members of the GAP were arrested and ammunition, grenades and plans of military regiments were discovered.

=== April ===
- April 2 – Nibaldo Soto Alarcón, former foreman of the La Patagua estate, in Cauquenes, committed suicide upon learning that his land had been expropriated.
- April 4 – Resolution No. 112 of the Directorate of Industry and Commerce (Dirinco), published in the Official Gazette of the Republic of Chile, announces the creation of the Supply and Price Control Boards (JAP).
- April 13 – The third United Nations Conference on Trade and Development (UNCTAD III) is held at the then Centro Cultural Gabriela Mistral in the city of Santiago.

=== May ===
- May 21 – The third United Nations Conference on Trade and Development ends.
- May 27 – Weapons are found in the vehicle of Mirista leader Edgardo Enriquez Espinoza.

=== June ===
- June 7 – A complaint is filed against the Minister of Mines Eduardo Paredes Barrientos for customs fraud for the so-called Cuban packages.
- June 21 – Photographer Antonio Quintana dies.

=== July ===
- July 6 – The Christian Democratic Party and the National Party create the Confederation of Democracy ahead of the 1973 Chilean parliamentary election.
- July 11 – Président Salvador Allende visits Saladillo, where together with the Andean miners he acknowledges that the goals for copper production will not be achieved.
- July 16 – Complementary election of a deputy for Coquimbo Amanda Altamirano Guerrero, a Popular Unity candidate, won.
- July 24 – 1,000 residents of the town of Lo Hermida de Peñalolén belonging to the MIR erect barricades and take over a service station and a supermarket.
- July 26 – In Lo Barnechea the funeral of a worker assassinated by a socialist militant is held.
- July 27 – The Senate approves a constitutional accusation against the Minister of the Interior Hernán del Canto.

=== August ===
- August 3 – 80,000 tons amounts to the country's weak wheat crop.
- August 4 – After a shootout at the Moncada Barracks camp, Hector Nieto Cayupil, a member of the National Liberation Command, is arrested.
- August 5 – 11 wounded and 165 detainees in the camps assault on the moncada barracks, Lulo Pinoche and Vietnam Heroico. In turn, there was a discovery in the camp Los Sin Casa in Lo Hermida where the communist worker Rene Saravia died.
- August 7 – President Salvador Allende visits the town of Lo Hermida.
- August 11 – The Social Democratic Party is dissolved.
- August 15 – 10 Argentines guerrillas from the Revolutionary Armed Forces (FAR) and the People's Revolutionary Army arrived at the Pudahuel Airport on a hijacked plane.
- August 17 – In Punta Arenas there is a total closure of shops in protest against the rise of the dollar. The merchant Manuel Aguilar dies in a confrontation between businessmen and the forces of order.
- August 20 – State of Emergency is decreed in the Magallanes Region due to the three-day strike of the unions due to the death of Manuel Aguilar.
- August 21 – The strike of the unions ends in Punta Arenas.
- August 22 – State of Emergency is decreed in the Santiago Metropolitan Region due to the looting of supermarkets.
- August 23 – José Ramon Jara dies in the city of Los Angeles during a confrontation of civilians protesting against the hikes who were attacked by socialists and members of the MAPU
- August 26 – The government expires the concession of the radio National Society of Agriculture of Los Ángeles.
- August 30 – The Mayor of Los Ángeles, Italo Zunino, decreed a total stoppage of activities, which left the city without activity for several days.
- Members of the military structure of the Socialist Party, sheltered at the headquarters of that political group, in the city of Concepción, shoot at a Carabineros van, assassinating Corporal Exequiel Aroca Cuevas.

=== September ===
- September 1 – Arrested and injured with contusions is the balance of the strike decreed by the Federation of secondary students (FESES) against the Minister of Education Anibal Palma.
- September 5 – President Salvador Allende declares his desire for a new constitution That the people for the first time understand that it is not from above but that it must be born from the very roots of their own conviction the fundamental letter that It will give it its existence as a worthy, independent and sovereign people.
- September 13 – As the first step for the creation and operation of the popular courts within the companies, the assembly of workers of the bio-bio promotion factory intervened by the government was considered.
- September 15 – The indigenous law 17,729 is promulgated
- September 21 – Architect and designer Luciano Kulczewski dies in Santiago at the age of 76.
- September 26 – The San Juan Earthquake could be felt in the cities of La Serena, Coquimbo, Ovalle, Illapel, La Ligua, San Felipe and Los Andes.

=== October ===
- October 4 – Fatherland and Liberty militant Patricio Jarpa was detained by members of the GAP who took him to the PDI headquarters on General Mackena Street where he was tortured by 18 hours with electricity shocks.
- October 6 – Taxpa Bimotor Accident, where eight people disappeared, when a charter flight bound for the Juan Fernández Islands plunged into the Pacific Ocean.
- October 9 – Chile truckers' strike: A national strike is called by the Confederation of Truck Owners in rejection of the government's claim to create a state-owned trucking company in the Aysén region, which would be known as the "October Strike". ».
- October 11 – President Salvador Allende participates in the World Peace Council.
- 13 October – Uruguayan Air Force Flight 571
- October 20 – Provinces in State of Emergency are raised to 20.
- October 23 – Democratic radio stations are removed from the mandatory national network
- October 25 – An extremist from Venezuela and another from Cuba were detained in a small station belonging to ODEPLAN who, in addition to being armed, were carrying a card from the presidency of the republic
- October 28 – President Salvador Allende pardons the socialist deputy Joel Marambio who was detained in Santa Cruz for kidnapping.

=== November ===
- November 2 – President Allende takes the oath in La Moneda to his new government, which includes some members of the Armed Forces. Army General Carlos Prats as Interior Minister, Admiral Ismael Huerta as Minister of Public Works and Transportation, and Air Force General Claudio Sepúlveda as Minister of Mining.
- November 5 – End of the truckers' strike
- November 10 – In Viña del Mar, a bomb is thrown into the garden of Admiral Ismael Huerta's house, which is found by his wife the next day. However it did not explode.
- November 16 – Chile will sell to the Soviet Union 20,000 walls of shoes in an agreement signed by the economy minister Pedro Vuskovic

=== December ===
- December 1 – President Salvador Allende visits Mexico City
- December 5 – 50 members of the UP with sticks and clubs under the protection of the intervener leave 9 wounded in the continental cloth industry
- December 7 – President Salvador Allende visits the Soviet Union
- December 10 – President Salvador Allende visits Cuba
- December 22 – Survivors of Uruguayan Air Force Flight 571 are rescued.

== Births ==
- 8 January – Esteban Valencia, football manager and former player
- 5 February – Tamara Acosta, actress
- 9 February – Álvaro Véliz, singer
- 31 March – Alejandro Amenábar, Chilean-Spanish film director, screenwriter and composer
- 6 April – Daniel Alcaíno, actor and comedian
- 29 May – Cristián Sánchez, journalist and television presenter
- 24 July – Julián Elfenbein, journalist, radio broadcaster and television presenter
- 22 September – Paris Inostroza, former fencer
- 4 October – Javiera Balmaceda, Chilean and American film and television producer.
- 12 November – Sergio Lagos, television presenter and personality
- 13 November – Pedro Reyes, football manager and former player
- 20 December – Carolina Goić, politician.

== Deaths ==
- 19 September – Luciano Kulczewski, architect (born 1896)
