= 1912 in Chile =

- Decades: 1890s; 1900s; 1910s; 1920s; 1930s
- See also: Other events of 1912; Timeline of Chilean history

The following lists events that happened during 1912 in Chile.

== Incumbents ==
- President of Chile: Ramón Barros Luco

== Events ==
=== June ===
- 4 June – The Socialist Workers' Party (Chile) is founded.

== Births ==
- 9 February – Edgardo Enríquez (d. 1996)
- 23 June – César Barros (d. 1992)
- 16 August – Elsa del Campillo (d. 2009)
- 27 August – Yoya Martínez (d. 2009)

== Deaths ==
- 9 July – Juan José Latorre (b. 1846)
- 30 October – Alejandro Gorostiaga (b. 1840)
