= 1973 in Chile =

- Decades: 1950s; 1960s; 1970s; 1980s; 1990s
- See also: Other events of 1973; Timeline of Chilean history

Events in the year 1973 in Chile.

== Incumbents ==
- President: Salvador Allende until September 11, Augusto Pinochet as President of the Government Junta of Chile
- Commander-in-Chief of the Chilean Army: Carlos Prats until August 23, Augusto Pinochet
- Minister of Foreign Affairs: Clodomiro Almeyda, Orlando Letelier, Clodomiro Almeyda, Ismael Huerta
- Minister of the Interior: Carlos Prats until August 23, Gerardo Espinoza, Orlando Letelier
- Minister of National Defense: Jose Toha, Clodomiro Almeyda, Carlos Prats, Orlando Letelier, Patricio Carvajal

== Events ==
=== January ===
- January 5 - Socialist Senator Maria Elena Carrera caused the country's female indignation when she declared that "Only idle women can queue up to buy"
- January 6 – Strike of the urban transport of Santiago.
- January 7 :
  - In Hamburg, a shipment of Chilean copper is seized, while an appeal was presented from the Private Company Kennecott against the State of Chile.
  - The Government announces the introduction of a "war economy", which includes food rationing and control of wheat production.
- January 8 :
  - Strike of the Chuquicamata railroad workers.
  - A militant of the Communist Party is assassinated by unknown members of Fatherland and Liberty in a rally.
- January 10 – The National Distribution Secretariat is created to order and regulate the distribution of items considered "essential".
- January 11 - Inflation reaches 180%
- January 13 – The Armed Forces reaffirm their unconditional support for the constitutional government.
- January 15 – Merchants Self-Defense Commands are formed in Santiago to boycott government measures.
- January 16 - 7,929 copper workers go on strike in rejection of the ration card
- January 20 – The workers of Canal 9 of the University of Chile, took seized by the Armed militia due to sanctions against constitutional government.
- January 26 - 700 tons of rice are discovered in an undeclared warehouse of the Supply Company for Isolated Zones (ECA)
- January 28 - The secretary general of the Christian Left, Bosco Parra, proclaims the need to build popular power
- January 30 – The senator of the Christian Democracy José Musalem suffers an attack with firearms, from which he escapes unharmed.

=== February ===
- February 2–16 exiles from Haiti arrived on Chilean soil.
- February 4 – The government reports that unemployment fell to 3.6% in December 1972.
- February 5 – Pablo Neruda resigns as ambassador to France for health reasons, returning to Chile.
- February 8 – Canal 13 begins the transmissions of its repeater in Concepción through the VHF 5 frequency, with which the local signal adopts the name of Canal 5. However, the government considers the action illegal.
- A 14-year-old boy named Oscar Pineda was shot by a group of left-wing extremists when they attacked the headquarters of the National Party in Valdivia.
- February 10 - President Salvador Allende participates in a concentration in the Estadio Nacional of Santiago together with 100,000 people, among them was the Dutch photographer Chas Gerretsen.
- February 15 – Deputy Arturo Frei Bolívar, who was running for re-election in March, was seriously wounded after he received a bullet in the skull, when leaving a proclamation in Chiguayante and the PIR senator Eugenio Velasco was attacked and wounded by supporters of popular unity while he was campaigning in Talca.
- February 19 - The newspaper La Prensa publishes that members of the Communist Brigade Ramona Parra assassinated the Christian Democrat worker Jaime Contreras Iglesias.
- February 20 – The Ministry of Interior reports that the different pre-electoral clashes between political factions have resulted in 67 people arrested, 4 dead and 120 injured.
- February 22 - A pamphlet from the Minister of Education, Jorge Tapia, entitled For a national, democratic, pluralist and popular education, goals for 1973 announcing the government project of the Unified National School (ENU).
- February 26 - Curico Unido provincial sports club is founded.
- February 27 - 10 carabineros were injured in the assault on the Llanquihue barracks perpetrated by Mirista mobs who tried to rescue their leader Sergio Gomez Flores, arrested for political violence.

=== March ===
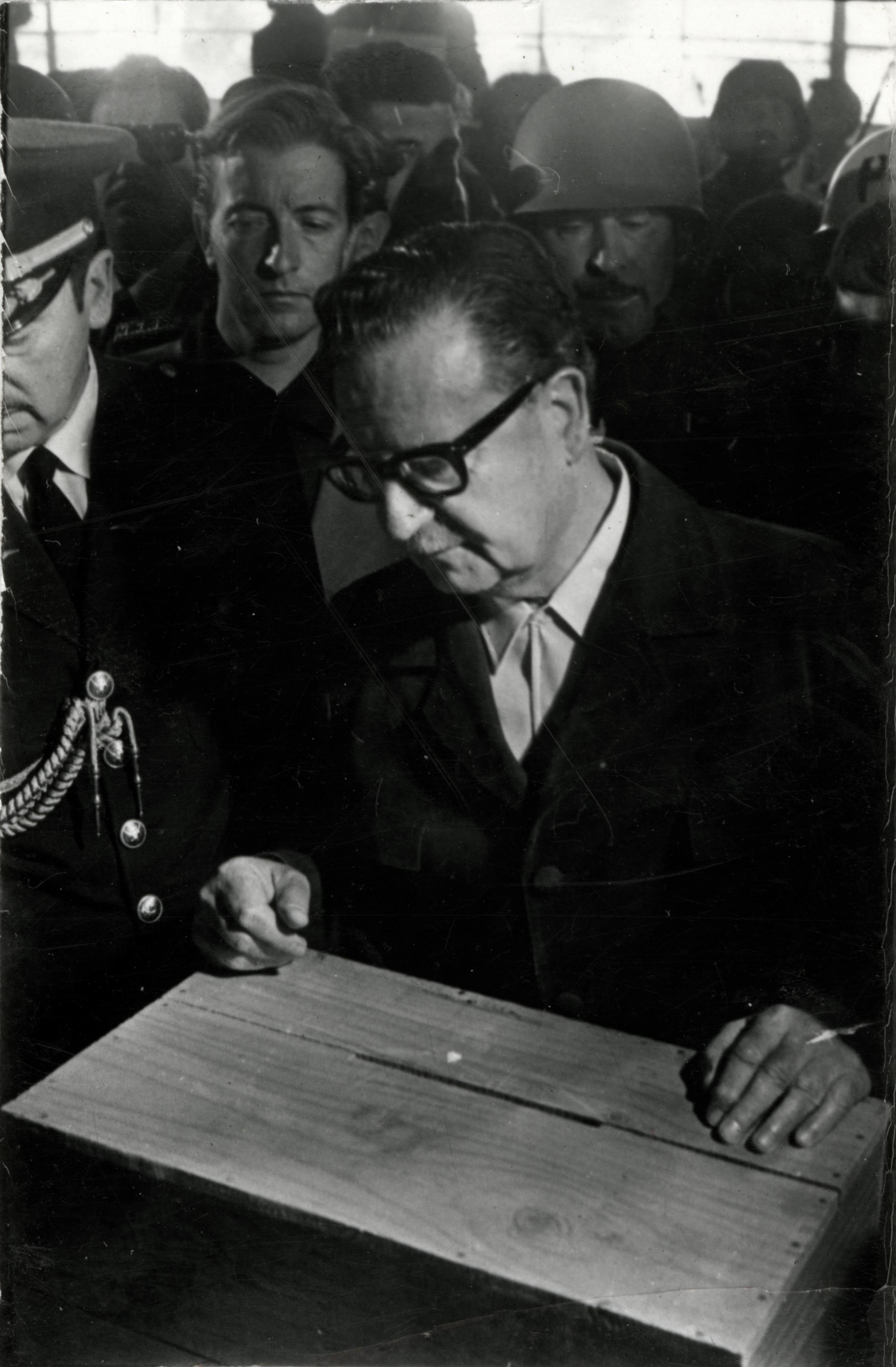
Salvador Allende voting in the 1973 parliamentary elections.

- March 4
  - Parliamentary Elections
    - Only two blocs participate in these elections: the CODE (Confederation of Democracy, an opposition alliance, made up of National Party and Christian Democracy) and the UP (Unidad Popular, made up of the parties that support the government of Salvador Allende). In which the Popular Unity obtained 44.66% of the votes for Deputy, against 54.42% of the opposition alliance; and 46.56% of the votes for Senators, against 48.09% for the opposition alliance.
    - The police arrested five far-right terrorists with 1,800 sticks of dynamite.
- March 9 - The armed forces stationed in the Valparaíso Province received a quartering order as a result of paramilitary organized MIR and FTR groups taking over areas and roads adjacent to the Armored Cavalry Regiment No 4 «Coraceros».
- March 11–2 people injured and numerous damage left behind by an attack with explosives perpetrated by left-wing extremists in front of the headquarters of the Christian Democratic Party in Valparaíso.
- March 12 – Two buses from the Flecha Norte company collide head-on on the route that connects Calama with Antofagasta in the north of the country in front of the Salinas station. 36 people die and 77 people are injured, being, so far, the traffic accident with the highest number of fatalities in the history of the country.
- March 16 – Young Christian Democrats Sergio Óscar Vergara and Germán Enrique González Menares, 16 and 17 years old respectively, are shot by terrorists in a plot located in the queen's commune.
- March 19 - The 35-year-old painter Jorge Tomás Henríquez González is assassinated by members of Fatherland and Liberty while trying to steal the equipment used to interfere with the signal of Channel 5 in Concepción.
- March 25 – An investigation by the United States Congress acknowledged having given 1 million dollars to prevent Allende's assumption as president.
- March 27 – Cabinet change. The new ministers are: Gerardo Espinoza (Socialist Party) in the Interior; Pedro Hidalgo (Socialist Party) in Agriculture; Sergio Bitar (Christian Left) in Mining, Roberto Cuellar (Independent Popular Action) in Lands and Colonization; and Aníbal Palma (Radical Party) in the General Secretariat of the Government.

=== April ===
- April 2 - Gabriel Rodriguez Alcaino, investigation official, is shot to death by members of the MIR in the south of Santiago while checking them to see if they were carrying weapons or explosives.
- The Minister of Economy, Orlando Millas officially communicates that the government is not in a position to rationalize essential items.
- April 11 – The Constitutional Court of Chile indicates that the parliament violated the Constitution by intervening in the salary increase, since it is an exclusive attribution of the executive power.
- April 13 - The ship Sierra Maestra from Cuba arrives at Talcahuano with 11,400 tons of sugar.
- April 14 - Pedro Vuskovic, Vice President of the CORFO was authorized by the government to contract with the Moscow Bank of Commerce an extension of 40 million dollars in recently contracted credits.
- April 19:
  - An indefinite strike begins at the El Teniente copper deposit, which would last 74 days.
  - Unknown armed rebels toppled the Monument to Che Guevarra in Southern Part of Chile.
  - Attempted fire at the premises of the official newspaper Última Hora.
- April 22 – The first gay protest was organised.
- April 24 – Presidential Gardener Carlos Henríquez Cisternas, was assassinated by Willians Ramírez Barría, a member of the GAP (Group of Personal Friends). Later he tried to shoot 2 reporters from Las Últimas Noticias who came to cover the incident.
- April 25 – The government complains against the opposition newspaper El Mercurio.
- April 27 – Massive concentration of adherents of the Popular Unity, in which Allende addresses the protesters.

=== May ===
- May 1 – Patricio Aylwin assumes the presidency of the Christian Democratic Party replacing Renán Fuentealba Moena.
- May 2 :
  - The Soviet Government was awarded the Lenin Peace Prize to Salvador Allende.
  - The leader of Patria y Libertad, Roberto Thieme, requests political asylum in Argentina.
  - Shooting confrontation between far-left militants and the far-right organization Patria y Libertad, in which one of its members is killed.
- May 4 :
  - Papelera is announced to be nationalized by the Government. This generates an energetic reaction from the opposition to said measure, starting a campaign to prevent the transfer of the factory to the State, whose emblem was "La Papelera NO".
  - Shooting confrontation between adherents of the National Party and Popular Unity, which ended with 1 dead and 3 wounded.
- May 5 – A state of emergency is declared in the Province of Santiago.
- May 7 – In Concepción the newspaper El Cóndor is attacked by members of Patria y Libertad, who also kidnapped and tortured three young communists.
- May 8 - Members of Patria y Libertad assassinate 22-year-old communist worker José Ricardo Ahumada Vásquez in front of the Christian Democracy headquarters.
- May 10 – A state of emergency is decreed in the Province of O'Higgins, due to the El Teniente strike.
- May 14 – Several premises of Patria y Libertad are raided, finding numerous weapons and explosives, after the call of its leader Roberto Thieme (from Argentina) to unleash a civil war.
- The Popular Unity government warned the Comptroller that he could be constitutionally accused
- May 17 – Meetings of Patria y Libertad are prohibited.
- May 18 - President Salvador Allende announced the expropriation of certain foreign companies.
- May 21 – President Salvador Allende makes his annual speech in Congress where for the first time he was blundered by parliamentarians and declared "Using the law first, I will use revolutionary violence later if necessary.".
- May 23 – One dead and two seriously injured leaves an attack with heavy fire towards strikers when they passed the headquarters of the Socialist Party of Rancagua.
- May 24- Army Lieutenant Colonel C.Ackarcreek was relieved of his functions as head of the emergency zone of the Province of O'higgins when he ordered the search of the headquarters of the Socialist Party in Rancagua.
- May 27 :
  - 48-hour strike carried out by the Chilean Medical College against the Allende government.

National Day of Voluntary Work, whose motto was Chile works for Chile, in which more than 3 million people participate in support of the government.

- May 30 –Dynamite attack on a television tower of Televisión Nacional de Chile in which one person is killed.
- May 31 :
  - Official visit of the President of Cuba, Osvaldo Dorticós Torrado.
  - Attack on the headquarters of the Communist Party and on Radio Corporación, by militants from Patria y Libertad.
  - Radio Agricultura is closed for six days.
  - Confrontation between miners from El Teniente and the Carabineros, a miner is killed.

=== June ===
- June 1 - Patria y Libertad attacks the headquarters of the Socialist and Radical Party while in Valparaíso Pablo Rodriguez Grez is arrested.
- June 3 - Chile suspends shipments of copper abroad.
- June 10 - The Chamber of Deputies suspends the Ministers of Mining and Labor, Sergio Bitar and Luis Figueroa.
- eight radio stations are fined for not joining the national Radio and TV network.
- The Nigerian ship Napier runs aground on Guamblín Island, spilling around 30,000 tons of Oil into the sea.
- June 15 - Violent confrontations between miners from El Teniente in Santiago, end with the death of the worker Milton Da Silva, in addition to 64 wounded and more than 100 detainees.
- June 17 - After the takeover of channel 9 in January, the University of Chile creates a new signal, Channel 6, the latter frequency being considered illegal by the government.
- June 19 - Channel 6 facilities are raided by the Chilean Investigative Police. On the occasion, members of the Ramona Parra Brigade and the MIR participated, destroying the equipment with the authorization of the Mayor of Santiago and a member of the Popular Unity, Julio Stuardo. Subsequently, a shootout took place between the Ramona Parra Brigade and Los Cerrillos airport personnel.
- June 21 - Attack on the embassies of the Soviet Union and Cuba, and on the headquarters of the Communist Party.
- The Courts of Justice suspended El Mercurio for 6 days for inciting subversion, by exhorting the population not to comply with the government's mandate.
- June 25 - A march of the wives of the miners of El Teniente takes place.
- June 27 - On the Costanera de Santiago, an incident occurs involving General Carlos Prats, Minister of the Interior. According to him, he was intercepted and attacked by opponents of the Unidad Popular who were traveling in a renoleta and he defended himself by firing 2 shots at the tire of the car driven by a woman, one missed and the other hit the fender of the vehicle. Different is the version of numerous witnesses and especially the woman, Alejandrina Cox, who recounts having stuck her tongue out at the General when she recognized him, which provoked his reaction by intercepting her, getting out of his vehicle with the weapon, threatening her with it and demanding rudeness. to apologize to him. There is no precedent to corroborate the version of the uniformed officer as to whether there were others involved or an initial attack against him, but a riot is generated that tries to attack the General, attacking his car, who is helped by a taxi driver. That same afternoon, Prats presented his resignation from the Cabinet to the President of the Republic, but Allende rejected it.
- June 29 - The Tanquetazo takes place Lieutenant Colonel Roberto Souper, commander of the Armored Regiment No. 2, leads an attempted coup that is quickly repelled.
- June 30 - Pablo Rodríguez and other militants of Patria y Libertad seek asylum in the embassy of Ecuador, admitting their participation in the attempted coup.

=== July ===
- July 2 - The Chamber of Deputies rejects the government project to implement the state of siege for a period of 3 months.
- July 3 - After 74 days the El Teniente strike ends.
- July 5 - The Senate dismisses the economy minister, Orlando Millas, while President Salvador Allende unveiled the new emergency economic plan, which leads him to make a new cabinet change.
- July 8 - When a CORA van driven by socialist militants overturns, a list of people to whom machine guns and pistols should be delivered is discovered, as well as 150 small arms, 150 hand grenades, 300 Molotov cocktails and 6 machine guns. of Czechoslovak origin.
- July 15 - Extremists place two bombs in the residence of Ismael Huerta Diaz in Viña del Mar, the first exploded while the second was deactivated.
- July 16 - Inflation reaches 300%.
- July 17 - The MIR places mural posters throughout Santiago inciting the subversion of the military order.
- July 18 - 3 members of the GAP crash a Jeep revealing 3 submachine guns and 3 automatic pistols.
- July 22 - President Salvador Allende attends the funeral of liberal politician Eduardo Alessandri.
- July 25 - An indefinite strike of the Confederation of Truck Owners of Chile begins.
- July 26 - Patria y libertad assassinates Arturo Araya, Allende's naval aide in his home after a dinner with the president in commemoration of the 20th anniversary of the Assault on the Moncada Barracks.

=== August ===
- August 2 - Stoppage of the collective locomotion of Santiago.
- August 5 - The population leader Osvaldo Romo publicly confronts the president Salvador Allende and describes him as Yellow
- August 6 - The communist peasant Juan Marina Sanchez murders the agricultural worker Daniel Briones in the San Mauricio farm in San Fernando.
- August 7 - The Navy declares having discovered an attempt at political infiltration in its ranks with ramifications in the Squadron, in the Second Naval Zone and in the industrial plant of ASMAR Talcahuano. It condemns the attempt to break discipline and states that it will be inflexible in punishing those responsible.
- Marxist terrorists stoned the peasant Raquel Toledo to death when she was on top of a truck going from San Fernando to Santa Cruz
- August 9 - The new government cabinet made up of military *officers is sworn in.
- August 10 - The air force issues a statement warning that extremists dressed in armed forces uniforms have been discovered in different parts of the country.
- August 14 - An opposition march is harshly repressed by carabineros in front of the Plaza de la Constitucion in Santiago.
- August 18-: The Minister of Public Works, General César Ruiz, resigns from his position, as well as from the Commander-in-Chief of the Air Force.
- August 21 - President Salvador Allende appoints General Gustavo Leigh as Ruiz's successor in the Air Force.
- 300 wives of active duty officers came to the house of General Carlos Prats.
- August 22- The Chamber of Deputies approves a text that denounces a serious violation of the Constitutional and legal Order of the Republic by the Government of Allende declaring the latter as Unconstitutional.
- August 23 - General Augusto Pinochet is appointed Commander-in-Chief of the Army due to the resignation of Carlos Prats.
- August 24 - Those detained as a result of the Talcahuano Second Naval Zone plot confessed that Oscar Garreton, Carlos Altamirano and Miguel Enríquez had urged them to bomb the Las Salinas town of Valparaíso.
- August 28 - The Comptroller General of the Republic informs the National Congress that 564 foreigners were hired by the government in public administration.
- General strike of the unions.
- The military leave the ministerial cabinet.
- August 29 - Army Second Lieutenant Hector Lacrampette Calderon is assassinated by Mexican Marxist activist Jorge-Albino Sosa Gil
- August 30 - Rear Admiral Mr. José Toribio Merino, in his capacity as Naval Judge, files a motion for impeachment against Senator Carlos Altamirano and Deputy Oscar Garretón for their responsibility in an alleged attempt uprising in the Navy.

=== September ===
- September 3 - The Single Confederation of Professionals of Chile decrees an indefinite strike, to which university students, other unions and various social movements opposed to Allende adhere.
- September 6-Salvador Allende makes a transcendental speech in which he declares "There is only flour for three or four more days"
- September 7 - Salvador Allende requests the relocation of Synco's Operations Room, from its original location in Providencia to La Moneda Palace
- Military troops from Temuco discovered a new communist guerrilla camp in Mamuil Malal Pass in the Araucania Region with 13 detainees
- September 9 - The University of Chile recovers Channel 9, which had been in the hands of a violent group since June.
- The latest edition of the political debate program, At this time it is improvised, is broadcast on the screens of Channel 13.
- The high command of the Armed Forces sign the act with which they set September 11 as the date of the Coup d'état.
- September 11 - Military Coup: The 3 branches of the Armed Forces, plus Carabineros de Chile, carry out a coup d'état to overthrow President Salvador Allende, who refuses to resign, leading to a series of clashes between military coup leaders and members of the GAP, the presidential armed escort. The Palacio de La Moneda is bombed by Hawker-Hunter planes, causing a fire in the government house. The President's house, located in a residential area of Santiago de Chile, where the first lady was no longer present, was also bombed. In La Moneda, Salvador Allende committed suicide with his rifle AK-47
- At 6:00 p.m. (local time) the Governing Board, headed by General Augusto Pinochet, who would eventually become the leader of the military dictatorship that would govern the country until March 11 of 1990.
- The Governing Board orders the closure of several newspapers and magazines in the country after the coup. Among the newspapers that close their publication are: El Siglo, Clarín, Puro Chile, Las Noticias de Última Hora and the official La Nación (which would only reappear in 1980). Some of the magazines that stopped circulating were: Ahora, Ramona, Punto Final, Mayoria, Paloma, Hechos Mundiales, and Onda. Likewise, the news agencies Prensa Latina (Cuban) and CTK (Czechoslovak) are closed.
- TVN and Channel 9 transmissions are suspended by order of the Military Junta. Only Channel 13 continues its transmissions, using the network of repeaters of TVN, with which it broadcasts at a national level for the first time.
- Thousands of Chilean members, collaborators, adherents and sympathizers of the Popular Unity are detained throughout the country.
- September 12 - The first ministerial cabinet of the military dictatorship is sworn in, which included only 4 civilians (in the portfolios of Education, Justice, Agriculture, and Land and Colonization).
- The Estadio Nacional begins to be used as a detention and torture center, about 40,000 prisoners would pass through it.
- September 13 - The restart of the publications of the newspapers El Mercurio (plus its local newspapers) and La Tercera is authorized. The arrests of peasant and worker leaders begin in the area of Laja and San Rosendo.
- September 14 - After repeated torture, the Chilean singer-songwriter Víctor Jara is assassinated by soldiers of the Army, in the detention center organized in the Estadio Chile.
- The first appeal for amparo since the coup d'état filed by the Christian Democrat Bernardo Leighton in favor of the Ministers of State: Carlos Briones, Clodomiro Almeyda, Jorge Tapia, among others, who were deprived of their liberty by the Armed Forces. The appeal was rejected the same day.
- The Military Junta announces Plan Z
- September 15 - National Television of Chile resumes its transmissions. Since the 11th, the TVN signal had been occupied by Channel 13, by order of the Military Junta.
- September 16 - The former Commander in Chief of the Army, Carlos Prats goes into exile in Argentina.
- September 17 - In Osorno, 13 adherents to the Popular Unity are arrested and executed on the Pimalquén river bridge. Only one person survives, the councilor of Entre Lagos and former mayor Blanca Valderas.
- September 18 - The Archbishop of Santiago Raúl Silva Henríquez performs the traditional Te deum of national holidays where General Augusto Pinochet and former presidents Jorge Alessandri, Gabriel González Videla participate. and Eduardo Frei Montalva.
- Decree Law No. 1, known as "Act of Constitution of the Governing Board", is published in the Official Gazette of the Republic of Chile.
- September 19 - The Spanish priest Joan Alsina is shot at the Internado Nacional Barros Arana.
- September 21 - The Governing Board dissolves the National Congress.
- September 23 - The communist poet Pablo Neruda dies at the age of 69 from Prostate Cancer at the Santa Maria Clinic in Providencia.
- September 28 - at the headquarters of the ITT Inc. company in New York City, a bomb attack takes place in protest of the company's involvement in the September 11 coup d'état.
- September 29 - Rear Admiral Hugo Castro Jiménez assumes as Minister of Education.

=== October ===
- October 5 - The Caravan of Death takes place.
- October 6 - The Catholic, Jewish, Methodist, Evangelical, Lutheran and Pentecostal churches found the Cooperation for Peace Committee, which helps in cases related to human rights.
- October 11 - The newspaper La Patria is founded, which replaces La Nación.
- October 18 - The US Embassy in Chile reports the arrest of Cabro Carrera, among other people, to the DEA.
- October 20-The Legal Medical Service delivers the body of American journalist Charles Horman to his father, Ed Horman. It is presumed that the journalist was shot on September 17 at the Estadio Nacional.

=== November ===
- November 3 - The Catamarca Earthquake could be felt in the cities of Antofagasta, Chañaral, Copiapó and Vallenar.
- November 16 - Decree Law No. 128 is published in the Official Gazette of the Republic of Chile, which clarifies the meaning and scope of article 1 of DL No. 1
- November 19 -The Salta Earthquake could be felt in the cities of Tocopilla, Calama Antofagasta and Chañaral.

=== December ===
- December 8 - The Atacama Regional Museum is inaugurated in Copiapó.
- December 31 - Decree Law No. 231 abolishes the fractions of the shield.

=== Unknown Dates ===
- March – President Allende announced at the beginning of March that a new educational plan, called the Unified National School (ENU), will be launched and that it would have the objective of concentrating all education in the hands of the State, which would impose programs.

== Births ==
- February 14 – Sebastián Keitel
- March 12 – Pablo Illanes
- May 9 – Francisca Merino
- June 12 – Marco Enríquez-Ominami
- October 16 – María Eugenia Larraín
- December 12 – Rodrigo Peñailillo

== Deaths ==
- September 11 – Salvador Allende, President (b. 1908)
- September 15 – Víctor Jara, singer-songwriter (b. 1932)
- September 19 – Charles Horman, American journalist documentary filmmaker (b. 1942)
- September 24 – Arnoldo Camu
- October 1 – Carlos Schneeberger (b. 1902)
- October 3 – José Gregorio Liendo (b. 1945)
- October 13 – Carlos Fariña
