= 1906 in Chile =

- Decades: 1880s; 1890s; 1900s; 1910s; 1920s
- See also: Other events of 1906; Timeline of Chilean history

The following lists events that happened during 1906 in Chile.

== Incumbents ==
- President of Chile: Germán Riesco (until September 18), Pedro Montt

== Events ==
- 25 June – Chilean presidential election, 1906
- 16 August – 1906 Valparaíso earthquake
- 4 September – The Order of Merit (Chile) is created.

== Births ==
- date unknown – Juan Zanelli (d. 1944)
- 10 October – Olga Maturana (d. 1973)
- 20 October – Arturo Torres Carrasco (d. 1987)
