= 1903 in Chile =

- Decades: 1880s; 1890s; 1900s; 1910s; 1920s
- See also: Other events of 1903; Timeline of Chilean history

The following lists events that happened during 1903 in Chile.

== Incumbents ==
- President of Chile: Germán Riesco

== Events ==
- 3 June – The Club Deportivo Arturo Fernández Vial is founded.

== Births ==
- date unknown – Magdalena Petit (d. 1968)
- date unknown – Esteban Serrador (d. 1978)
- 6 February – Claudio Arrau, pianist (d. 1991)
- 25 February – Guillermo Subiabre (d. 1964)
- 5 November – Guillermo Saavedra (footballer) (d. 1957)

== Deaths ==
- 14 July – Manuel Antonio Caro (b. 1835)
