= Saffy =

Saffy or Safy may refer to:

== People ==
- Safy Boutella (born 1950), Algerian musician, arranger, composer, and record producer
- Safy Nebbou (born 1968), French actor and director
- Yue Safy (born 2000), Cambodian footballer
- Alex Saffy (born 2005), Australian swimmer
- Jarrod Saffy (born 1984), South African rugby union player

== Fictional characters ==
- Saffy Monsoon, a character in the British sitcom Absolutely Fabulous
- the protagonist of the children's novel Saffy's Angel

== See also ==
- Hamdy El-Safy (born 1972), Egyptian former volleyball player
- Saffi (disambiguation), also includes Saffie
