= 1911 in Chile =

- Decades: 1890s; 1900s; 1910s; 1920s; 1930s
- See also: Other events of 1911; Timeline of Chilean history

The following lists events that happened during 1911 in Chile.

== Incumbents ==
- President of Chile: Ramón Barros Luco

== Events ==
=== May ===
- 2 May – The Chilean National History Museum is founded.

== Births ==
- 16 January – Eduardo Frei Montalva, politician (died 1982)
- 11 February – Juana Muller, sculptor (died 1952)
- 11 June – Pedro Olmos Muñoz, painter and illustrator (died 1991)
- 11 November – Roberto Matta, painter (died 2002)

== Deaths ==
- July 29 – Joaquín Villarino, teacher (born 1832)
