= 1913 in Chile =

- Decades: 1890s; 1900s; 1910s; 1920s; 1930s
- See also: Other events of 1913; Timeline of Chilean history

The following lists events that happened during 1913 in Chile.

== Incumbents ==
- President of Chile: Ramón Barros Luco

== Events ==
=== May ===
- 25 May – The Deportes Santa Cruz football club is founded.

=== November ===
- 27 November – South American dreadnought race: The Chilean battleship Almirante Latorre is launched.

== Births ==
- 16 February – Raúl Sáez (d. 1992)
- 4 April – Braulio Arenas (d. 1988)
- 3 August – Ignacio Cruzat (d. 1977)
- 23 August – Rodrigo Flores (d. 2007)
- 25 September – Carlos Muñoz Pizarro (d. 1976)
- 27 October – Jorge Guerra (d. 2003)
- 31 December – René Schneider (d. 1970)

== Deaths ==
- 9 February – José Antonio Gandarillas (b. 1839)
