= 1910 in Chile =

- Decades: 1890s; 1900s; 1910s; 1920s; 1930s
- See also: Other events of 1910; Timeline of Chilean history

The following lists events that happened during 1910 in Chile.

== Incumbents ==
- President of Chile: Pedro Montt Montt (until 16 August), Elías Fernández Albano (until 6 September), Emiliano Figueroa Larraín (until 23 December), Ramón Barros Luco

== Events ==
- 15 October – Chilean presidential election, 1910

== Births ==
- 22 February – Stewart Iglehart (d. 1993)

== Deaths ==
- 24 June – Juan Williams Rebolledo (b. 1825)
- 16 August – Pedro Montt Montt (b. 1846)
- 6 September – Elías Fernández Albano (b. 1845)
