= 1902 in Chile =

- Decades: 1880s; 1890s; 1900s; 1910s; 1920s
- See also: Other events of 1902; Timeline of Chilean history

The following lists events that happened during 1902 in Chile.

== Incumbents ==
- President of Chile: Germán Riesco

== Events ==
- 28 May – The Pacts of May are signed.
- 20 November – The Cordillera of the Andes Boundary Case 1902 (Argentina, Chile) is settled.

== Births ==
- 2 February – Roberto Cortés (d. 1975)
- 10 February – Guillermo Riveros (d. 1959)
- 24 February – Carlos Vidal (d. 1982)
- 28 February – Marcela Paz (d. 1985)
- 21 June – Carlos Schneeberger (d. 1973)
- 12 July – Bernardo Ibáñez (d. 1983)
- 29 July – David Arellano (d. 1902)
- 6 October – Roberto Müller

== Deaths ==
- 1 February – Aníbal Zañartu (b. 1847)
- 26 July – Recaredo Santos Tornero (b. 1842)
