= 1909 in Chile =

- Decades: 1880s; 1890s; 1900s; 1910s; 1920s
- See also: Other events of 1909; Timeline of Chilean history

The following lists events that happened during 1909 in the Republic of Chile.

== Incumbents ==
- President of Chile: Pedro Montt

== Events ==
- 24 June – The Everton de Viña del Mar football club is founded.

== Births ==
- 15 May – Clara Solovera (d. 1992)
- 16 May – Raúl Rettig (d. 2000)
- 16 August – Bernardo Leighton (d. 1995)
- 24 October – Óscar Izurieta Molina (d. 1990)

== Deaths ==
- 4 January – Pedro Pablo Figueroa (b. 1857)
- 23 March – José Alfonso Cavada
