= 1914 in Chile =

- Decades: 1890s; 1900s; 1910s; 1920s; 1930s
- See also: Other events of 1914; Timeline of Chilean history

The following lists events that happened during 1914 in Chile.

== Incumbents ==
- President of Chile: Ramón Barros Luco

== Events ==
=== March ===
- 29 March – Mana Expedition to Easter Island

=== May ===
- 8 May – The Con Con National football club is founded.

=== November ===
- 1 November – World War I: Battle of Coronel

== Births ==
- 7 May – Radomiro Tomic (d. 1992)
- 11 May – Arturo Bucciardi (d. 1970)
- 5 September – Nicanor Parra (d. 2018)
- 8 November – Juan Acevedo Pavez (d. 2010)

== Deaths ==
- 9 March – Alejandro Bello (b. 1887)
