= Cautín Agrarian Revolt =

The 1971 Cautín Agrarian Revolt was started by the Chilean peasants whose starvation was so severe that their extinction appeared imminent.

This led to the peasantry seizing the Tres Hijuelas farm. Mapuche families from the neighboring Reducción Alhueco quietly threaded their way across the wheat fields of Cautín Province in southern Chile to pitch crude tents of wheat sacks and old blankets under a hillside cluster of eucalyptus trees on the farm with which they had a boundary dispute lasting many years. The Mapuches posted guards at the deserted clapboard farmhouse of the Fundo Tres Hijuelas-the Owner, Carlos Taladriz, lived in the neighboring town of Lautaro and was away in Santiago at the time-as well as at the machine shed, at the roadside entrance to the farm and at the bridge of planks that crossed over a small stream to the house. The only persons living on the 1,250-acre (5.1 km^{2}) farm at the time were a shepherd and a tractor driver.

The Mapuches, following what seemed to be a carefully prepared course of actions, decorated the house around the farm's main facility with red and black banners of the Castroite MIR (Movement of the Revolutionary Left) and of its peasant affiliate, Movimiento Campesino Revolucionario (MCR). On the next morning the provincial newspaper, El Diario Austral, printed a front-page photograph of the Mapuches, armed with thin short sticks and pitchforks, gathered at the entrance to the farm, which had been barred with poles that came from tall trees that bore a glowering portrait of Che Guevara. Above their heads a large banner was tied to the gateposts that read: CAPAMENTO LAUTARO. TIERRA O MUERTE. VENCEREMOS. MOVIMIENTO CAMPESINO REVOLUCIONARIO. The newspaper reported "total intransigence" on the part of the Indians, who claimed that the lands were stolen from their community in the past and insisted upon remaining on the farm until it was repossessed by the Agrarian Reform Corporation (CORA).

This is significant because in 1971 and 1972 some 120 farms were repossessed in this manner. Also it shows the desperate need that Chile was in which is why in 1970 to 1973 they attempted to repair the economy with Marxism. One of the major factors in the extreme poverty in Chile was because while the production of food per acre increased 20%, the population increased by nearly 80%. The rural poor was forced to feed the 76% urban population. However, whatever comfort the Marxist government could offer was quickly withdrawn as less than three years later, in 1973 a dictatorship government was installed.
