= Gualliguaica rail accident =

1971 railway incident in Chile

Details
- Date: March 11, 1971
- Location: near Vicuña, Elqui Province
- Country: Chile
- Line: La Serena to Rivadavia
- Operator: EFE
- Incident type: derailment

Statistics
- Trains: 1
- Passengers: 350
- Deaths: 12

The Gualliguaica rail accident happened on March 11, 1971, near Vicuña, Chile, when a runaway train packed with children derailed next to a ravine killing twelve. It was caused by failure to keep brakes applied during station stops.

== Accident ==
The train was transporting schoolchildren on a day trip from La Serena to Vicuña to visit the Gabriela Mistral museum. The journey to Vicuna had proceeded without incident. After lunch the diesel locomotive ran around the train for the return trip as the children took their places in the five-car train. The train crew were in the stationmaster's office, finalising details of the return trip when the train started to move off. Those aboard the train thought nothing was amiss but there was no-one manning the locomotive. When the rail staff realised what was happening they unsuccessfully attempted to board the train in motion but being on a slope it quickly accelerated away from the station. Eight miles down the line at Cuesta de Gualliguaica the line makes a sharp bend next to the Elqui River. At this point the train derailed plunging into the ravine.

President Salvador Allende was flown to the scene of the tragedy in an Air Force plane and demanded that those responsible for the accident be punished.

== Causes ==
The enquiry into the accident observed that ideally all stations should be built such that no gradient exists on the lines passing through them; but the mountainous terrain in the area had made this impossible in the case of Vicuña. It also stated that the brakes on the train were of the Westinghouse design so should be fail-safe although the locomotive had been running at idle at the time and a fault in the system may have gone unnoticed. The report also highlighted that against the regulations it had become common practice not to keep the brakes applied when trains were waiting for long periods at the station.

Press reports at the time stated that a six-year boy had got into the cab of the locomotive and accidentally released the brakes.

The site of the accident is now beneath the surface of the Tranque Puclaro, a reservoir created in 1999.
