= Cuban packages =

Chilean smuggling scandal

The Cuban packages (1972) was a Chilean conspiracy theory involving President Salvador Allende, his Minister of the Interior, Hernán del Canto and the Director of the Civil Police Eduardo Paredes. It was cited by the authors of the Chamber of Deputies' Declaration of the Breakdown of Chile’s Democracy as one of the instances of government officials' illegality.

The packages turned out to have contained automatic weapons, grenades and ammunition destined to form a small "revolutionary" army in Chile. These specific packages were part of an ongoing smuggling of weapons from Cuba that were delivered regularly twice a week via Cubana de Aviación, hidden inside the diplomatic pouches.

== History ==
The regular flight of Cubana de Aviación arrived normally to Pudahuel Airport on the afternoon of March 11, 1972.

Nonetheless, as soon as the airplane touched ground, a caravan of cars and police patrols entered the runway and surrounded the plane. From the cargo hold they removed 11 big and heavy packages that were loaded onto the cars and sped away. Customs officials stopped the cars and insisted in processing the packages before they could be removed from the airport perimeter. Eduardo Paredes, director of the civil police, who had arrived from Cuba in the same plane (and who claimed the packages as his personal cargo) refused the officials' request for access and ordered them to withdraw. When the customs officers in turn refused to allow them to proceed, they received a personal call from the Interior Minister, Hernán del Canto, who ordered them to let the packages be interned without further ado. The bypassing of customs was organized by Canto and Congress later succeeded to impeach him.

The news leaked immediately into the newspapers. During the following weeks the government, attacked by the press, Congress and the National Comptroller, gave several contradictory excuses about the content of the packages. They said that they were books, food, cigarettes and crafts; later they explained that they were paintings for a Cuban art show that was to be mounted at the National Museum of Art. Even later they mentioned technology for the civil police (to explain the presence of their director at the airport) and even mango ice cream sent by Fidel Castro as a present to Salvador Allende.

Allende in person decided to put an end to the speculations and the political pressure. He declared in a public interview that "...in fact, the flight... that arrived to Pudahuel, transported some gifts that were sent by the Cuban Prime Minister personally to me as well as to other Chilean authorities". Later it was found that the packages contained heavy Cuban weaponry for Allende's militant supporters. At least 3000-4000 AK-47s were delivered this way.

== See also ==
- Carrizal Bajo
- Chilean coup of 1973
- Chilean political scandals
