= Germán Picó Cañas =

Chilean lawyer, businessman and politician (1905–1988)

President of the National Press Association
- In office 1954–1975

Minister of Finance
- In office 15 July 1951 – 29 July 1952
- President: Gabriel González Videla
- Preceded by: Carlos Vial Espantoso
- Succeeded by: Ignacio Lorca

Minister of Finance
- In office 10 January 1947 – 2 August 1947
- President: Gabriel González Videla
- Preceded by: Roberto Wachholtz
- Succeeded by: Jorge Alessandri

Personal details
- Born: 25 May 1905 Santiago, Chile
- Died: 12 July 1988 (aged 83) Santiago, Chile
- Party: Radical Party (until 1969); Radical Democracy (1969–1988); National Renewal (1987–1988)
- Spouse: Concepción Domínguez
- Children: 3
- Education: University of Chile
- Occupation: Lawyer; businessman; politician

Germán Picó Cañas (25 May 1905 – 12 July 1988) was a Chilean lawyer, businessman and politician. A member of the Radical Party (PR) until 1969, he served twice as Minister of Finance under President Gabriel González Videla. He was also the founder of the media company Copesa.

== Early life and education ==
Picó was born in Santiago, Chile, on 25 May 1905. He attended the Instituto Nacional in Santiago and subsequently studied law at the University of Chile, qualifying as a lawyer in 1931.

He married Concepción Domínguez, with whom he had three children, including racing driver Germán Picó Domínguez.

Picó died in Santiago on 12 July 1988.

== Political career ==
Picó joined the Radical Party (PR). During the presidency of Gabriel González Videla, he served as Minister of Finance on two occasions, first for approximately six months in 1947 and again from 1951 to 1952. He also served as executive vice-president of the Corporación de Fomento de la Producción (CORFO) from 1942 to 1946.

On 29 June 1969, Picó was expelled from the Radical Party along with several other members. In November of that year, they founded the Radical Democracy party. The party supported Jorge Alessandri in the 1970 Chilean presidential election.

In 1985, Picó and Sergio Onofre Jarpa were among the founders of the National Labour Front. Two years later, he participated in the founding of National Renewal (RN), subsequently serving as a member of its Political Commission.

== Business career ==
Between his two terms as finance minister, Picó became involved in the newspaper industry. In 1949, at the initiative of President González Videla, he and Raúl Jaras Barros acquired the rights to a controlling block of shares in La Hora, a newspaper closely associated with the PR that was experiencing serious financial difficulties.

Attempts to restore the newspaper's financial position proved unsuccessful; despite the measures adopted, more copies were reportedly being distributed free of charge than were actually sold. Picó and Jaras therefore decided to launch an evening newspaper, La Tercera de la Hora, which first appeared on 7 July 1950.

La Tercera became the foundation of the Consorcio Periodístico de Chile (Copesa). Picó held a 40% stake in the company, while his brother Agustín owned 20% and Raúl Jaras held the remaining 40%. In 1982, Jaras sold his stake to the Picó brothers.

In 1954, Picó was elected president of the National Press Association, a position he held until 1975. In the business sector, he also headed the Association of Metallurgical and Metalworking Industries (Asimet). By the late 1970s, he owned a 15% stake in the Banco de Constitución.
