= Juan Cristóbal Guarello =

Chilean sports journalist

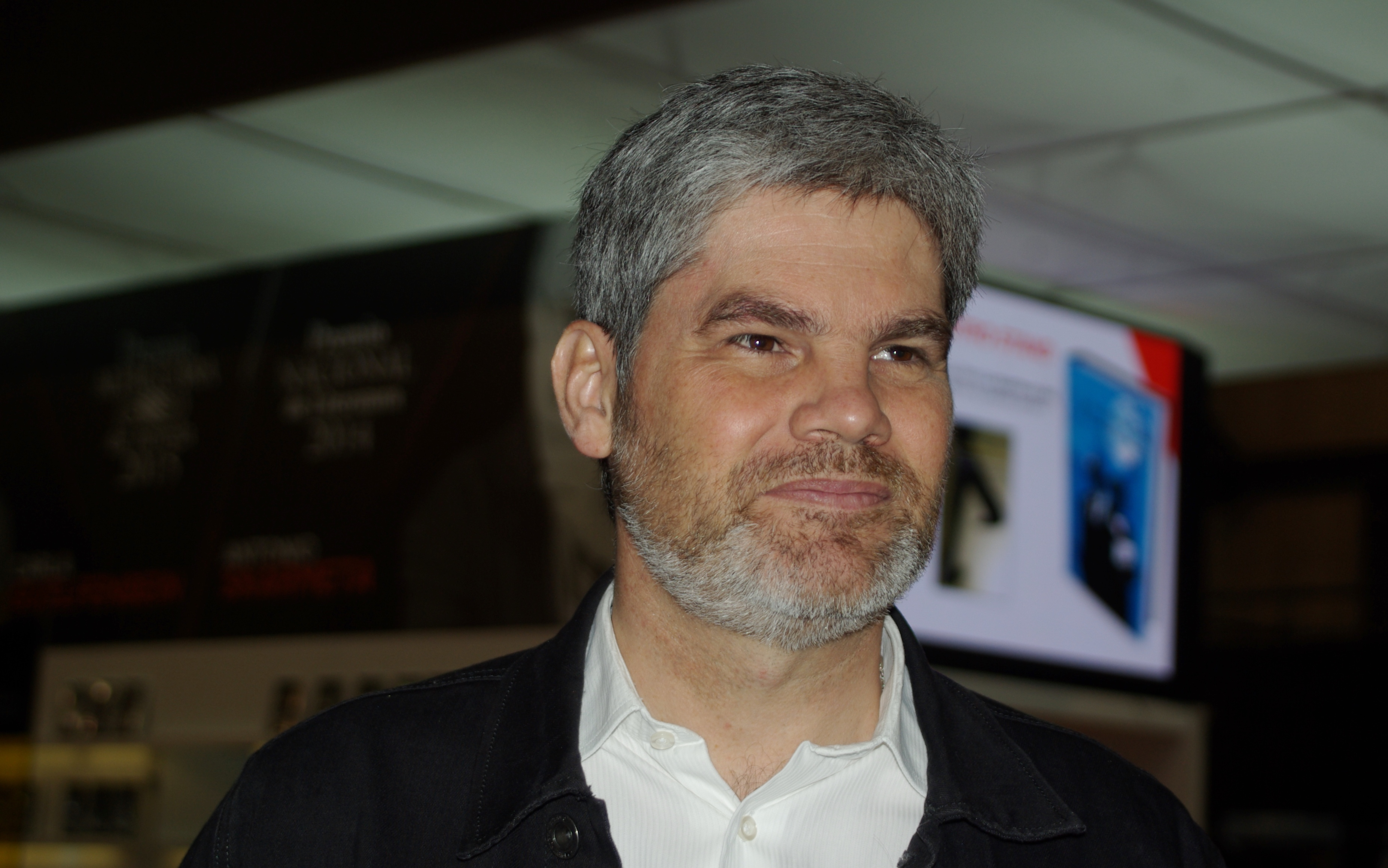
The Chilean journalist Juan Cristóbal Guarello at the International Fair of the Book of Santiago 2015

Juan Cristobal Guarello (born March 15, 1969, in Santiago) is a Chilean sports journalist. He is the son of Fernando Angel Guarello Zegers and María de Toro Serrano. He studied journalism at the Universidad Diego Portales (1988-1994). He did a diploma in film in the Pontifical Catholic University of Chile. He has worked in Chilean sports Channel 2, Rock & Pop, Chilevision, TVN, El Mercurio among other publications. He has also worked for T & C Sports. He is currently the director of the publication El Gráfico (Chile); a sports commentator for Channel 13 and ADN Radio Chile and writes a column for the Publimetro.

== Political views ==
From 1988 to 1994, he was a member of the Communist Party of Chile.

== Books published ==
Juan Cristóbal Guarello has written and published 5 books in which he details the hidden history of Chilean football.

- Anecdotario del fútbol chileno (con Luis Urrutia O'Nell) (2005)
- Historias secretas del fútbol chileno (con Luis Urrutia O'Nell) (2007)
- Historias secretas del fútbol chileno II (con Luis Urrutia O'Nell) (2008)
- Historia de la clasificación Sudáfrica 2010 (con Luis Urrutia O'Nell) (2010)
- Anecdotario del fútbol chileno II (con Luis Urrutia O'Nell) (2011)
