= Monte Águila =

Coordinates: 37.0803°S 72.4399°W

Monte Águila Monteaguila Monte-Águila
- City
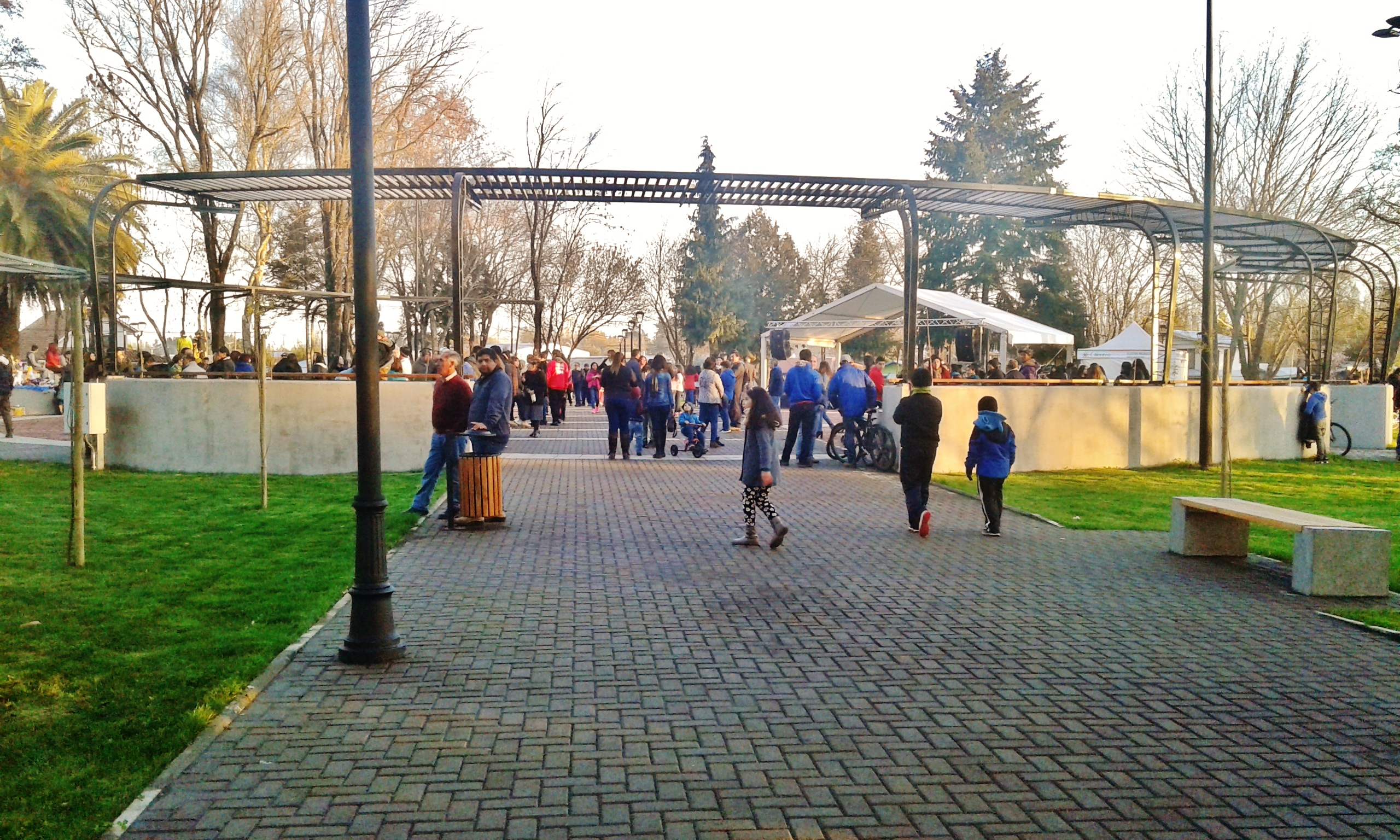
- Monte Águila Main Square
- Location in Chile.
- Country: Chile
- Region: Bío Bío
- Province: Bío Bío
- Commune: Cabrero

Government
  - Type: Town belonging to Cabrero.
  - Mayor of Cabrero: Mario Gierke Quevedo (IND)

Population (2017 Census)
  - Total: 6,574
- Time zone: UTC−4 (CLT)
  - Summer (DST): UTC−3 (CLST)
- Area code: 56 + 43
- Website: www.monteaguila.cl

Monte Águila (lit. transl. Mount Eagle) is a Chilean town in the Bio Bio Region. Its population is 6,574.

== Toponymy ==
According to the aboriginal account of the area that lived in the first half of the twentieth century, the name "Monte Águila" comes from the lonco Ñancomawida, whose name, in Mapudungun, meant "Mount of the Eagles" (in Spanish: Monte de las águilas).

== History ==
=== Origins ===
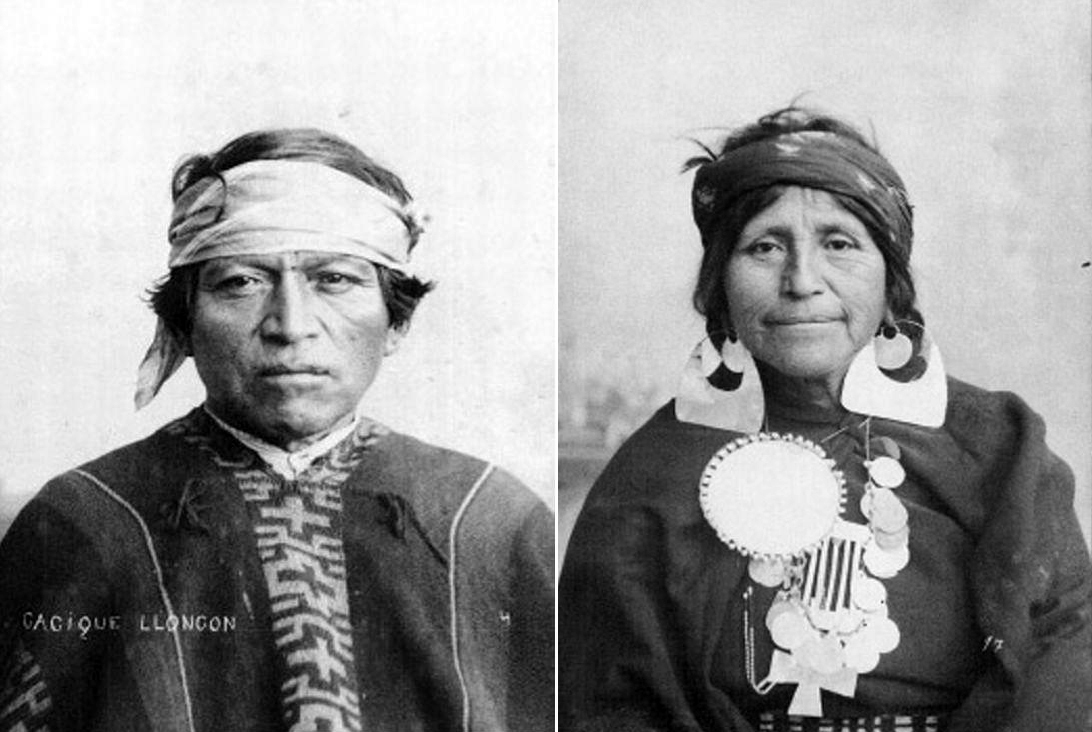
The first inhabitants of Monte Águila were aboriginals of the Mapuche ethnic group, who lived in the area until the end of the 19th century.

The origins of this town cover a space of no more than 150 years, so much so that in his book, the Chilean historian Francisco Astaburuaga makes the first reference to the city, naming it as "Fundo Monte Águila". The history begins with the indigenous Mapuche and Araucanian people settled in the area of Monte Águila, belonging to the district (es:subdelegación) of Yumbel. The first inhabitants of this town were a group of aboriginals of the Mapuche ethnic group, those who lived in the middle of the most sandy and deserted territories, with scarce vegetation, known for their ethnicity as Coyunches (in Mapuche language: People of the sands). These indigenous people were led by the lonco Ñancomawida, who, with their people, were not accepted in the farm that had been developed in the sector, as were the carpenters who worked there.

In 1852, this group of natives, was forced to leave the area as a result of legislation introduced by the government of Manuel Montt. This enabled the area to be colonized by German immigrants, led by Hans Frank and Martin Worman. There were several Mapuche uprisings, with the purpose of recovering their territories, with the purpose of recovering the stolen lands, from 1880 to 1882, and that is why Ñancomawida and its people were integrated into the progressive process of alienation of the land, in retaliation for the abuses and scarce committed by the new inhabitants. Later, the leader of that group of indigenous people, Ñancomawida, disappears, without knowing more about him.

=== Second half of the 19th century ===
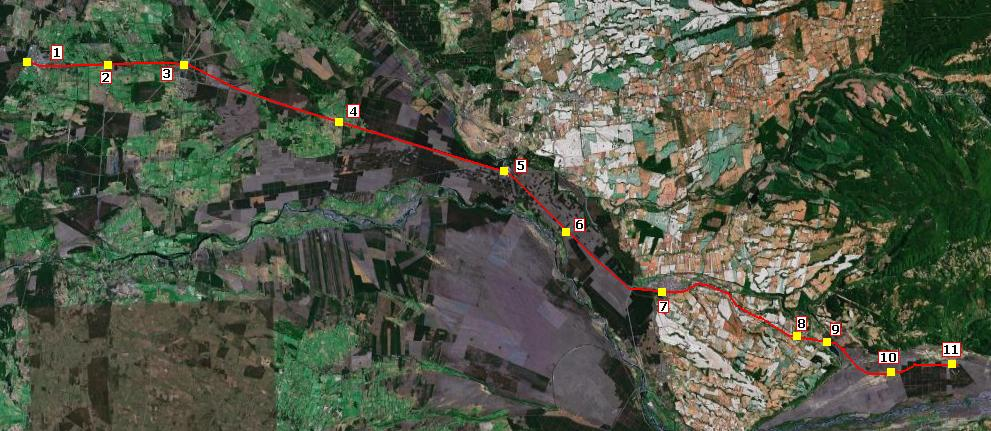
Itinerary of the disappeared Monte Águila-Polcura branch.

An important event in the development of Monte Águila was the construction of the state railway in 1864. After the War of the Pacific (1880), the town served as a transport hub from which weapons and future soldiers were transported in carts and rail cars. In 1887, a trade link was established between Monte Águila and the Argentine city of Neuquén, which lasted until 1968, a period in which Monte Águila saw much economic and social development. Also important to the growth of Monte Águila as a city was the construction of the branch line between it and the Polcura River. The trans-Andean railway, whose construction began in 1905, was funded by Porfirio Ahumada, a Chilean national, and his partners Corsini, Carlos Viel (engineer), Martin Worman and Horacio del Río. This was a key event in the formation of Monte Águila, enabling the city to come together and achieve rapid growth, bringing with it social and cultural development.

=== 20th century ===
As of 1979, the entire area located west of Río Claro passes to the administration of the Yumbel Commune, while the towns of Monte Águila, Charrúa, Chillancito and Salto del Laja are integrated into the commune of Cabrero, thus structuring the communicate as it is known today.

=== 21st century ===
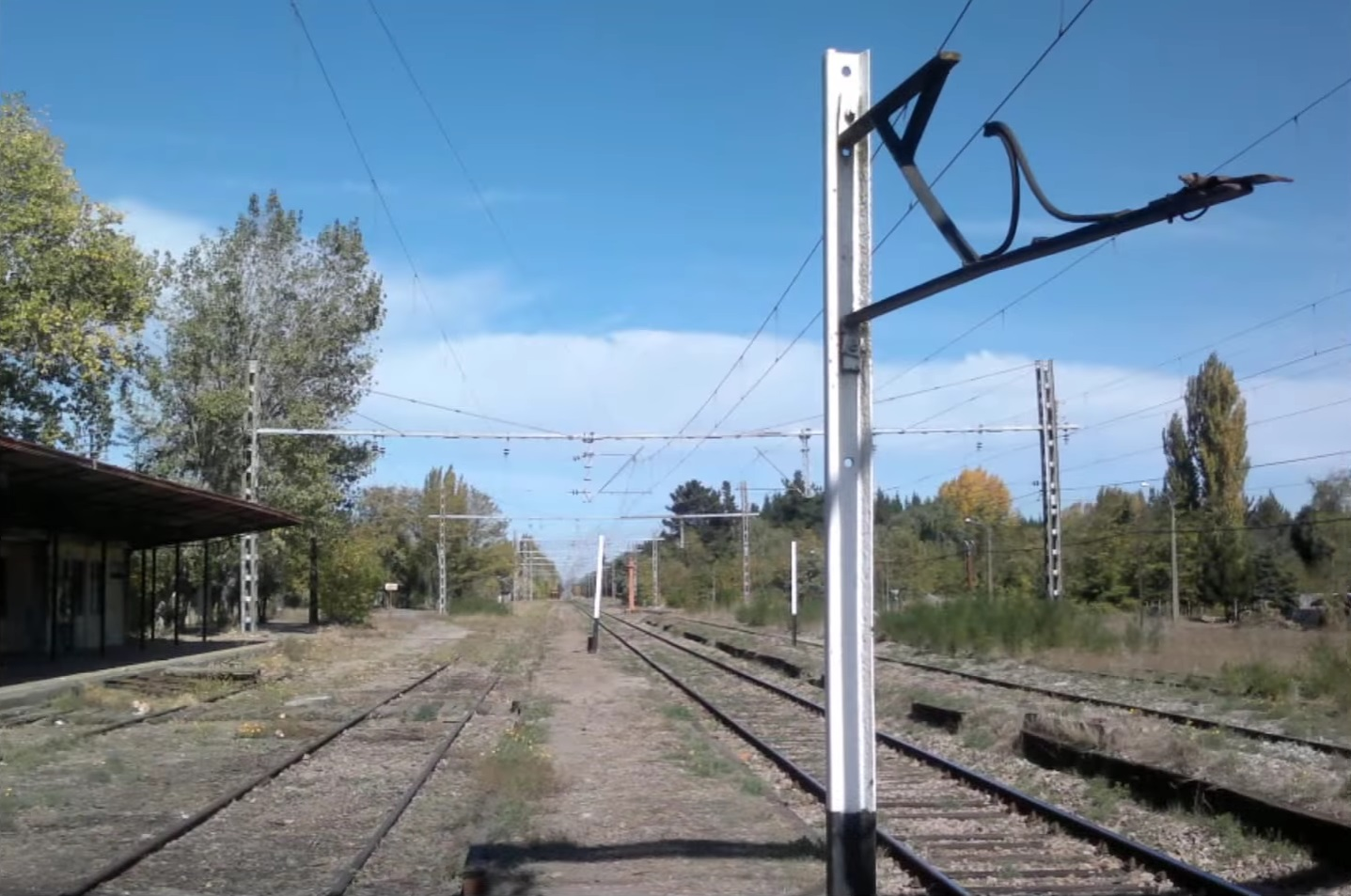
Monte Águila railway station.

Monte Águila is currently a growing city. In 2002 its population reached 6,090 inhabitants. A large part of the people who live in this town work as a farmer, or work in certain jobs in nearby cities, especially Los Angeles and Concepción, regional capital. At present, the railway industry is in disuse, and much of its structures have been abandoned, this because they are owned by Empresa de los Ferrocarriles del Estado, which prohibits the Municipality of Cabrero or any private entity from taking over these structures. Recently it has been used as a concert stage, and as a mini playground for children. The city has built new businesses and places of recreation, being one of the most remarkable remodeling of the main square of the city.

== Geography ==
The city is located in the Intermediate Depression, 19.67 km (12 mi) from the Ñuble-Biobío regional boundary. The altitude of the town is 115 m a.s.l.

The town has a Mediterranean climate, with very marked seasons and dry and rainy periods of similar duration.

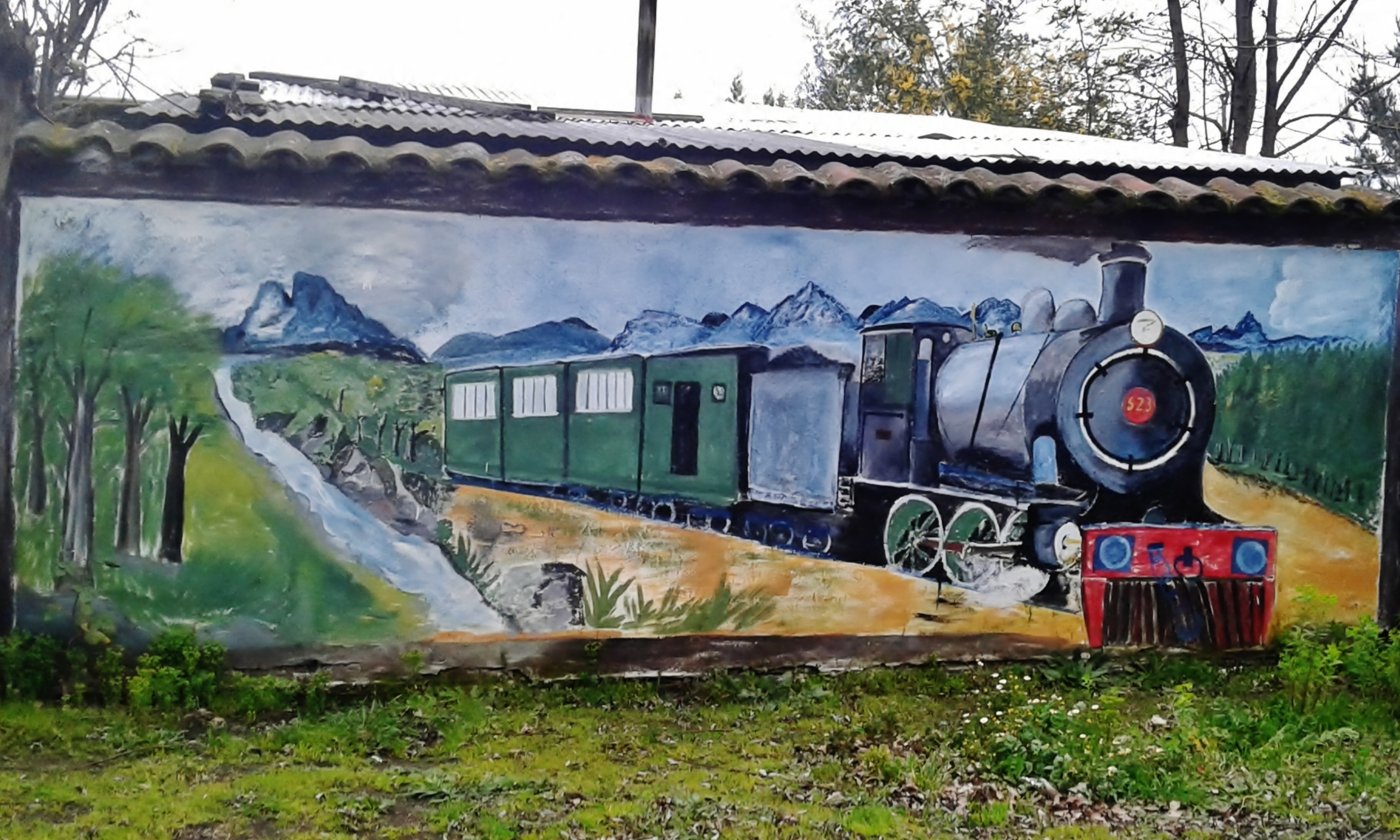
Former representation of the train, made by the local artist Raúl Caces Torres.

== Demography ==
The historian Tito Figueroa argues that from the 1907 census, an official demographic statistic can be obtained for the town, at that time having 91 inhabitants. Undoubtedly, the "Ferrocarril del Sur", the construction of the railroad that connected Monte Águila with the Argentine province of Neuquén and the increase in the productivity of the farms in the area gave life to this urban nucleus. Proof of the above was its rapid population growth, reaching almost a thousand inhabitants in the 30s and doubling 30 years later. According to the 1992 census, at that time it had 5207 inhabitants, and later, according to the 2002 Census, Monte Águila had 6,090 inhabitants.

=== Distribution of population ===
The population of Monte Águila is distributed homogeneously in its territory, divided into villas, highlighting the so-called "11 de septiembre, the most populous in the city. Monte Águila was formed under the principles of the grid plan, starting from the station to the east.

== Religion ==
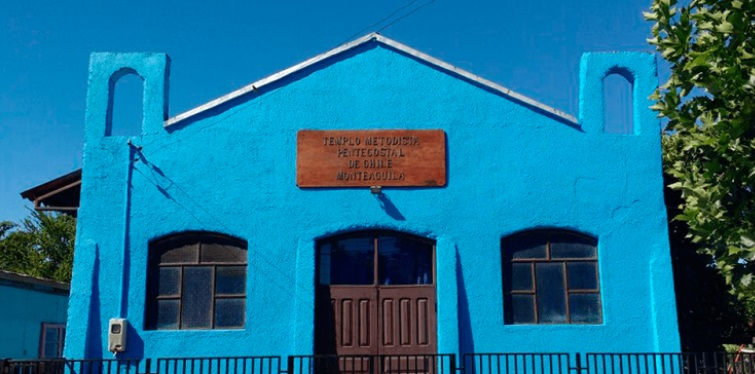
Protestant Christian church in Monte Águila.

These figures have undoubtedly changed during this time, which although it is not verified in figures, if it is corroborable in facts. Today there is a Catholic church in Monte Águila, the "Nuestra Señora del Carmen" Chapel, which dates back to the end of the 19th century, when Monte Águila was nothing more than a small farmhouse with very few houses, being at the beginning of wood, and after an accident that caused a fire that destroyed it, the current cement construction that persists until today was made.

It should also be noted the existence of several churches of the Protestant Christian cult of the Pentecostal branch.

== Sports ==
=== Sports disciplines ===
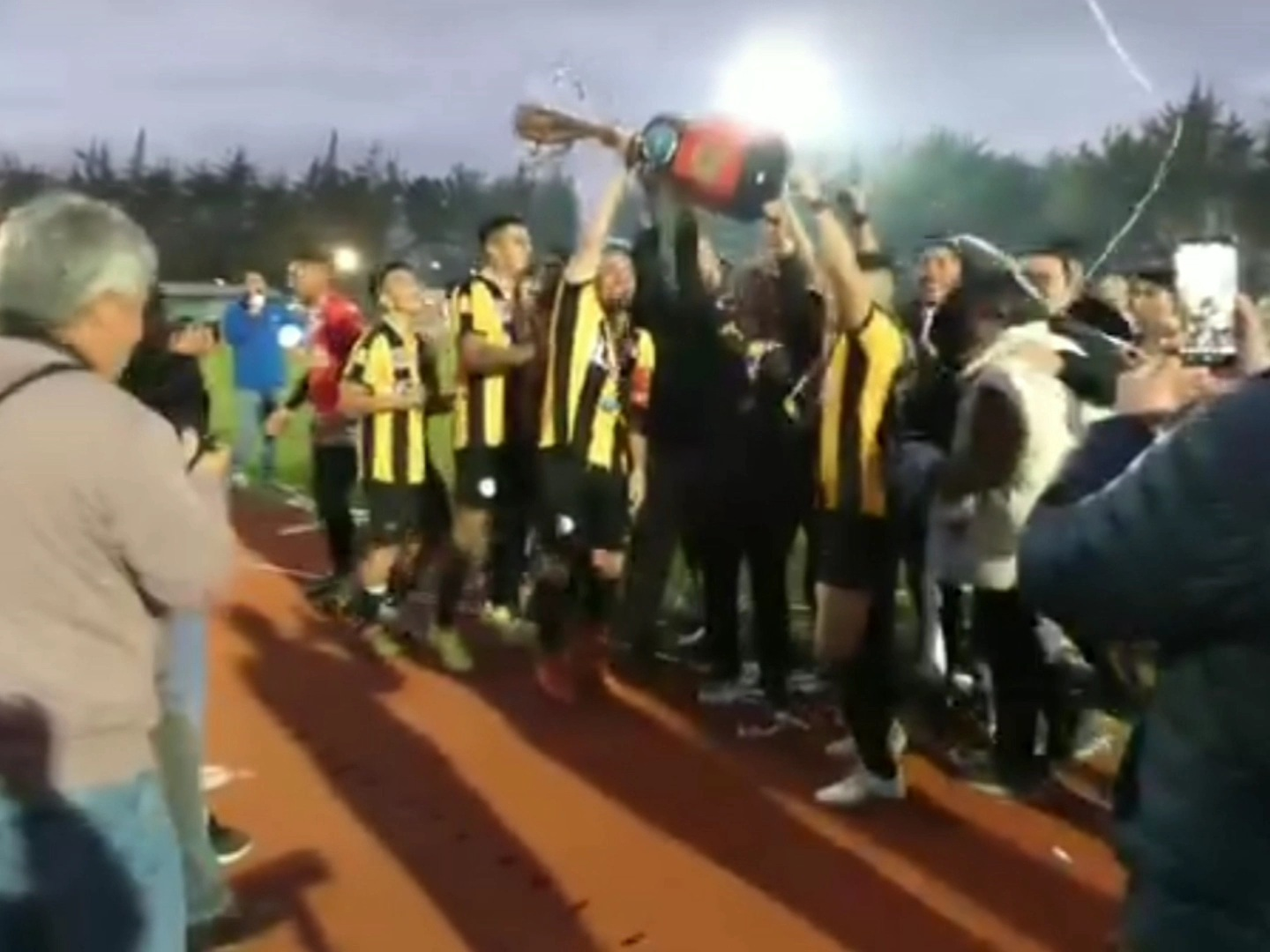
Fans of the "Ferroviarios" Sports Club.

==== Association football ====
In Monte Águila the most popular sport is football, which is mainly reflected in the existence of two clubs in the city “Ferroviarios de Chile” and “El Águila”, rival teams that play in the local football association to which they belong, which is the Bio-Bio Association (Yumbel) within the Asociación Nacional de Fútbol Amateur ANFA. Both teams exercise locality in the Municipal Stadium of Monte Águila. These football clubs are characterized by being social venues recognized for their work in the city, being an important part in their development, both social and sports.

It should also be noted that Monte Águila has been the city of origin for soccer players such as Edgardo Abdala, Justo Farrán and Luis Chavarría.

==== In Line Skate ====
Monte Águila has been during the last years an important roller practice center, having its own club called “Roller Monte Águila”, where its members range between 3 and 30 years of age, and they practice today in the Cabrero Patinadrome, although there are plans for the construction of one in Monte Águila.

==== Motoring ====
During the Fiestas Patrias, amateur car racing competitions, called piques ¼ de milla, are also held during the National Holidays period. These used to be done on land, in the street next to the state, but currently the street is paved.

The practice of this discipline has been criticized, given that the city does not have the necessary security to practice this sport. This would be demonstrated last September 2019, when during that competition an accident occurred that caused four injured.

=== Sports venues ===
==== Monte Águila Municipal Gym ====
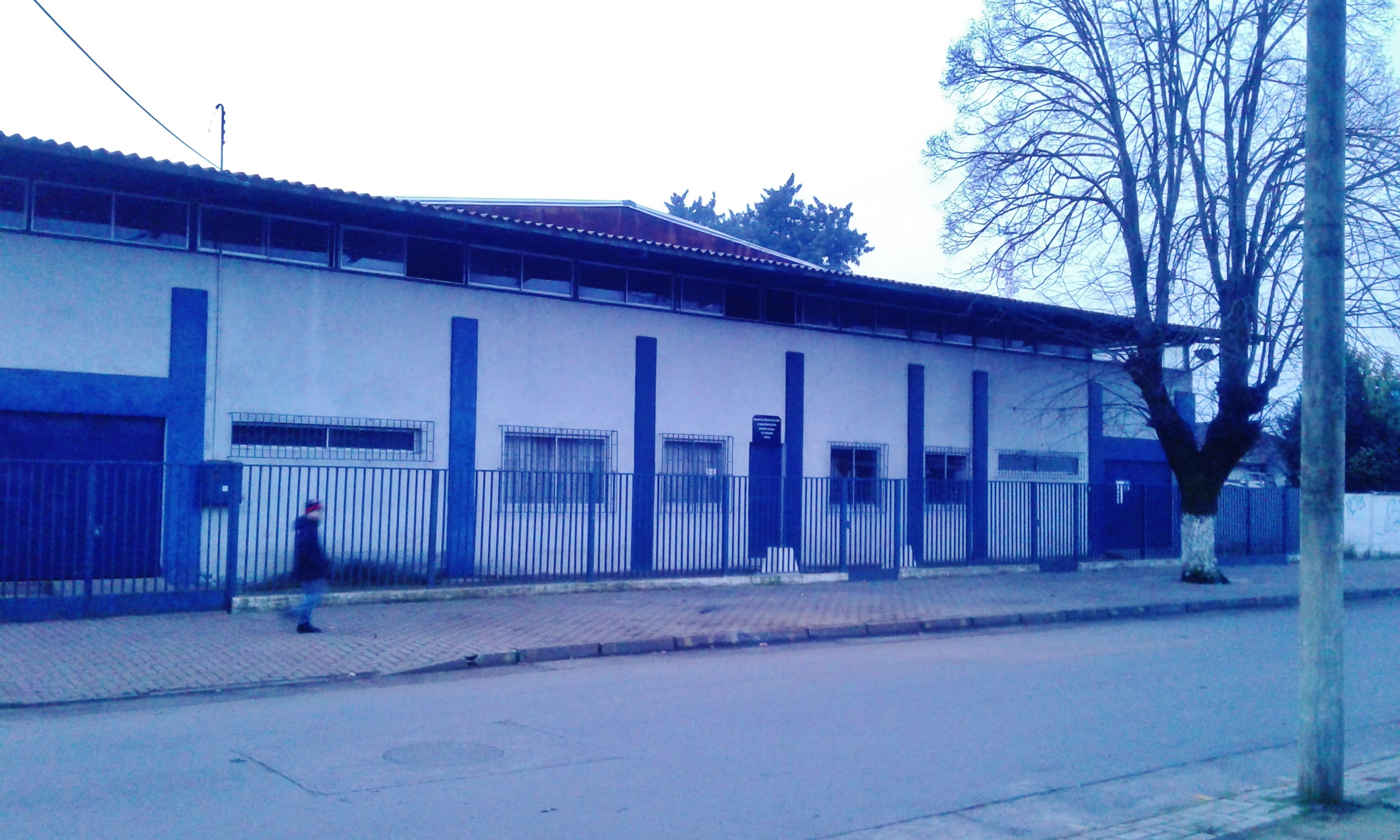
Monte Águila Municipal Gym.

On Carlos Viel Street, next to the annex of the Orlando Vera Elementary School, is the Municipal Gym of Monte Águila, a multipurpose public venue, which is mostly used for sports activities, mainly in-line skate, basketball and other varied sports disciplines.

On September 15 and 16, 2018, the gym hosted an international roller or inline skate championship called “Freestyle Competition”, which was attended by leading national and international skaters.

The gym is usually also used for artistic shows, such as Folk Shows (mainly in September), recreational shows and concerts, the latter especially as a framework for celebrations such as the Verano Monteaguilino.

==== Monte Águila football stadium ====
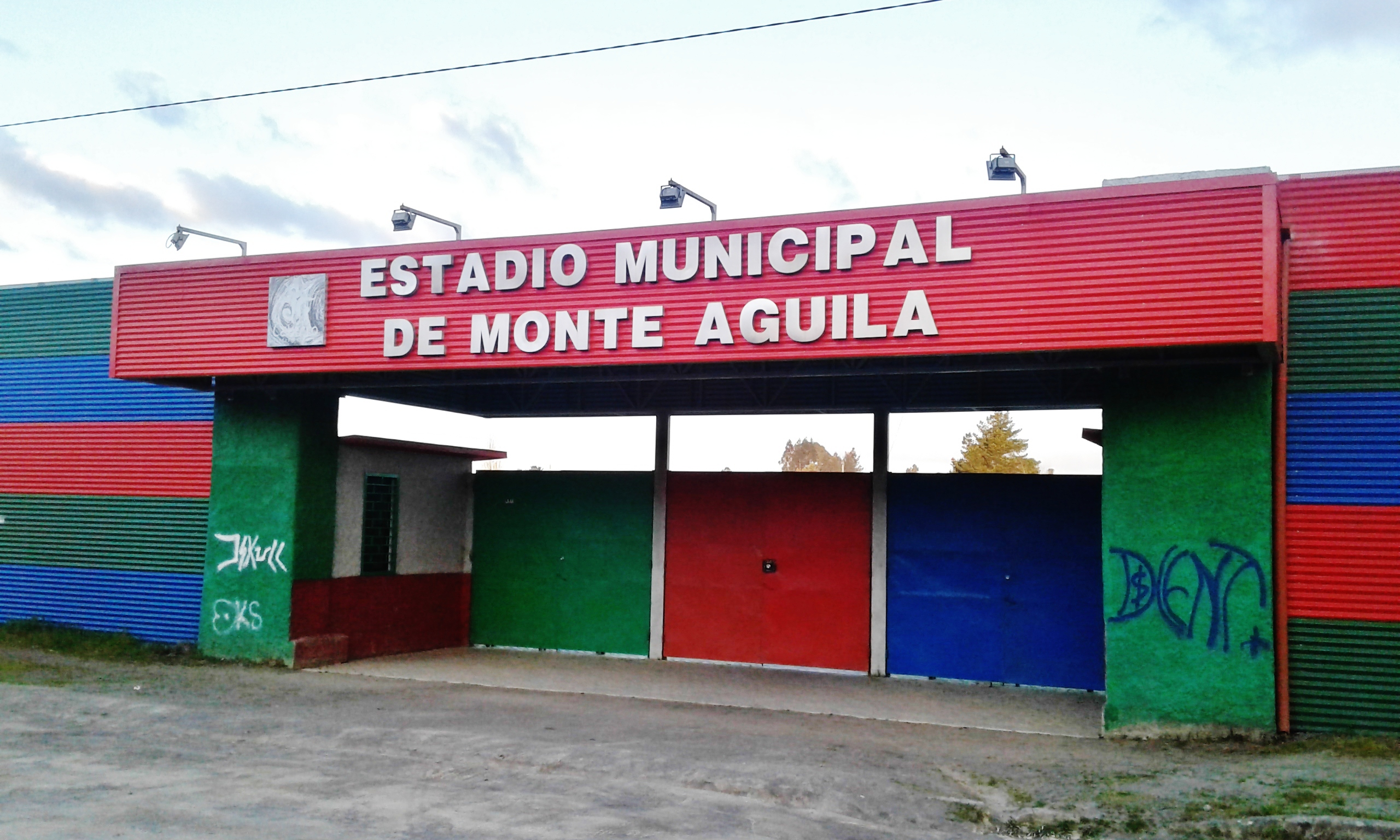
Monte Águila football stadium.

Monte Águila has its own stadium, which is located northwest of the city. For a while, it remained neglected, which led to it being remodeled and reopened in 2016, which proceeded to replace the natural grass with synthetic grass, and completely change the stadium, which received the FIFA certification.

Football is mainly played at the stadium, and the two local teams of the ANFA play locality: “Ferroviarios” and “El Águila”, rival teams that play in the local football association to which they belong, which is the Bio- Bio Association (Yumbel). The Cabrerino team of the Tercera División B of Chile, "Comunal Cabrero", occasionally exercises locality in the same stadium.

==== Sports Complex ====
Municipal enclosure located steps from the stadium. It also usually do sports activities occasionally. It includes extensive grounds, in addition to its own gym. In recent times, this venue is occupied mainly for things outside the sport itself, such as events, such as La Cruz de Mayo or Ramadas, in Fiestas Patrias.
