= Guillermo Arellano =

Chilean footballer (1908-1999)

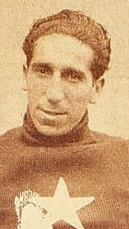

Personal information
- Full name: José Guillermo Arellano Moraga
- Date of birth: 21 August 1908
- Place of birth: Chile
- Date of death: 16 February 1999 (aged 90)
- Height: 1.74 m (5 ft 9 in)
- Position: Forward

Senior career*
Years	Team	Apps	(Gls)
?	Colo-Colo		

International career
1930	Chile	1	(0)
- * Club domestic league appearances and goals

Guillermo Arellano Moraga (21 August 1908 – 16 February 1999) was a Chilean football attacker.
