= Parliament of Coz Coz =

The Parliament of Coz Coz (Spanish: Parlamento de Coz Coz) was a meeting between Mapuches chiefs held on January 18, 1907 to discuss land conflicts with non-Mapuche Chileans. The parliament was organized with the help of Capuchins who invited journalists from Valdivia and Santiago to the meeting. The parliament was held in the vicinity of Panguipulli.
