= Elsa del Campillo =

Chilean actress

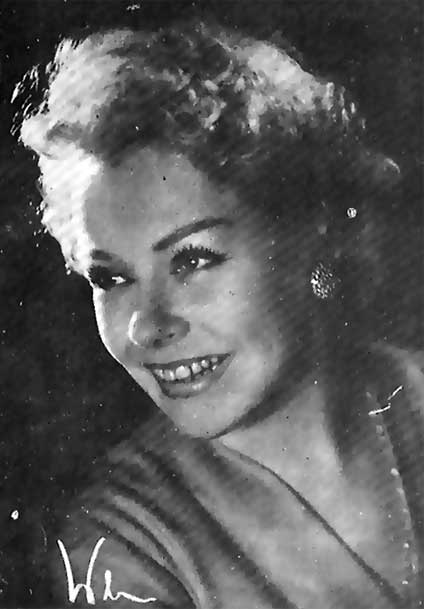
Elsa del Campillo

Elsa Masriera Campillo (August 16, 1912, Chile - December 28, 2009, Buenos Aires, Argentina), better known as Elsa del Campillo, was a Chilean actress who made her acting career in Argentina.

== Filmography ==
- Luces de mis zapatos (1973)
- Amor prohibido (1958)
- La mujer desnuda (1955)
- La vida de una mujer (1951)
- Martín Pescador (1951)
- Sacachispas (1950)
- Miguitas en la cama (1949)
- María de los Ángeles (1948)
- El precio de una vida (1947)
- El último guapo (1947)
- Papá tiene novia (1941)
- Un señor mucamo (1940)
