= Death of Carlos Fariña =

The Case of Carlos Fariña was an event that took place during the military dictatorship of Augusto Pinochet in Chile. It began on 13 October 1973, when a contingent formed by two police (carabineros) officers, four military personnel and two civilians, stopped, kidnapped, and abducted Carlos Patricio Fariña Oyarce, a 13-year-old. He would become the youngest victim in the list of 79 under-age minors killed for political motives during the military regime.

== Abduction ==
In October 1973, Carlos Fariña was a student in primary school. He was detained in his home, on 13 October 1973 at 10 a.m. under the context of a raid of the 'La Pincoya' district in the city of Huechuraba by a group formed by two police (carabineros) officers, four military personnel and two civilians. He was taken to a local football field, as was common in the case of these raids, where all detainees were rounded up to verify identity and select those who would be released and others that would be transferred to other sites. Fariña, who was involved in a conflict with a neighbor over using a firearm resulting in one wounded, was taken by military truck to what has been confirmed recently as the "Yungay" 3rd Infantry Regiment from San Felipe. At the time, this regiment was stationed in the Internado Nacional Barros Arana municipal school building in the commune of Quinta Normal, Santiago. His final location went unknown until 2000.

== Assassination ==
The police official Enrique Erasmo Sandoval Arancibia, alias "Pete el Negro" (Pete the Black), ordered the soldiers under his command to bring the teenager forward, facing away, and shot him four times in the head with his 'Steier' pistol. Afterwards, the body was doused with fuel and burned. They quickly buried the body around 60 centimeters deep in an empty lot at the intersection of Americo Vespucio with San Pablo Avenue, close to the Pudahuel airport. 30 July 2000, a group of laborers who were carrying out construction work discovered the skeletal remains.

== Legal Case ==
In May 2006, the court minister Jorge Zepeda sentenced Major Donato López Almarza, then commander of the Yungay 3rd Regiment, accused as the perpetrator of the abduction and declared homicide of Carlos Fariña as well as two other under-aged minors: Víctor Vidal Tejeda y Héctor Araya Garrido, also killed under similar circumstances. He furthermore convicted an official of the same regiment, Enrique Sandoval Arancibia as the killer of Carlos Fariña. In 2006, Sandoval was working as the chief of security in the Municipality of Providencia, led by ex-soldier and DINA official Cristián Labbé, which created doubts as to the political character of this mayor.
