= Luis Chavarría =

Chilean footballer (born 1970)

Personal information
- Full name: Luis Eugenio Chavarría Andrades
- Date of birth: March 26, 1970 (age 56)
- Place of birth: Monte Águila, Chile
- Position: Midfielder

Senior career*
Years	Team	Apps	(Gls)
1990	Malleco Unido		
1991–1995	Fernández Vial		
1996–2000	Deportes Concepción	133	(15)
2001–2002	Universidad de Chile	46	(1)
2003–2005	Huachipato	110	(9)
2006–2007	Deportes Concepción	38	(1)
2008	Fernández Vial		

International career
1996–2001	Chile	5	(0)
- * Club domestic league appearances and goals

Luis Chavarría (born March 26, 1970, in Chile) is a Chilean former professional footballer who played as a midfielder.

== Personal life ==
He is the uncle of the former footballer Luis Cabezas.
