= Carlos Pezoa Véliz =

Chilean poet, educator and journalist

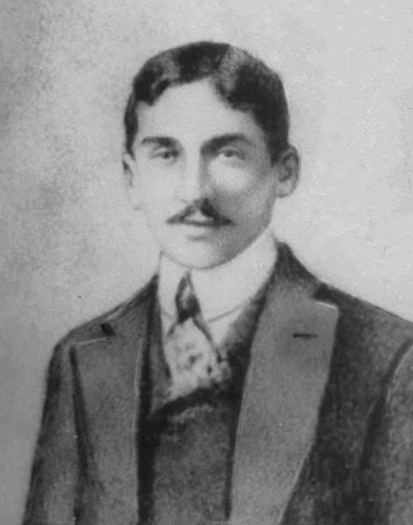
- Carlos Pezoa Véliz in 1905
- Born: July 21, 1879; Santiago, Chile
- Died: April 21, 1908 (Aged 29); Santiago, Chile
- Occupations: Poet, Journalist
- Writing career
- Notable works: Alma chilena, Las campanas de oro, Cuentos y Artículos
- Literary movement: Modernismo, Postmodern literature

Carlos Pezoa Véliz (July 21, 1879 – April 21, 1908) was a poet, educator and journalist from Chile. His literary work remained largely unpublished until his death at the age of 28. He was posthumously recognized as a major figure in the history of Chilean poetry.

== Biography ==
=== Family and youth ===
Pezoa Véliz was born in Santiago, Chile on July 21, 1879, and was the illegitimate son of a Spanish immigrant named Moyano and a young seamstress Elvira Jaña. Early in his infancy he was adopted by José María Pezoa and Emerecia Véliz, an elderly couple who had no children of their own.

=== Literary career ===
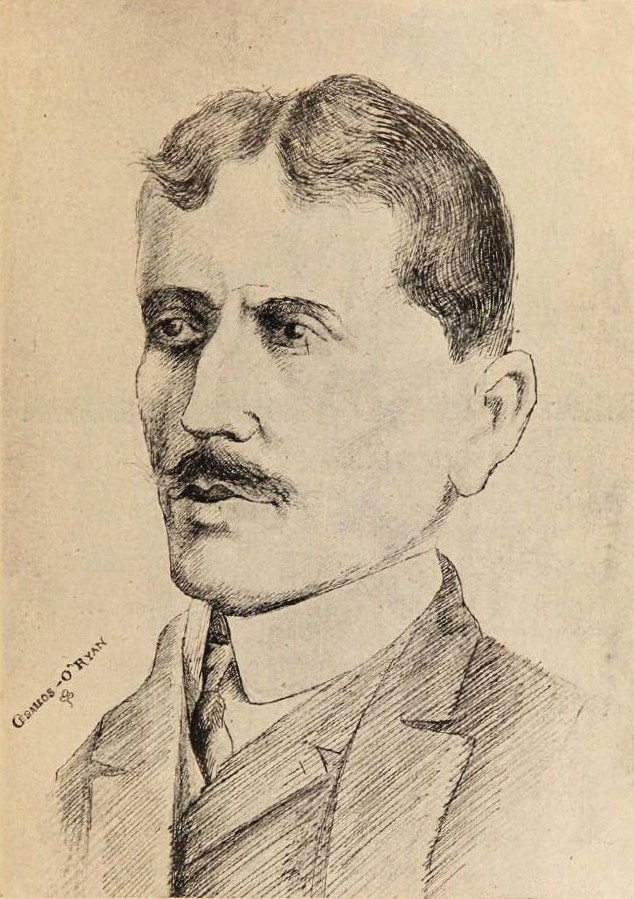
Carlos Pezoa Véliz in 1913

His poetry was written within the post-modernist Latin American movement, which broke with the Symbolist and Parnassian schools of Rubén Darío’s modernism. The poetry of Pezoa Véliz constituted a conscious use of language as a basis for a new vision of the world and in particular a novel way of observing the cultural and psychological roots of all things Chilean. Pezoa Véliz could be considered a founding poet and fundamental figure in the history of Chilean poetry – which has given the world of literature figures like Pablo Neruda, Gabriela Mistral, Gonzalo Rojas and Nicanor Parra.

During his lifetime his body of work was published in journals and periodical publications which were compiled in 1911 - four years after the poet's death - by Ernesto Montenegro under the title of Alma Chilena (The Chilean Soul) – the name of one of Pezoa Véliz's most renowned and cited poem. Subsequently, in 1927, Armando Donoso published a new book including new poems, short stories and journalistic articles under the title Campanas de Oro (The Golden Chimes), which were later on broadened by Nicomedes Guzman in his Antología de Carlos Pezoa Véliz (Anthology of Carlos Pezoa Véliz) (1957; 2 ed 1966).

A poet representative of the roots and voice of the Chilean people; his themes and subject matter derived from sensitive reflections of rural and urban life, impoverished peasants, renegades, the marginalized, the humiliated and fallen. With a language employing both colloquialism and irony, which is interrupted at times by despair and melancholy. His work constitutes a poetry of rebellion, of denunciation, of irony, of parody, and in addition, a lyricism that is both simplistic and profound, in which some critics have seen antecedents of Nicanor Parra.

At the end of the 19th century, he began to publish poems and chronicles on the El búcaro santiaguino, which he did whilst he was a teacher at the San Fidel School, a position from where he was ultimately fired for his intensely bohemian lifestyle.

His major literary influences were Manuel Gutierrez Nájera, Gustavo Adolfo Bécquer and Edgar Allan Poe, Rubén Darío and a taste for modernism for its “oddities” which was influential in the era; but in his work there is also a social element which could have been derived from reading Maxim Gorki and Leo Tolstoy. Subsequently, at the beginning of the 20th century, he took a position as a journalist in the El Chileno, La Comedia Humana and La Voz del Pueblo newspapers. This occupation as a journalist served as a medium that allowed Pezoa Véliz to get close – albeit, as reporter - to the workings and customs of the offices of nitrate mines of the north of Chile, which was vividly documented in his short story: El taita de la oficina. (The office daddy)

These publications appeared regularly in the press and began to give him notoriety in literary and social circles. This notoriety earned him the a prominent position in the Ateneo de Santiago. Later on he was designated Municipal Secretary of Viña del Mar, a city that with Valparaíso played a fundamental role in his cultural and personal life. He continued publishing poetry, verse and narratives in the magazine La lira chilena (The Chilean lyric poem), Pluma y lapis (Writer and pen) and Luz y sombra (Light and shadow) inter alia. From anthologies compiled posthumously, including El perro vagabundo (The vagabond dog), Nada (Nothing), El pintor pereza (The idle painter), El organillo (The Hand Organ) inter alia, remain his most acclaimed poems.

== Literary publications ==
- Alma chilean (1911)
- Las campanas de oro (1920)
- Cuentos y Artículos (1927)
- La lira chilena
- Pluma y lapis
- Luz y sombra
- El perro vagabundo
- Nada
- El pintor pereza
- El organillo
- El taita de la oficina
- Antología de Carlos Pezoa Véliz (1957)
- Carlos Pezoa Véliz, Poesias liricas
