= Carlos Tejas =

Chilean footballer (born 1971)

Personal information
- Full name: Carlos Rodrigo Tejas Pastén
- Date of birth: 4 October 1971 (age 55)
- Place of birth: Iquique, Chile
- Height: 1.83 m (6 ft 0 in)
- Position: Goalkeeper

Senior career*
Years	Team	Apps	(Gls)
1995–1998	Coquimbo Unido		
1998–2001	Santiago Morning		
2001–2002	Coquimbo Unido		
2002–2004	Cobreloa		
2004–2007	Deportes La Serena		
2007–2009	O'Higgins		
2009–2011	Coquimbo Unido		

International career
1997–2002	Chile	0	(0)
1998	Chile B	1	(0)

Managerial career
- Academia Coquimbo (gk coach)
- 2025–: Provincial Ovalle (gk coach)
- * Club domestic league appearances and goals

Carlos Rodrigo Tejas Pastén (born October 4, 1971) is a Chilean former professional footballer who played as a goalkeeper.

== International career ==
Tejas was in Chile's squad for the 1997 Copa América and 1998 FIFA World Cup. In addition, he played for Chile B against England B on February 10, 1998. Chile won by 2–1.

== Personal life ==
He is the father of Carla Tejas, who played for Chile U17 (women) as a goalkeeper just like him.

== Coaching career ==
Tejas has served as goalkeeping coach for Academia Deportiva Coquimbo and Provincial Ovalle.

== Honours ==
Cobreloa

- Primera División de Chile (2): 2003–A, 2003–C
