= José Musalem Saffie =

Chilean politician (1924–2019)

José Musalem
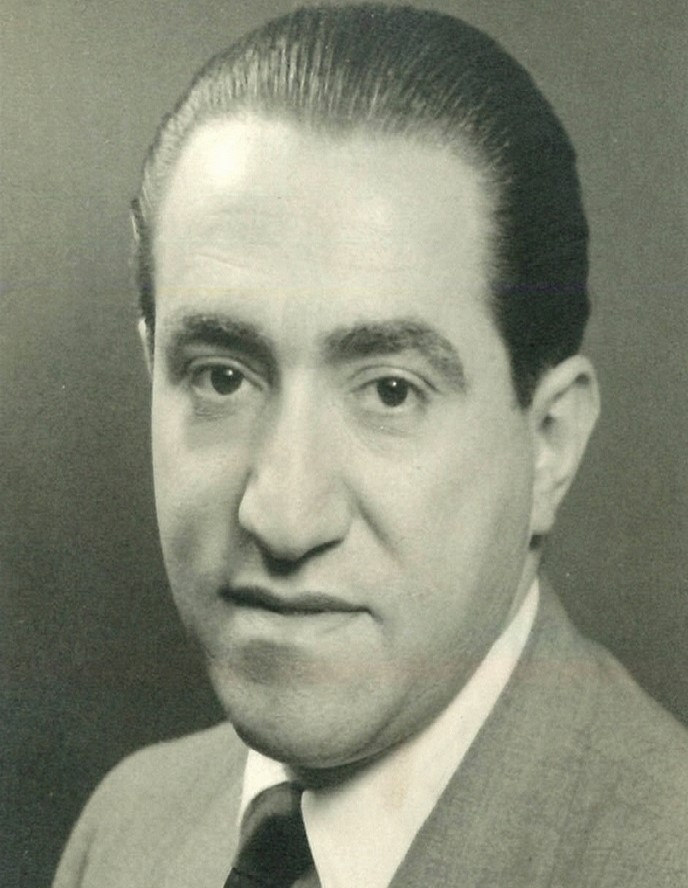

Member of the Senate
- In office 15 May 1965 – 11 September 1973
- Constituency: 4th Provincial Group

Member of the Chamber of Deputies
- In office 15 May 1953 – 15 May 1965
- Constituency: 7th Departamental Group

Personal details
- Born: 30 August 1924 Santiago, Chile
- Died: 17 March 2019 (aged 94) Santiago, Chile
- Party: Conservative Party; National Christian Party; Falange Nacional; Christian Democratic Party
- Spouse: Clemencia Sarquis Yazigi
- Education: University of Chile (LL.B); Harvard University (M.A. in Economics and Public Finance)
- Occupation: Politician
- Profession: Lawyer, notary

José Plácido Musalem Saffie (30 August 1924 – 17 March 2019) was a Chilean lawyer and politician of Arab origin. He served as deputy and senator of the Republic between 1953 and 1973.

== Biography ==
He was the son of Plácido Musalem Dueri and María Inés Saffie Dueri. He studied at the Academia de Humanidades of the Dominican Fathers, the Instituto Andrés Bello and the Liceo de Aplicación, graduating from the latter.

In 1943 he entered the Faculty of Law of the University of Chile, where he was teaching assistant in Constitutional History and Constitutional Law between 1944 and 1948. He graduated in 1950 with the thesis Los problemas de la alimentación mundial y la Conferencia de Hot Springs, receiving his law degree on 4 May 1951.

On 26 May 1949 he married psychologist Clemencia Sarquis Yazigi. In the mid-1950s he pursued a Master’s degree in Economics and Public Finance at Harvard University. Professionally, he worked as a lawyer for commercial and industrial firms. In 1974 he founded GEMIMES, a center for economic studies, and in 1977 the consultancy CRECEM Ltda., where he was general manager.

From 15 June 1983 he served as a notary public, a position he held until his death.

== Political career ==
=== Early career and first deputy term (1946–1956) ===
Attracted by the figure of Eduardo Cruz-Coke, he joined the Conservative Party in 1946, remaining until 1951. In 1952 he founded the National Christian Party (PNC), supporting Carlos Ibáñez del Campo in his successful presidential campaign. He was party president until 1953.

In 1953 he was elected deputy for the 7th Departamental Group of Santiago (1st District) representing the PNC, integrating the permanent commissions of National Defense, Finance, and Labor and Social Legislation. He also served in special investigative commissions on the acquisition of buses (1953–1954) and irregularities in the port of Arica (1956–1957).

=== Founder and deputy of the PDC (1957–1964) ===
Later he joined the Falange Nacional and in 1957 was a founding member of the Christian Democratic Party (PDC), serving twice as vice-president. Reelected deputy in 1957 and 1961, he integrated the permanent commissions of Finance, Labor and Social Legislation, and Internal Police and Regulations. He also participated in special commissions on the copper industry (1961–1962) and on the administration of the National Fund for Public Employees and Journalists (1962).

He promoted motions that became law, such as Law N.º 14.837 (1962) on the creation of the College of Journalists, Law N.º 12.045, and Law N.º 11.999 of 1955 (known as the “Ley de Sábado Inglés”), which amended the 1931 Labour Code to include a special Saturday working day.

=== Senator (1965–1973) ===
In 1965 he was elected senator for the 4th Provincial Constituency of Santiago, integrating commissions on Government, Foreign Affairs, Public Works, Mining, Agriculture, and Education. He represented Chile in various international conferences, such as the 51st International Labour Conference in Geneva (1967) and the 2nd United Nations Conference on Trade and Development in New Delhi (1968).

He was reelected senator in 1973 for the same constituency, serving in the Finance and Public Works commissions. However, his mandate was cut short by the 1973 Chilean coup d'état, which dissolved Congress.

During his parliamentary career, he presented around thirty-two bills, of which at least two became law: Law N.º 17.160, on sickness subsidy rights, and Law N.º 17.227, amending Law N.º 14.140.

== Death ==
José Plácido Musalem died on 17 March 2019 in Santiago at the age of 94.
