= Auquinco (commune) =

Coordinates: 34°46′S 71°12′W

- Former commune
- Interactive map of Auquinco
- Country: Chile
- Province: Curicó
- Department: Santa Cruz

Population (1920)
  - Total: 2,886

Auquinco was one of the communes that was part of the department of Santa Cruz, in the province of Curicó.

The 1920 Chilean census established it had a population of 2.886 inhabitants.

== History ==
The commune of Auquinco was created by Decree number 3.458 on 19 August 1918.

It was suppressed by the Decree with Force of Law No. 8.583, on 30 December 1927, by dictator Carlos Ibáñez del Campo as part of a greater political and administrative reform, adding its territory to the commune of Chépica. The commune was effectively suppressed on 1 February 1928.
