= Aníbal Zañartu =

Chilean political figure

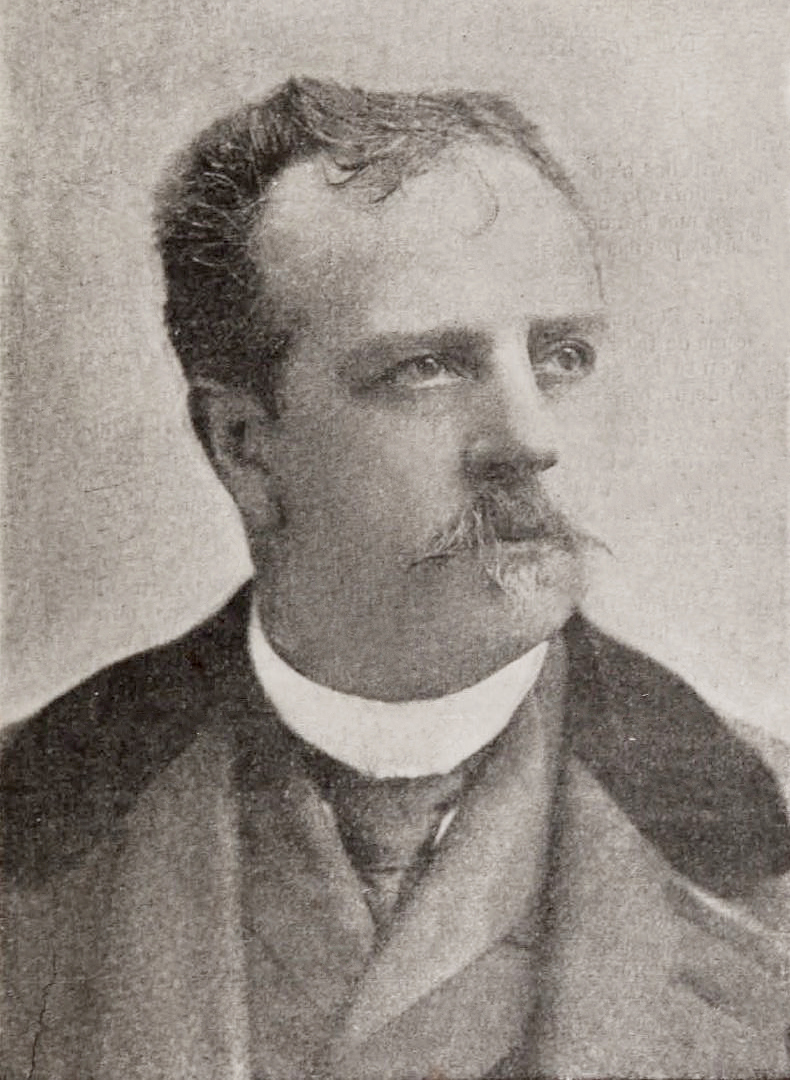

Vice President of Chile
- In office 12 July 1901 – 18 September 1901
- Preceded by: Federico Errázuriz Echaurren
- Succeeded by: Germán Riesco Errázuriz

Personal details
- Born: Aníbal Zañartu Zañartu; 12 April 1847 Concepción, Chile
- Died: 1 February 1902 (aged 54) Tomé, Chile
- Cause of death: Heart attack
- Party: Liberal
- Spouse: Amelia Íñiguez Vicuña
- Children: 6
- Parent(s): Miguel José de Zañartu Santa María; Juana de Mata Zañartu
- Education: Universidad de Chile

Aníbal Zañartu Zañartu (Latin American Spanish: [aˈniβal saˈɲaɾtu]; 12 April 1847 – 1 February 1902) was a Chilean political figure. He served several times as minister and, for a brief time, as vice president in 1901. He was a member of the Liberal Party.

== Early life ==
He was born in Concepción, the son of Miguel José de Zañartu Santa María and of Juana de Mata Zañartu. After completing his studies in his native city, he graduated as a lawyer from the Universidad de Chile on July 19, 1870. Zañartu married Amelia Iñiguez Vicuña and they had six children. He owned a carbon mine in the Dichato beach, near Tomé. Aníbal Zañartu was of Basque descent.

== Career ==
He started his political career as plenipotentiary ambassador to Ecuador, in 1880, during the War of the Pacific. In 1882 he was elected as a deputy for San Fernando. In 1885 he was first elected as a deputy for Chillán, on August 22 was elected president of the Chamber of Deputies and, on September 3, was named Minister of Foreign Affairs and Colonization by President Domingo Santa María. On June 28, 1887 President José Manuel Balmaceda named him Minister of the Interior.

In 1888 Zañartu was elected a Senator for Concepción, and was reelected in 1894. On June 3, 1892, he was elected vice-president of the Senate. President Federico Errázuriz Echaurren named him Minister of the Interior in 1896 and again in 1901. After the death of President Errázuriz Echaurren the same year, he served as Vice President of Chile from July 12 until September 18, when the elected successor, Germán Riesco, took over. In the same election, Zañartu was elected as a Senator for Ñuble. He died soon after, in his home in Tomé, at the age of 55.

On 30 July 1901, the Daily Mail announced his resignation, but in fact that had no consequences because of the coming end of his vice presidency.

Political offices
Preceded by Aniceto Vergara	Minister of Foreign Affairs and Colonization; 1885-1886	Succeeded by Joaquín Godoy
Preceded by Carlos Antúnez	Minister of the Interior; 1887-1888	Succeeded by Pedro Lucio Cuadra
Preceded by Osvaldo Rengifo	Minister of the Interior; 1896	Succeeded by Carlos Antúnez
Preceded by Domingo Amunátegui	Minister of the Interior; 1901	Succeeded by Ramón Barros Luco
Preceded by Federico Errázuriz Echaurren	Vice President of Chile; 1901	Succeeded by Germán Riesco
