= Eduardo Matte =

Chilean lawyer and politician (1847–1902)

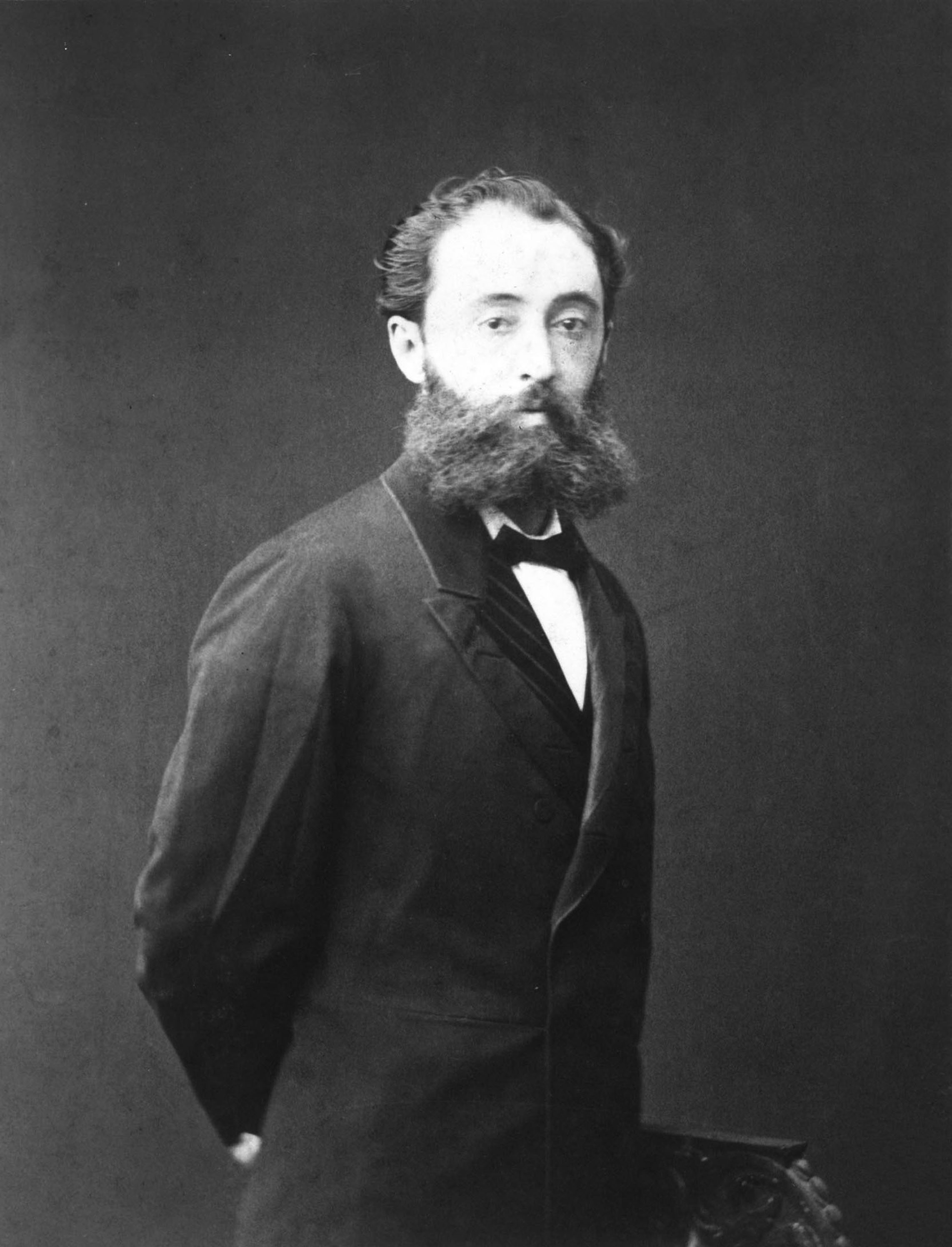

Member of the Senate
- In office 1900 – 3 December 1902
- Constituency: Atacama Province

President of the Chamber of Deputies
- In office 23 December 1896 – 2 June 1897

Member of the Chamber of Deputies
- In office 1879–1900
- Constituency: Santiago
- In office 1873–1876
- Constituency: La Serena, Elqui and Coquimbo

Minister of the Interior
- In office 1892–1892
- President: Jorge Montt

Minister of Foreign Affairs, Worship and Colonization
- In office 1889–1889
- President: José Manuel Balmaceda

Personal details
- Born: 8 January 1847 Santiago, Chile
- Died: 3 December 1902 (aged 55) Santiago, Chile
- Party: Liberal Party
- Spouse: Elvira Gormaz Aráoz
- Children: 12
- Parent(s): Domingo Matte Mesías; Rosario Pérez Vargas
- Education: University of Chile (LL.B)
- Profession: Lawyer

Eduardo Matte Pérez (8 January 1847 – 3 December 1902) was a Chilean lawyer and Liberal politician who served as a member and president of the Chamber of Deputies of Chile, as a senator for Atacama Province, and as a minister of state under presidents José Manuel Balmaceda and Jorge Montt.

Matte had a lengthy parliamentary career, representing Santiago in the Chamber of Deputies for several terms before being elected senator for Atacama in 1900.

== Early life ==
Matte was born in Santiago on 8 January 1847 to Domingo Matte Mesías and Rosario Pérez Vargas. He studied law at the University of Chile and qualified as a lawyer in 1868.

Following his graduation, Matte practiced law and represented major business interests. He later became a lawyer for Banco Matte, which was owned by his family.

He married Elvira Gormaz Aráoz, with whom he had twelve children, including Jorge, Eleodoro, Luis Enrique, Eduardo, Elvira, Ana, Julia, Victoria, Rosario, Tránsito and Inés Gabriela.

== Political career ==
A member of the Liberal Party, Matte participated on several occasions in the party's leadership.

He first entered the Chamber of Deputies as a deputy for La Serena, Elqui and Coquimbo for the 1873–1876 parliamentary period. He served on the permanent committee for finance and industry.

Matte returned to the Chamber as a deputy for Santiago for the 1879–1882 term. He was subsequently reelected for the same constituency for the 1882–1885, 1885–1888 and 1888–1891 parliamentary periods.

He continued to represent Santiago during the 1891–1894 parliamentary period and was subsequently reelected for the 1894–1897 and 1897–1900 terms. Throughout his parliamentary career, he participated in several permanent committees, including those for finance and industry; constitution, legislation and justice; education and charity; government and foreign relations; and war and navy.

Matte served as President of the Chamber of Deputies of Chile from 23 December 1896 to 2 June 1897.

In addition to his parliamentary career, Matte held ministerial office. During the presidency of José Manuel Balmaceda, he served as Minister of Foreign Affairs, Worship and Colonization in 1889. In 1892, under President Jorge Montt, he served as Minister of the Interior.

In 1900, Matte was elected to the Senate for Atacama Province for the 1900–1906 parliamentary period. He died before completing his term and was succeeded by Aníbal Zañartu Zañartu.

Matte died in Santiago on 3 December 1902, aged 55.

== Bibliographical References ==
- Diccionario Biográfico de Chile; Empresa Periodística "Chile"; Imprenta y Litografía Universo; Santiago, Chile, 1936; Tomo II.
- Diccionario histórico, Biográfico y Bibliográfico de Chile: 1800–1928; Virgilio Figueroa; Establecimientos Gráficos "Balcells & Co."; Santiago, Chile, 1928; Tomo III.
- Genealogía de Eduardo Matte Pérez
