= Ministry of the Interior (Chile) =

Government ministry of Chile

- Ministerio del Interior
- Traditional seal

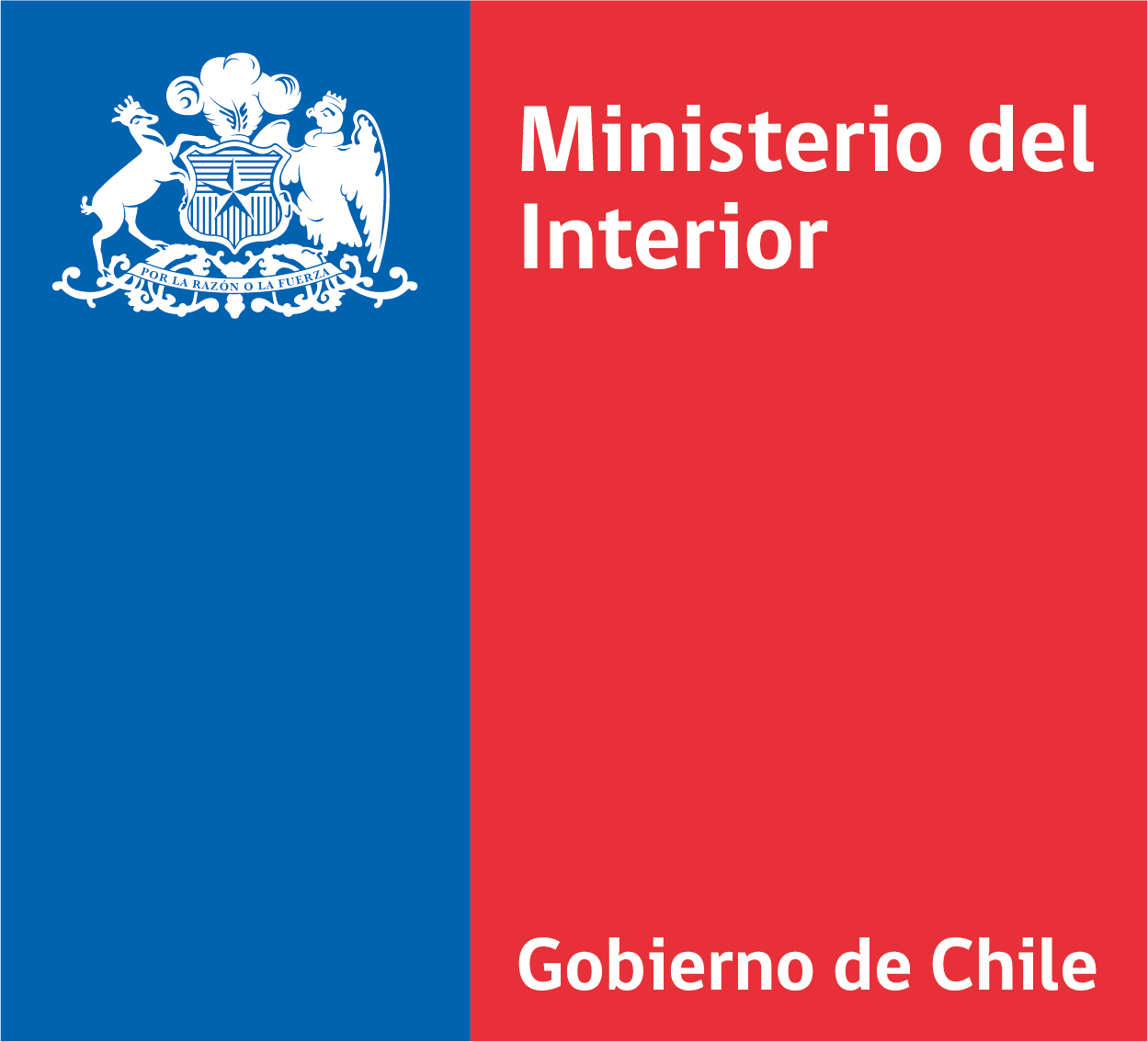
- Government logo

Agency overview
- Formed: 2011
- Type: Ministry
- Jurisdiction: Government of Chile
- Headquarters: Santiago
- Ministers responsible: Claudio Alvarado, Minister of the Interior; Máximo Pavez, Undersecretary of the Interior; Sebastián Figueroa, Undersecretary of Regional and Administrative Development
- Child agencies: Agencia Nacional de Inteligencia; Carabineros de Chile; Investigations Police of Chile; ONEMI
- Website: Official website (in Spanish)

The Ministry of the Interior (Spanish: Ministerio del Interior) is the cabinet-level office responsible for home affairs in Chile. It is tasked with "maintaining public order, security and social peace" within the country. The ministry is also responsible for planning, directing, coordinating, executing, controlling, and informing the domestic policies formulated by the president of Chile. As the authority in charge of local government, the minister supervises all non-elected regional authorities.

In the absence of the president of Chile (due to travel, death, or other impediment), the minister of the interior assumes the role of 'vice president'. However, this is not a true vice-presidential position but rather a designated acting president role, as the post of Vice President of Chile has not existed since 1833.

Since March 2026, Claudio Alvarado has served as Minister of the Interior, Máximo Pavez as Undersecretary of the Interior, and Sebastián Figueroa as Undersecretary of Regional and Administrative Development.

== History ==
During the first days of the independence movements, the senior "secretary" of the respective Junta functioned as the Secretary of Government. The office was officially established on 27 October 1812, when it was one of the two secretariats created by the Constitutional Norms approved on that date. It was initially named the Secretariat of the Interior. It was abolished in 1814 by the Spanish authorities when, after the Battle of Rancagua, they reasserted royal power.

In 1818, after independence, the secretariat was re-established, but this time as the Ministry of Government (1817–18), later renamed the Ministry of the Interior and Foreign Affairs (1829–71). During this period, its functions typically encompassed the future Ministry of Foreign Affairs, which was separated as an independent government administration in 1871.

On 1 June 2026, President José Antonio Kast announced a bill to merge the Ministry of the Interior and the Ministry Secretary-General of Government into a single entity.

This ministry has undergone several reorganizations throughout its long history, reflected in its various names:

- Ministry of Government (1817–18)
- Ministry of Government and Foreign Affairs (1818–29)
- Ministry of the Interior and Foreign Affairs (1829–71)
- Ministry of the Interior (1871–2011; 2025–present)
- Ministry of the Interior and Public Security (2011–2025)

The role of chief of government was unofficially assumed by the Minister of the Interior and Public Security (1891–1925).

== List of ministers ==
=== Patria Vieja period ===
Picture	Name	Entered office	Exited office	Notes	Appointed by
	José Gaspar Marín Esquivel	18 September 1810	4 July 1811	Served concurrently	Government Junta of the Kingdom of Chile
	José Gregorio Argomedo Montero	18 September 1810	4 July 1811	Served concurrently	Government Junta of the Kingdom of Chile
	Manuel Joaquín de Valdivieso Maciel	10 August 1811	4 September 1811		Second Junta
	Agustín Vial Santelices	4 September 1811	15 November 1811	Served concurrently	Third Junta
	José Gregorio Argomedo Montero	4 September 1811	15 November 1811	Served concurrently	Third Junta
	Manuel Rodríguez Erdoíza	16 December 1811	2 April 1812		Fifth Junta
	Agustín Vial Santelices	2 April 1812	2 October 1812		Sixth Junta
	Agustín Vial Santelices	27 October 1812	1 April 1813	Secretary of the Interior	Sixth Junta
	Manuel de Salas Corbalán	1 April 1813	13 April 1813	Served concurrently	Government Junta of Chile (April 1813)
	Mariano Egaña Fabres	1 April 1813	13 April 1813	Served concurrently	Government Junta of Chile (April 1813)
	Mariano Egaña Fabres	13 April 1813	9 March 1814	Secretary of Government	Government Junta of Chile (April 1813)
	José María Villareal	14 March 1814	23 July 1814	Secretary of Government	Francisco de la Lastra
	Bernardo de Vera y Pintado	23 July 1814	10 August 1814	Secretary of Government and Finance	Government Junta of Chile (July 1814)
	Manuel Rodríguez Erdoíza	10 August 1814	2 October 1814	Secretary of Government and Finance	Government Junta of Chile (July 1814)

=== Government and foreign affairs ===
Picture	Name	Entered office	Exited office	Notes	Appointed by
	Miguel Zañartu y Santa María	18 February 1817	1 August 1818		Bernardo O'Higgins
	Antonio José de Irisarri Alonso	1 August 1818	30 October 1818		Bernardo O'Higgins
	Joaquín Echeverría Larraín	30 October 1818	28 January 1823		Bernardo O'Higgins
	Mariano Egaña Fabres	28 January 1823	12 July 1824		Government Junta
	Francisco Antonio Pinto Díaz	12 July 1824	22 February 1825		Ramón Freire
	Francisco Ramón Vicuña Larraín	22 February 1825	18 June 1825		Ramón Freire
	Juan de Dios Vial del Río	18 June 1825	9 October 1825		Ramón Freire
	Joaquín Campino Salamanca	9 October 1825	8 March 1826		Ramón Freire
	Ventura Blanco Encalada	8 March 1826	20 October 1826		Ramón Freire
	Manuel José Gandarillas Guzmán	20 October 1826	8 March 1827		Agustín Eyzaguirre
	José Miguel del Solar Marín	8 March 1827	13 December 1827		Ramón Freire
	Carlos Rodríguez Erdoyza	13 December 1827	16 July 1829		Francisco Antonio Pinto
	Melchor José Ramos Font	16 July 1829	9 November 1829		Francisco Ramón Vicuña
	José Nicolás de la Cerda Santiago Concha	9 November 1829	7 December 1829		Francisco Ramón Vicuña

=== Interior and foreign affairs ===
Picture	Name	Entered office	Exited office	Notes	Appointed by
	Juan Francisco Meneses Echanes	20 February 1830	5 April 1830		Francisco Ruiz-Tagle
	Diego Portales Palazuelos	5 April 1830	31 August 1831	Appointed by	José Tomás Ovalle
	Diego Portales Palazuelos	5 April 1830	31 August 1831	Reappointed by	Fernando Errázuriz Aldunate
	Ramón Errázuriz Aldunate	31 August 1831	17 May 1832		José Joaquín Prieto Vial
	Joaquín Tocornal Jiménez	17 May 1832	9 November 1835		José Joaquín Prieto Vial
	Diego Portales Palazuelos	9 November 1835	6 June 1837	Interim	José Joaquín Prieto Vial
	Joaquín Tocornal Jiménez	7 June 1837	25 July 1840		José Joaquín Prieto Vial
	Manuel Montt Torres	25 July 1840	27 March 1841		José Joaquín Prieto Vial
	José Miguel Yrarrázaval Alcalde	27 March 1841	19 May 1841		José Joaquín Prieto Vial
	Ramón Luis Yrarrázaval Alcalde	19 May 1841	10 April 1845	Appointed by	José Joaquín Prieto Vial
	Ramón Luis Yrarrázaval Alcalde	19 May 1841	10 April 1845	Reappointed by	Manuel Bulnes
	Manuel Montt Torres	10 April 1845	18 September 1846		Manuel Bulnes
	Manuel Camilo Vial Formas	18 September 1846	12 June 1849		Manuel Bulnes
	José Joaquín Pérez Mascayano	12 June 1849	19 April 1850		Manuel Bulnes
	Antonio Varas de la Barra	19 April 1850	18 September 1856	Appointed by	Manuel Bulnes
	Antonio Varas de la Barra	19 April 1850	18 September 1856	Reappointed by	Manuel Montt
	Francisco Javier Ovalle Bezanilla	29 September 1857	18 September 1856		Manuel Montt
	Jerónimo Urmeneta García-Abello	29 September 1857	1 May 1860		Manuel Montt
	Antonio Varas de la Barra	1 May 1860	18 September 1861		Manuel Montt
	Manuel Alcalde Velasco	18 September 1861	9 July 1862		José Joaquín Pérez Mascayano
	Manuel Antonio Tocornal y Grez	9 July 1862	10 May 1864		José Joaquín Pérez Mascayano
	Alvaro Covarrubias Ortúzar	10 May 1864	8 September 1866	Minister of the Interior	José Joaquín Pérez Mascayano
	Alvaro Covarrubias Ortúzar	8 September 1866	26 September 1867		José Joaquín Pérez Mascayano
	Francisco Vargas Fontecilla	26 September 1867	13 November 1868		José Joaquín Pérez Mascayano
	Miguel Luis Amunátegui Aldunate	13 November 1868	2 August 1870		José Joaquín Pérez Mascayano
	Belisario Prats Pérez	2 August 1870	18 September 1871		José Joaquín Pérez Mascayano
	Eulogio Altamirano Aracena	18 September 1871	2 December 1871		Federico Errázuriz Zañartu

=== Interior ===
Picture	Name	Entered office	Exited office	Notes	Appointed by
	Eulogio Altamirano Aracena	2 December 1871	18 September 1876		Federico Errázuriz Zañartu
	José Victorino Lastarria Santander	18 September 1876	27 October 1877		Aníbal Pinto Garmendia
	Pedro Vicente Reyes Palazuelos	27 October 1877	5 August 1878		Aníbal Pinto Garmendia
	Belisario Prats Pérez	5 August 1878	17 April 1879		Aníbal Pinto Garmendia
	Antonio Varas de la Barra	17 April 1879	20 August 1879		Aníbal Pinto Garmendia
	Domingo Santa María González	20 August 1879	16 June 1880		Aníbal Pinto Garmendia
	Manuel José Recabarren Rencoret	16 June 1880	18 September 1881		Aníbal Pinto Garmendia
	José Francisco Vergara	18 September 1881	12 April 1882		Domingo Santa María
	José Manuel Balmaceda Fernández	12 April 1882	3 September 1885		Domingo Santa María
	Ramón Barros Luco	3 September 1885	22 October 1885		Domingo Santa María
	José Ignacio Vergara Urzúa	22 October 1885	18 September 1886		Domingo Santa María
	Eusebio Lillo Robles	18 September 1886	30 November 1886		José Manuel Balmaceda
	Carlos Antúnez González	30 November 1886	28 June 1887		José Manuel Balmaceda
	Aníbal Zañartu Zañartu	28 June 1887	13 April 1888		José Manuel Balmaceda
	Pedro Lucio Cuadra Luque	13 April 1888	2 November 1888		José Manuel Balmaceda
	Ramón Barros Luco	2 November 1888	11 June 1889		José Manuel Balmaceda
	Demetrio Lastarria Villarreal	11 June 1889	23 October 1889		José Manuel Balmaceda
	Ramón Donoso Vergara	23 October 1889	7 November 1889		José Manuel Balmaceda
	Mariano Sánchez Fontecilla	7 November 1889	21 January 1890		José Manuel Balmaceda
	Adolfo Ibáñez Gutiérrez	21 January 1890	30 May 1890		José Manuel Balmaceda
	Enrique Salvador Sanfuentes Andonaegui	30 May 1890	7 August 1890		José Manuel Balmaceda
	Belisario Prats Pérez	7 August 1890	15 October 1890		José Manuel Balmaceda
	Claudio Vicuña Guerrero	15 October 1890	12 March 1891		José Manuel Balmaceda
	Domingo Godoy Cruz	12 March 1891	29 March 1891		José Manuel Balmaceda
	Julio Bañados Espinoza	29 March 1891	29 August 1891		José Manuel Balmaceda
	Manuel José Yrarrázaval Larraín	7 September 1891	31 December 1891		Revolutionary Junta of Iquique
	Ramón Barros Luco	31 December 1891	14 March 1892		Jorge Montt Álvarez
	Eduardo Matte Pérez	14 March 1892	9 July 1892		Jorge Montt Álvarez
	Ramón Barros Luco	9 July 1892	22 April 1893		Jorge Montt Álvarez
	Pedro Montt Montt	22 April 1893	26 April 1894		Jorge Montt Álvarez
	Enrique Mac-Iver Rodríguez	26 April 1894	7 December 1894		Jorge Montt Álvarez
	Ramón Barros Luco	7 December 1894	1 August 1895		Jorge Montt Álvarez
	Manuel José Recabarren Rencoret	1 August 1895	24 November 1895		Jorge Montt Álvarez
	Osvaldo Rengifo Vial	24 November 1895	18 September 1896		Jorge Montt Álvarez
	Aníbal Zañartu Zañartu	18 September 1896	26 November 1896		Federico Errázuriz Echaurren
	Carlos Antúnez González	26 November 1896	26 June 1897		Federico Errázuriz Echaurren
	Augusto Orrego Luco	26 June 1897	25 August 1897		Federico Errázuriz Echaurren
	Antonio Valdés Cuevas	25 August 1897	14 April 1898		Federico Errázuriz Echaurren
	Carlos Walker Martínez	14 April 1898	27 June 1899		Federico Errázuriz Echaurren
	Raimundo Silva Cruz	27 June 1899	2 September 1899		Federico Errázuriz Echaurren
	Rafael Sotomayor Gaete	2 September 1899	27 November 1899		Federico Errázuriz Echaurren
	Elías Fernández Albano	27 November 1899	3 November 1900		Federico Errázuriz Echaurren
	Mariano Sánchez Fontecilla	3 November 1900	27 December 1900		Federico Errázuriz Echaurren
	Juan Antonio Orrego	27 December 1900	14 March 1901		Federico Errázuriz Echaurren
	Domingo Amunátegui Rivera	14 March 1901	1 May 1901		Federico Errázuriz Echaurren
	Aníbal Zañartu Zañartu	14 March 1901	12 July 1901		Federico Errázuriz Echaurren
	Luis Martiniano Rodríguez Herrera	12 July 1901	18 September 1901	Interim	Aníbal Zañartu Zañartu
	Ramón Barros Luco	18 September 1901	19 November 1901		Germán Riesco Errázuriz
	Ismael Tocornal Tocornal	19 November 1901	6 May 1902		Germán Riesco Errázuriz
	Ramón Barros Luco	6 May 1902	20 November 1902		Germán Riesco Errázuriz
	Elías Fernández Albano	20 November 1902	4 April 1903		Germán Riesco Errázuriz
	Ramón Barros Luco	4 April 1903	10 June 1903		Germán Riesco Errázuriz
	Rafael Sotomayor Gaete	10 June 1903	1 September 1903		Germán Riesco Errázuriz
	Ricardo Matte Pérez	1 September 1903	23 October 1903		Germán Riesco Errázuriz
	Arturo Besa Navarro	23 October 1903	10 January 1904		Germán Riesco Errázuriz
	Rafael Valentín Errázuriz Urmeneta	10 January 1904	12 March 1904		Germán Riesco Errázuriz
	Manuel Egidio Ballesteros	12 March 1904	12 April 1904		Germán Riesco Errázuriz
	Rafael Sotomayor Gaete	12 April 1904	30 October 1904		Germán Riesco Errázuriz
	Emilio Bello Codesido	30 October 1904	18 March 1905		Germán Riesco Errázuriz
	José Rafael Balmaceda Fernández	18 March 1905	1 August 1905		Germán Riesco Errázuriz
	Juan Antonio Orrego	1 August 1905	21 October 1905		Germán Riesco Errázuriz
	Miguel Cruchaga Tocornal	21 October 1905	19 March 1906		Germán Riesco Errázuriz
	José Ramón Gutiérrez Martínez	19 March 1906	7 May 1906		Germán Riesco Errázuriz
	Manuel Salinas González	7 May 1906	18 September 1906		Germán Riesco Errázuriz
	Javier Ángel Figueroa Larraín	18 September 1906	29 October 1906		Pedro Montt
	Vicente Santa Cruz Vargas	29 October 1906	12 June 1907		Pedro Montt
	Luis Antonio Vergara Ruiz	12 June 1907	25 October 1907		Pedro Montt
	Rafael Sotomayor Gaete	25 October 1907	29 August 1908		Pedro Montt
	Javier Ángel Figueroa Larraín	29 August 1908	22 January 1909		Pedro Montt
	Eduardo Charme Fernández	22 January 1909	15 June 1909		Pedro Montt
	Enrique Rodríguez Carmona	15 June 1909	15 September 1909		Pedro Montt
	Ismael Tocornal Tocornal	15 September 1909	25 June 1910		Pedro Montt
	Agustín Edwards Mac-Clure	25 June 1910	8 July 1910		Pedro Montt
	Elías Fernández Albano	8 July 1910	9 August 1910		Pedro Montt
	Luis Izquierdo Fredes	9 August 1910	10 November 1910	Interim	Elías Fernández Albano
	Enrique Rodríguez Carmona	10 November 1910	23 December 1910		Emiliano Figueroa Larraín
	Maximiliano Ibáñez Ibáñez	23 December 1910	11 January 1911		Ramón Barros Luco
	Rafael Orrego González	11 January 1911	15 August 1911		Ramón Barros Luco
	José Ramón Gutiérrez Martínez	15 August 1911	6 January 1912		Ramón Barros Luco
	Abraham Ovalle Ovalle	6 January 1912	23 January 1912		Ramón Barros Luco
	Ismael Tocornal Tocornal	23 January 1912	29 May 1912		Ramón Barros Luco
	Guillermo Rivera Cotapos	29 May 1912	8 August 1912		Ramón Barros Luco
	Guillermo Barros Jara	8 August 1912	15 June 1913		Ramón Barros Luco
	Manuel Rivas Vicuña	15 June 1913	16 November 1913		Ramón Barros Luco
	Rafael Orrego González	16 November 1913	6 September 1914		Ramón Barros Luco
	Eduardo Charme Fernández	6 September 1914	15 September 1914		Ramón Barros Luco
	Guillermo Barros Jara	15 September 1914	15 December 1914		Ramón Barros Luco
	Pedro Nicolás Montenegro	15 December 1914	29 March 1915		Ramón Barros Luco
	Enrique Rodríguez Carmona	29 March 1915	7 June 1915		Ramón Barros Luco
	Enrique Villegas Echiburú	7 June 1915	15 December 1915		Ramón Barros Luco
	Guillermo Barros Jara	15 December 1915	23 December 1915		Ramón Barros Luco
	José Elías Balmaceda Fernández	23 December 1915	8 January 1916		Juan Luis Sanfuentes
	Maximiliano Ibáñez Ibáñez	8 January 1916	1 July 1916		Juan Luis Sanfuentes
	Luis Izquierdo Fredes	1 July 1916	20 November 1916		Juan Luis Sanfuentes
	Enrique Zañartu Prieto	20 November 1916	14 July 1917		Juan Luis Sanfuentes
	Ismael Tocornal Tocornal	14 July 1917	13 October 1917		Juan Luis Sanfuentes
	Eliodoro Yáñez Ponce de León	13 October 1917	18 January 1918		Juan Luis Sanfuentes
	Domingo Amunátegui Solar	18 January 1918	22 April 1918		Juan Luis Sanfuentes
	Arturo Alessandri Palma	22 April 1918	6 September 1918		Juan Luis Sanfuentes
	Pedro García de la Huerta Izquierdo	6 September 1918	28 November 1918		Juan Luis Sanfuentes
	Armando Quezada Acharán	28 November 1918	3 May 1919		Juan Luis Sanfuentes
	Anselmo Hevia Riquelme	3 May 1919	9 July 1919		Juan Luis Sanfuentes
	Luis Serrano Arrieta	9 July 1919	23 September 1919		Juan Luis Sanfuentes
	Enrique Bermúdez de la Paz	23 September 1919	8 November 1919		Juan Luis Sanfuentes
	José Florencio Valdés Cuevas	8 November 1919	29 March 1920		Juan Luis Sanfuentes
	Pedro Nicolás Montenegro	29 March 1920	16 June 1920		Juan Luis Sanfuentes
	Federico Puga Borne	16 June 1920	1 July 1920		Juan Luis Sanfuentes
	Pedro García de la Huerta Izquierdo	1 July 1920	23 December 1920		Juan Luis Sanfuentes
	Pedro Aguirre Cerda	23 December 1920	16 August 1921		Arturo Alessandri
	Héctor Arancibia Lazo	16 August 1921	3 November 1921		Arturo Alessandri
	Ismael Tocornal Tocornal	3 November 1921	22 March 1922		Arturo Alessandri
	Jorge Matte Gormaz	22 March 1922	1 April 1922		Arturo Alessandri
	Armando Jaramillo Valderrama	1 April 1922	29 August 1922		Arturo Alessandri
	Antonio Huneeus Gana	29 August 1922	16 October 1922		Arturo Alessandri
	Luis Izquierdo Fredes	16 October 1922	21 December 1922		Arturo Alessandri
	Manuel Rivas Vicuña	21 December 1922	12 January 1923		Arturo Alessandri
	Francisco Garcés Gana	12 January 1923	16 March 1923		Arturo Alessandri
	Cornelio Saavedra Montt	16 March 1923	15 June 1923		Arturo Alessandri
	Carlos Ruiz Bahamonde	15 June 1923	2 July 1923		Arturo Alessandri
	Domingo Amunátegui Solar	2 July 1923	4 January 1924		Arturo Alessandri
	Pedro Aguirre Cerda	4 January 1924	1 February 1924		Arturo Alessandri
	José Maza Fernández	1 February 1924	25 March 1924		Arturo Alessandri
	Cornelio Saavedra Montt	25 March 1924	22 July 1924		Arturo Alessandri
	Pedro Aguirre Cerda	22 July 1924	5 September 1924		Arturo Alessandri
	Luis Altamirano Talavera	5 September 1924	12 September 1924		Arturo Alessandri
	Alcibíades Roldán Alvarez	12 September 1924	19 December 1924		September Junta
	Rafael Luis Barahona San Martín	19 December 1924	23 January 1925		September Junta
	Armando Jaramillo Valderrama	29 January 1925	27 August 1925		January Junta
	Francisco Mardones	27 August 1925	1 October 1925		Arturo Alessandri
	Luis Barros Borgoño	1 October 1925	2 October 1925		Arturo Alessandri
	Manuel Véliz	2 October 1925	23 December 1925		Luis Barros Borgoño
	Maximiliano Ibáñez Ibáñez	23 December 1925	20 November 1926		Emiliano Figueroa
	Manuel Rivas Vicuña	20 November 1926	22 February 1927		Emiliano Figueroa
	Carlos Ibáñez del Campo	22 February 1927	8 April 1927		Emiliano Figueroa
	Carlos Frödden Lorenzen	8 April 1927	23 May 1927		Carlos Ibáñez del Campo
	Enrique Balmaceda Toro	23 May 1927	5 June 1928		Carlos Ibáñez del Campo
	Guillermo Edwards Matte	5 June 1928	3 September 1929		Carlos Ibáñez del Campo
	Enrique Bermúdez de la Paz	3 September 1929	26 February 1930		Carlos Ibáñez del Campo
	David Hermosilla	26 February 1930	5 August 1930		Carlos Ibáñez del Campo
	Carlos Frödden Lorenzen	5 August 1930	13 July 1931		Carlos Ibáñez del Campo
	Juan Esteban Montero Rodríguez	13 July 1931	22 July 1931	Minister of the Interior and Social Welfare	Carlos Ibáñez del Campo
	Miguel Letelier Espínola	22 July 1931	23 July 1931	Minister of the Interior and Public Education	Carlos Ibáñez del Campo
	Carlos Frödden Lorenzen	23 July 1931	26 July 1931		Carlos Ibáñez del Campo
	Juan Esteban Montero Rodríguez	26 July 1931	27 July 1931		Pedro Opazo
	Luis Gutiérrez Allende	27 July 1931	7 August 1931	Minister of the Interior and Justice	Juan Esteban Montero
	Manuel Trucco Franzani	7 August 1931	20 August 1931		Juan Esteban Montero
	Horacio Hevia Labbé	20 August 1931	3 September 1931		Manuel Trucco
	Marcial Mora Miranda	3 September 1931	7 April 1932		Manuel Trucco
	Víctor Robles Valenzuela	7 April 1932	4 June 1932		Juan Esteban Montero
	Arturo Puga Osorio	4 June 1932	6 June 1932		Socialist Junta
	Rolando Meriño Reyes	6 June 1932	13 June 1932		Socialist Junta
	Arturo Ruiz Maffei	13 June 1932	17 June 1932		Socialist Junta
	Juan Antonio Ríos Morales	17 June 1932	13 July 1932		Socialist Junta
	Eliseo Peña Villalón	13 July 1932	1 August 1932		Carlos Dávila
	Joaquín Fernández y Fernández	1 August 1932	12 September 1932		Carlos Dávila
	Bartolomé Blanche Espejo	12 September 1932	13 September 1932		Carlos Dávila
	Ernesto Barros Jarpa	14 September 1932	2 October 1932		Bartolomé Blanche
	Javier Ángel Figueroa Larraín	3 October 1932	24 December 1932		Abraham Oyanedel
	Horacio Hevia Labbé	24 December 1932	7 May 1933	Minister of the Interior and Public Health	Arturo Alessandri
	Alfredo Piwonka Jilabert	7 May 1933	19 April 1934	Minister of the Interior and Public Health	Arturo Alessandri
	Luis Salas Romo	19 April 1934	26 August 1935	Minister of the Interior and Public Health	Arturo Alessandri
	Luis Cabrera Negrete	26 August 1935	12 September 1936		Arturo Alessandri
	Matías Silva Sepúlveda	12 September 1936	18 May 1938		Arturo Alessandri
	Luis Salas Romo	18 May 1938	24 December 1938		Arturo Alessandri
	Pedro Alfonso Barrios	24 December 1938	26 December 1939		Pedro Aguirre Cerda
	Guillermo Labarca Hubertson	26 December 1939	8 February 1940		Pedro Aguirre Cerda
	Humberto Alvarez Suárez	8 February 1940	30 July 1940		Pedro Aguirre Cerda
	Guillermo Labarca Hubertson	30 July 1940	23 December 1940		Pedro Aguirre Cerda
	Arturo Olavarría Bravo	23 December 1940	16 September 1941		Pedro Aguirre Cerda
	Carlos Valdovinos Valdovinos	16 September 1941	6 October 1941		Pedro Aguirre Cerda
	Leonardo Guzmán Cortés	6 October 1941	10 November 1941		Pedro Aguirre Cerda
	Jerónimo Méndez Arancibia	10 November 1941	10 November 1941		Pedro Aguirre Cerda
	Leonardo Guzmán Cortés	10 November 1941	21 November 1941	Interim	Jerónimo Méndez
	Alfredo Rosende Verdugo	21 November 1941	2 April 1942		Jerónimo Méndez
	Raúl Morales Beltramí	2 April 1942	2 April 1942		Juan Antonio Ríos

=== Interior (2025–present) ===
Minister	Start	End	Party	President
Claudio Alvarado	11 March 2026	Incumbent	UDI	José Antonio Kast

== Additional information ==
=== See also ===
- Foreign relations of Chile
- Ministry of Foreign Affairs of Chile

=== Sources ===
- República de Chile (1942). "VI. Poder Ejecutivo - Nómina de Gobernantes, Presidentes y Ministros desde la Independencia.". Manual del Senado. 1810-1942 (PDF) (in Spanish). Santiago de Chile: Imprenta Universitaria. (in Spanish)
- Valencia Avaria, Luis (1986). Anales de la República: textos constitucionales de Chile y registro de los ciudadanos que han integrado los poderes ejecutivo y legislativo desde 1810 (in Spanish) (2ª edición ed.). Santiago de Chile: Editorial Andrés Bello. (in Spanish)
