= Miguel Luis Amunátegui =

Chilean historian, politician and writer (1828–1888)

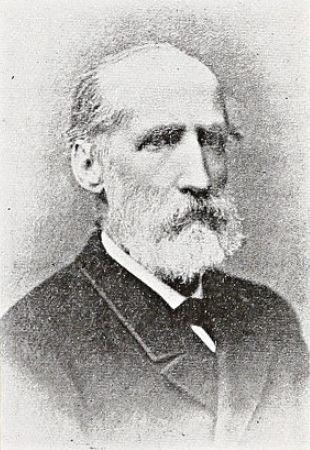

Minister of Foreign Affairs and Worship
- In office 28 June 1887 – 22 January 1888
- President: José Manuel Balmaceda
- Preceded by: Francisco Freire
- Succeeded by: Joaquín Godoy Cruz

Minister of Foreign Affairs and Colonization
- In office 20 August 1879 – July 1880
- President: Aníbal Pinto Garmendia
- Preceded by: Alejandro Fierro Pérez de Camino
- Succeeded by: Domingo Santa María

President of the Chamber of Deputies of Chile
- In office 6 June 1871 – 4 June 1872
- President: Maximiano Errázuriz Valdivieso
- Succeeded by: Belisario Prats Pérez
- In office 8 October 1867 – 8 December 1868
- Preceded by: Francisco Vargas Fontecilla
- Succeeded by: Francisco Vargas Fontecilla

Minister of Justice, Worship and Public Instruction
- In office 18 September 1876 – 5 August 1878
- President: Aníbal Pinto Garmendia

Minister of the Interior and Foreign Affairs
- In office 13 November 1868 – 2 August 1870
- President: José Joaquín Pérez
- Preceded by: Francisco Vargas Fontecilla
- Succeeded by: Belisario Prats Pérez

Personal details
- Born: Miguel Luis Amunátegui Aldunate; 11 January 1828 Santiago, Chile
- Died: 22 January 1888 (aged 60) Santiago, Chile
- Party: Liberal Party
- Education: University of Chile
- Profession: Historian; writer

Miguel Luis Amunátegui Aldunate (11 January 1828 in Santiago, Chile – 22 January 1888) was a Chilean historian, politician, and writer.

== Early life ==
Amunátegui was the son of José Domingo Amunátegui and Carmen Aldunate Irarrázaval, and was of Basque descent. He was the brother of fellow historian Gregorio Amunátegui Aldunate. At the age of fourteen, he lost his father, but General Ramón Freire became the family's protector, which the future historian deeply appreciated. He entered Chile's National Institute in 1840, where he became one of its most distinguished students. In 1846, he sat for his Latin examination under the great Venezuelan teacher Andrés Bello, who made him translate the poetry of Horace, a task he carried out with such care that it earned him Bello's affection.

== Public life ==
Amunátegui began to work as a private tutor and earned a professorship in humanities at the National Institute, in spite of not meeting the prerequisite age of 21 (he was 19 at the time).

In October 1852, he joined the University of Chile as a professor, and he began participating in the ministry of public instruction. He was immediately summoned by the university president to make a historical report that he would present. On December 11, 1853, he read the prologue of his book, The O'Higgins Dictatorship (Spanish: La dictadura de O'Higgins), which was published shortly thereafter and was one of the notable literary events of the year. A few years later he received the university's award for best educational report, for his book On primary instruction in Chile: what it is, what it should be (Spanish: De la instruccion primaria en Chile: lo que es, lo que deberia ser), in 1857. That year another of his books was also published, Condensed Political and Ecclesiastical History of Chile (Spanish: Compendio de Historia Política y Eclesiástica de Chile).

In 1849, he became a member of the newly forming Liberal Party and began to publish historical works in The Santiago Review (Spanish: La Revista de Santiago). He received his first prize for his work in 1851 for The first three years of the Revolution in Chile (1811-1812-1813 (Spanish: Los tres primeros años de la Revolución en Chile (1811-1812-1813)). In 1852, Minister of Foreign Affairs Antonio Varas commissioned from him a work to affirm Chilean sovereignty in the southern part of the continent in opposition to a recent work from Argentina, from which arose the title Titles of the Republic of Chile to the Sovereignty and Possession of the Southern extremity of the American Continent (Spanish: Títulos de la República de Chile a la Soberanía y el Dominio de la extremidad austral del Continente Americano), a book that had impact in Argentina and that produced responses and counter-responses on both sides of the Andes mountains.

In 1856, alongside other young intellectuals, he founded the Santiago Primary Instruction Society (Spanish: Sociedad de Instrucción Primaria de Santiago) with the aim of combating the high illiteracy rate (86%) in Chile at the time.

He was elected representative for the first time in 1863, representing Caupolicán's department, remaining in parliament for 12 consecutive years.

On November 13 of 1868, President José Joaquín Pérez called him to the Interior ministry, entrusting to him a conciliation program with sights on the 1870 elections. He presided appropriately over the elections and, as they suffered numerous defects, he requested that they be corrected in the departments of Copiapó, Freirina, Putaendo, and Cauquenes. The conservatives requested a vote of censure that was rejected by 44 to 33. With this, he left the ministry.

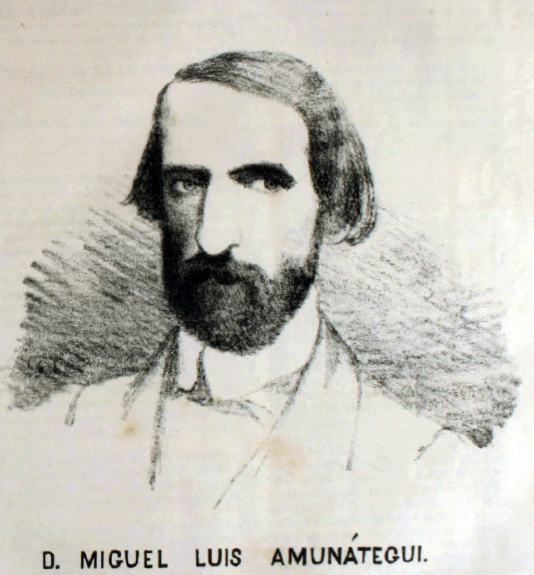
Miguel Luis Amunátegui.

In 1873, he was elected representative by Talca, and from his post there he fought, alongside Guillermo Matta, the educational policies of minister Abdón Cifuentes, who proposed changes to exams and where they would be held. He also supported an attempt to separate church and state the following year.

On February 12, 1875, he was proposed as presidential candidate at a banquet that was offered him in Valparaíso, but he declined the honor. In 1875, he returned to literary press, founding the Chilean Review (Spanish: Revista Chilena), alongside Diego Barros Arana.

in 1876, he was named minister of education . He published a decree named Amunátegui Decree(Spanish: Decreto Amunátegui) on February 6 of 1877, entitling women to take valid exams at the University of Chile so that they could opt for professional titles, under the condition that they be subject to the same conditions as men. It was because of this that in 1880 Eloísa Díaz presented an outstanding entrance exam before a committee including Diego Barros Arana and Ignacy Domeyko. During the exam, Minister Amunátegui awaited the committee's ruling in an adjacent room and celebrated with Díaz when she was accepted into the School of Medicine (Spanish: Escuela de Medicina), becoming the first woman in America to be received by the university.

In spite of so much work, Amunátegui found time to publish new works such as The Life of Mr. Andrés Bello (Spanish: Vida de don Andrés Bello), Historical Connections (Spanish: Relaciones Históricas), and The Earthquake of May 13, 1647 (Spanish: El Terremoto del 13 de mayo de 1647).

A representative for Valparaíso from 1884, he was shortly thereafter named minister of external relations. In this position, on 22 January 1888, he died of pneumonia. Faithful to his life's principles, he remained skeptical to his final hour, surrounded by family and friends.

== Works ==
- Biografía del general Borgoño (1848)
- La reconquista española: apuntes para la historia de Chile: 1814-1817 (together with his brother Gregorio Victor Amunátegui) (1851)
- Títulos de la República de Chile a la soberanía y dominio de la estremidad austral del continente americano (1853)
- Una conspiración en 1780 (with his brother) (1853)
- La dictadura de O'Higgins (1853)
- Biografías de americanos (1854)
- De la instrucción primaria en Chile: lo que es, lo que debería ser (1856)
- Compendio de la historia política y eclesiástica de Chile (1856)
- Geografia de la juventud de Sud-América: redactada según los mejores tratados modernos y muy esmerada en la parte relativa a las repúblicas hispano-americanas, principalmente la parte de Chile (1856)
- Juicio crítico de algunos poetas hispano-americanos (1861)
- Descubrimiento y conquista de Chile (1862)
- La cuestión de límites entre Chile y Bolivia (1863)
- Los precursores de la independencia de Chile (1870)
- La Encíclica del Papa León XII contra la independencia de la América española (1874)
- La crónica de 1810 (1876)
- El terremoto del 13 de mayo de 1647 (1882)
- Vida de don Andrés Bello (1882)
- Vida del general don Bernardo O'Higgins: (su dictadura, su ostracismo) (1882)
- Corona fúnebre a la memoria del señor Benjamín Vicuña Mackenna (1886)
- Acentuaciones viciosas (1887)
- Memorias científicas y literarias: lengua castellana: acentuaciones viciosas (1887)`
- Estudios sobre instrucción pública. 3 vols.

Preceded by: Francisco Vargas Fontecilla	Interior Minister and Foreign Affairs; 1868-1870	Succeeded by: Belisario Prats Pérez
Preceded by: Alejandro Fierro Pérez	Minister of Foreign Affairs; 1879	Succeeded by: Domingo Santa María González
Preceded by: Joaquín Godoy Cruz	Minister of Foreign Affairs and Cult; 1887	Succeeded by: Francisco Freire Caldera
