= Llico (commune) =

- Former commune
- Country: Chile
- Province: Curicó
- Department: Vichuquén
- Capital town: Llico

Population (1907)
  - Total: 8,430

Llico was one of the communes that was part of the department of Vichuquén, in the province of Curicó.

The 1907 Chilean census established it had a population of 8,430 inhabitants.

== History ==
The commune was created by decree of 22 December 1891, with the territory of Llico and Iloca subdelegations.

It was suppressed by the Decree with Force of Law No. 8.583, on 30 December 1927, by dictator Carlos Ibáñez del Campo as part of a greater political and administrative reform, adding its territory to the commune of Vichuquén. The commune was effectively suppressed on 1 February 1928.
