= Chile–Guatemala relations =

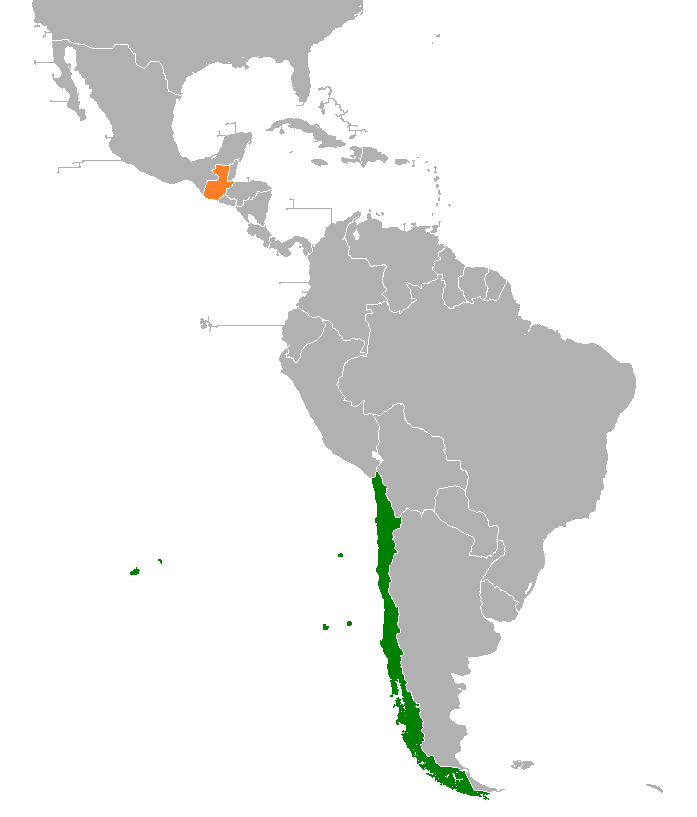
- Chile: Guatemala

Chile–Guatemala relations are the bilateral relations between the Chile and Guatemala. There is a stable and consolidated relationship between the two countries based on Hispanic-American brotherhood, strengthened by mutual presidential visits and through the signing of various agreements on technical and commercial cooperation, including a free trade agreement. Both nations are members of the Community of Latin American and Caribbean States, Organization of American States, Group of 77 and Organization of Ibero-American States.

== History ==
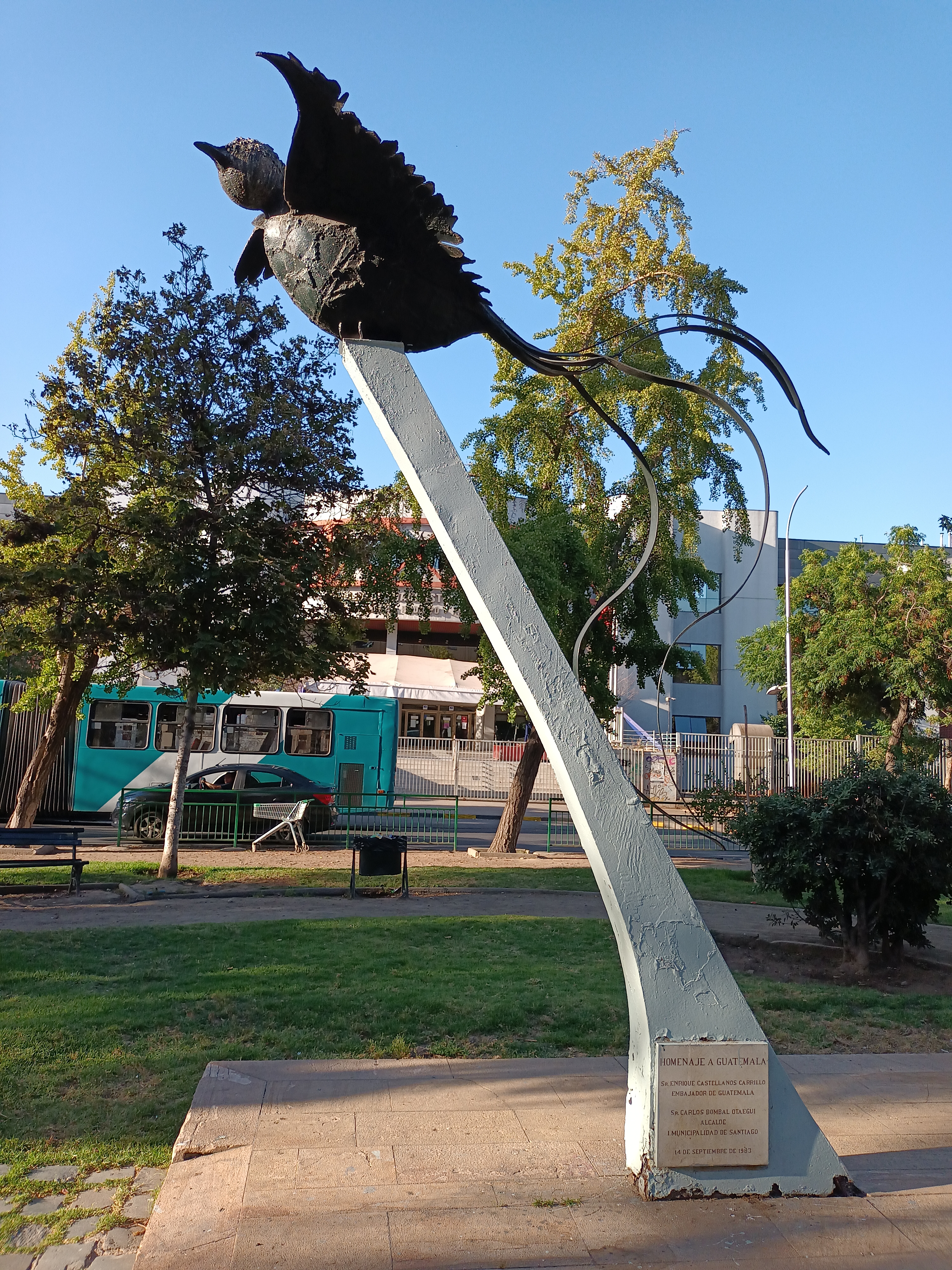
"Tribute to Guatemala," a monument erected in Portales Park in 1983 to commemorate bilateral relations.

Chile and Guatemala share historical ties, having both belonged to the Spanish Empire, being administered separately through the Kingdom of Chile and the Captaincy General of Guatemala, respectively. The oldest date on record of the beginning of Chilean-Guatemalan diplomatic relations, as sovereign republics, dates back to 1830, when the Government of Chile appointed Joaquín Campino as representative to the governments of Mexico and Guatemala, as extraordinary envoy and plenipotentiary minister. For his part, the first Guatemalan diplomat in Chile was Nicolás de Irisarri, who served as chargé d'affaires. Likewise, it is known that during the Pacific War, the Guatemalan government announced to the Chilean Foreign Ministry an "absolute neutrality" regarding the conflict, in response to the information contained in official documents found by the Chilean army that occupied Lima, which compromised Guatemalan neutrality.

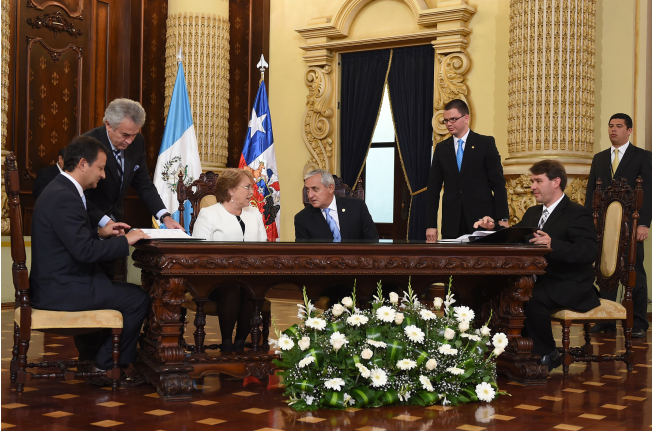
Signing of bilateral agreements between the presidents of Chile and Guatemala, in January 2015.

Since the 1980s, both countries have signed trade, cultural, diplomatic and environmental agreements. In 1983, the "Tribute to Guatemala" was erected in the Portales Park of the Chilean capital, a monument with a quetzal statue, inaugurated on September 14 under the administration of the mayor of Santiago Centro, Carlos Bombal. In 1997, an agreement was signed to create a Binational Commission for bilateral cooperation, which was followed by agreements on the promotion and reciprocal protection of investments, national defense, tourism, mining and air transport. In talks began between Chile and the Central American countries to negotiate a free trade agreement (FTA), which, after five rounds of negotiations, was signed on October 18, 1999 in Guatemala City. In 2007, an additional protocol was signed between Chile and Guatemala to the FTA, entering into full force on March 23, 2010.

In recent years, the main cooperation initiatives between the two countries have been developed in the areas of institutional strengthening and modernization, science, technology and innovation, public safety and justice, and human resources training. In 2018, Chile offered support to Guatemala to design a volcanological monitoring network, under the direction of the National Geology and Mining Service of Chile.

== Bilateral agreements ==
The first agreements recorded between the two countries are the Treaty for the Exercise of Free Professions (1907), the Convention Relative to the Exchange of Official Correspondence and the Exchange and Postage of Official, Scientific, Literary and Industrial Publications (1909) and the Convention on Diplomatic Bags, adopted by exchange of notes in 1937.

== Official visits ==
On January 30, 2015, Chilean President Michelle Bachelet paid a state visit to Guatemala, where she was received by President Otto Pérez Molina.

== Trade ==
The first commercial contacts between both countries date back to 1899, when the first Chilean-flagged steamer, owned by the Compañía Sudamericana de Vapores, arrived in Guatemala. That same year, Guatemala began to export coffee to Chile.

Currently, economic and trade relations between the two countries are governed by the Free Trade Agreement signed between Chile and Central America, and by the Bilateral Protocol between Chile and Guatemala of said FTA, which entered into force on March 23, 2010. Within this framework, the main products that Guatemala imports from Chile are paper, processed foods, fruits, wood, chemicals, bags, wines and medicines, while Guatemala exports to Chile mainly cane sugar, technically specified natural rubbers and preparations for animal feed. In 2013, Guatemala represented 0.2% of Chilean trade, with a total of 238 million US dollars. After the signing of the free trade agreement, Guatemalan exports to the Chilean market increased by almost 18%, considering the period 2010–2013.

In 2022, trade between the two countries amounted to 340.1 million US dollars, which represented an average annual growth of 5% over the last five years. The main products exported by Chile were oat grains, pine wood and chemical wood pulp, while Guatemala exported mainly cane sugar and rubber.

== Resident diplomatic missions ==
- Chile has an embassy in Guatemala City.
- Guatemala has an embassy in Santiago.
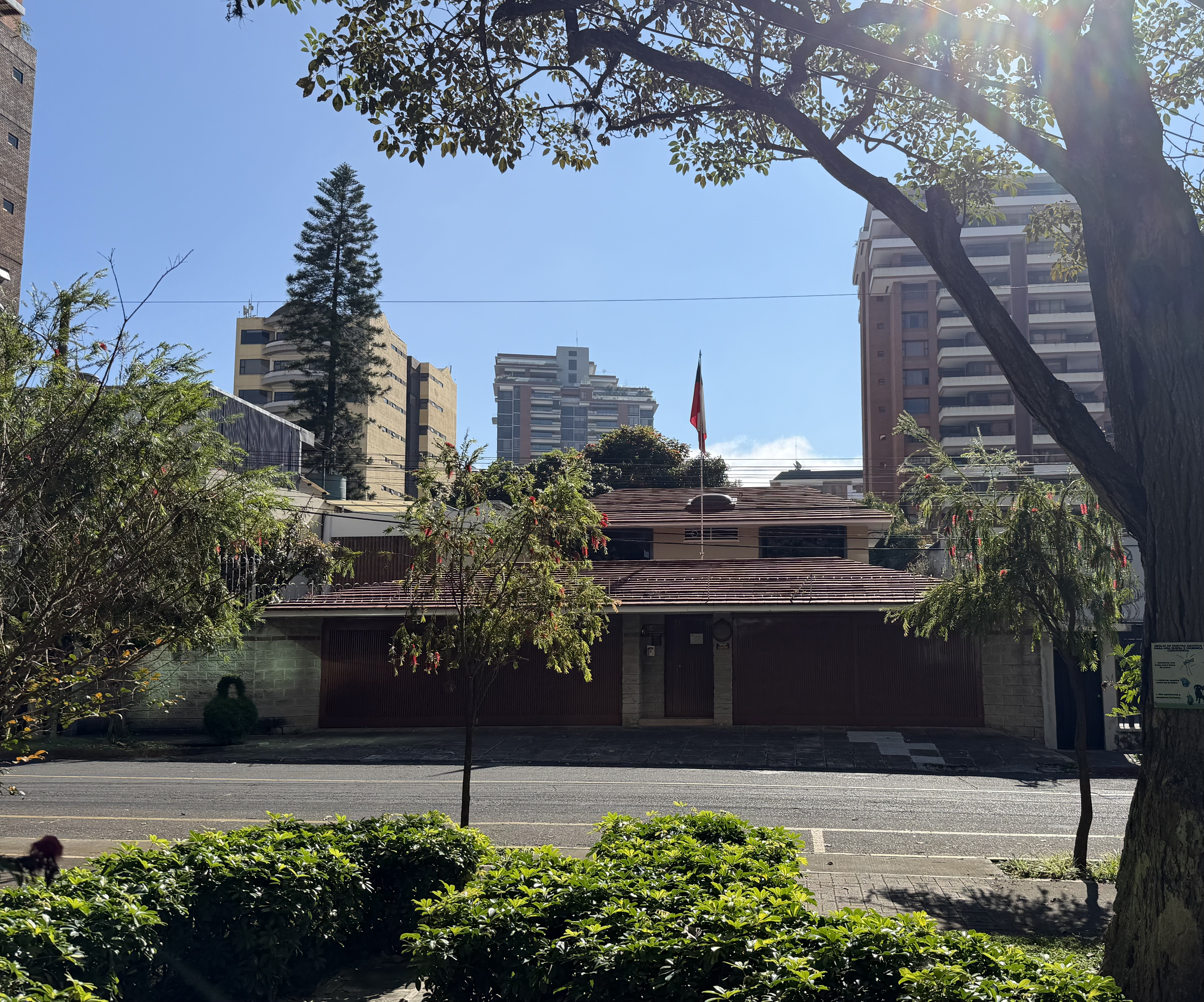
Embassy of Chile in Guatemala City

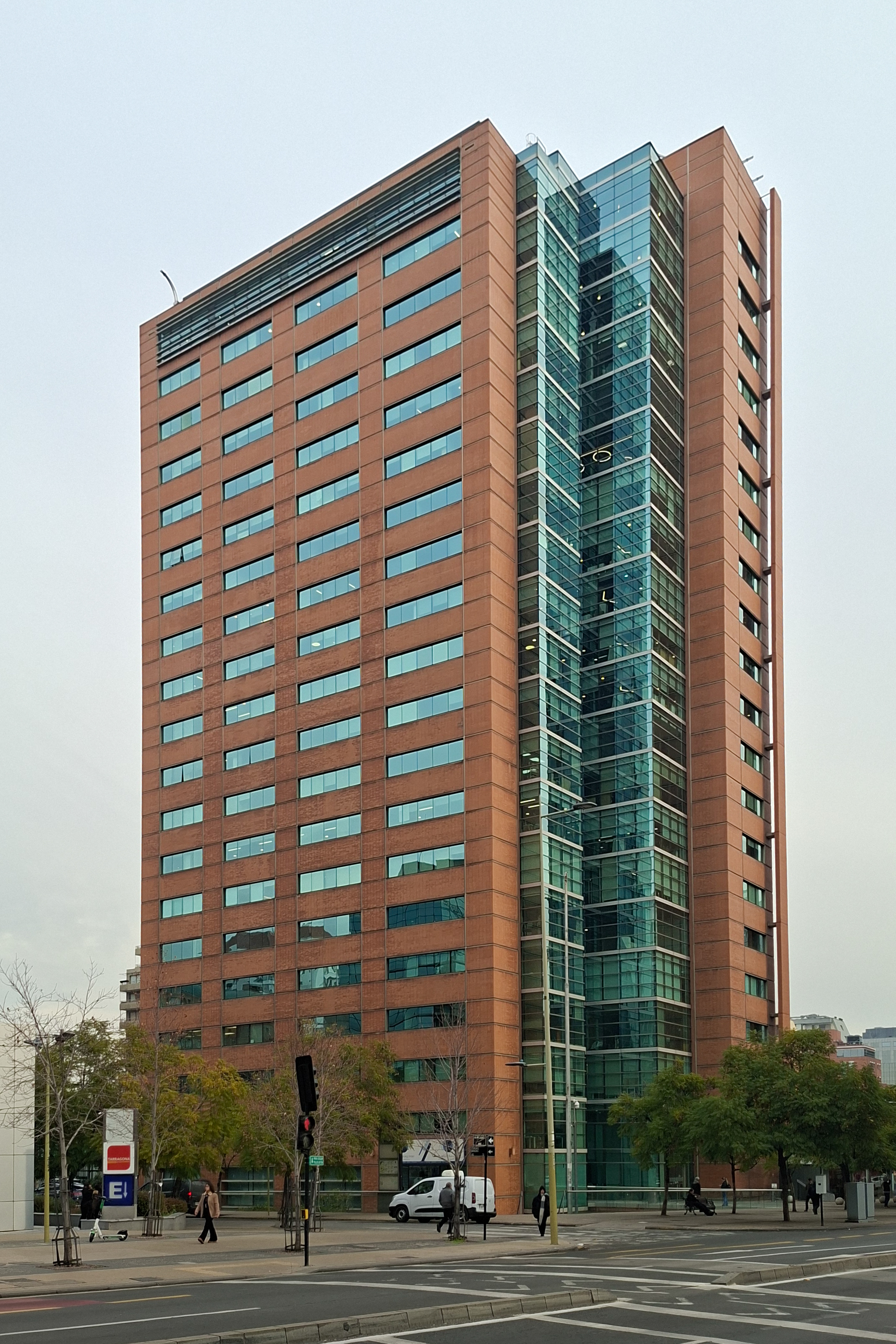
Building hosting the Embassy of Guatemala in Santiago

== See also ==
- Foreign relations of Chile
- Foreign relations of Guatemala
