= Antonio Varas =

Chilean politician (1817–1886)

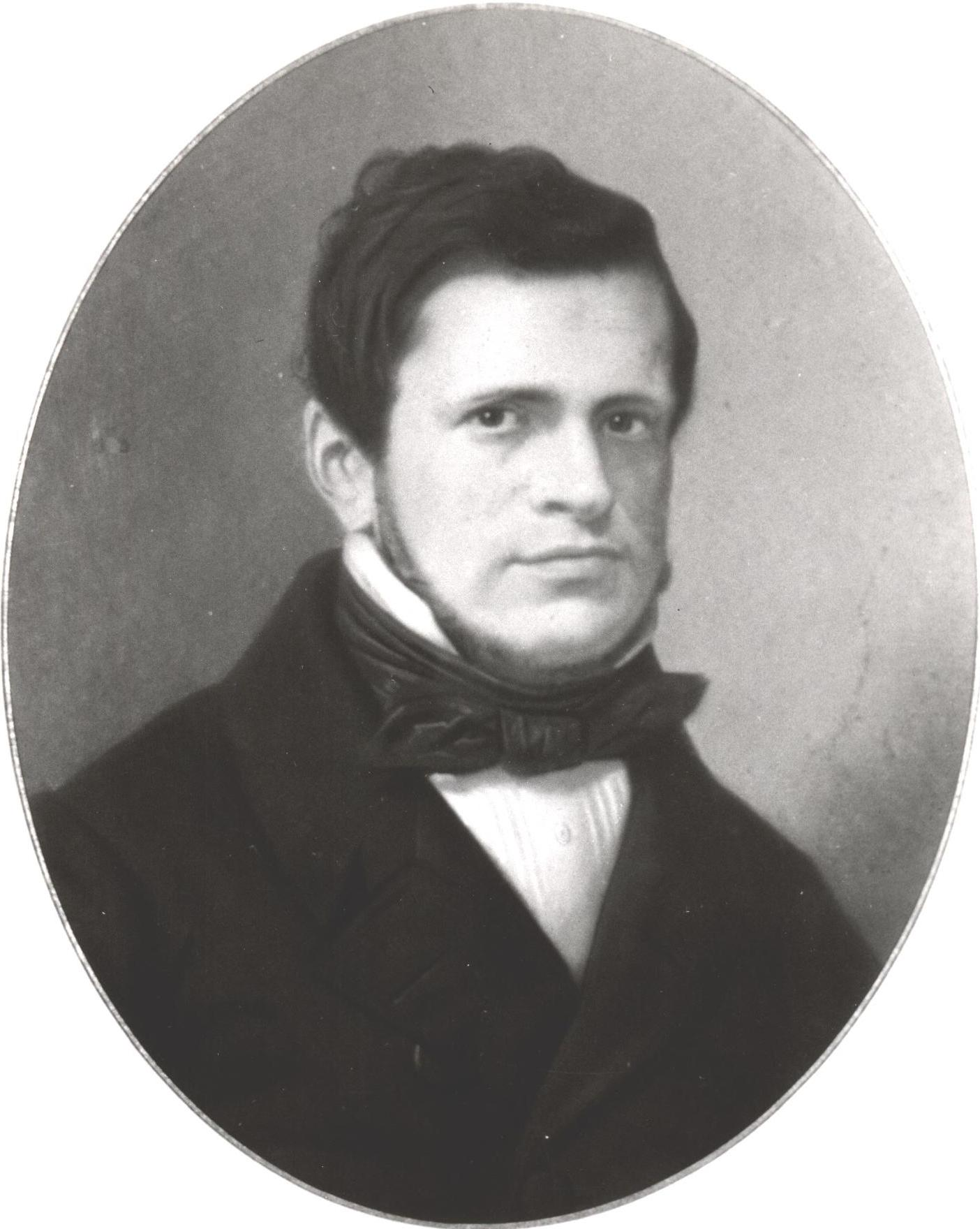

President of the Senate
- In office 4 July 1881 – 3 June 1886
- Preceded by: Álvaro Covarrubias
- Succeeded by: Pedro Lucio Cuadra

President of the Chamber of Deputies
- In office 3 June 1862 – 31 October 1863
- Preceded by: Waldo Silva
- Succeeded by: Jerónimo Urmeneta

Minister of the Interior
- In office 17 April 1879 – 20 August 1879
- President: Aníbal Pinto
- Preceded by: Belisario Prats
- Succeeded by: Domingo Santa María

Minister of the Interior and Foreign Affairs
- In office 30 April 1860 – 18 September 1861
- President: Manuel Montt
- Preceded by: Jerónimo Urmeneta
- Succeeded by: Manuel Alcalde Velasco
- In office 19 April 1850 – 18 September 1856
- President: Manuel Bulnes; Manuel Montt
- Preceded by: José Joaquín Pérez
- Succeeded by: Francisco Ovalle

Minister of Justice, Worship and Public Instruction
- In office 10 April 1845 – 22 September 1846
- President: Manuel Bulnes
- Preceded by: Manuel Montt
- Succeeded by: Salvador Sanfuentes

Member of the Senate
- In office 1876 – 3 June 1886
- Constituency: Coquimbo

Member of the Chamber of Deputies
- In office 1873–1876
- Constituency: Talca
- In office 1870–1873
- Constituency: Vicuña
- In office 1867–1870
- Constituency: Elqui
- In office 1864–1867
- Constituency: Santiago
- In office 1861–1864
- Constituency: Cauquenes and Constitución
- In office 1858–1861
- Constituency: Talca
- In office 1855–1858
- Constituency: Cauquenes
- In office 1852–1855
- Constituency: Curicó
- In office 1846–1849
- Constituency: Cauquenes
- In office 1843–1846
- Constituency: Chillán

Personal details
- Born: 13 June 1817 Cauquenes, Chile
- Died: 3 June 1886 (aged 68) Santiago, Chile
- Party: National Party
- Spouse: Irene Herrera
- Children: 7
- Parent(s): Miguel Varas Vallejo; Agustina de la Barra Alarcón
- Education: Instituto Nacional
- Profession: Lawyer, politician

Antonio Varas de la Barra (13 June 1817 – 3 June 1886) was a Chilean lawyer, educator and politician. He served as a cabinet minister under Presidents Manuel Bulnes, Manuel Montt and Aníbal Pinto, and held seats in both chambers of the National Congress of Chile. He was also president of the Chamber of Deputies of Chile and the Senate of Chile.

A close political associate of Manuel Montt, Varas helped establish the National Party in 1857. His public career included educational administration, legislation, banking initiatives and the promotion of German settlement in southern Chile.

Outside ministerial and parliamentary office, Varas participated in educational, financial and publishing initiatives. His work in southern colonization contributed to the establishment of settlements around Llanquihue Lake.

He was involved in the creation of the Caja de Crédito Hipotecario in 1855 and the Caja de Ahorros de Santiago in 1861. Both institutions formed part of wider nineteenth-century efforts to develop credit and savings facilities in Chile.

In 1884, Varas founded the Revista Jurídica, writing the entirety of its first issue, published on 15 November that year. The publication was discontinued after he became seriously ill in 1885.

Varas died in Santiago on 3 June 1886, while serving as president of the Senate and as a senator.

== Early life ==
Varas was born in Cauquenes on 13 June 1817, the son of Miguel Varas Vallejo and Agustina de la Barra Alarcón. His father had supported the Spanish monarchy, and the family's property was confiscated following Chilean independence. Through the assistance of his brother José Miguel, a philosophy teacher at the Instituto Nacional, Varas moved to Santiago to pursue his education.

At the Instituto Nacional, he studied under Manuel Montt and Buenaventura Cousiño Jorquera, both of whom influenced his education and early career. He qualified as a surveyor on 5 November 1839 and obtained his law degree on 17 August 1842.

In 1837, Varas began teaching philosophy at the Instituto Nacional. He subsequently held administrative positions at the institution, becoming its rector in 1842. His administration focused on improving educational standards and preparing students for responsibilities in public life.

In 1839, he participated in establishing the Literary Society alongside other teachers and contributed to the newspaper Semanario de Santiago. He also taught in the Faculty of Humanities and Philosophy at the University of Chile, which was founded in 1843.

Varas married Irene Herrera Bustamante, with whom he had seven children: Miguel Antonio, Carlos, Antonio, Luis, Rosa, Irene and Elisa.

== Political career ==
Varas entered the Chamber of Deputies of Chile in 1843, representing Chillán for the 1843–1846 legislative term. He participated in parliamentary committees dealing with justice, legislation, government, foreign affairs and ecclesiastical matters.

Under President Manuel Bulnes, he was appointed Minister of Justice, Worship and Public Instruction on 10 April 1845, succeeding Manuel Montt. He held the position until 22 September 1846, when Salvador Sanfuentes succeeded him.

In 1846, Varas was elected deputy for both Cauquenes and Ancud, choosing to represent Cauquenes during the 1846–1849 term. He also served as vice-president of the Chamber of Deputies between 2 June 1847 and 4 August 1848.

On 19 April 1850, Varas became Minister of the Interior and Foreign Affairs under Bulnes, succeeding José Joaquín Pérez. He remained in the ministry following the inauguration of President Manuel Montt on 18 September 1851, continuing until 18 September 1856, when Francisco Javier Ovalle Bezanilla succeeded him.

During this period, Varas promoted the settlement of German immigrants in southern Chile. On 10 October 1850, he appointed Vicente Pérez Rosales as a colonization agent responsible for surveying the area surrounding Llanquihue Lake and preparing settlements for immigrant families. These initiatives contributed to the development of the region and the establishment of Puerto Montt and Puerto Varas, the latter named in his honour.

=== Government of Manuel Montt ===
During Montt's presidency, Varas became one of the administration's principal ministers. In addition to his responsibilities at the Ministry of the Interior and Foreign Affairs, he temporarily held several other ministerial portfolios.

He served as acting Minister of Justice, Worship and Public Instruction from 13 January to 9 May 1855, acting Minister of Finance from 19 July to 3 September 1855, and interim Minister of War and Navy from 8 May to 18 September 1856.

Varas was also involved in legislation concerning banking, education and municipal government. In 1854, he introduced a proposal for municipal legislation intended to regulate local government and redefine the responsibilities of intendants and governors.

He supported the establishment of the Caja de Crédito Hipotecario, created by legislation on 29 August 1855 to provide financing for agricultural development. He subsequently participated in legislation concerning banking institutions and the regulation of banknote issuance in 1860.

In 1857, following a division within the Conservative Party, Varas and Montt founded the National Party, also known as the Montt-Varist Party. Its political programme emphasized the maintenance of public order alongside constitutional liberties.

Varas returned to the Ministry of the Interior and Foreign Affairs on 30 April 1860, succeeding Jerónimo Urmeneta. He remained in office until 18 September 1861, when Manuel Alcalde Velasco succeeded him at the beginning of the presidency of José Joaquín Pérez.

In 1861, Varas was considered as a presidential candidate by supporters of the Montt administration. His candidacy did not proceed, and José Joaquín Pérez subsequently became president.

=== Parliamentary career ===
Varas continued serving in the Chamber of Deputies during successive legislative periods, representing constituencies including Curicó, Cauquenes, Talca, Santiago, Elqui and Vicuña.

He was elected president of the Chamber of Deputies on 3 June 1862, succeeding Waldo Silva. The parliamentary record identifies Jerónimo Urmeneta as his successor on 31 October 1863.

During the 1860s, Varas participated in legislative debates concerning banking, civil liability and public education. He contributed to the Primary Education Law, which established a framework for state supervision and free primary instruction.

In 1861, together with Manuel Montt, he helped establish the Caja de Ahorros de Santiago, a savings institution that preceded the Banco del Estado de Chile.

In 1867, he was elected deputy for Elqui and participated in the Constituent Congress of 1870, which considered reforms to the Chilean Constitution of 1833. He subsequently represented Vicuña during the 1870–1873 legislative term and Talca during the 1873–1876 term.

=== Late career ===
Varas entered the Senate of Chile in 1876. He was associated with the representation of Coquimbo, although the parliamentary record also documents his decision to exercise a senatorial mandate for Talca during the 1876–1882 legislative period.

During the presidency of Aníbal Pinto, Varas was appointed Minister of the Interior on 17 April 1879, succeeding Belisaro Pérez. He served until 20 August 1879, when Domingo Santa María succeeded him. He concurrently acted as Minister of War and Navy from 17 April to 1 May 1879, during the opening weeks of the War of the Pacific.

Varas became president of the Senate on 4 July 1881, succeeding Álvaro Covarrubias. He was reconfirmed in the presidency in 1882 and 1885, remaining in office until his death on 3 June 1886. He was succeeded by Pedro Lucio Cuadra.

During his senatorial career, Varas participated in the Permanent Commission on Constitution, Legislation and Justice and served on several parliamentary recess commissions.
