= Francisco Vargas Fontecilla =

Chilean politician

Francisco Antonio Vargas Fontecilla
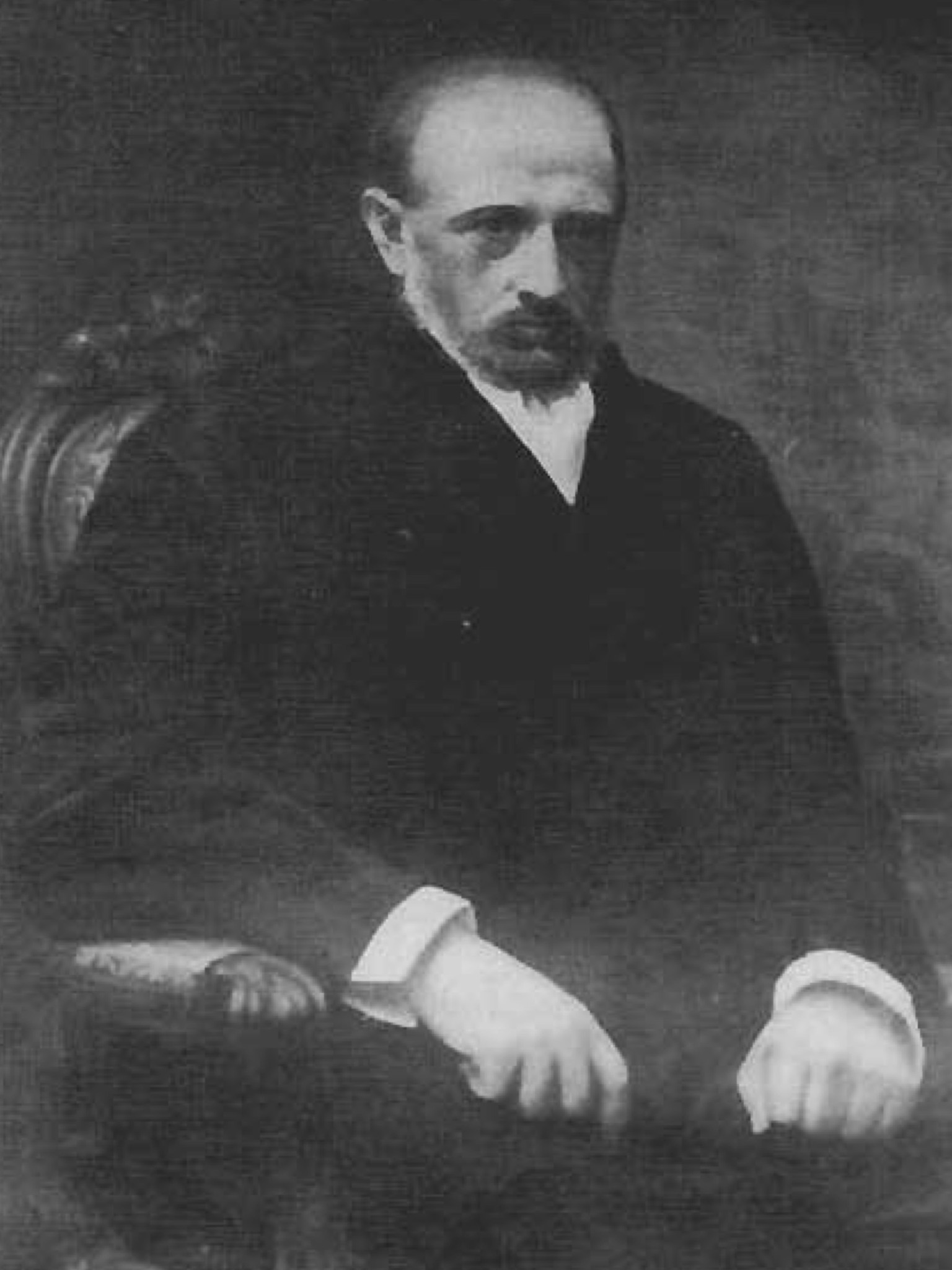

Deputies of Chile

President of the Chamber of Deputies of Chile

Personal details
- Born: Francisco Antonio Vargas Fontecilla; 27 April 1824 Santiago, Chile
- Died: 10 December 1883 (aged 59) Santiago, Chile
- Resting place: Cementerio General de Santiago, Santiago, Chile
- Party: Liberty
- Spouse(s): Rita Laso Errázuriz (m. 1858) Emilia Solar Valdés (m. 1866)
- Children: Rita Vargas Laso; Manuela Vargas Laso; Luis Vargas Solar; Casimiro Vargas Solar
- Education: University of Chile
- Occupation: Lawyer

Francisco Antonio Vargas Fontecilla (Santiago of Chile, April 27, 1824 - ibidem, December 10, 1883) was a Chilean lawyer and Liberal politician.

== Family ==
He was the son of Benito Vargas Prado and Manuela Fontecilla y Rozas. He contracted marriage in July 1858 with Rita Laso Errázuriz, from whose union two daughters were born: Rita and Manuela; and in 1866, in a second marriage with Emilia Solar Valdés, two children: Luis and Casimiro.

He studied at the National Institute, where he was sworn in as a lawyer on April 19, 1847 and five years later, in 1852, he entered the Faculty of Humanities in University of Chile.

== Life and politic ==
He was a member of the Liberal Party. He was elected deputy for San Felipe, Putaendo and Los Andes for the period 1858 - 1861. He was part of the permanent commission of Education and Welfare. He was once again parliamentarian for the aforementioned districts in 1864-1867 and was a member of the permanent commission on Constitution, Legislation and Justice.

He was commissioned in 1863, by the government of President José Joaquín Pérez, to elaborate a Draft Law on the Organization and Powers of the Courts, which concluded 1864 and finally became law in 1875.

In the following election he was reelected deputy, but this time by Santiago. During this last period, he presided at two sessions of the House, from June 4 to October 8, 1867 and from December 8, 1868 to June 2, 1870.

In his early days as a parliamentarian; President José Joaquín Pérez Mascayano appointed him Minister of the Interior and Foreign Affairs (September 1867 - October 1868) and later Minister of Justice, Worship and Public Instruction (April 30 - August 2, 1870).

Then he became a senator for Valparaíso (1870-1879), combining the permanent commission of Government and External Relations. He was dean of the Faculty of Humanities of the University of Chile. He was also minister of the Court of Appeals of Santiago (1872) and prosecutor of the Supreme Court (1882).

He published several works on Castilian grammar, and on Constitutional law. He also contributed to The Museum and to the Magazine of Santiago.

== Tribute ==
In the downtown sector of the city of Santiago de Chile, in the commune of Quinta Normal, at the beginning of the 20th century; a street with its name, Vargas Fontecilla.

== See also ==
- Andrés Bello
- Domingo Eyzaguirre
- Erasmo Escala

Preceded by: Alvaro Covarrubias Ortúzar	Interior Minister and Foreign Affairs; 1867-1868	Succeeded by: Miguel Luis Amunátegui Aldunate
