= Jerónimo Méndez =

Chilean politician

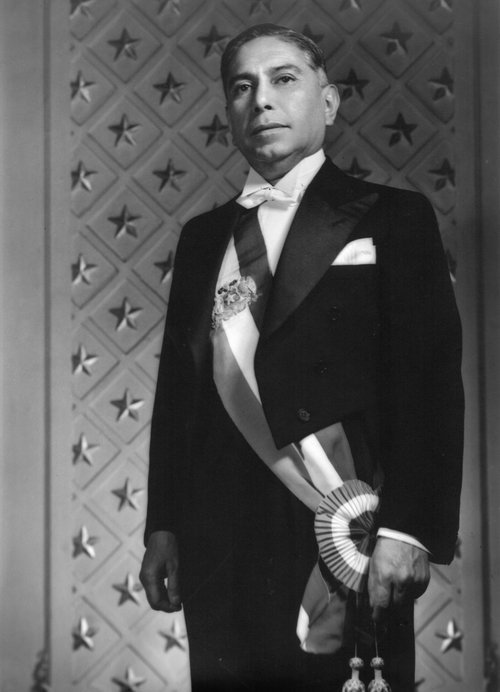

Minister of Public Health
- In office 4 February 1943 – 7 June 1943
- President: Juan Antonio Ríos
- Preceded by: Miguel Etchebarne
- Succeeded by: Sótero del Río

Acting President of Chile
- In office 25 November 1941 – 2 April 1942
- Preceded by: Pedro Aguirre Cerda
- Succeeded by: Juan Antonio Ríos

Minister of the Interior
- In office 10 November 1941 – 25 November 1941
- President: Pedro Aguirre Cerda
- Preceded by: Leonardo Guzmán
- Succeeded by: Alfredo Rosende

Personal details
- Born: 25 September 1887 Chañaral, Chile
- Died: 14 June 1959 (aged 71) Santiago, Chile
- Party: Radical Party
- Spouse: Amelia Toyos
- Children: Five
- Education: Universidad de Chile

Jerónimo Segundo Méndez Arancibia (25 September 1887 – 12 June 1959) was a Chilean physician and politician, and a member of the Radical Party (PR).

He served as Minister of the Interior during the administration of President Pedro Aguirre Cerda, assuming office as Vice President of Chile following the president's death in November 1941. He had previously served as mayor, municipal councillor, and senator representing Atacama and Coquimbo.

He was born in Chañaral, where he completed his secondary studies. In 1914 he graduated as an MD from the Universidad de Chile. President Pedro Aguirre Cerda appointed him Minister of the Interior. At the death of President Aguirre Cerda on 25 November 1941, he became provisional President. He called for presidential elections that were won by Juan Antonio Ríos on 1 February 1942.

== Biography ==
=== Family and education ===
Méndez was born in the Chilean commune of Chañaral on 25 September 1887, the son of Jerónimo Méndez y Rojas and Clotilde Arancibia y Carvajal. He completed his primary and secondary education at the Liceo de Hombres de La Serena and continued his studies at the School of Medicine of the University of Chile, graduating as a physician and surgeon in 1914 with the thesis Enfermedades de la vista. He subsequently specialized in ophthalmology and travelled to Europe for further training in the field in 1926, 1930, and 1931.

He married Amelia Toyos Reales, with whom he had five children: Hugo, Amelia, Eliana, and twins Raquel and Mario.

=== Professional career ===
Méndez began his medical career in Ovalle, where he worked until 1919. In 1921, he was appointed a physician at the hospital in Coquimbo, serving as its director from 1924 to 1945. Concurrently, he served as chief physician of the Workers' Insurance Fund in Coquimbo from 1930 to 1944.

He was a member of the Coquimbo Social Club and the Radical Club, serving as president of the latter for twelve years. He was also an honorary member of the Sociedad de Artesanos de Chile and an official of Deportes Magallanes. He also served as president of Línea Aérea Nacional from 1941 to 1942, director-general of the Directorate of Welfare and Social Assistance from 1942 to 1943, president of the Compañía Chilena de Electricidad, and a board member of the newspaper La Hora.

== Political career ==
Méndez began his political career by joining the Radical Party in Coquimbo in 1905. He served as president of the party's Coquimbo Provincial Board for more than eighteen years and, in 1946, as president of its National Executive Committee (CEN). He was mayor of Coquimbo from 1933 to 1935 and a municipal councillor from 1935 to 1938. In 1940, he was elected senator for Atacama Province and Coquimbo Province in a by-election held to fill the vacancy left by the death of Abraham Gatica Silva. During his tenure, he served as a substitute member of the Senate's Permanent Committee on Hygiene, Health and Public Assistance.

On 10 November 1941, President Pedro Aguirre Cerda appointed Méndez Minister of the Interior so that he could assume the vice presidency of the Republic during Aguirre Cerda's convalescence. After assuming the vice presidency, Méndez appointed his predecessor as interior minister, Leonardo Guzmán Cortés, to serve as acting minister. Following Aguirre Cerda's death on 25 November 1941, Méndez continued as vice president and presided over the late president's funeral.

As vice president, Méndez was responsible for calling a new presidential election. On 4 December 1941, he issued the decree calling the election for 1 February 1942. The election was won by fellow Radical Juan Antonio Ríos.

During Ríos's presidency, Méndez was appointed Minister of Health, Welfare and Social Assistance on 4 February 1943, serving until 7 June of that year. Later, during the administration of another Radical president, Gabriel González Videla, he served concurrently as acting Minister of the Interior and acting Minister of Foreign Affairs from 11 April to 8 May 1950.

Méndez died in Santiago on 12 June 1959, aged 71. The hospital of the Instituto de Seguridad del Trabajo in Chañaral was later named in his honour.
