= Agencia Nacional de Inteligencia =

National intelligence agency of Chile

National Intelligence Agency
- Agencia Nacional de Inteligencia

Agency overview
- Formed: 5 October 2004
- Type: Intelligence agency
- Headquarters: Tenderini 115; Santiago
- Employees: Classified
- Annual budget: US$8,917,357; CLP$7,065,223,000
- Agency executive: Luis Marcó Rodríguez, Director
- Parent agency: Ministry of the Interior and Public Security

The National Intelligence Agency (Spanish: Agencia Nacional de Inteligencia) is the Chilean government national intelligence agency. Created in 2004, its mission is to coordinate, and advise the President on, intelligence. It is attached administratively to the Ministry of the Interior. ANI's budget is approximately US$4 million.

== Background ==
The history of the Chilean intelligence services originates in the early nineteenth century, when a Military Secret Service was created to conduct special operations. Its most notable work was during the War of the Pacific, when it carried out several successful missions. These were recreated in a very popular military novel in Chile, Adiós al Séptimo de Línea, by Jorge Inostroza Cuevas.

The services were restructured when the Chilean Army was professionalised with the support of the Prussian army, creating the Dirección de Inteligencia del Ejército (Army Intelligence Directorate), or DINE. In parallel, the Navy and the Air Force created their own services (Naval Intelligence and the Intelligence Service of the Air Force).

During the military dictatorship of Augusto Pinochet, the Dirección de Inteligencia Nacional (Directorate of National Intelligence), or DINA, was also created, directed especially to combat the leftist parties and movements (Socialist, Communist and MIR). Its first director was Colonel Manuel Contreras. This institution was dissolved in 1977 to create its replacement, the Central Nacional de Informaciones (National Information Centre, or CNI), which performed the same tasks as the DINA. The CNI was dissolved in 1990.

== Organization and duties ==
The ANI was established by Law No. 19974 of 2004, establishing roles, rules, and the secrecy with which it operates. Its highest authority is the director, responsible for the exclusive trust of the president.

The agency, according to 2006 regulations, has a staff of approximately 125 people.

It is the legal continuation of the Directorate of Public Security and Information (DISPI, popularly known as The Office or La Oficina in Spanish) and the Intelligence Directorate of the Defense Staff of National Defense (DID), the Intelligence Directorate of the Armed Forces and the intelligence directorates or Headquarters of the Forces of Order and Public Security, or the Carabineros and the Investigations Police of Chile.

Its main task is to carry out work on political intelligence, as part of the intelligence system of the State of Chile, and complementing the work of the Military Intelligence Directorate of the Armed Forces of Chile and the police intelligence units of both the Carabineros de Chile and the Investigations Police of Chile.

According to the Chilean Government, the ANI does not engage in espionage.

Past directors include Gonzalo Yuseff Quiroz, and Gustavo Villalobos, who was also the last director of Directorate of Public Security and Information (Dirección de Seguridad Pública e Informaciones in Spanish). Luis Masferrer Farías resigned as director in 2019, and he was succeeded by Gustavo Jordán Astaburuaga until 2022. He was replaced by Luis Marcó Rodríguez.
