= Manuel Recabarren =

Chilean politician

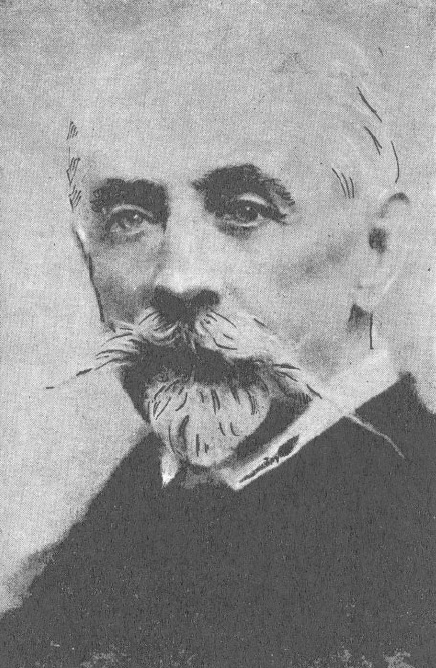
Manuel Recabarren Rencoret

Manuel Martín José Recabarren Rencoret (October 20, 1826 – June 5, 1901) was a Chilean political figure and liberal politician. He served several times as minister.

He was born in Santiago, the son of Manuel Recabarren Aguirre and of Martina Rencoret Cienfuegos. After completing his studies at the Instituto Nacional, he graduated as a lawyer from the Universidad de Chile on May 9, 1865. Recabarren was named teacher of Political Economy at the Instituto Nacional in 1842 and he married Carolina del Solar Marín in 1859, but they were childless.

He started his political career by joining the Liberal party and participating in the 1851 Revolution, during which he was captured and deported. He returned to Chile in 1862 and joined the staff of the La Voz de Chile (Voice of Chile) newspaper. On June 28, 1864 he was elected deputy for Illapel. In 1866, he became the secretary of the Fleet during the Chincha Islands War. President Aníbal Pinto named him Minister of the Interior, during which time he personally campaigned in the Arauco border to pacify a Mapuche rebellion and founded several forts to support the Malleco border.

Recabarren was elected a Senator for Talca, in 1879, then for Arauco in 1882, for Concepción in 1888, and again for Arauco in 1891, being reelected in 1894 and 1897. He died in Santiago, at the age of 75.

Political offices
Preceded by Domingo Santa María	Minister of the Interior; 1880-1881	Succeeded by José Francisco Vergara
Preceded by Ramón Barros Luco	Minister of the Interior; 1895	Succeeded by Osvaldo Rengifo
