= Congreso Termal =

Parliamentary elections were held in Chile in 1929. The elections were not free nor fair. The traditional parties in Chile worked together with the Carlos Ibáñez del Campo government to designate one candidate for each district. The goal was to prevent socialists from being elected into positions of power.
