= Manuel Rivas Vicuña =

Chilean politician (1880–1937)

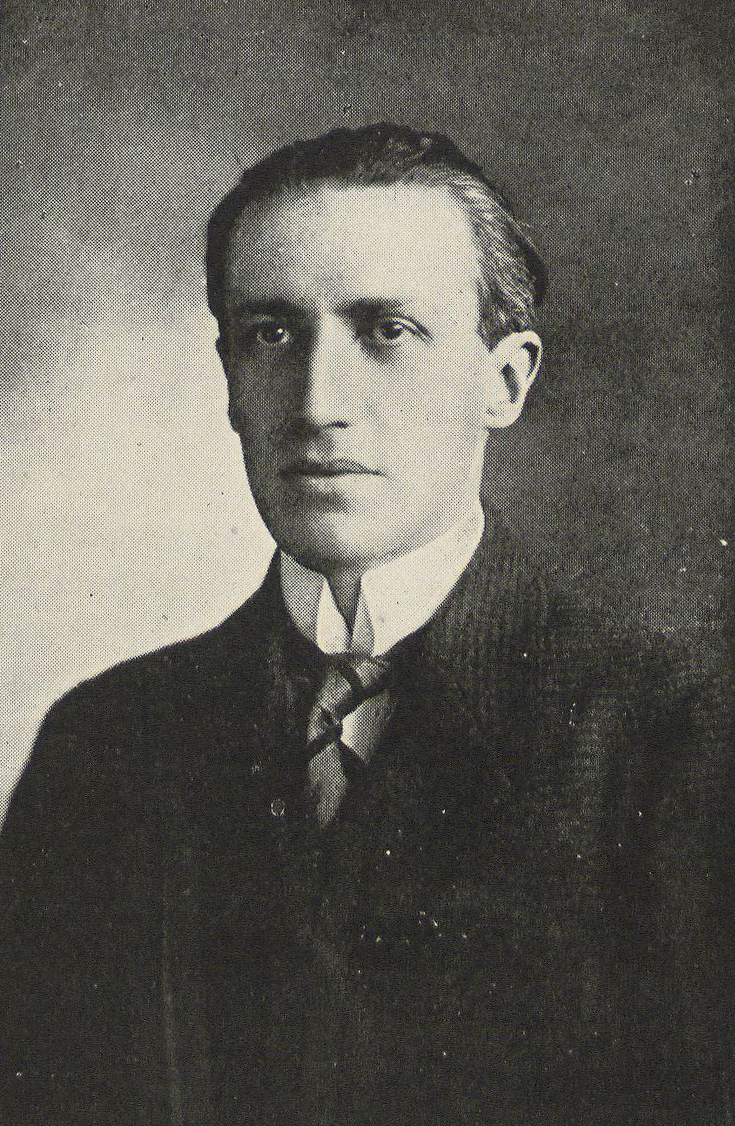

Ambassador of Chile to Italy
- In office 1933–1936

Ambassador of Chile to Peru
- In office April 21, 1931 – 1933
- Preceded by: Miguel Zañartu Santa María
- Succeeded by: Luis Subercaseaux

Minister of the Interior
- In office November 20, 1926 – February 22, 1927
- Preceded by: Maximiliano Ibáñez
- Succeeded by: Carlos Ibáñez
- In office December 21, 1922 – March 16, 1923
- Preceded by: Luis Izquierdo
- Succeeded by: Carlos Ruiz

Minister Plenipotentiary of Chile in Austria and Switzerland
- In office 1922–1922

Deputy of the Republic of Chile Representing the 11th Departmental Constituency, Curicó, Santa Cruz and Vichuquén
- In office March 1, 1915 – March 1, 1930

Deputy of the Republic of Chile Representing San Felipe, Los Andes and Putaendo
- In office March 1, 1909 – March 1, 1915

Secretary-General of the Liberal Party
- In office 1904–1907

Personal details
- Born: May 1, 1880 Santiago, Chile
- Died: August 4, 1937 Santiago, Chile
- Party: Liberal Party
- Awards: See relevant section

Manuel Rivas Vicuña (May 1, 1880, in Santiago — August 4, 1937) was a Chilean lawyer, writer, diplomat and liberal politician. Throughout his life he served as his country's ambassador to Austria, Switzerland, Italy and Peru.

He served as deputy for the communes of San Felipe, Los Andes and Putaendo from 1909 to 1915. Later he was reelected deputy for Curicó between 1915 and 1930.

He wrote the book Historia Política y Parlamentaria de Chile. 1891–1920. He was also the founder of the Society of Night Schools for Workers (SENO) in 1901.

== Early life ==
He was born in Santiago in 1880, the son of the couple formed by Ramón Rivas Cruz and Mercedes Vicuña Prado. He was brother of former deputy Francisco Rivas Vicuña; and cousin-brother of also former deputy Pedro Rivas Vicuña. In 1904 he married Eduvigis Gonzalez Edwards and they had children. He is the great-grandfather of writer Rafael Gumucio Araya and Chilean filmmaker and politician Marco Enríquez-Ominami.

He studied at St. Ignatius College; In 1897 he graduated with a bachelor's degree in philosophy, Humanities and Fine Arts from the University of Chile, where he also studied Law and graduated with a bachelor's degree from the Faculty of Law and Political Sciences in 1902. He carried out professional practice in the Third Civil Court of Santiago; and in 1903, the Supreme Court of Justice granted him the title of lawyer. He then began to work ad honorem, as a Justice of the Peace in the subdelegation where he lived.

== Political career ==
He was a member of the Liberal Party and appointed its Secretary-General in 1904. In 1903 he founded the Liberal Centre, of which he was president; the Liberal Assembly of Santiago, and similar institutions in the province. In 1906 he served as secretary general of the Convention that proclaimed the presidential candidacy of Pedro Montt and directed his electoral campaign. Also in 1906, he was appointed professor of Roman Law at the University of Chile, a chair he held for a month. At the end of the same year he went to Europe for private reasons, he toured several countries of the continent and returned to Chile in August 1907, the year in which he organized the Liberal Party Convention that was held in Santiago, in December. In 1908 he was proclaimed a candidate for mayor of Santiago and was elected.

In 1909 he was elected deputy for San Felipe, Los Andes and Putaendo, period 1909–1912; He was a member of the Permanent Elections Commission; that of Government and Colonization; and that of Public Instruction. In this period he was concerned with educational and social problems and presented bills in this regard. As a member of the Permanent Elections Commission, he presented an electoral reform project that was approved unanimously in the Chamber. Re-elected deputy for San Felipe, Los Andes and Putaendo, period 1912–1915; He was a member of the Permanent Commission on Social Legislation; and that of Public Instruction. He participated directly in the Election Law of 1914, which put an end to electoral fraud; He became concerned again with education, specifically in the project of compulsory primary education.

He was appointed Minister of Finance under the government of Ramón Barros Luco, on August 8, 1912—a position he held until April 8, 1913—and Minister of the Interior, on June 16 until November 17, 1913.

As minister, he was especially concerned with the reestablishment of Chile's relations with Peru; of finances; various public services were reorganized; he presented a plan for port works; inaugurated the works of the port of Valparaíso, approved the plans of the port of Antofagasta; entered into a navigation contract with Austria, approved unanimously in Congress. During his stay in the Ministry of the Interior, he was appointed by the President of the Republic, President of the Council of Ministers, from where he continued to strengthen ties between Chile and Peru; he reorganized the services under his control. He created the Drinking Water and Drainage Inspection; contracted the drinking water works in Santiago and other cities; program, debate and project for the reorganization of the police.

Re-elected deputy for Curicó, period 1915–1918; He once again joined the Permanent Commission on Social Legislation; and the Conservative Commission for the 1915–1916 recess; 1916–1917; and 1917–1918. The Chamber elected him State Councilor. In 1918 he obtained the passage by the House of the Compulsory Primary Education Law. He was again elected for the period of 1918–1921.

He was appointed Minister of the Interior under the government of Arturo Alessandri Palma, a position he held from December 21, 1922, to March 16, 1923. He was re-elected deputy for Curicó, period 1924–1927; joining on June 24, excluding Eduardo Errázuriz Larraín. Congress was dissolved on September 11 of the same year 24, by Decree of the Government Board.

President Emiliano Figueroa Larraín appointed him Minister of the Interior on November 20, 1926, and he held the position until February 9, 1927.

He was re-elected to represent 11th Departmental Constituency, Curicó, Santa Cruz and Vichuquén, period 1926–1930; He was a member of the Permanent Commission for Constitutional Reform and Regulations. In his parliamentary work, the agricultural credit project stood out, which served as the basis for the organization of the Agrarian Fund.

== Diplomatic career ==
During the government of Arturo Alessandri Palma, he was sent to represent Chile before the Assembly of the League of Nations; He attended the first three Assemblies, 1920, 1921 and 1922. In Geneva he interacted with the Peruvian Delegation and those conversations served as a precursor to Chile's diplomatic offensive in 1921, to seek a solution to the conflict. He represented Chile in the Labour Conferences of 1921 and 1922. He was a delegate to the Barcelona Communications Conference in 1921, where he obtained four seats for Latin America on the Advisory Committee. He also represented Chile at the Geneva Conferences on Traffic in Women and Children in 1921. In 1922, he represented Chile at the Interparliamentary Conference in Vienna, and at other international assemblies. The Council of the League of Nations appointed him a member of the Joint Armaments Commission and, within it, he chaired the first subcommittee in charge of studying the manufacture and trade of arms. And as the only Latin American representative, he asked the council to expand Latin American representation on the commission.

He was appointed minister plenipotentiary and envoy extraordinary to Switzerland and Austria. In Switzerland he obtained the exemption of consular visas for Latin Americans and helped Austria before the Council of the League of Nations, to reestablish its finances; and he achieved the union of Latin America with the aim of obtaining the admission of Hungary to the League of Nations. He returned to the country at the end of 1922.

He was a delegate and general secretary of the Fifth Pan-American Conference, held in Santiago. President Arturo Alessandri appointed him president of the Public Services Reorganization Commission and president of the Primary Education Council. He was the first manager of the reforms demanded by Alessandri and granted by Congress in January 1924, which is why his signature appears on the commitment document, even though he did not have any position at that time.

He also dedicated himself to journalism; His first works were published in La Nación in October 1917, under the pseudonym Segundo Jara; and in February and March 1918, with the name of Primitivo Rojas. Since 1923 he collaborated in El Mercurio, where he wrote opinion pieces. During the presidency of Carlos Ibáñez del Campo he was ordered to leave the country, due to his articles published in El Mercurio, which were censored. On February 25, 1927, he left Santiago for Valparaíso, where he embarked the same day bound for Guayaquil; but in Arica he was detained and there he was reunited with his wife and his eldest daughter. In March he went to New York City, where he was offered the position of deputy arbitrator in the claims courts of Germany, Spain and Italy, against Mexico, presided over by Miguel Cruchaga Tocornal, Chile's ambassador in Washington, D.C.; The interested governments accepted the proposal, and thus, he settled momentarily in Washington, D.C., where he met with his entire family. In October of the same year he went to Paris, where he accepted the position of president of the Mixed Commission for the Exchange of Populations between Greece and Turkey, offered to him by the Council of the League of Nations. He remained in Constantinople from June 1928 to January 1931. During this period he made four trips to Mexico and ended his work on the Mexican-German and Spanish-Mexican Commission; and in the critical period of relations between Turkey and Greece, he intervened as a mediator between both countries and after repeated trips to Athens and Ankara, he managed to establish the bases of the agreement, which was sealed with the signing of the Treaty of Ankara, in June 1930, among other treaties of peace and friendship.

He continued to collaborate in the press and signed the articles with the initials P.I.P., "Unfairly Proscribed Patriot."

After the fall of Ibáñez, under the presidency of Juan Esteban Montero, he was appointed ambassador of Chile in Lima, where he disembarked on March 8, 1931, in Callao and on April 21 he presented his credentials as ambassador extraordinary and plenipotentiary to the president of Peru, Luis Miguel Sánchez Cerro. From Peru he continued to collaborate with El Mercurio until 1932.

Apart from his collaborations in the press, he wrote books such as the Historia Política y Parlamentaria de Chile. 1891–1920; He began to write a novel, he had compiled other themes for another novel, and other writings.

He died in Santiago, Chile on August 4, 1937, at 57 years of age.

== Awards ==
- Order of Isabella the Catholic, Grand Cross (Spain)
- Order of Franz Joseph, Grand Cross (Austria)
- Military Merit Medal, Grand Cross (Hungary)
- Legion of Honour (France)

In addition, he was appointed corresponding member of the Spanish Royal Academy of Sciences and Arts and the Royal Academy of Moral and Political Sciences. He was also awarded decorations by the governments of China (Order of the Precious Brilliant Golden Grain) Cuba, Venezuela and Peru.
