= Carlos Frödden =

Chilean Navy officer and politician

Minister of the Interior
- In office 1930–1931
- President: Carlos Ibáñez del Campo
- Preceded by: Miguel Letelier
- Succeeded by: Juan Esteban Montero

Personal details
- Born: 14 May 1887 Coronel, Chile
- Died: 12 August 1976 (aged 89) Santiago, Chile

Military service
- Branch/service: Chilean Navy
- Rank: Captain

Carlos Frödden Lorenzen (14 May 1887 – 12 August 1976) was a Chilean Navy officer and politician.

He was born in Coronel, the son of Federico Frodden and Carolina Lorenzen. He studied at the Liceo in Lebu and at the Naval Academy, where he graduated in 1906, earning the silver medal, second highest award. In 1906 he was commissioned midshipman second class and made a trip around the world. Between 1909 and 1911 he was in the Patagonian Channels, doing survey work. He married Margarita Taborga.

He specialized in navigation and was later in charge of charting the northern coast of Chile from Caldera to Cabeza de Vaca Cape. By 1913, however, he was on board the Cochrane, where he completed the artillery course. In 1916 he became an artillery instructor; in 1917 artillery inspector in the squadron. In 1921 he was promoted to lieutenant commander and CO of the munitions depot at Las Salinas near Valparaiso. In 1922 artillery officer on the battleship Latorre. In 1925 promoted to commander, CO of the Silva Palma Marine Barracks.

In 1927, due to his friendship with General Carlos Ibáñez del Campo and his masonic connections (his brother Orestes Frödden was the chief of the Chilean Masons), he was named Minister of Marine (Secretary of the Navy), causing the displeasure of many of his superiors. Ibañez, however, later appointed him Minister of the Interior and promoted him to captain. When Ibañez left the presidency he was retired from active duty in the Navy as a captain.

Later in life, he went into farming. He held numerous foreign medals, was a hard-hat diver, and died in Santiago.

== Sources ==
- Genealogical biography

Political offices
Preceded by Juan Ortiz	Minister of Navy; 1925–27	Succeeded by Juan Ortiz
Preceded by Carlos Ibáñez del Campo	Minister of the Interior; 1927	Succeeded by Enrique Balmaceda
Preceded by David Hermosilla	Minister of the Interior; 1930–31	Succeeded by Juan Esteban Montero
Preceded by Miguel Letelier	Minister of the Interior; 1931	Succeeded by Juan Esteban Montero
