= Enrique Campino =

Chilean politician (1794–1874)

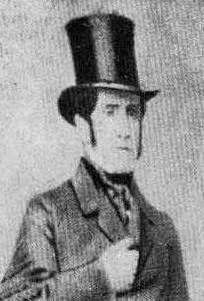
Enrique Campino

Enrique Campino (1794–1874) was a Chilean politician and soldier who campaigned for his country's independence.

== Early life ==
Campino was born in La Serena, Santiago, in 1794 and died on October 26, 1874. He was a Chilean military officer who participated in the process that led to the independence of that country in the early nineteenth century. His parents were Captain Don Andres Fernandez de Campino y Erazo and Magdalena Salamanca y Messía. In 1821, he married Dona Ignacia Landa de los Rios.

== Military career ==
He joined the Army in 1810 as a lieutenant of the Grenadier Regiment of Infantry. He helped quell the mutiny of Colonel Thomas Figueroa on 1 April 1811 (the Figueroa Mutiny). He participated in the campaigns of the south until 1812. After the Disaster of Rancagua in 1814, he emigrated to Mendoza, Argentina, joining the Army of the Andes. He fought in the Battle of Chacabuco in 1817.

In 1820, he participated in the Liberating Expedition of Peru with the rank of colonel and in the Chiloe campaign (1825–1826). In January 1827, along with his brother Joaquín, he took part in the so-called Campino Uprising. On 15 February 1832, he reached the rank of general.

== Political career ==
He was elected an MP for Santiago in 1826, 1828, 1829, 1831–1834, and 1858–1861. As an MP, Campino signed the 1828 Constitution. He was later mayor of the Santiago Province and a senator from 1861 to 1870.
