= Vicente Santa Cruz Vargas =

Chilean politician (1850–1910)

Vicente Santa Cruz
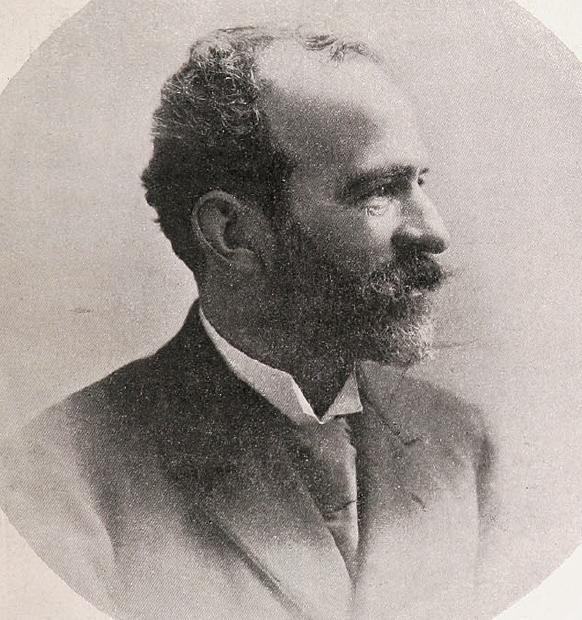

Minister of the Interior
- In office 1906–1907
- Preceded by: Javier Figueroa
- Succeeded by: Luis Vergara Ruiz

Personal details
- Born: March 29, 1850 Melipilla, Chile
- Died: 1910 Santiago, Chile
- Party: Liberal Party
- Children: 6, including Domingo
- Education: University of Chile

Vicente Santa Cruz y Vargas (Melipilla, March 29, 1850 — Santiago, 1910) was a Chilean soldier and liberal politician.

== Early life ==
He was the son of Joaquín Santa Cruz y Carrillo de Albornoz and of María Mercedes Vargas y Vargas. He was the brother of Senator Joaquín Santa Cruz Vargas and Ricardo Santa Cruz Vargas, Chilean war hero of the War of the Pacific.

He studied at the National Institute and at the University of Chile, where he graduated as a lawyer (1870). He taught Philosophy and Natural Law at the Liceo de Valparaíso, until he moved to Santiago to participate in politics, becoming a parliamentarian, jurist and diplomat.

== Political career ==
Deputy for Valdivia and La Unión (1882–1885) and for Chillán (1885–1888). In these two periods he participated in the permanent committees of the Treasury and the Constitution, Legislation and Justice.

He delegated a secret commission to Brazil (1886), managing to reestablish cordiality between both countries, also receiving the decoration of the Grand Cross of the Order of the Rose. He was Minister Plenipotentiary of Chile in Germany and Italy (1888).

He was re-elected as deputy, this time for Antofagasta, Taltal and Tocopilla (1891–1894). On this occasion he was a member of the permanent commission of Economy and Commerce.

He was minister plenipotentiary of Chile in Uruguay and Paraguay (1895) and in Peru (1896), a position from which he resigned in 1898 to retire from public service, dedicating himself to agricultural work. However, he was still called to be part of the government cabinet, as Minister of the Interior (1906–1907), under the administration of Pedro Montt.

Political offices
Preceded by Javier Ángel Figueroa	Minister of the Interior; 1906–1907	Succeeded by Luis Antonio Vergara
Preceded by -	Deputy for Antofagasta, Taltal and Tocopilla; 1891–1894	Succeeded by -
Preceded by -	Deputy for Chillán; 1885–1888	Succeeded by -
Preceded by -	Deputy for Valdivia and La Unión; 1882–1885	Succeeded by -
