= Joaquín Campino =

Chilean lawyer (1788–1860)

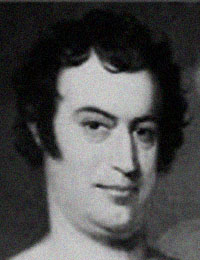

President of Congress
- In office 22 December 1824 – 1825
- Preceded by: Gregorio Argomedo
- Succeeded by: Francisco Ramón Vicuña

Minister of the Interior and Foreign Affairs
- In office 1825–1825
- Leader: Ramón Freire
- Preceded by: Francisco A. Pinto
- Succeeded by: Juan de Dios Vial del Río

Member of the Chamber of Deputies
- In office 1846–1849
- Constituency: Rere
- In office 15 June 1840 – 3 June 1841
- Constituency: Elqui
- In office 10 November 1824 – 11 May 1825
- Constituency: Coquimbo

Personal details
- Born: 16 February 1788 La Serena, Captaincy General of Chile, Spanish Empire
- Died: 20 April 1860 (aged 72) Santiago, Chile
- Education: Royal University of San Felipe (LL.B)
- Profession: Lawyer

Joaquín Campino Salamanca (16 February 1788 – 20 April 1860) was a Chilean lawyer.

== Biography ==
He was the son of Andrés Campino y Erazo and Magdalena Salamanca and did not marry nor have children.

He graduated as a lawyer from the Royal University of San Felipe (1812). He was Minister of the Interior and Foreign Affairs of the Directory of 1823, 1825 and 1826 (Directory Council). In 1824 and 1826 he was deputy for the province of Coquimbo.

On December 22, 1824, he was named President of the Congress. He made his name in politics and in letters as a journalist. In 1827 he participated in the so-called Campino Uprising and was minister plenipotentiary in the United States, and in 1830 in Mexico. He returned to Chile and in 1840 he was a substitute deputy for Elqui Province and in 1846–1849 he was a substitute for the department of Rere.

== See also ==
- Enrique Campino

== Bibliography ==
- Castillo Infante, Fernando; Cortés, Lía; Fuentes, Jordi (1996). Diccionario Histórico y Biográfico de Chile (in Spanish) (12th ed.). Santiago de Chile: Editorial Zig-Zag.
