= Domingo Santa María =

Chilean politician and president (1825–1889)

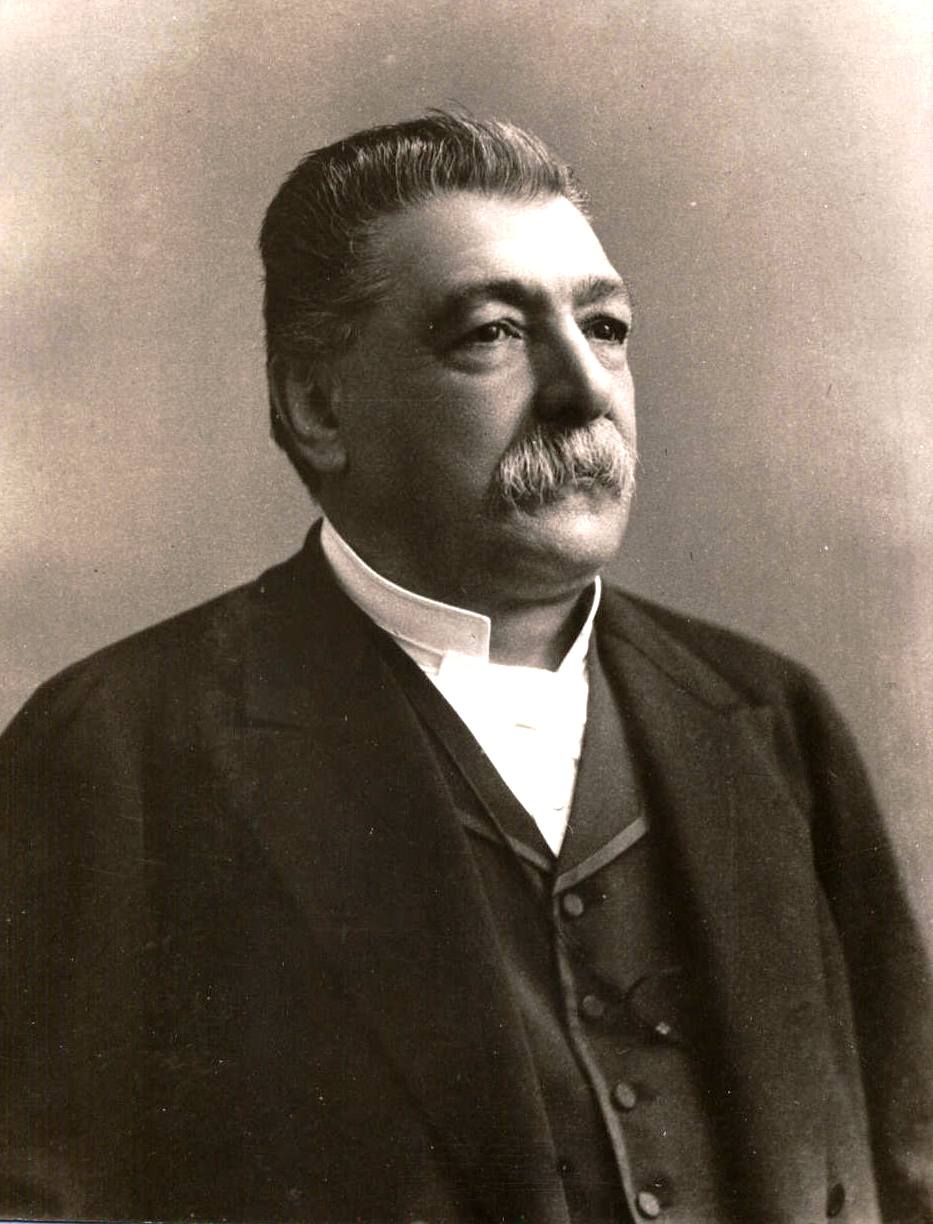

10th President of Chile
- In office September 18, 1881 – September 18, 1886
- Preceded by: Aníbal Pinto
- Succeeded by: José Manuel Balmaceda

Personal details
- Born: August 4, 1825 Santiago, Chile
- Died: July 18, 1889 (aged 63) Santiago, Chile
- Party: Liberal
- Spouse: Emilia Márquez de la Plata
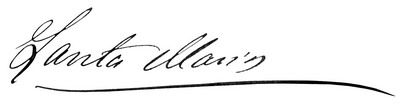
- Signature

Domingo Santa María González (Latin American Spanish: [doˈmiŋgo ˈsanta maˈɾi.a]; August 4, 1825 – July 18, 1889) was a Chilean political figure. He served as the president of Chile between 1881 and 1886.

== Early life ==
He was born in Santiago, the son of Luis José Santa María González and Ana Josefa González Morandé. He completed his early studies in the Instituto Nacional, and graduated as a lawyer from the Universidad de Chile in 1847. Soon after, he became a clerk at the Justice Ministry, where he rose to become Official Mayor. At the same time, he became the secretary of the Sociedad del Orden (Society for Public Order), a liberal club opposed to the conservative party.

== Political career ==
At the age of 23, he became Intendant of Colchagua. His active intervention in rigging elections in favor of the conservatives made him into the principal target of the opposition. Two years later, he was asked to resign by his superiors. His refusal sparked his destitution by Manuel Montt. At that point, he joined Montt's opposition and joined the liberal party, participating actively in the 1851 revolution. In 1856, during the clash between the government and the church due to the "verger problem" he joined the opposition to the church, a position that would eventually carry to the extreme during his administration.

In 1858, he was elected to the lower house of congress and a year later, he was forced into exile in Europe as a result of the 1859 revolution. After his return, he remained aloof from politics. He became an attorney of the Appellate Court of Santiago. During the Chincha Islands War, he became a champion for Americanism and his articles made him a public figure. After the war, he returned to politics as member of the lower house, raising to become vice-president of the chamber. He was also a diplomat and was named full member of the Appellate Court and a State Counsellor. In March 1879, he was elected senator. When the War of the Pacific broke out, he was named Minister of Foreign Affairs and soon after, Minister of the Interior. From that position, he had almost total control over the direction of the war and as such became one of the main people responsible for the victory.

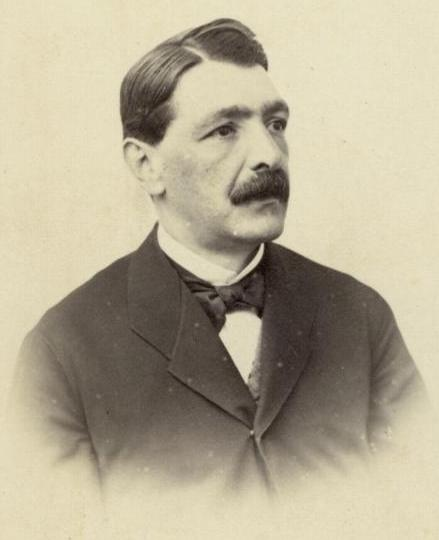
Portrait of Santa María in his youth.

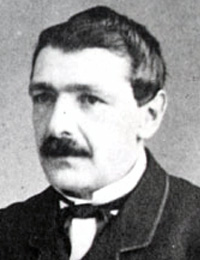
Domingo Santa María as deputy around 1872.

== Administration ==
President Pinto hand-picked Santa María as his successor. Although General Manuel Baquedano was also touted as a candidate, Baquedano's resignation left Santa María as the consensus candidate. He was elected president in the 1881 election, which the incumbent government intervene in to favor Santa María.

During his administration, he continued the War of the Pacific to its end. A few months prior to his presidency Chile had captured Lima and Santa María's administration forced Peru to sign the Treaty of Ancón (October 29, 1883), putting an end to war. Santa María also wrote the peace treaty with Bolivia in 1884, basis for the future peace Treaty of 1904.

In the domestic front, his main fight was against the power of the Catholic Church in Chile. He forced through congress the laws of civil marriage, civil registry and public cemeteries, all of which were functions formerly in the hands of the Church. His actions led to a break in diplomatic relations with Rome. He also concluded the Occupation of the Araucanía, incorporating the area into the territory of Chile. He centralized the railroads into a state holding, inaugurated the first telephonic line between Santiago and Concepcion, and introduced the first public electric lighting.

Santa María's presidency was also marked by increased electoral fraud and intervention in favor of the government liberals. In the parliamentary election of 1882, the conservatives refused to participate, except for Carlos Walker Martínez who was a candidate for deputy. The government went out of its way to prevent Walker's election and in a district with 20,000 voters there were 34,000 votes. The opposition did manage to elect a few anti-government liberals and radicals. In 1885, the electoral fight was much more violent and the conservatives were determined to oppose fraud. Fights between government supporters and detractors left many dead or wounded and there were numerous reports of votes being stolen by government officials. Santa María, far from denying he participated in fraud, openly admitted it. "I have been called authoritarian. [...] Giving away the votes to unworthy people, to the irrational passions of the parties, and even with universal suffrage, is suicide for a ruler, and I will not commit suicide before a chimera. I can see this well and I will impose myself to govern as well as I can and I will support as many liberal laws as are presented to prepare the ground for a future democracy. Hear me well: future democracy," he once said. On another occasion, he simply admitted, "I have been called an interventor [of elections]. I am. I belong to the old guard and if I participate in intervention it is because I want an effective, disciplined Parliament that collaborates with the government's work for the common good. I have experience and know where I'm going. I cannot let the theorists undo what Portales, Bulnes, Montt, and Errázuriz have done."

== Later life ==
He assured the election of his protégé and political heir, José Manuel Balmaceda. After he stepped down, he continued his work as President of the Senate. He died of a heart attack on July 18, 1889.

Political offices
Preceded by Aníbal Pinto	President of Chile; 1881-1886	Succeeded by José Manuel Balmaceda
Preceded by Antonio Varas	President of the Senate of Chile; 1888-1889	Succeeded by Adolfo Eastman
Government offices
Preceded by José Victorino Lastarria	Minister of Finance; 1863-1864	Succeeded by Alejandro Reyes
Preceded by Alejandro Fierro	Minister of Foreign Affairs and Colonization; 1879	Succeeded by Miguel Luis Amunátegui
Preceded by Antonio Varas	Minister of the Interior; 1879-1880	Succeeded by Manuel Recabarren
