= Carlos Ibáñez del Campo =

19th and 25th President of Chile (1927–31, 1952–58)

General Carlos Ibáñez del Campo OMCh
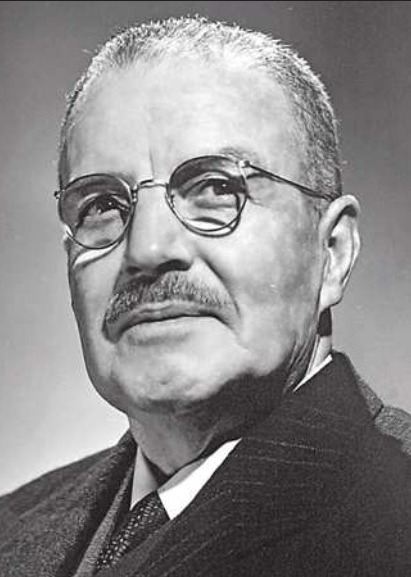
- Ibáñez in 1953

20th and 26th President of Chile
- In office 3 November 1952 – 3 November 1958
- Preceded by: Gabriel González Videla
- Succeeded by: Jorge Alessandri Rodríguez
- In office 21 July 1927 – 26 July 1931
- Preceded by: Emiliano Figueroa Larraín
- Succeeded by: Pedro Opazo Letelier

Minister of the Interior
- In office 9 February 1927 – 7 April 1927
- President: Emiliano Figueroa
- Preceded by: Manuel Rivas Vicuña
- Succeeded by: Carlos Frödden

Minister of War and Navy
- In office 25 January 1925 – 25 February 1927
- President: Arturo Alessandri; Luis Barros Borgoño (acting); Emiliano Figueroa
- Preceded by: Juan Emilio Ortiz Vega
- Succeeded by: Juan Emilio Ortiz Vega

Personal details
- Born: 3 November 1877 Linares, Chile
- Died: 28 April 1960 (aged 82) Santiago, Chile
- Resting place: Santiago General Cemetery
- Party: Independent
- Spouses: Rosa Quiroz de Ávila; Graciela Letelier Velasco

Military service
- Branch: Chilean Army
- Service years: 1898–1924
- Rank: Lieutenant Colonel

Carlos Ibáñez del Campo (Latin American Spanish: [ˈkaɾlos iˈβaɲes ðel ˈkampo]; 3 November 1877 – 28 April 1960) was a Chilean Army officer and political figure. He served as president twice, first between 1927 and 1931, and then from 1952 to 1958, serving for 10 years in office.

== Early life ==
Carlos Ibáñez del Campo was born to Francisco Ibáñez and María Nieves del Campo. On his father's side, his family descended from the Irish captain, John Augustine Evans, a native of Galway, who arrived in Chile in 1730 after the shipwreck of HMS Wager on the island of the same name, and who Hispanicized his surname. Captain Evans contacted Ambrosio O'Higgins, Governor of Linares, who entrusted him with the administration of the Royal Treasury of Perquilauquén. Ibáñez's ancestors include members of the Alvarado family of Spanish conquistadors. He was a direct descendant of García de Alvarado. On his maternal side, he is descended from the Frenchman Giles Du Champ, who arrived in Chile in 1700 and settled in Concepción. He was a captain in the Kingdom's Foreign Regiment. His descendants Hispanicized the surname to del Campo. His grandfather, Manuel del Campo y Vásquez, was a wealthy landowner in Linares.

During Ibáñez's childhood, he lived on the San Francisco estate, owned by his father (in Vega de Ancoa), and organized the first peasant center in that city. His younger brother, Javier, was also a soldier and politician, a member of the Democratic Party.

In 1889, he entered the Linares Public School and later went on to the Linares Boys' Lyceum, where he met Rogelio Cuéllar, who directed the boys' school and was a mathematics teacher. Cuéllar was the one who recommended him to enter the Military School. On March 12, 1896 he entered the second year of the Military School.

Ibáñez was staunchly anti-communist.

== The coups of 1924 and 1925 ==
The presidency of Arturo Alessandri saw a rise in popular discontent over an inefficient government. In 1924, the Chilean armed forces, led by General Luis Altamirano, began the saber-rattling (ruido de sables), a protest where soldiers banged their sabers against the floor of the Congress. Amid threats from the armed forces, Alessandri decided he could no longer govern and submitted his resignation. Although this resignation was not approved by Congress, Alessandri left the country and Altamirano established a military junta.

However, another faction of the armed forces, led by Colonel Marmaduke Grove and Lieutenant Colonel Ibáñez, decided the junta's reforms did not go far enough in ending the government's inefficiency. They led another coup, deposed Altamirano, and established a new junta with Emilio Bello Codesido as head. Ibáñez and Grove, the powers behind the scene, agreed to ask Alessandri to return and complete his term.

== Minister of War and Home Affairs ==
Alessandri returned in 1925 and drafted a new constitution which was designed to decrease the powers of the legislature, thereby making government more effective. Ibáñez was named Minister of War and later Home Affairs Minister. However, Alessandri decided Ibáñez was becoming too ambitious, and some ridiculed Alessandri as a pawn of Ibáñez. In response, Alessandri resigned once more and went into exile. Ibáñez announced his candidacy in the upcoming presidential elections, but the three main Chilean political parties (Conservative, Liberal, Radical) pressured him to desist. The three parties then presented a consensus choice, Emiliano Figueroa Larraín, to be the sole presidential candidate, in order to avoid political campaigning in the volatile political atmosphere. Nevertheless, Ibáñez's closest adviser, leftist José Santos Salas, later declared his presidential candidacy, and a number of people suspected it was with Ibáñez's backing.

Figueroa triumphed with 71% of the vote, but kept Ibáñez as home affairs minister. Ibáñez was able to control the weak Figueroa who decided to resign in 1927 rather than be Ibáñez's puppet. Because he was home affairs minister, under the Chilean constitution, Ibáñez became vice president and announced elections for 22 May that year. In the presidential elections, the traditional political parties decided not to participate. Ibáñez's only opponent was the communist Elías Lafertte, who was exiled in the Juan Fernández Archipelago throughout the electoral campaign. Ibáñez won the election with 98% of the vote.

== First presidency ==
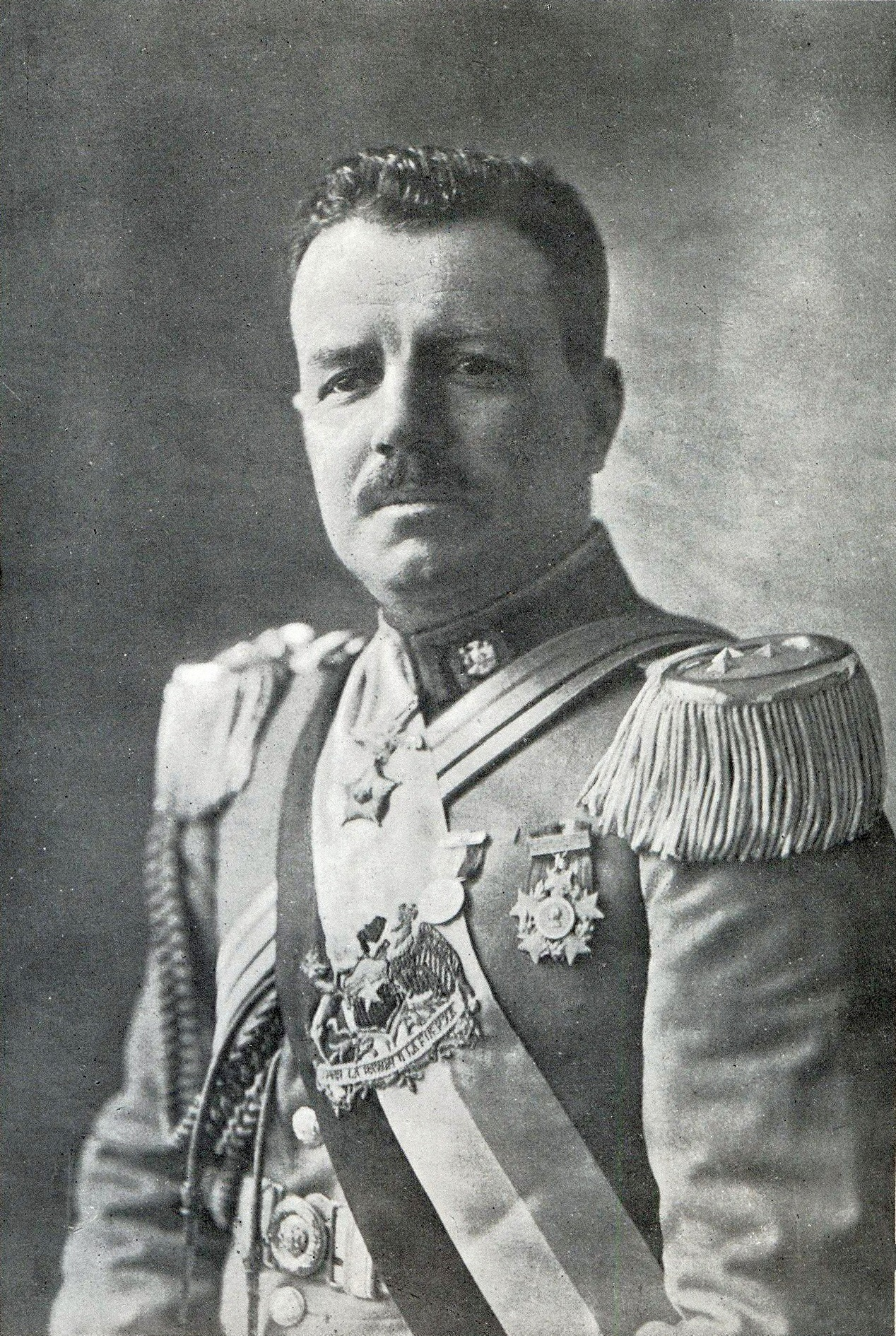
Ibáñez during his first presidency

As president, Ibáñez exerted dictatorial powers, extensively ruling by decree (issuing decretos con fuerza de ley, decrees with force of law ), suspending parliamentary elections and instead naming politicians to the Senate and Chamber of Deputies himself. Further, political opponents were arrested and exiled, including his former ally Marmaduke Grove. According to historian Clarence Haring, Ibáñez's government "was not wholly a dictatorship nor yet was it constitutional; it was something of both, sometimes in harmony, sometimes at odds, with public sentiment." According to Frederick Nunn, "Ibáñez paid only lip service to civil liberties and democratic procedures of governance embodied in the same document. He was not a true dictator, but a rigid authoritarian, elevated to power constitutionally, who had grave doubts about traditional liberal democracy and constitutionalism."

Social legislation was also introduced under his presidency. In May 1931, a decree was issued that introduced a weekly rest for the staff of public slaughterhouses. He approved two International Labour Organization conventions that dealt with health insurance for domestic servants and commercial and industrial employees, in addition to enactng regulations safeguarding against occupational hazards. A public agency was also enabled by Ibáñez (as noted by one study) "to insure workers in competition with employer's mutual insurance companies and commercial insurance." In addition, all of the labor legislation of that period was compiled into Latin America's first labor code.

He worked with the traditional parties in Chile to prevent the 1929 Chilean parliamentary election from being contested by socialists, by ensuring a single, shared designated a candidate for each district.

His popularity lasted until after the Wall Street crash of 1929. At that point all loans were halted and called. Chile was heavily affected by the Great Depression, which led to a drastic decline in the value of Chilean exports; for example, the value of copper and nitrate exports declined by 89% from 1927–29 to 1932. Ibáñez's large public spending did nothing to alleviate the situation, and his opponents, primarily the exiled Grove and Alessandri, began to plan a comeback.

During July 1931, there were large protests against the government. Student protesters declared a four-day general strike and occupied university buildings at the National University. Rioting began on July 23. Protesters and police suffered violence, with approximately 20 deaths, as well as 200 injured. The police shooting of a physician in front of the building of the Medical Society led physicians to declare a physician strike. Ibáñez left the country for exile, on July 26, 1931, after delegating his office to the president of the senate, Pedro Opazo, who in turn resigned in favor of the interior minister, Juan Esteban Montero.

== Between presidencies ==
Chile did not reach political stability until the 1932 reelection of Arturo Alessandri, whose economic policies managed to alleviate the depression. He ran for president again in the 1942 election, but lost to Juan Antonio Rios.

== Return to the Presidency ==
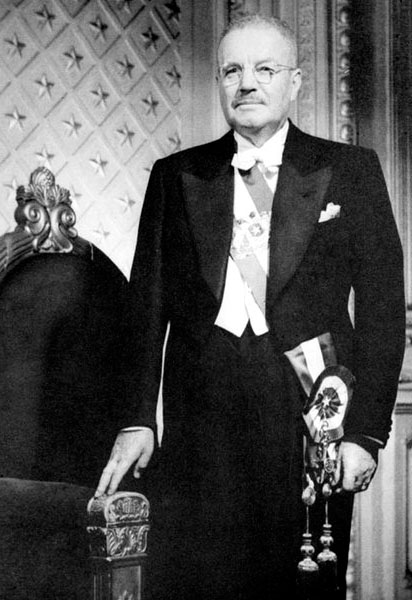
Ibáñez during his second presidency

In the 1952 presidential elections, the right-wing Agrarian Labor Party (Partido Agrario Laborista) declared Ibáñez a presidential candidate. Ibáñez also garnered the support of the left-wing Popular Socialist Party and some feminist political unions – the feminist María de la Cruz was his campaign manager, but she then refused a ministerial office. Ibáñez promised to "sweep" out political corruption and bad government with his "broom" and was nicknamed the "General of Hope". He criticized traditional political parties but was vague in his proposals and had no clear position in the political spectrum. He won the election with 47%.

The Bolivian National Revolution of 1952 influenced the followers of Ibáñez who saw it as a model of the national-populism they sought to implement in Chile.

His second term was a modest success. By that time he was already old and ailing, and he left government mostly to his cabinet. His major problems during his presidency were those concerned with the economy. He had no plan to control inflation – one of the most pressing economic problems at the time in Chile – and as a result it skyrocketed to 71% in 1954 and 83% in 1955. Helped by the Klein-Sacks mission, Ibáñez managed to reduce it to 33% when he left the presidency. During his term, public transport costs rose by 50% and economic growth fell to 2.5%.

Now much more of a centrist politically, Ibáñez won the support of left-wingers by repealing the Law for the Defense of Democracy, which banned the Communist Party. He did also take a softer approach on crime than in his first presidency. For example, he commuted the death sentence for the Jackal of Pupunahue to life imprisonment.

Some Chileans continued to support an Ibáñez dictatorship. These ibañistas, most of whom were retired army officers, created the "Línea Recta" (Straight Line) group to establish a new dictatorship. Ibáñez met with these conspirators, but ultimately his typical lack of trust ended the plans for a self-coup. A scandal rocked the Ibáñez administration when the press revealed Ibáñez's meetings with these conspirators.

== Retirement and legacy ==
Ibáñez was succeeded by Jorge Alessandri Rodriguez, the son of his archenemy Arturo Alessandri. He abandoned politics and died in Santiago in 1960. As a result of Ibañez's nebulous and vacillating political ideology, he left no intellectual legacy to Chilean politics. His long and often poorly defined presence of more than thirty years on the Chilean political scene (during which he often appeared to have little actual sympathy with the political goals of the groups that supported him at various times, e.g. he was too moderate to agree with the nacistas and too respectful of existing institutions to emulate Peronism successfully) produced its most significant results in the early years of his caretaker presidency in the 1920s through his efforts to develop new towns in the regions to the south of the Central Valley and to improve existing infrastructure in the South.

The Región Aysén del General Carlos Ibáñez del Campo is named after him, in honor of his attempts to integrate the isolated regions of Aysén and Magallanes into Chile. The General Ibáñez Airport in Punta Arenas is also named after him.

== See also ==
- Government Junta of Chile (1924)
- Government Junta of Chile (1925)
- Presidential Republic Era

== Sources ==
- San Francisco, Alejandro, and Ángel Soto, eds. Camino a La Moneda. Santiago: Centro De Estudios Bicentenario, 2005.
- Collier, Simon, and William F. Sater. A History of Chile, 1808–2002. 2nd ed. Cambridge UP, 2002.
- Braun, Juan, and Matías Braun, Ignacio Briones, José Díaz, Rolf Lüders, Gert Wagner. Economía chilena 1810–1995: Estadísticas históricas. Santiago: Instituto de Economía de la Pontificia Universidad Católica de Chile, 2000.

Political offices
Preceded by Juan Emilio Ortiz Vega	Minister of War and Navy; 1925–1927	Succeeded by Juan Emilio Ortiz Vega
Preceded by Manuel Rivas Vicuña	Minister of the Interior; 1927	Succeeded by Carlos Frödden
Preceded by Emiliano Figueroa Larraín	President of Chile; 1927–1931	Succeeded by Pedro Opazo
Preceded by Gabriel González Videla	President of Chile; 1952–1958	Succeeded by Jorge Alessandri
