= Pedro Lucio Cuadra =

Chilean engineer and politician

Personal details
- Born: 14 April 1842 Santiago, Chile
- Died: 24 April 1894 (aged 52)

Pedro Lucio Cuadra Luque (14 April 1842 – 24 April 1894) was a Chilean engineer and politician. He studied in the university of his native city, and when still very young was attached to the scientific commission that the government appointed to make a geographical study of the Chilean territory, his personal efforts assuring the success of the commission's work. In 1874, the owners of the newly discovered silver mines at Caracoles, Bolivia, gave Cuadra the general superintendence of the works, and in 1876 he was appointed president of the Bank of Valparaiso. During Aníbal Pinto's administration Cuadra was several times offered a portfolio in the cabinet, but declined it, and in 1882 he accepted that of finance under President Domingo Santa María, distinguishing himself by important reforms. Being a member of the cabinet that negotiated the treaty of peace with Spain, he used all his influence in favor of its negotiation, and King Alfonso XII awarded him the Great Cross of Naval Merit. He was elected senator in 1882 for six years, and was president of the senate in 1886.
