= First Chilean National Congress =

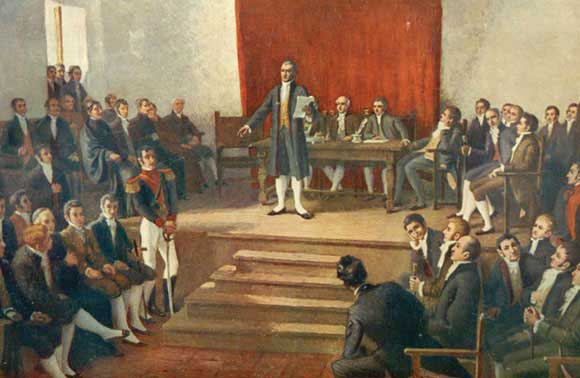
- Inaugural session of the Congress

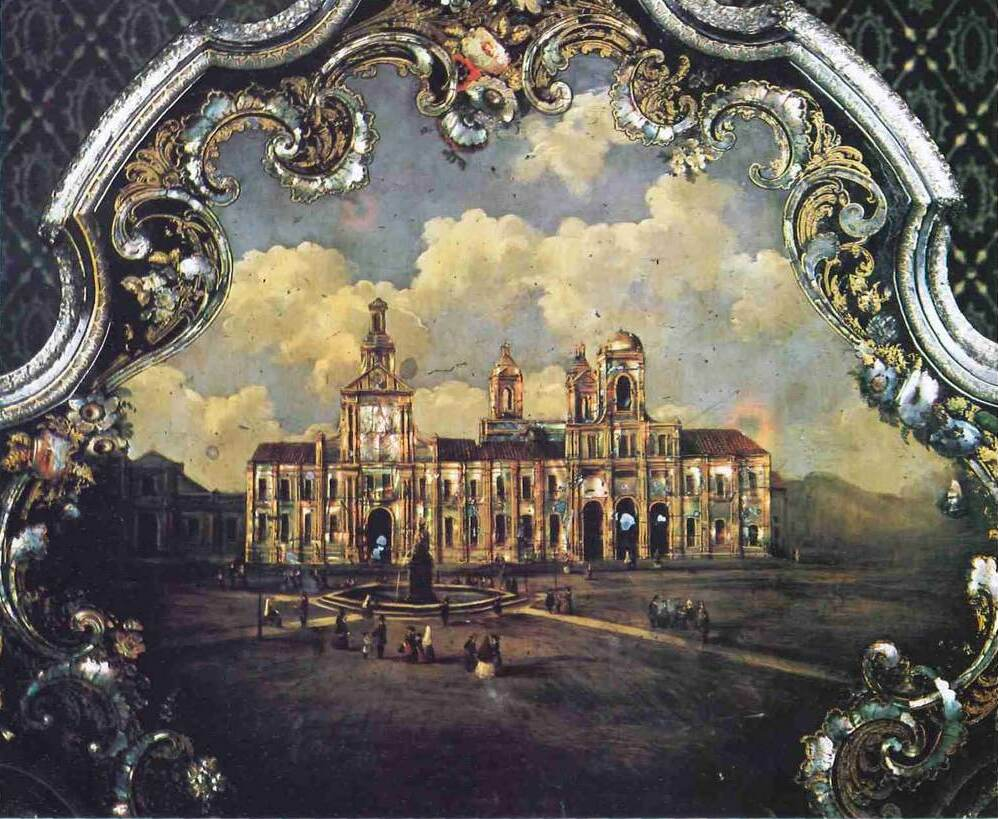
- Palacio de la Real Audiencia de Santiago
- Chambers: Unicameralism

History
- Founded: Palacio de la Real Audiencia de Santiago
- Disbanded: December 2, 1811
- Preceded by: Without Legislative Body
- Succeeded by: 1812 Senate, Chile

Leadership
- President: Joaquín Echeverría Larraín Juan Pablo Fretes; Fray Joaquín Larraín; Juan Cerdán Campaña; Manuel Pérez de Cotapos; Martín Calvo Encalada; Juan Antonio Ovalle Juan Martínez de Rozas

Structure
- Seats: 40 deputies (owners)
- Political groups: Royalist Indifferent party Patriot party

The First Chilean National Congress was the first legislative body established in Chile. It was inaugurated on July 4, 1811, being one of the oldest congresses in Latin America. It was convened to decide the best kind of government for the Kingdom of Chile during the captivity of King Ferdinand VII in the hands of Napoleon. It was in session from July 4 until December 2, when it was dissolved by a coup d'état by General José Miguel Carrera.

With an initial moderate tendency, through the coup d'état of September 4, hegemony was handed over to the so-called radical or patriotic sector, who imposed during the course of the Congress various reforms, such as the law of freedom of womb, or prepared the bases for future transformations, such as the law of cemeteries or the reform of education, which also included the beginning of a process of drafting a constitution, which, due to the closure of the Congress, did not come to fruition.

== Call for the first Congress ==
The gestation of this first congress came directly from the First Government Board, installed on September 18, 1810, since the junta had been elected only by the inhabitants of Santiago, being therefore the expression of a single city, and therefore only took the title of provisional government, only "while the deputies of all the provinces of Chile were summoned and arrived, to organize the one that was to govern from now on".

Before the junta sent instructions, some provincial councils had already held elections. In Petorca the subdelegate Manuel de la Vega had himself elected deputy by the council he presided over, and in Concepción Andrés del Alcázar, Count de la Marquina, was elected through an open council. These elections were to be invalidated, at the request of the Santiago council, although they were later accepted as long as they were in accordance with the rules established in the text of the convocation.

Many of the patriots who were already thinking of full independence had their doubts about the immediate results of the action of the congress, based on the conditions of Chile's political development. Bernardo O'Higgins wrote:

As for me, I have no doubt that the first congress of Chile will show the most childish ignorance and will be guilty of all sorts of follies. Such consequences are inevitable, because of our total lack of knowledge and experience; and we cannot expect it to be otherwise until we begin to learn.

By order of the junta, the council of Santiago proposed on October 13 certain rules for the election, about the electors and possible candidates, although the junta did not decide anything for many days.

The junta discussed at length the call for the congress, and there was a lot of resistance to it. Again the council insisted on December 14 with an energetic proclamation by José Miguel Infante for a convocation. Finally, on December 15, mainly thanks to the impulse of Juan Martínez de Rozas, the main member of the junta, the approval of the Text calling for the First Chilean National Congress, which was quite inspired by the Spanish call to the Cortes of Cadiz, was achieved, distributing it to the other provinces of the kingdom.

The main mandates of the congress were:

To agree on the system that best suits their regime and security and prosperity during the absence of the King. They must discuss, examine and resolve calmly and peaceably, what kind of Government is suitable for the country in the present circumstances; they must dictate rules to the different authorities, determine their duration and powers; they must establish the means of preserving internal and external security and of promoting the means of giving occupation to the numerous class of the people that will make them virtuous, multiply them and retain them in the quietude and tranquility on which that of the State so much depends: and finally, they must deal with the general happiness of a people, who place in their hands the fate of their posterity.

Forty-two deputies were to be elected, and for each of the proprietary deputies there was to be a substitute, and the election was to be carried out by means of secret ballots. Deputies could be elected:

The natural inhabitants of the Party, or those from outside it residing in the kingdom, who by their patriotic virtues, their talents, and accredited prudence, have merited the esteem and confidence of their fellow citizens, being over twenty-five years of age, of good opinion and reputation, even if they are secular ecclesiastics.

These could not be elected:

Priests, subdelegates, and veteran officers, whose jobs require precise residence... those who have offered and admitted bribery so that the election falls on a certain person, and in the act of the election may be accused: the college of electors will determine the cause in a public and verbal trial, and the same penalty will be incurred by the slanderers.

The main institution in charge of the election in each locality was the council, which was responsible for electing those who voted, reviewing the electoral process and verifying the results. According to the text of the convocation they had the right to elect:

All individuals who by their fortune, employment, talents, or quality enjoy some consideration in the districts in which they reside, being neighbors, and over twenty-five years of age, as well as secular ecclesiastics, priests, subdelegates and military personnel", excluding "foreigners, bankrupts, those who are not neighbors, those prosecuted for crimes, those who have suffered infamous punishment, and debtors to the Royal Treasury."

Some neighbors, mainly José Miguel Infante, believed that all Chileans should vote by universal suffrage, since everyone had the imprescriptible right to name their deputies, although this opinion did not prosper.

Although at first there were no major objections to the text sent by the junta, the council complained because it considered that the representation of the capital, 6 deputies, did not match either the population or the importance of the city, so they proposed doubling their number. The council approved the proposal.

== Election ==
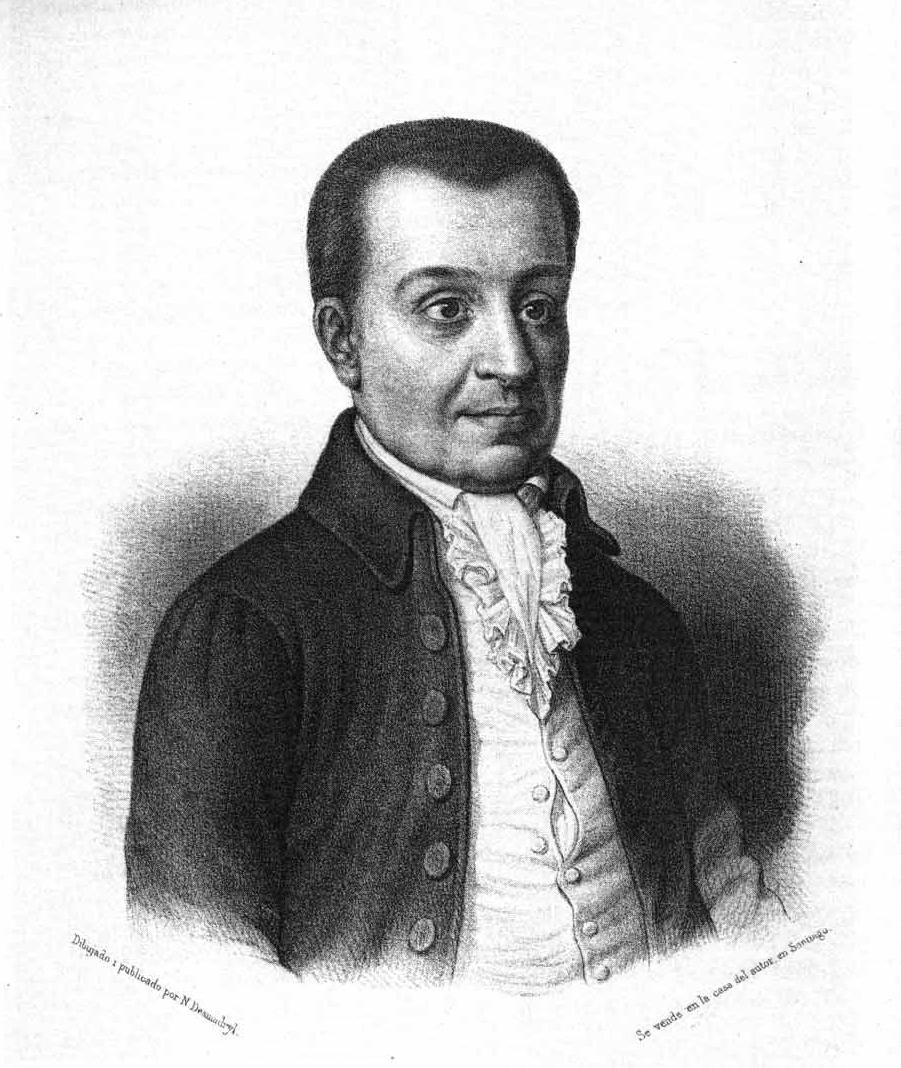
Juan Martínez de Rozas, leader of the exalted group.

There was some skepticism about the process, because Chile was a country always respectful of the laws coming from the metropolis, which was dictated by a monarch of divine right, so it was not understood how a group of men born in Chile could have a legislative authority and give the country a constitution. In an attempt to promote the election, the council tried to influence the minds of the neighbors through the clergy, relying on the new internal bishop of Santiago, Domingo Errázuriz (replacing Bishop Aldunate who had fallen into madness), who had earlier pronounced himself in favor of the revolution. The bishopric issued a document on March 2 in favor of the elections, but the majority of the clergy gave it scant compliance, since most had no interest in the course of the revolution, and only a minority cooperated with the council's wishes.

Elections began to be held in the provinces, where different parties began to be distinguished, which were divided by the impulse or not they gave to the revolution. On one side were the radicals or exalted, led by Juan Martínez de Rozas, the moderates, who had the council of Santiago as their main source of political expression, with Agustín Eyzaguirre as one of their main exponents, although they did not have any leader to lead them, and a realist sector, whose stronghold was the Royal Audience.

Elections in the provinces were not lacking in electoral influences. Families who were on one side or the other sent letters recommending certain candidates, and the influence of government authorities was felt, as occurred in the election of Concepción.

The election was carried out in the following manner: A solemn mass was held in the parish church, after which the electors gathered in the council hall, depositing the votes on written ballots, and then proceeding to the scrutiny, generally carried out with little difficulty, since there was usually a low number of electors. After the election they again went to the parish church, where a Te Deum was sung.

For Santiago the elections had been set for April 1. The most exalted group feared that those opposed to the revolution would prevent them from having representatives in the congress, so Bernardo de Vera y Pintado and Carlos Correa asked the junta to exclude 34 neighbors who were recognized enemies of the revolution, and the council accepted this proposal and even excluded some more.

=== Figueroa mutiny ===
The elections in Santiago were set for April 1. In order to keep order, the chief of the plaza commander Juan de Dios Vial ordered lieutenant colonel Juan Miguel Benavente to take 50 men from the San Pablo barracks and to station himself in the small square of the consulate, where the event would take place. After the first hours of the morning, Benavente began to notice signs of insurrection, the soldiers asked for whom they were going to fight, and only when he told them that it was to defend the cause of King Ferdinand VII did the soldiers set off. The soldiers asked that the infantry company Concepción, which was in Santiago under the orders of Tomás de Figueroa, be sent to Santiago. Benavente tried to repress one of the revolted soldiers, but Corporal Eduardo Molina came out in defense of him, who said that they did not recognize any other superior than Figueroa. Corporal Molina proclaimed to the insurrectionists the need to overthrow the junta's government and reinstate the former governor García Carrasco.

Soon Captain Figueroa appeared and took the lead of the mutiny. He headed his group towards the consulate square, believing to find the members of the junta and the council, but he found it deserted. Disconcerted, they went to the main square, and Figueroa entered the room of the Royal Audience. This court answered him that it was not in disposition to give him any orders without consulting the Board, which they were going to do immediately, and that therefore he should wait for the result and answer, restraining himself and his troops to avoid bloodshed.

The members of the junta were still at home when they heard rumors of the insurrection. Immediately the members Rozas, Carrera and Rosales, who were in charge of the junta after the death of Mateo de Toro y Zambrano, met in the house of Fernando Márquez de la Plata. They ordered commander Vial to go to the place where the mutineers were with the grenadier battalion and two pieces of artillery. Orders and counter-orders that were given created a great confusion in the atmosphere, being generally considered that it was the energy and direction imposed by Rozas what saved the situation. Commander Vial managed to form a column of 500 men, which was joined by a picket of artillerymen under the command of Luis Carrera and Bernardo Montuel. The troops loyal to the government set out, while Figueroa's troops remained in the eastern part of the plaza.

After some unsuccessful attempts at dialogue, a rifle shot was heard, which was answered by Vial's men with shrapnel from one of the cannons. This caused enormous confusion, which led to the dismemberment of the rebel troops, leaving 20 wounded and 10 dead, among them Corporal Molina, the instigator of the revolt. Figueroa escaped shouting, "I am lost, I have been tricked".

Martínez de Rozas went to the San Pablo barracks, where it was said that the fight could be vindicated, but the infantrymen of Concepción, lacking command, abandoned the barracks and dispersed towards the road to Valparaíso. Subsequently, Rozas confronted the members of the audience, accusing them of being instigators. He was also in charge of the capture of Figueroa, who had taken refuge in the convent of Santo Domingo.

A trial was held against Figueroa, from which a confession could be extracted, and to this, added to the declarations of ten witnesses, the junta proceeded to pronounce sentence. The vocals Rozas and Rosales demanded the death penalty, while Carrera and Reina opted for perpetual banishment. Márquez de la Plata, as accidental president of the junta, broke the tie by pronouncing death. He declared himself a traitor to his country and to the government and that, four hours after the notification, he would be shot in the dungeon where he was being held. After the sentence was carried out, his body was exposed under the portico of the jail.

As a result of the mutiny, the junta toughened its measures against the opposition, dissolving the Royal Court and expelling many residents of the kingdom, as happened with the ex-governor García Carrasco.

=== Elections in the capital ===
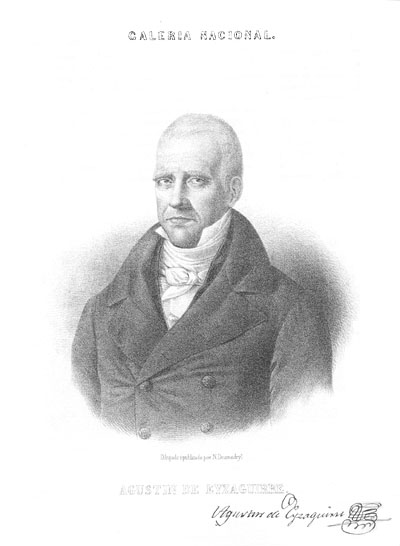
Agustín Eyzaguirre and the moderate group defeated the Rozas faction and won a majority of seats in Congress.

On April 30, the elected deputies of the provinces that were in Santiago addressed the junta of government, and taking the floor Agustín Vial Santelices, they stated that due to their number they were in a position to represent the towns that had given their powers, so they demanded participation in the government. Some members were opposed because the elections had not been held in the capital, but Rozas, having a majority of supporters in this group, supported the request and had it accepted. The council of Santiago strongly complained about this action, but their arguments were not heard, and the governmental junta was definitively transformed into a junta of 28 members, in which Rozas and his supporters governed for the time being.

The moderate group believed that the best way to snatch the hegemony from the exalted group was to hold the elections in Santiago as soon as possible. The election was called for May 6. That day, under the corridors of the main patio of the Palace of the Governors, 6 tables were set up to receive the votes of the electors, who filled out 2 lists with 12 names each for proprietary and substitute deputies, under the direction of prominent persons and assisted by notaries public. (Note: According to Barros Arana, p.338: "each receiving table was directed by six individuals in the following manner, a member of the governmental board, two deputies of those who were already incorporated into the board, two lobbyists and a neighbor of the town, it should be noted that being only five members of the board, surely one of the secretaries was placed at a sixth table. Each table was also assisted by one of the city's notaries public. As none of these commissions had a register of electors, and as these voted by simply presenting the invitation form they had received, each one went to the table of his choice. The votes were handed to the president of the table, who deposited them in the ballot box, which was not to be opened until the counting of the votes. The notices distributed by the chapter summoning for the voting were about nine hundred".) Near noon, when the process was about to end, Rozas, seeing the possible defeat of his party, demanded that the officers of the pardo battalion be allowed to vote. In spite of the council's initial resistance, they agreed, on the condition of suspending the twelve o'clock voting and continuing it at four o'clock. During this period, the moderates managed to win over the pardos and secure their triumph, which was confirmed when the results were proclaimed at four o'clock in the afternoon of May 4.

The election was celebrated with great applause. On May 9, a Te Deum was celebrated in the cathedral, with a great military parade and artillery salvos. That same day, the newly elected deputies were incorporated into the executive directory, which governed the country until the installation of the first congress.

== Installation of the National Congress ==
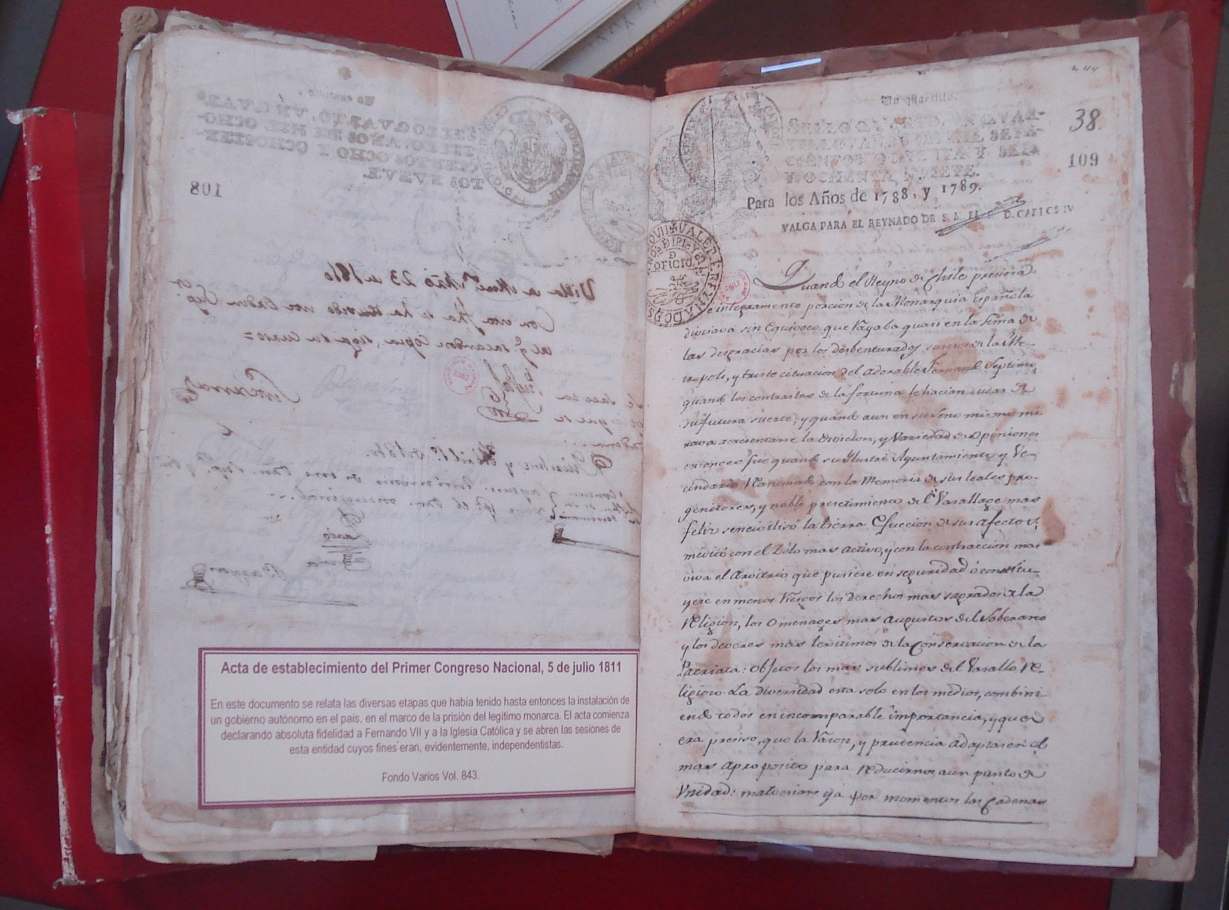
Act of Installation of the First National Congress of Chile. National Archives of Chile

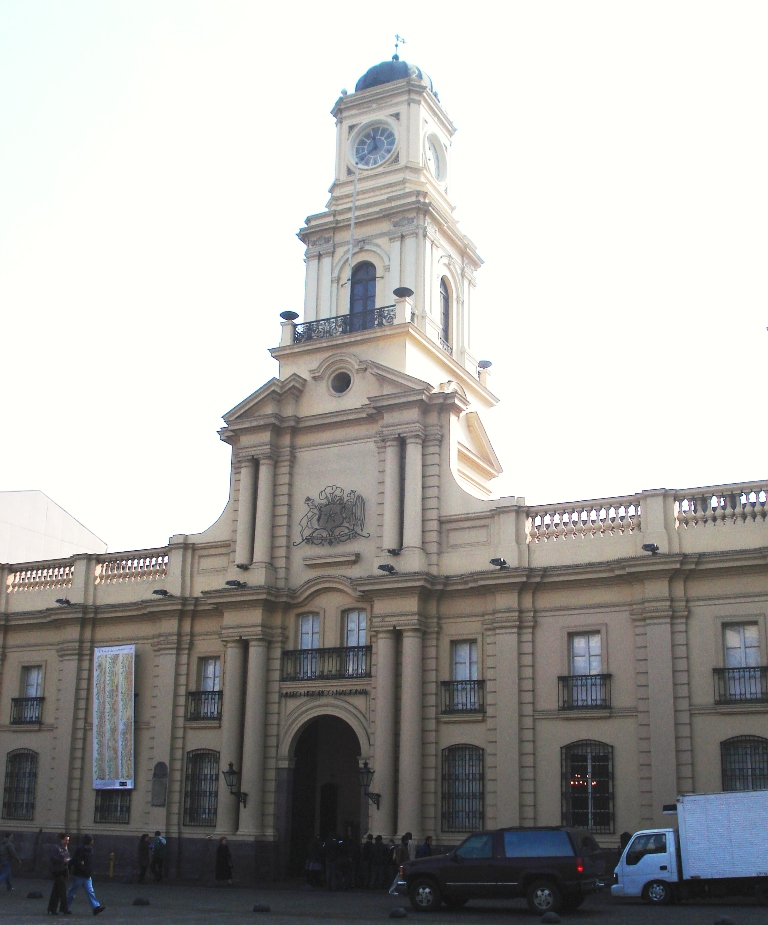
Building of the former Royal Court Palace of Santiago, now the National Historical Museum.

The opening of the Congress was set for July 4. For its sessions, the rooms where the Royal Audience had functioned were assigned. On the day of the installation, at 10 a.m., a retinue composed of the deputies, the members of the junta, the council and the new court of justice, together with some military personnel, university doctors and high ranking neighbors, left for the cathedral, in the midst of the troops that guarded it for the security of the day. Inside the church, after the celebration of the gospel, Father Camilo Henríquez, who was in charge of delivering the patriotic sermon of that day, went up to the pulpit. In his speech, Father Henríquez recalled the situation of Spain, the danger of the colonies of being subjugated or falling into anarchy if they did not take care of their defense and if institutions were not given that were a guarantee for all and that made despotism impossible, defending the right of the Chilean people to give themselves the constitution that best suits their welfare and progress, dividing his argument into 3 propositions:

First proposition: The principles of the Catholic religion, relative to politics, authorize the National Congress of Chile to form itself a Constitution.

Second proposition: There exist in the Chilean nation rights by virtue of which the body of its representatives can establish a Constitution and dictate providences that assure its liberty and happiness.

Third proposition: There are reciprocal duties between the individuals of the State of Chile and those of its National Congress, without the observance of which freedom and public happiness cannot be achieved. The former are bound to obedience; the latter to love of country, which inspires the right and all social virtues. The proof of these propositions is the argument of this speech.

After the sermon, the secretary José Gregorio Argomedo stood up and in front of the members of Congress, took the oath, with the following formula:

Do you swear by God our Lord and on the Holy Gospels to defend the Catholic, Apostolic, Roman Religion?

Do you swear to obey Fernando Seventh of Bourbon, our Catholic Monarch?

Do you swear to defend the kingdom from all its internal and external enemies, faithfully fulfilling the charge

To which the deputies responded: Yes, we swear.

After mass, the deputies went out to the square, where the troops greeted them by presenting arms and raising an artillery salute. When they arrived at the hall of the new Congress, they took their seats, and being Juan Martínez de Rozas accidental president of the junta, he pronounced the inaugural speech, in which he recalled the high duties imposed by the situation, the need to dictate laws founded not on theoretical principles that few understood, but on the practical knowledge of the conditions of the country, so that they would be an antemural against anarchy and a safeguard against despotism. He exhorted the deputies to work with justice and conscience in such a great task, concluding his speech:

Magistrates, strive to be such that posterity will bless you; aspire to be cited by the nations as honored rather than wise; embrace with zeal the most thorny business, pursue it with assiduity and constancy, lead it to its end without leaving your tranquillity; do good and limit your views to the sweet satisfaction of having done well; immolate yourselves generously to your country and hide from it with skill the services you do it. These are the qualities of an illustrious citizen, gentlemen, and these are yours.

After his speech, the members of the junta relinquished their powers and left the room, leaving the Congress installed with full powers. Juan Antonio Ovalle, being the oldest of those present, assumed the presidency of the institution, who in turn delivered his own speech, after which the opening session was terminated.

That same night the event was the object of a popular celebration, with general illumination of the entire city and fireworks.

The legislative body that began its functions was composed of 36 proprietary deputies, (Note: The number of deputies should have been 42, but elections were not held in Valdivia due to the resistance of the governor of the plaza, Alejandro Eagar, and the election had not yet been held in Huasco, from which Francisco Antonio Pérez García was elected, who could not serve as a deputy because he was occupied in a post in the new court of justice.) who had their corresponding 36 substitutes due to some eventuality of absence, (Note: Not all of the regular deputies attended the installation ceremony, being replaced by alternates, although it is not possible to determine who were present, since the installation minutes only mention the elected deputies.) all representatives of their respective towns and villages. On July 5, the rules were established for the presidency of the congress, which would last 15 days, and Juan Antonio Ovalle was elected president and Martín Calvo Encalada Vice President. That same day, the oath of loyalty of the military chiefs, prelates of the religious orders and senior employees of the administration was taken.

== Congressional work up to the September 4 coup ==
The first sessions of the Congress were dedicated to questions of administration, such as the designation of secretaries, finally electing two ecclesiastics, Diego Antonio Elizondo and José Francisco Echaurren.

Since July 8, the need to create an executive junta and to specify its attributions was discussed. This provoked a great debate, since it was certain that the junta would be composed of the majority in Congress, so the most exalted deputies who were in the minority tried to oppose such a proposal. Again, the fact that 12 deputies would be elected in the capital instead of the 6 initially indicated was invoked, although their initiative was quickly frustrated.

Numerous rumors, proclamations and mocking writings were circulated to denigrate one side or the other. Such writings made the moderate majority believe that it was indispensable to prevent the circulation of such writings or to impose penalties on the authors, granting rewards to the authors' informers. The radical minority invoked the immorality of encouraging whistleblowing, and that being a representative regime, it was indispensable to recognize the right of citizens to expose their opinions as it was done in free countries. This attitude forced the majority to desist from its project.

After 15 days, and when the leadership of the Congress had to be renewed, the moderates gave the presidency to Martín Calvo Encalada and as vice president to Agustín Urrejola, the latter a declared enemy of the new institutions. This caused the irritation of the Rozas group, who would prepare a new strategy to prevent the formation of the executive junta that was to be appointed on July 27. The plan consisted of expelling the most reactionary deputies from Congress as Saracens or enemies of the new institutions, so that, leaving the exalted group in a minority, the executive junta would have Rozas as its head. The meetings to carry out the plan were held in the house of Diego Larrain, preparing for July 27 for its execution, which would have the support of the troops under the command of Juan José Carrera, but the attempt ended in a ridiculous disaster, causing only a moment of agitation in the assembly and deferring the appointment of the junta for a few days.

The government did little to punish the culprits, limiting itself to redouble vigilance in the barracks and in the city. In the session of July 29, it was resolved that the junta would be composed of three members, of equal hierarchy, and that they would alternate for months to hold the presidency, but the determination of the minority prevented the development of an election.

On July 25, the English warship Standard arrived in Valparaíso, armed with 64 cannons under the command of Captain Charles Elphinstone Fleming, coming from Cádiz, with eighty-four days of navigation, and on junta came José Miguel Carrera, Pedro Valdés, Ramón Errázuriz, and Mr. Caspe, Oidor provided for the Royal Court. The latter, in knowledge of the state of the kingdom and the repeal of the Royal Court and its members, remained on junta and reporting his fate to Congress, had to continue to Lima disillusioned. In the correspondence carried by the ship came many pliegos and royal orders addressed to the Board, the Royal Audience, the two councils and at the same time many gazettes confirming the state of the war in the Peninsula.

Captain Fleming's mission was to collect the elected deputies for the Cortes of Cadiz and a tribute to maintain the war. Captain Fleming did not have the slightest idea of the process that the Spanish-American countries were undergoing, and although he knew that the government was in the hands of a congress, he addressed his communications to the "president governor of the kingdom of Chile."

In his first note he informed the Congress of his mission, in accordance with the alliance of Spain and England against Napoleon. Thanks to the efforts of the exalted, the Congress avoided the delivery of funds, responding to the captain with evasiveness and inviting him to visit Santiago.

Fleming refused this invitation, without desisting from claiming the funds he wished to take to Spain. In the Congress there were some who wished to cooperate with the request of the English captain, which was again opposed by the exalted. Bernardo O'Higgins, recognized for his phlegmatic moderation in spite of being of the most pro-independence group, ardently proclaimed: "although we are in a minority, we will know how to make up for our numerical inferiority with our energy and our courage, and we will not fail to have enough arms to effectively oppose the exit of this money, so necessary for our country threatened with invasion".

On August 6, Congress delivered its definitive reply:

The lack of foresight with which the leaders of the former Government lavished the Royal Treasury on luxurious buildings and other objects of minor importance, brought it into our hands weakened in such a way that it has been necessary to use the meager funds available to pay for a foot army, not only indispensable to defend the kingdom from the armed force of the usurper, but also, and very principally, from his machinations and intrigues aimed at revolutionizing these dominions, whose security is entrusted to us to maintain our unfortunate Sovereign; consequently, and in spite of the best wishes, we have not at this day any wealth to send.

After this Fleming withdrew in bad taste from the Chilean shores.

The question of the organization of the executive junta was still in suspense. As of August 7, the issue of its creation began to be discussed. That same day the rumor spread that Captain Fleming had disembarked in Valparaíso, imprisoning the Governor of the port. The radicals, determined to give strength to the news, maintained that it was indispensable to organize the junta that same day, appointing Rozas as president and first member. The majority of the Congress, although frightened, did not allow themselves to be dominated, and after sending for news of the situation, verified that it was an invention.

The following day the discussion was resumed, the bases of the attributions of the Congress and the Board were proposed, a subject on which the majority of the deputies were in agreement. Manuel de Salas, on the subject of the territorial division and its representation in the junta, proposed that Coquimbo should be recognized on an equal footing with the two intendancies, thus giving it representation, and in the minds of the radicals, this should be given to Rozas.

The majority nevertheless rejected the proposal. On August 9, seeing themselves inevitably defeated, the twelve deputies of the radical minority rose from their seats and protesting against the conduct of the majority and declaring the resolution to give an account to their towns of what was happening there, they withdrew from the Congress hall. The excuse given for this action was based on the number of deputies from Santiago, increased to 12, which they argued was an outrageous and scandalous situation.

The majority, in their surprise, remained inflexible without attempting conciliation. On the morning of August 10, what was left of the Congress met in an extraordinary meeting, appointing the members of the junta, positions that fell to Martín Calvo Encalada, Juan José Aldunate and Francisco Javier del Solar.

The majority called for new elections, in which the same people who had withdrawn could be reelected, although it recommended for the safety of the kingdom that it was better that the election should fall to other individuals. This circular was the cause of conflicts in some towns, without the moderates gaining any advantage, and the powers were restored to some of the radicals, as in the case of O'Higgins.

Rozas left the capital for Concepción with some of his supporters, ready to raise the spirits of the southern provinces in a kind of crusade in favor of freedom.

On September 2, the Congress issued a regulation by which its sessions would be adjusted. It consisted of 15 articles, and among its fundamental points, it was established that the president (or the vice-president in his absence) would lead the debate and was to propose business one day before to be examined the following day. For matters of qualified gravity, the president would designate two deputies of the best instruction in the matter to instruct their colleagues (this is the antecedent of the parliamentary commissions). In the discussions, the deputies should speak in a moderate tone and in the order of their seats, and one would not be allowed to interrupt another, except when granted permission by the president in case of an urgent occurrence. Voting would take place the day after the discussion of the project. The opinions would be given orally or in writing and in the latter case could be made known to the public with the agreement of the corporation.

== José Miguel Carrera's first coup d'état ==
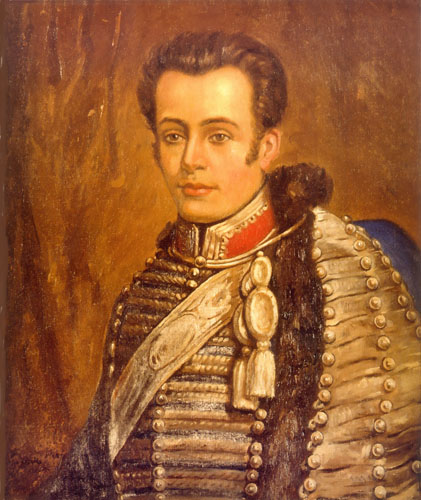
Portrait of José Miguel Carrera Verdugo, Oil on canvas, Ezequiel Plaza.

José Miguel Carrera had arrived in the country on the Standard ship. He soon moved to Santiago, meeting with his family who had actively participated in the revolution, and his brothers informed them in more detail about the course of events. His brother Juan José tried to introduce him to a conspiracy planned for July 28, asking José Miguel to delay the movement until he returned once again from Valparaíso, where he was to return to convince Fleming to come to the capital. This first coup attempt was a failure as previously narrated.

On August 12, Carrera returned to Santiago, and it did not take him long to get in contact with the supporters of the radical party who were in the capital, and after some meetings in the house of Miguel Astorga, in which he was told that the majority of the Congress was formed by inept and enemies of the revolutionary cause, Carrera joined the cause, not without first trying to influence the mood of the president of the congress Manuel Pérez de Cotapos so that he would give another course to the government, and to make sure that he and his brothers would be in charge of directing the execution of the coup d'état that would take place on September 4.

On Wednesday the 4th the coup took place. Not everything happened as previously agreed, only the sixty Grenadiers assigned to the artillery fulfilled exactly their assignment under the command of Juan José, who took the artillery barracks, which had been locked and stripped of weapons by his brother Luis, an action that ended with one dead and one wounded, without further resistance.

After this, with all speed, notices were sent to the two barracks of Hussars and Grenadiers, asking for troops to reinforce and secure the movement. Then officer Zorrilla was sent with twelve men to imprison Commander Francisco Javier Reina in his own house, which was done quickly, placing him incommunicado with the surveillance of two sentries.

José Miguel Carrera, mounted on horseback, organized a column of artillerymen and grenadiers and marched to the main square. The members of the Congress and the executive junta were unaware of the events and worked normally, until the shouts of "Revolution! Revolution!" were heard. Bernardo de Vélez and Juan Fretes closed the doors that fell on the square and placed their soldiers in arms to prevent the deputies from escaping. At that moment Carrera arrived, surrounded by a part of the people who looked on expectantly.

After dismounting, José Miguel Carrera read a document in which he presented the demands of his group as petitions of the people, warning that, as commissioner, he asked for and expected a speedy resolution. The petitions were:

.

1. That the number of deputies from Santiago be reduced to seven, and that of the province of Concepción that had more be reduced to two, leaving the rest of the provinces with one representative.
2. That the deputies of Santiago, Infante, Portales, Ovalle, Díaz Muñoz, Chaparro, Tocornal and Goycolea be separated; and to complete the seven that were to remain, Larraín and Correa. (Note: Carrera, in the list he had, should have included Alcalde among those expelled, however: I did not know anyone except through those at the meetings; but I did not fail to recognize the part that the faction had. It occurred to me when I handed in the sheet containing the petitions that Eyzaguirre, because of his gold buckles, powder, fat cane, scarlet cape and velvet shoes, had to be more Gothic than Mayor; that is why I erased Mayor with my pencil and put Eyzaguirre (...) This was my sin and the only intrigue of that day; everything else was the work of the Casa Otomana. However, his intention did not prosper, since he was the only congressman whom the Congress refused to expel.)
3. That the deputy of Osorno, Fernández, be separated.
4. That the current members of the Executive Branch be removed and five be appointed, which were Encalada, Rosales, Rozas (and due to his absence Benavente), Mackenna and Marín, Secretaries Vial and Argomedo.
5. That no friar can be a deputy, nor be elected, or admitted to this employment, subjects who are not of proven adherence to the system.
6. That the Fiscal Agent Sanchez, and the City Attorney Rodriguez; the Aldermen Cruz and Mata, and the Government Clerk Borquez be separated from their jobs.
7. Don Manuel Fernández will be confined to Combarbalá, Don Domingo Díaz Muñoz and Don Juan Antonio Ovalle to their estates, for six years; and if any plot or infraction is understood, they will be put to the sword as traitors to the King and the homeland. Don Antonio Mata to his farm and Sir J Juan Manuel de la Cruz y Bahamonde to Tucapel, Infante to Melipilla.
8. That Ignacio Carrera be named Brigadier.
9. That the Corps of Patriots that had been discussed in the first board be formed.
10. That Don Francisco Lastra be named Governor of Valparaíso in the vacancy of Don Juan Mackenna, who was removed as a member of the board.

The military pressure exerted fear among the deputies present, who debated the imposition of these petitions. After long deliberation, most of the requests of the insurgent group were accepted, creating a new executive junta made up of Juan Enrique Rosales, Juan Martínez de Rozas, Martín Calvo Encalada, Juan Mackenna and Gaspar Marín, in addition to having a patriot predominance in Congress.

== The reform era ==
The patriotic deputies increased their power in Congress, because in addition to the expulsion of the most reactionary deputies, the provinces of the deputies who withdrew from Congress had reelected them. Some regions, such as La Serena, even revoked the powers of their deputies opposed to the movement. The moderates in parliament bowed to the victors and did not put up much resistance.

On September 20, Joaquín Larraín was elected president of Congress, and Manuel Antonio Recabaren, both patriots who had participated in the Carrerino coup, was elected vice-president. The Congress, which until then had functioned without the presence of the public, decided to open its doors to anyone who wished to listen to the discussions, with a small honor guard as protection.

=== Administrative reforms ===
In accordance with an old idea of territorial division, the Congress created the province of Coquimbo, with a political and military governor, a position that fell to Tomas O'Higgins.

On October 25, the executive board proposed a project for vigilance, public safety and police, creating an official immediately dependent on the government, appointed by Congress every two years. This project, which underwent an arduous revision in Congress, and after some indications were made, was sent back to the junta, but could only be put into effect on April 24, 1813.

The realization of a general census of the country was proposed, noting that the parties were not well represented due to the lack of a pattern or census, as the demarcation of the parties was imperfect for the same reason. In the session of October 9, it was agreed to practice a census, imitating the way in which they are done in other countries. As a complement, the priests were charged with forming a general pattern of their parishioners to serve as a background or basis for the general census.

On September 23, a communication was addressed to the council to end the auction of the positions of aldermen and to establish a new method of election, and on October 11 it repealed the provision by auction of the position of alderman in the council of Santiago, and while the new system was dictated, which was never implemented, the 3 vacant positions would be appointed by the Congress.

In the judicial aspects, the provision that forced every lay judge to proceed with the accessory of a lawyer was reiterated. The court of cassation ad honores was created, which was to work on important cases, functioning as a court of last instance in the absence of the royal audience and the Spanish courts.

An attempt was made to establish the Courts of Settlement as a way of putting an end to endless judicial processes, by allowing a settlement before a lawsuit was reached, although the measure was not sufficiently well received and could not be carried out.

The discussion on a draft constitution, which had been the main reason for convening the Congress, was constantly postponed, until on November 13, shortly before Carrera's second coup d'état took away the political power of the Congress, a commission was appointed to draw up a draft of the "constitution that should govern Chile during the captivity of the king", which was to be submitted to the Congress as soon as possible for its examination and approval. Juan Egaña would draft from these instructions a Draft Constitution for the State of Chile, which was only published in 1813, without having any application.

=== Ecclesiastical reforms ===
Some ecclesiastical reforms were initiated, with the Congress arrogating to itself the right of patronage. The parochial rights, which had been authorized by royal decree in 1732, were suppressed, and although on paper they were not onerous, they became a serious tax burden, saying that there were "children who were not baptized, people who lived in concubinage and dead people who were buried in the hills because the interested parties could not pay the respective rights".

The dissociation of Chile from the institution of the Tribunal of the Holy Office was initiated, suspending the sending of the corresponding quota to Lima, and that this money be used within the country for pious purposes. Given the excessive concentration of goods of nuns' convents, it was decided on October 18 that from that moment on, the goods that the nuns had paid as dowry to take their habits, with the exception of the Capuchin nuns, would pass to their relatives upon their death.

Contributions for the construction of churches or temples were suppressed in order to obtain resources for the public treasury. The expenses of the bulls were abolished. The payment of fifty pesos that the regulars had to pay to their superior upon leaving the cloister was abolished.

These ecclesiastical reforms usually generated opposition from those affected against the Congress, which was reflected in violent attacks by some religious on politicians in their pastorals.

=== Cemetery Law ===
Congressman Bernardo O'Higgins proposed to Congress a cemetery law to end the custom of burying the dead in or near churches, inspired by the efforts of his father, Governor Ambrosio O'Higgins, who tried to end the practice but faced opposition from the clergy, despite having the approval of the king. The Congress supported the proposal, and even obtained the support of some ecclesiastics such as Juan Pablo Fretes. The Congress decided that "an attempt should be made to build a public and common cemetery in the part designated by the city council, conciliating the comfort of those attending with the location of the building, so that by placing it on the leeward side of the city, the prevailing winds would keep away the infection that could not be avoided by means of the known precautions".

A commission was appointed to determine the form and manner of establishing a cemetery in Santiago. When the law was about to materialize, the November coup d'état ended the political capacity of the parliament. It would be Bernardo O'Higgins himself, but as supreme director, who would revive and carry out the cemetery initiative.

=== Treasury ===
One of the main concerns of Congress was the management of public finances, which were so unbalanced due to the political situation. Attempts were made to avoid increasing taxes, as this would alienate sympathy for the institution, and so they tried to eliminate expenses.

Among the few tax changes, the suppression of certain exemptions granted by royal orders stands out. A rise in postal rates was decreed, which did not have a major impact since correspondence was very scarce.

In the reduction of expenses, they began by affecting the opponents of the government and officials of the old regime, such as Judas Tadeo Reyes, who was reduced to a third of the salary he earned previously. The junta was asked to be informed of all the positions that remained vacant, to determine if they should be abolished or not, and if not, to see what their income would be, warning that no salary should exceed two thousand pesos a year (with the exception of high-ranking military officers and governors of important places). The office of the temporalities of the Jesuits was suppressed and these were transferred to the general treasury.

The export duties of 3% created in the regulation of February 21, 1811 were abolished, replacing it with a duty of 25 cents per wheat export. The consumption of guillipatagua was decreed, instead of hierba mate, which had stopped coming from Paraguay. Temporary freedom was given to the cultivation of tobacco, but without abolishing the tobacco tax.

=== Military defense ===
On the military side, the new Battalion of Patriots was created, which was called up voluntarily, although not all the quotas that the government had hoped for were filled, and only 8 battalions were formed. A selection of the senior army commanders began to be made, separating those whose lukewarmness raised suspicions of their loyalty to the new government. (Note: This happened with the commander of the Pardos battalion, who was replaced by Juan de Dios Vial. SCL, p. 71)) The battalion of Commerce, which had been organized since 1777 from the distinguished and wealthy merchants of the capital, who were mainly European and therefore suspicious of the government, was also disbanded.

On the problem of where to obtain arms, negotiations began with Buenos Aires, who promised to sell arms to Chile as soon as they were received from Europe, offering them when the factories installed in Buenos Aires and Tucumán began to work. In view of the failure of this route, due to the difficulties beyond the Andes, on October 8 it was decided to entrust the junta with the purchase of arms from private individuals who wanted to sell them, and at the same time to register those remaining in the hands of their owners. Finally, it was agreed to commission the substitute deputy Francisco Ramón Vicuña to organize an arms factory in Chile, although the lack of specialists and materials prevented the unrealization of this project. That same day it was also decided to create the position of inspector of troops, to be in charge of the care of arms, and the junta was entrusted with its appointment.

=== Foreign affairs ===
The diplomatic agent in Buenos Aires, Antonio Álvarez, whose participation in internal politics brought him antipathy, was dismissed, accusing him of sending to the junta of Buenos Aires a denigrating version of the events of the Figueroa mutiny, and of circulating anti-Congress pamphlets. He was dismissed at the session of September 26 amidst conceptual speeches by Álvarez and the president of the Congress.

In order to reinforce the ties between governments and to keep abreast of the latest news from the peninsula, the Congress designated Francisco Antonio Pinto as Plenipotentiary to the Board of Buenos Aires on the 9th.

With Peru, on October 9, a secret agent was appointed in that country, which represented the greatest threat to the Chilean government due to the attitude that Viceroy Abascal seemed to be adopting. The justification for sending the agent was "to have exact, prompt and reliable news of the occurrences, opinions and designs of the inhabitants of the neighboring provinces and their governments".

The viceroy found out about these maneuvers and sent an energetic communication in order to be given an official account of what had happened in Chile after the installation of the first junta of government. In a document written by Manuel de Salas, a response was given to the viceroy's letter explaining the events and trying to demonstrate that they were nothing more than proof of loyalty to the king and that it was not possible to act in any other way given the circumstances.

=== Education ===
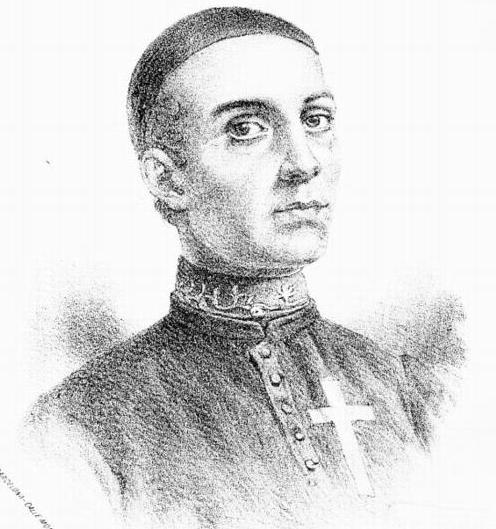
Fray Camilo Henríquez designed a teaching organization plan, which would greatly influence the later development of education in Chile.

Congress had planned to carry out an ambitious plan of reforms for education, so the junta on October 5 was given the necessary background information to undertake the changes in the public schools. Then on October 7, the rector of the University of San Felipe was asked for another report on the situation of the institution and on the means that could be used for its further advancement.

The alderman Nicolás Matorras and the city attorney were commissioned to carry out a public act among the students of the primary schools supported by the council, charging them to give an account of the results they could observe. Apparently, the experience was a success, since the deputies commissioned the junta to encourage other teachers to present equal samples of their application and of their disciples' achievement.

It was decided to cancel the school for natives, maintained in Chillán by two Franciscan missionaries, in which two thousand pesos were spent on the education of the natives, proposing instead that the natives be admitted and supported in the state schools, receiving the same benefits, so that they "forget the shocking distinction that keeps them in the unjust dejection and hatred towards a people of which they should be a part".

Juan Egaña, before being included as a deputy, proposed on October 24 to Congress a plan that consisted of founding a vast establishment for students of Santiago and regions, under the direction of the best teachers, and including the study of sciences, until then ignored in the country. The work received the approval of the concurrence and it was agreed to disseminate it.

Another elaborate plan came from the head of Camilo Henríquez, who proposed to Congress a plan for the organization of education that he had devised. Teaching was to be divided into three sections, physical sciences and mathematics, moral sciences, and languages and literature. The Congress listened to these plans and resolved that they be added to the other antecedents relating to the projected renewal of studies.

=== Freedom of the womb ===
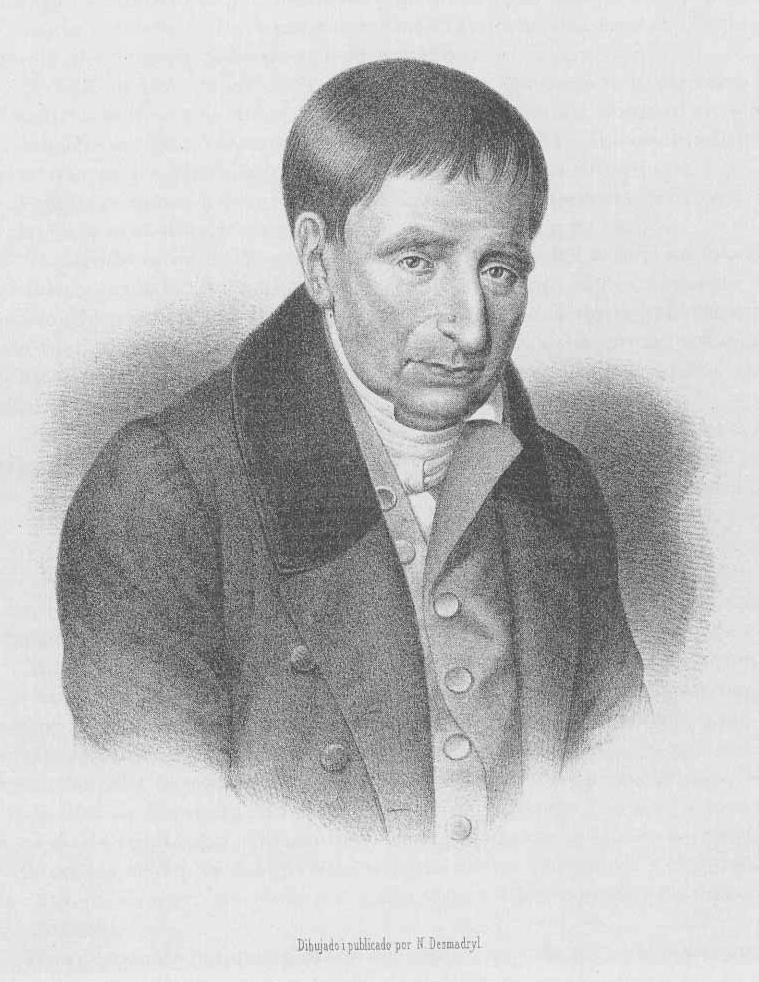
The enlightened Manuel de Salas was the great promoter of the law of freedom of wombs

The most important project promoted during this period was the freedom of wombs, promoted by Manuel de Salas, which decreed that all men born in Chile were free, regardless of the conditions of their parents, prohibited the introduction of slaves into the country and recognized as free men those who, while in transit through Chilean territory, stayed in the country for more than six months. Slavery was not as economically important in Chile as in other Spanish American nations, and many of the patriots even voluntarily freed their slaves in order to hasten the complete disappearance of slavery. Despite its seemingly blameless spirit, the law met with fierce resistance from royalist sectors.

On the other hand, some slave owners, with the help of parish priests, falsified birth certificates so that newborns would count as slaves, or hid adult slaves when the time came for forced conscription.

== Dissolution of Congress ==
After the coup, relations between José Miguel Carrera and the Larraín family deteriorated rapidly. Joaquín Larraín boasted that his family held all the presidencies of the institutions, although it was the Carrera's who had the military strength.

To change the course of events, the Carrera family initiated a new conspiracy, which obtained the support of the royalists who naively believed that the brothers would restore the old regime, after promising to place the father of the family, Ignacio de la Carrera, at the head of the government.

The coup took place on November 15 under the command of Juan José, who after dominating the capital militarily, sent messages to the Congress and the junta, demanding their presence in an assembly to listen to the voice of the people. The president of the Congress, believing that the movement did not have great transcendence, prepared to reunite the deputies, not acting in the same way as the junta, who tried to dissuade Juan José of his attitude, not achieving his purpose.

Juan José Carrera's rejection of the junta's parliaments provoked fear in Congress of a possible restoration of the old government, and although he tried to resist the demand for a popular assembly, he had to give in and publish a proclamation summoning the neighborhood to hold one.

The assembly, which consisted of a mass of about 300 people, demanded primarily a change in government personnel and the suspension of the banishments decreed after the coup of September 4.

The Congress discussed the petitions heatedly, although Juan José Carrera's guarantee that the new institutions would be sustained relieved the congressmen, who nevertheless continued discussing until nine o'clock at night, when they decided to suspend the session and continue it the following day.

On the 16th, the executive junta presented its resignation to Congress, and the names of the new governing body were re-elected in the midst of the popular assembly. The positions were left to Gaspar Marín, Bernardo O'Higgins and José Miguel Carrera, the latter being the president of the junta. The Congress could do nothing to prevent Carrera's ascension, but trusted that Marín and O'Higgins would give him enough weight, so they managed to get them to accept their positions despite their initial resistance.

After the incidents of the 15th and 16th, the Congress continued to function, but lost most of its political weight. Its sessions were limited to topics of little interest, and even the minutes were no longer recorded, after Manuel de Salas resigned as secretary.

To consolidate his power, Carrera only needed to dissolve the Congress, giving the next blow of force on December 2. That day the Congress was in normal session, when the soldiers showed up with cannons pointed at the building where they were sitting and with sentries who had orders not to let the deputies leave. The Congress was demanded to dissolve, and after some deliberations, it was accepted to resign.

The Congress is suspended until the provinces of the kingdom are notified. It need not be a permanent body; therefore, there is no obstacle to suspension. The legislative power is essentially incommunicable by the representatives, and can only be so by the will of those who confer it. All other powers, including those requested by the troops, remain in the executive power.

They were dejected, so Carrera presented on the 4th a long manifesto, in which he gave the reasons for the suspension of the Congress, arguing the inopportune convocation to a Congress, in view that the country had not yet matured for an absolute independence, a flawed election because the people were not given an adequate representation and that it was the result more of influences than of the popular will, besides what he judged was an inefficient performance and that was leading the country towards ruin.

From that moment on, José Miguel Carrera and his brothers exercised an absolute predominance in the government, in spite of the existence of two other members with whom he formed the junta of government, which would lead to a radicalization of the self-government movement that would culminate in a process of national emancipation.

== Members of the First National Congress ==
=== Proprietary deputies ===
District	Deputy	Political party
Copiapó	Juan José Echeverría	Patriot
Huasco	Ignacio José de Aránguiz	Moderate
Coquimbo	Presbyter Marcos Gallo Vergara	Monarchism
Coquimbo	Manuel Antonio Recabarren	Patriot
Illapel	Joaquín Gandarillas Romero	Moderate
Petorca	Estanislao Portales Larraín	Moderate
Aconcagua	José Santos Mascayano	Patriot
Los Andes	Francisco Ruiz-Tagle	Moderate
Quillota	José Antonio Ovalle y Vivar	Patriot
Valparaíso	Agustín Vial Santelices	Patriot
Santiago	Joaquín Echeverría y Larraín	Patriot
Santiago	Count of Quinta Alegre Juan Agustín Alcalde Bascuñán	Moderate
Santiago	Agustín Eyzaguirre Arechavala	Moderate
Santiago	Francisco Javier de Errázuriz Aldunate	Monarchism
Santiago	José Miguel Infante	Patriot
Santiago	José Santiago Portales	Moderate
Santiago	José Nicolás de la Cerda de Santiago Concha	Moderate
Santiago	Juan Antonio Ovalle Silva	Moderate
Santiago	Fray Pedro Manuel Chaparro	Monarchism
Santiago	Juan José de Goycoolea	Monarchism
Santiago	Gabriel José Tocornal Jiménez	Moderate
Santiago	Domingo Díaz de Salcedo y Muñoz	Monarchism
Melipilla	José de Fuenzalida y Villela	Moderate
Rancagua	Fernando Errázuriz Aldunate	Monarchism
San Fernando	José María Ugarte y Castelblanco	Monarchism
San Fernando	José María de Rozas Lima y Melo	Patriot
Curicó	Martín Calvo Encalada	Moderate
Talca	Manuel Pérez de Cotapos y Guerrero	Monarchism
Talca	Mateo Vergara	Monarchism
Linares	Juan Esteban Fernández del Manzano	Patriot
Cauquenes	Presbyter Juan Antonio Soto y Aguilar	Monarchism
Itata	Manuel de Salas y Corvalán	Patriot
Chillán	Antonio Urrutia de Mendiburu	Patriot
Chillán	Pedro Ramón de Arriagada	Patriot
Concepción	Conde La Marquina Andrés Alcázar y Díez de Navarrete	Monarchism
Concepción	Canon Agustín Ramón Urrejola Leclerc	Monarchism
Concepción	Juan Cerdán Campaña	Monarchism
Rere	Luis de la Cruz y Goyeneche	Patriot
Los Ángeles	Bernardo O'Higgins Riquelme	Patriot
Puchacay	Juan Pablo Fretes	Patriot
Osorno	Manuel Fernández Hortelano	Monarchism

=== Alternate Deputies ===
District	Alternate Deputy
Copiapó	José Antonio Astorga
Huasco	José Jiménez de Guzmán
Coquimbo	
Illapel	
Petorca	
Aconcagua	
Los Andes	José Manuel Canto
Quillota	Francisco Pérez
Valparaíso	
Santiago
Santiago	Miguel Morales Calvo Encalada
Santiago	José Manuel Lecaros
Santiago	Lorenzo Fuenzalida Corbalán
Santiago	José Antonio Astorga
Santiago	José Agustín Jaraquemada
Santiago	José Antonio Rosales
Santiago	Benito Vargas Prado
Santiago	Antonio Aránguiz Mendieta
Santiago	Francisco Valdivieso Vargas
Santiago	Juan Francisco León de la Barra
Santiago	Manuel Valdés Valdés
Santiago	Francisco Antonio de la Lastra
Melipilla	José Ignacio Eyzaguirre
Rancagua	Isidoro Errázuriz
San Fernando	Diego Elizondo Prado
Curicó	Diego Valenzuela
Talca	Juan de Dios Vial del Río
Linares	
Cauquenes	Fray Domingo de San Cristóbal
Chillán	
Itata	Presbyter Joaquín Larraín y Salas
Concepción	Luis Urrejola Leclerc
Concepción	Francisco González Palma
Concepción	Manuel Rioseco
Rere	Presbyter Gabriel Bachiller
Los Ángeles	José María Benavente
Puchacay	Fray Camilo Henríquez
Osorno	Francisco Ramón de Vicuña

=== Presidents of Congress ===
President	Vice President	Period
Juan Martínez de Rozas (Note: He presided over the first session as accidental chairman of the board.)		July 4
Juan Antonio Ovalle	Martín Blanco Encalada	July 4 - July 20
Martín Calvo Encalada	Agustín Urrejola	July 20 - August 5
Manuel Pérez Cotapos	Juan Cerdán Campaña	August 5 - August 20
Juan Cerdán Campaña	Agustín Eyzaguirre	August 20 - September 20
Joaquín Larraín	Manuel Antonio Recabarren	September 20 - October 19
Juan Pablo Fretes	José María Rozas	October 19 - November 22
Joaquín Echeverría Larraín	Hipólito de Villegas	November 22 - December 2

=== Secretary of Congress ===
Secretaries	Period
Francisco Ruiz-Tagle Portales (accidental secretary)	July 4
José Francisco de Echaurren Diego Antonio de Elionzo y Prado	July 4 - July 30
Diego Antonio de Elionzo y Prado Agustín de Vial Santelices	July 30 - August 10
Agustín de Vial Santelices José Miguel Infante	August 10 - September 12
Agustín de Vial Santelices Manuel de Salas	September 12 - November 15

Preceded by Government Junta of Chile (1810)	National Congress of Government of the Kingdom of Chile; July 4, 1811 - December 2, 1811	Succeeded by Government Junta of Chile (August 1811)

== See also ==
- National Congress of Chile

== Bibliography ==
1. Archivo de don Bernardo O'Higgins (in Spanish). Vol. I (Editorial Nascimento ed.). Santiago de Chile. 1946.
2. Barros Arana, Diego (1897). Historia General de Chile (in Spanish). Vol. XVIII. Santiago de Chile: Imprenta Cervantes.
3. Eyzaguirre, Jaime (1960). Archivo epistolar de la familia Eyzaguirre 1747-1854 (in Spanish). Buenos Aires: s.n.
4. Gay, Claudio (1859). Historia de Chile (in Spanish). París: En casa del autor; Santiago: Museo de Historia Natural de Santiago.
5. Gay, Claudio (1964). Conversaciones históricas de Claudio Gay, con algunos de los testigos y actores de la Independencia de Chile, 1808-1826 (in Spanish). Santiago, Chile: Editorial Andrés Bello.
6. Letelier, Valentín (1886–1908). Sesiones de los cuerpos lejislativos de la República de Chile: 1811-1845 (in Spanish). Vol. I. Santiago de Chile: Imprenta Cervantes.
7. Martínez, Fray Melchor. Memoria Histórica Sobre la Revolución de Chile Desde el Cautiverio de Fernando VII Hasta 1814. Escrita por Orden del Rey por Fray Melchor Martínez (in Spanish).
8. Roldán, Alcibíades. Las primeras asambleas nacionales: años de 1811 a 1814 (in Spanish). Santiago de Chile: Imprenta Cervantes.
9. Poblete Draper, Luis Ernesto (1962). El Primer Congreso Nacional, Memoria de Prueba para optar al grado de licenciado en Ciencias Jurídicas y Sociales (in Spanish). Santiago de Chile: Editorial Universitaria.
10. Talavera, Manuel Antonio (1937). Revoluciones de Chile: discurso histórico, diario Imparcial, de los sucesos memorables acaecidos en Santiago de Chile, desde el 25 de mayo de 1810 hasta el 20 de noviembre de 1811 (in Spanish). Santiago de Chile: Talleres Gráficos Cóndor.
11. Valencia Avaria, Luis (1986). Anales de la República: textos constitucionales de Chile y registro de los ciudadanos que han integrado los poderes ejecutivo y legislativo desde 1810 (in Spanish) (2 ed.). Santiago de Chile: Editorial Andrés Bello.
12. VV.AA. (1900). Colección de historiadores i documentos relativos a la Independencia de Chile (in Spanish). Vol. II, IX, XIX and XX. Santiago de Chile: Imprenta Cervantes.
