= September 1811 Chilean coup d'état =

The Revolution of September 4, 1811, also known as Golpe del 4 de septiembre (September 4 Coup) or simply as Primer golpe de Carrera (Carrera's First Coup), was a military movement in Chile. Its main objective was to change the conformation of the nascent National Congress, transforming it into a Congress more inclined to separatist ideas. The movement had as military leaders the Carrera brothers, among them José Miguel, who later became the main character of the so-called Patria Vieja (1810-1814). On the political side, the main instigators of the coup movement were the Larraín family (also called Los Ochocientos or Ottomans) with Fray Joaquín Larraín at their head.

The revolution of September 4 (Note: This is at least how the sources call it: Fray Melchor Martínez, José Miguel Carrera, the Sessions of the Legislative Bodies (official document) and Diego Barros Arana.) was quickly imposed before the Congress and after that Carrera, presenting a list of petitions on behalf of the people of Santiago, forced the legislators to accede to most of the requests, whose main impact resided in suspending from their positions a group of men considered inclined to the royalist ideas (called Saracens) (Note: The term Saracen was only used at the time to describe those who supported royalist ideas. However, its pejorative use can be ruled out, since even authors such as Manuel Antonio Talavera and Fray Melchor Martínez defined themselves as Saracens, together with those who were still loyal to the Spanish monarchy. Of course, those who most used the term would be the patriots, as clearly demonstrated by the case of Carrera in his Military Diary, who used the term profusely.) or in their absence moderates, and changing them for men recognized for their patriotic ideas. This was the first of the four coups d'état that characterized the political life of Carrera, who also resorted to this formula on November 15 and December 2 of the same year, and on July 23, 1814. In addition, this military movement had the peculiarity of being the first successful coup d'état in the history of Chile. (Note: If Figueroa's mutiny is not considered a coup d'état, then this military movement is definitely the first coup d'état in Chilean history.)

== Background ==
=== Carrera's arrival in Chile ===
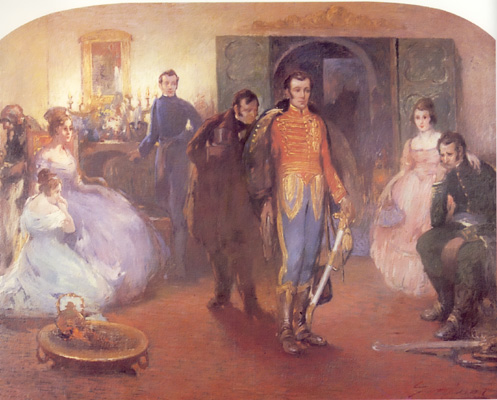
The Carrera brothers were the ones who, using the military power they controlled, gave an important impulse to install independence ideas within the process of emancipation from the Spanish Empire.

On April 17, after having fought with the troops of the King of Spain against the French, (Note: Winning the medal of honor given to the soldiers who fought in the battle of Talavera.) and aware of the political course that the Kingdom of Chile was taking (his father had been a member of the first Government Junta), José Miguel Carrera embarked on the English warship "Standard" to his homeland, arriving at the port of Valparaíso on July 25. He was received in Valparaíso by Governor Juan Mackenna, who informed him of the events taking place in Santiago, and immediately set sail for the capital city, arriving on the night of the 26.

However, upon his arrival in Santiago, he found the news that a revolutionary movement, led by his brother, Juan José Carrera, was brewing in the coming hours:

That night, after the embrace of my family, I retired to sleep in the company of my brother Don Juan José, who somehow imposed on me the situation of my country. He told me that he was arriving at the time of a revolution that would take place at ten o'clock on the 28th. (Note: It was actually scheduled for the 27th) It was actually scheduled for the 27th. It was aimed at removing some individuals from Congress, Commander of Artillery Francisco Javier Reina, and I don't remember what other things. Those directing the work were Martínez de Rozas and Larraines, joined by Antonio Álvarez Jonte. It seemed to me that the project contained a great deal of ambition and decisions detrimental to the cause and to my brothers, who were the executors. I begged them to postpone that deadline until my return from Valparaíso, where I was to return so that Fleming could come to see the capital. He offered to do so and complied, in spite of the fact that in the morning many of those invited were present for the purpose.

Thus, Carrera left again for Valparaíso to meet with Charles Elphinstone Fleming, who by then expected the payment of a tribute to alleviate the Spanish war effort. Upon his return to Santiago, on August 11 or 12, Carrera began to learn about the revolutionary plans of the until then patriot minority (or exalted), who, encouraged by Antonio Álvarez Jonte, delegate of the Buenos Aires Junta before the Chilean Junta, sought in the Carrera brothers the managers of the military movement. (Note: According to Diego Barros Arana, in his Historia General de Chile, the instigators of the military movement were: the priest Joaquín Larraín, Juan Enrique Rosales, Carlos Correa, Gaspar Marín, Nicolás Matorras and Antonio Álvarez Jonte.) However, at first, José Miguel Carrera, indicated to his brothers to move away from the intentions of the exalted ones, and tried to delve into the motivations of the patriots to carry out the movement, to which they responded:

I asked why and for what purpose such a resounding revolution was intended; I was told: The Congress and part of the troops are in the power of inept men and enemies of the cause. All the sane part of the people clamor to remedy this evil and it is not possible because there is no freedom; it is necessary to resort to the force commanded by the good patriots, which is the only hope that remains. We will all sacrifice our lives to save the motherland.

==== Attempts to stop the revolution ====
Upon learning of the intentions, Carrera at first suggested to gather the people together with the Grenadiers to request the corresponding measures, but it was indicated that the people were too timid and would not get together. Then Carrera indicated that the best thing would be for the healthy part of the people to sign the demands to the Congress and that he, in command of the Grenadiers, would support the plan.

In spite of Carrera's commitment to the exalted, he hesitated a lot before launching the coup d'état. As he mentions in his Military Diary, it seemed to him that he should touch all the possible means to avoid a harmful step, and for this he personally went to talk to the president of the National Congress, Manuel Pérez de Cotapos, who however did not attend to his requests to comply peacefully with the demands. José Miguel Carrera warned Pérez for his refusal:

You have compromised me; fear the results of such an imprudent step.

=== Congress' work prior to September 4 ===
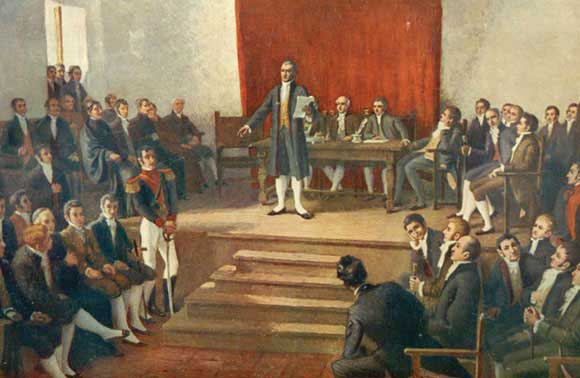
The First National Congress of Chile was initially trapped in the disputes between the exalted and the Saracens. The latter, together with the moderates, were opposed to breaking with the metropolis, although they agreed to approve some advances, such as freedom of trade.

The National Congress, established on July 4, 1811, was formed mainly by parliamentarians who were either adherents to the royalist ideas, or who were indifferent to the actions that were taking place. This led the patriots, led by Juan Martínez de Rozas, to continually challenge their political opponents, the first and main dispute being the modification of the original intention of electing 6 deputies for Santiago to 12, favoring the royalist intentions, since except for the first majority, which was obtained by the patriot Joaquín Echeverría Larraín, the rest of the seats were awarded to royalists and above all to indifferent ones.

==== Patriot triumphs and defeats in Congress ====
However, in spite of being in minority, the exalted sector of the Congress tried to obstruct within its capacities the proposals of royalists and moderates, but without obtaining many credits. After the failed military attempt that the exalted had prepared for July 27, which was not carried out due to the absence of Juan José Carrera with his troops who followed his brother's advice, the patriots focused their forces on preventing the election of a new executive board in the Congress, since they knew that they would be defeated again by the majority.

A great triumph was achieved by the patriots when they avoided sending funds to Captain Fleming to send them to Spain with the purpose of sustaining the war that this country was facing against the Napoleonic army. However, they received a clear and convincing defeat when the Congress rejected the proposal of Manuel de Salas to divide the territory and reorganize it, giving Coquimbo the recognition of Intendancy as well as Santiago and Concepción, thus facilitating an eventual representation of Rozas in the area. After the rejection of the Congress to the proposal, and in view of the impossibility of carrying out measures to give the Kingdom a more patriotic course, on August 9, the 12 exalted deputies withdrew from the Congress arguing how scandalous the increase from 6 to 12 deputies to represent Santiago was.

==== Rozas' sinking and his march to the south ====
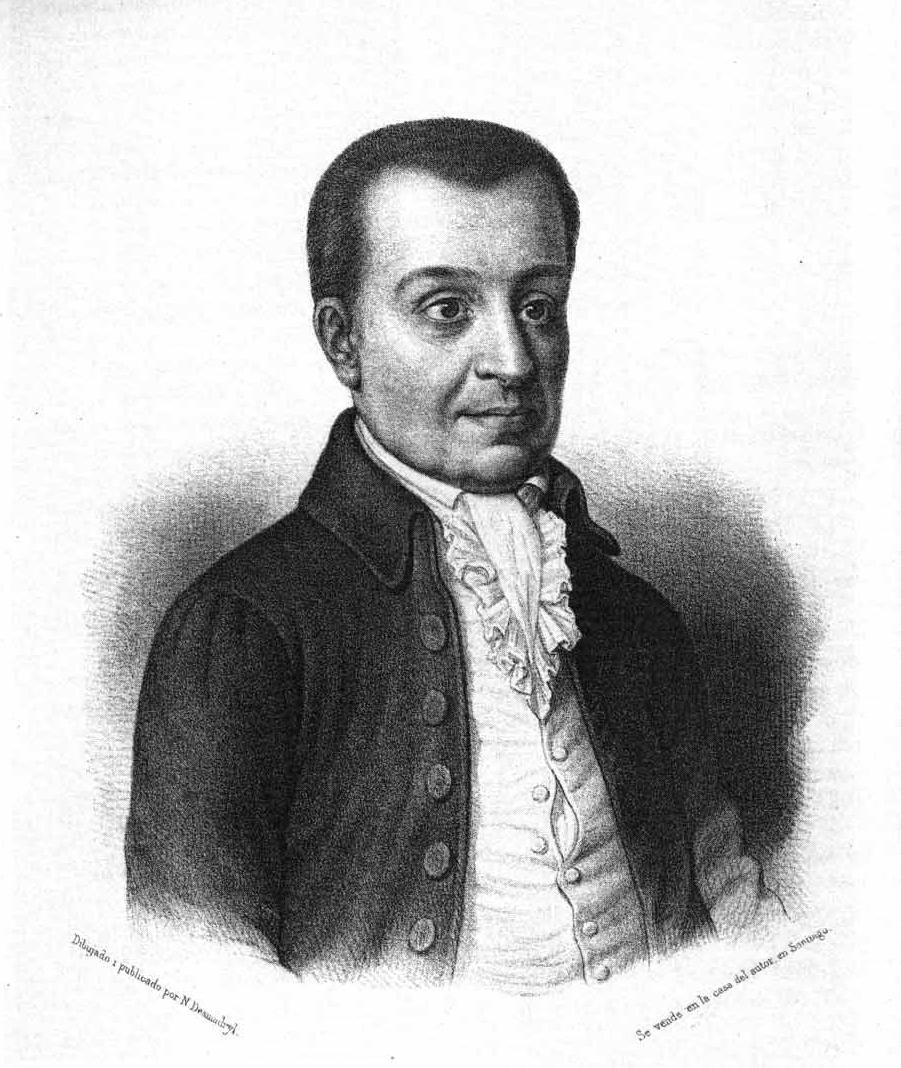
Juan Martínez de Rozas was for a long time the leader of the exalted faction. However, the continuous erosion of his figure and the inability to turn the hand of the realistic and moderate majority, made him give up continuing the political struggle in Santiago and so he traveled to Concepción

There are many authors who interpret the Chilean political scene at the end of 1810 and the beginning of 1811 as a struggle between rocists and anti-rocists instead of following the traditional interpretation that speaks of a struggle between exalted or radicals against royalists or conservatives. Martínez de Rozas is postulated as the leader of a faction desirous of a strong government, and that in great part, will join the later government of O'Higgins. (Note: Men like Hipólito Villegas or José Gregorio Argomedo.) Opposing them were those who would later become liberals and radicals, in favor of greater popular participation and limiting governmental powers.

However, Rozas was a man not very well liked by the Santiago aristocracy and they questioned a series of actions he had carried out during the last year, such as the Scorpion scandal, his close alliance with Álvarez Jonte and his presumed responsibility in the Figueroa mutiny. However, in the elections for the conformation of the national Congress, the Rocist side was defeated in the crucial election held in Santiago, (Note: Rozas had already been defeated in Concepción by the royalist candidates.) where the victory was even more resounding due to the increase of representatives that the city of Santiago suffered, going from 6 to 12 members. This motivated the repeated complaints of the faction more inclined to pro-independence ideas, a faction already led by the Larraínes or Ochocientos, who had displaced the defeated Martínez de Rozas in the control of the opposition to the anti-rocists.

Martínez de Rozas fell even more in disgrace after his failed attempt to resort to the realization of a military conspiracy to impose his ideas, but on July 27 only a few individuals had gathered and neither Juan José Carrera nor his Grenadiers had shown up. Seeing all the doors closed, the most radical and rocist deputies withdrew from the legislative assembly on August 9. With the change in the course of the revolution, Martinez de Rozas traveled to the south to carry out a revolutionary movement in Concepcion, which would take place on September 5, without knowing the events that had already taken place in the city of Santiago on the 4th, and which were led by the Carrera brothers.

== Military coup ==
=== The seizure of the artillery barracks ===
On Wednesday, September 4, a little before noon, José Miguel Carrera arrived at the Plazuela de la Moneda (today's Plaza de la Constitución). There he had arrived riding a horse and dressed in the garb of a sergeant major of the Hussars of Galicia regiment, he set out to carry out an elaborate plan that he had designed with his brothers and his haranguers. However, nothing went according to plan. According to the account of Friar Melchor Martinez, everything would have started earlier, at 6 a.m:

On the 4th, from 6 o'clock in the morning, seventy Grenadiers entered in parade and in disguise at the house of Carrera, where a plentiful lunch and plenty to drink were served, after which diligence the object of their meeting was discovered, offering them great prizes if they would force and seize the Artillery park; inflaming them with the false species that this corps, united with the four quartered companies of the Regiment of the King, had prepared to assault the Grenadier barracks and put them all to the sword.

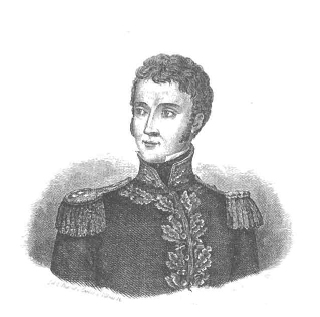
Juan José Carrera was in charge of the action of the seventy grenadiers. The only death of the entire revolution occurred as a result of one of his shots

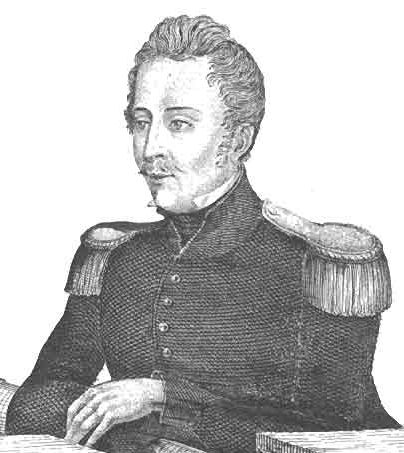
Luis Carrera, captain of artillery, was in charge of locking the officer on duty at the barracks in his room to ensure, together with other officers, that the guards did not take possession of their weapons.

However, at about noon, José Miguel Carrera arrived with his brothers outside the artillery barracks with his impeccable and luxurious clothing, riding his horse, which attracted the attention of all the sentries who were on guard. The guards gathered in the western sector of the square to witness the skillful tricks that Carrera performed with his horse, thus neglecting the barracks. At that moment, the Carrera brothers, who had engaged in a jocular conversation with the officer in charge and the rest of the barracks guard, asked the officer of the guard to give them a piece of paper of recommendation to send some horses to the farm of a brother of theirs. Although the officer apologized saying that he did not have an inkwell, the Carrera family begged the officer so much to write the obituary that he agreed to go write it in a nearby room. Moments after the officer entered the room, the artillery captain Luis Carrera, locked the room to leave the officer locked up and together with other officers stood in front of the checkpoint's armament with his sword drawn to prevent any soldier from taking his rifle.

It was at that moment when the clock struck twelve, and, as planned, seventy men of the grenadier (Note: Carrera speaks of sixty men, Martínez and Barros Arana speak of seventy.) battalion came out of their hiding place in the house of Ignacio de la Carrera, which was right behind the artillery barracks. At the same time, artillery sergeant Ramón Picarte, who was part of the conspiracy and acted as a spy inside the barracks, suddenly took his weapon from the sentry at the door of the barracks. Upon noticing what was happening, the sergeant on duty, Juan Gonzalez shouted "Treason! or "This is treason", (Note: The version varies according to the source: According to Barros Arana, what was said would have been "¡Traición!", but according to Martínez, what González shouted was "¡Esta es traición!".) without being able to do anything else because Juan Jose Carrera shot him dead on the spot. (Note: However, Gonzalez's widow and children would have been favored with her husband's salary, according to Carrera's Diary: The widow of the dead sergeant was granted her husband's entire salary, for herself and her children during her entire life; it took a great deal to obtain this decree from the new rulers.) Faced with the defenselessness of the guard and the quick maneuver of the Carrera family, the artillery barracks was taken and with the passing of the minutes, pickets of grenadiers gathered there and formed under the orders of the Carrera family and the officers who had directed the actions. Immediately José Miguel Carrera dispatched Juan J. Zorrilla with 12 men to detain commander Reina, and thus prevent the revolution from being hindered.

== Political coup ==
=== Requests to Congress ===
Once the military coup had been consummated with the seizure of the artillery barracks, José Miguel Carrera organized his artillerymen and grenadiers in a line plus four cannons that he took from the barracks and set out for the main square (today's Plaza de Armas). During the morning, the Congress had been in session as usual and they were unaware of the movements that had just taken place in La Moneda. However, shouts of "Revolution! Revolution!" were quickly heard in the square and the grenadier officers who were guarding the doors of Congress, (Note: Bernardo Vélez and Julián Fretes) in collusion with the Carrera family, fulfilled the mission they had previously received: to close the doors of Congress so that no legislator would leave the room.

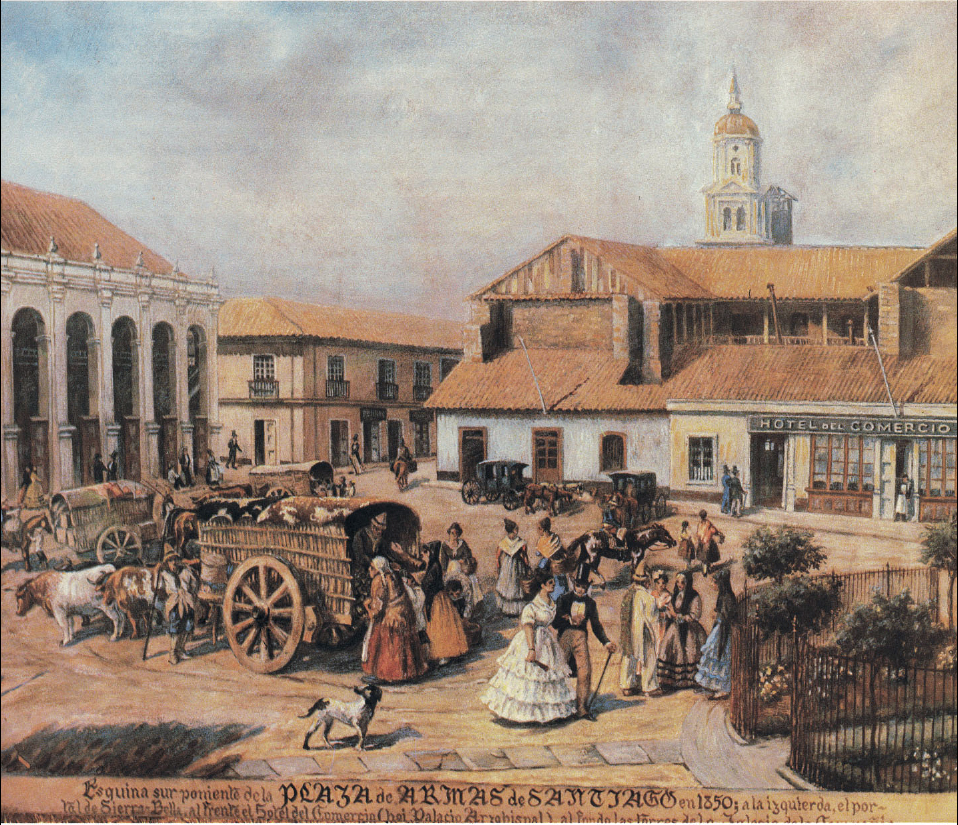
It was in the Plaza de Armas of Santiago where the people gathered to accept the proposals that Carrera delivered to Congress. According to the chronicler Manuel Antonio Talavera, the factious mob consisted of no more than 30 people

At that moment, José Miguel Carrera's troops arrived and did not face any kind of resistance. Even the militias in charge of protecting the congressmen laid down their arms when they saw the rebels with their artillery pieces, so they were sent to their homes by the insurrectionists. Before the expectation of the congressmen and the people that began to accumulate in the square, that according to the chronicler Manuel Antonio Talavera were a mob of between 25 to 30 factious(not the one that the Larraínes had assured to Carrera), José Miguel Carrera got off his horse and entered the plenary of the Congress. He demanded that the congressmen listen to the people, but the president of the corporation asked him to accompany him to listen to the petitions, and there were curious anecdotes, such as those expressed by Carrera in his Diary:

When I appeared in the hall of Congress after agreeing to the intimation, they begged me (particularly the President Don Juan Zerdán) to stay in their company to avoid insults and so that I could understand the people; I agreed. Soon after, some of the deputies, who were in a hurry to eat, said: "Let us hear once and for all what the people want. Don José Miguel Carrera can demand that they make their requests in writing to avoid confusion".

When Carrera came out again to the square, he communicated to those gathered the intention of the Congress to listen to their petitions. (Note: On this point there is no consensus among the sources. While Carrera says that after entering the Congress he went out to look for the people's petitions, others, like Martínez (and Barros Arana) say that Carrera immediately burst into the Congress hall with the list of petitions.) In the act arrived Fray Joaquín Larraín, Carlos Correa, Francisco Ramírez and part of the exalted deputies that had retired on August 9, who gave Carrera a paper containing the petitions of the people, where the petitions that the Larraínes had predesigned were found. When Carrera surveyed the petitions with the opinions of those gathered, it happened that for some unhappy people for whom everything was the same, each one of the petitions was given a viva. The petitions that later, back in Congress, Carrera will impose are the following: (Note: Martinez mentions that there were 13 petitions, Egaña presents only 8, Carrera however presents a text containing the petitions, he does not present them point by point.)

.

1. That the number of deputies from Santiago be reduced to seven, and that of the province of Concepción, which had more, to two, leaving the rest of the provinces with one representative.
2. That the deputies of Santiago, Infante, Portales, Ovalle, Díaz Muñoz, Chaparro, Tocornal and Goycolea be separated; and to complete the seven that were to remain, Larraín and Correa. (Note: Carrera, in the list he had, should have included Alcalde among those expelled, however: I did not know anyone except through those at the meetings; but I did not fail to recognize the part that the faction had. It occurred to me when I handed in the sheet containing the petitions that Eyzaguirre, because of his gold buckles, powder, fat cane, scarlet cape and velvet shoes, had to be more Gothic than Mayor; that is why I erased Mayor with my pencil and put Eyzaguirre (...) This was my sin and the only intrigue of that day; everything else was the work of the Ottoman House. However, his intention did not prosper, since he was the only congressman whom the Congress refused to expel.)
3. That the deputy of Osorno, Fernández, be separated.
4. That the current Vocales del Poder Ejecutivo be removed, and five be named, which were Encalada, Rosales, Rozas (and due to his absence Benavente), Mackenna and Marín, Secretaries Vial and Argomedo.
5. That no friar could be a deputy, nor be elected, or admitted to this position, subjects who are not of proven adherence to the system.
6. That the Fiscal Agent Sanchez, and the City Attorney Rodriguez; the Aldermen Cruz and Mata, and the Government Clerk Borquez be separated from their jobs.
7. Don Manuel Fernández will be confined to Combarbalá, Don Domingo Díaz Muñoz and Don Juan Antonio Ovalle to their estates, for six years; and if any plot or infraction is understood, they will be put to the sword as traitors to the King and the homeland. Don Antonio Mata to his farm and Don Juan Manuel Cruz to Tucapel, Infante to Melipilla.
8. That Don Ignacio Carrera be named Brigadier. (Note: Carrera never mentions that among the petitions was the appointment of his father as Brigadier.)
9. That the Corps of Patriots that had been discussed in the first meeting be formed.
10. That Don Francisco Lastra be named Governor of Valparaíso in the vacancy of Don Juan Mackenna, who was removed for Vocal de la junta.

=== Carrera's withdrawal and parliamentary debate ===
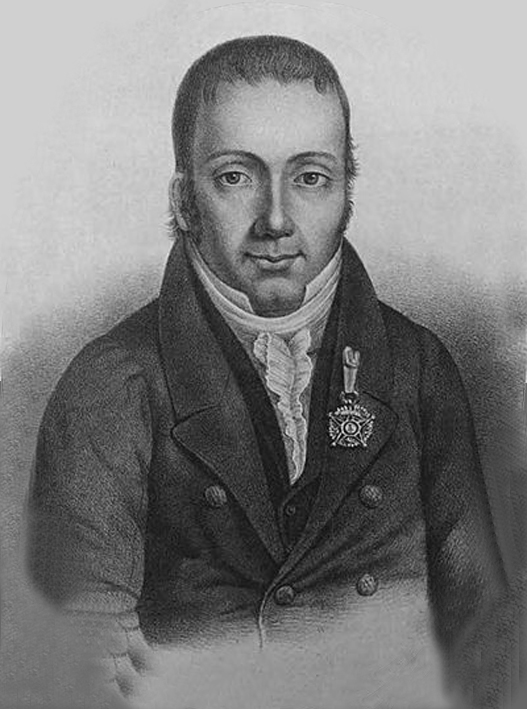
Juan Egaña saw that the movement used the figure of the people only as an excuse to achieve power

The presentation of the petitions to Congress immediately generated discord in the collegiate body, since not a few realized the political imbroglio that this entailed, as well as the complexity for a realistic and moderate parliament to accept such radical proposals. Some, like Juan Egaña, saw that the insurgents were using the people as an excuse to carry out their movement, others argued that only the Congress was representative of the people and tried to assert their rights. But Martínez explains how the congressmen went from defending their rights to fearing for their lives:

After reading the popular writing, it was seen that it contained 13 articles or petitions of difficult execution, in such an anguish of time and several views and opinions were raised, which observed by the seditious ones from the antechamber, they entered a second time with the former Mercedarian Larrain, Don Carlos Correa, Don Gregorio Argomedo, and Commissioner Carrera, and with imperious voices they urged the Congress to omit discussions and doubts in what the people were requesting, and to promptly sanction it to the letter, with the understanding that they were not allowed freedom to leave the room without the complete granting of all that was requested.

The pressure exerted by the grenadier battalion that approached the Congress hall when they began to protest generated immediate fear, which was mitigated by the assurances about their safety that Carrera made to the Congress as long as the proposals were accepted. Moments later, Carrera, tired of acting as interpreter between Cerdán and the people, withdrew from the room leaving Larraín and Correa, who continued with the task of making the petitions concrete. By three o'clock in the afternoon, the creation of an Executive Board made up of Juan Enrique Rosales, Juan Martínez de Rozas, Martín Calvo Encalada, Juan Mackenna and Gaspar Marín, was announced to those gathered in the square. However, the discussions of the proposals would have extended until 11 o'clock at night, putting an end to a whole day of unforeseen actions and situations that would change the until then undecided course of the pro-independence revolution.

== The Rozas revolution in Concepción ==
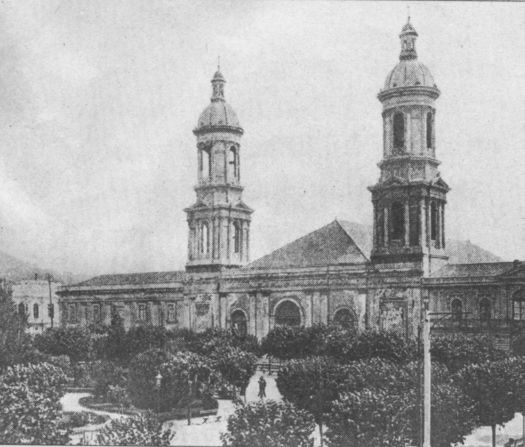
Martínez de Rozas marched to Concepción to promote his exalted ideas. In this city his speech would have great acceptance and on September 5 an open town hall would be held rejecting the twelve deputies for Santiago.

Rozas, who had left Santiago on August 13 when he saw that the supremacy of the moderate and royalist deputies was insurmountable, arrived in Concepcion on the night of the 25th, being received in a great manner by his friends. He quickly put into action his plan to spread the injustices of the Congress with the appointment of the twelve deputies for Santiago and emphasized the mere observance of the deputies for Concepción. When Rozas gave the news of the resounding withdrawal of the twelve exalted deputies, Fray Antonio Orihuela denounced the intentions of the Santiago aristocracy to keep the people in servitude, and his words were deeply heard by the patriots of Concepción who asked the Governor to call an open Cabildo, which was held on September 5, without knowledge of the events that had occurred the day before in Santiago. In this Cabildo, the representatives of Concepción were stripped of their powers for having allowed the entry of the twelve deputies from Santiago, and new representatives were elected, among them, Fray Orihuela himself, a fervent patriot.

In addition, Concepción called on neighboring parties in the province not to recognize Santiago and to join its just cause, along with promoting local boards to review the conduct of their deputies. Thus, in some cases, as in Los Angeles, instead of deposing their representative, the people praised and reelected the patriot deputy Bernardo O'Higgins as their representative.

On September 16, the news of this meeting was known in Santiago, awakening the fear of a rupture within the country. However, when the reasons for the southern revolution were known, it was immediately known that both movements, that of Santiago and Concepción, were inspired by the same intentions, so the fears disappeared and the deputies of Concepción were received, being Fray Antonio Orihuela the one in charge of making peace with the new Congress. In this way the patriot movement, instinctively and in parallel, had managed to give two fierce blows to the status quo that prevailed in the Congress. Melchor Martínez gives an account of the feeling that took hold among the royalists after learning more concretely the news about Concepción and thus noting the absolute triumph of the patriotic cause:

A simple reading of the foregoing writing clearly demonstrates the aims and means of the whole spirit of innovation that animated the factious, removing the hypocritical veil of adherence to Ferdinand the Seventh and other disguises, with which they foolishly and perfidiously cover their projects and trade papers.

== Balance sheet of the revolutionary movement ==
=== The emergence of a new actor: the caudillo ===
It can be established that the great peculiarity of the Revolution of September 4 will have in the political scenario of the young republic will be the irruption of a new actor in the independence movement: the caudillo sustained by military support. Independently of the great progress made by the nation during Carrera's government, since September 4 the presidency of the bayonets will become the new mechanism of power within the republic, turning the rest of the political bodies into mere puppets of Carrera's intentions. This vision of the primacy of military force over politics can be seen in the following words of José Miguel Carrera:

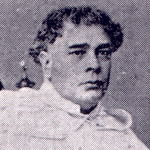
Fray Joaquín Larraín was the one who actually carried out the whole conspiracy against the Congress, and for this he used José Miguel Carrera. Some time later, both characters became enemies and Carrera sent Fray Joaquín Larraín into exile.

Fray Joaquín invited me for a walk in the company of Juan Enrique Rosales, Ramírez, Izquierdo and Pérez. On the way, after a few bottles of punch, Fray Joaquín said: "We have all the presidencies at home: me, President of Congress; my brother-in-law, of the Executive; my nephew, of the Audience; what more could we want?”. I was uncomfortable with his pride, and I unwisely wanted to answer him by asking him who had the presidency of the bayonets. This joke made such a strong impression on him that he demurred, and that night my boldness was criticized in the family, and many of them dictated the precautionary measures to be taken with the Carreras, particularly with me.

=== The primacy of the Ottoman Household ===
Another result derived from this movement will be the primacy that the Larraín (Note: To be more precise, the Larraín-Salas family.) clan will have in the new configuration of the political panorama after the revolution of September 4. As Carrera himself recognizes, they were the ones who carried out the whole background of the military uprising and who took out and put people in Congress thanks to the intervention of the Carrera family, partly due to their greater political management, partly because of their lack of detailed knowledge of the political networks operating in the country. It will be precisely the primacy of the Ottoman household that will outrage José Miguel Carrera as time goes by, since he will notice what the true intentions of the Larraínes were, (Note: This is how he describes it in his diary: I saw him (Friar Joaquín) looking over the Mint, Tobacco Administration, customs and other small jobs of this nature; it is true that the poor little man needed to accommodate his brothers Martín first and Martín second, his nephew-in-law Antonio José de Irisarri and a portion of poor and family-laden relatives.) together with their own ambitions for power. But in spite of the continuous rebuffs that Los Ochocientos made to Carrera, finally the formula of the use of military force had already been tested, which will impel Carrera to get rid of the Larraínes and at the first excuse he found he carried out a new coup d'état to put himself now together with his brothers, and not leave the Ottomans at the head of the government. The quarrels generated between the Carrera and the Larraínes reached such an extreme that some time later Fray Joaquín Larraín was exiled to Petorca by Carrera, and this one in his diary does not hide his bad vision about Fray Larraín.

== Bibliography ==
- Barros Arana, Diego (2002). Historia general de Chile (in Spanish). Vol. VIII. Editorial Universitaria. ISBN 956-11-1566-2.
- Carrera, José Miguel (1900). "Diario Militar de José Miguel Carrera". Colección de historiadores i documentos relativos a la Independencia de Chile (PDF) (in Spanish). Vol. I. Imprenta Cervantes.
- Collier, Simon; Sater, William (1998). Historia de Chile, 1808-1994 (in Spanish). Vol. II. Cambridge University Press. ISBN 84-8323-033-X.
- Egaña, Juan (1900). "Épocas y Hechos Memorables de Chile. 1810-1814". Colección de historiadores i documentos relativos a la Independencia de Chile (in Spanish). Vol. XIX. Imprenta Cervantes.
- Encina, Francisco Antonio (2006). Resumen de la Historia de Chile (Encina-Castedo) (in Spanish). Vol. III. Sociedad Comercial y Editorial Santiago Ltda. ISBN 956-8402-68-3.
- Felstiner, Mary Lowenthal (1976). Kinship Politics in the Chilean Independence Movement (PDF). Hispanic American Historical Review. Archived from the original (PDF) on 2007-09-26.
- Martínez, Fray Melchor (1848). Memoria Histórica Sobre la Revolución de Chile Desde el Cautiverio de Fernando VII Hasta 1814. Escrita por Orden del Rey por Fray Melchor Martínez (in Spanish). Valparaíso: Imprenta Europea.
- Talavera, Manuel Antonio (1937). Revoluciones de Chile: discurso histórico, diario Imparcial, de los sucesos memorables acaecidos en Santiago de Chile, desde el 25 de mayo de 1810 hasta el 20 de noviembre de 1811 (in Spanish). Talleres Gráficos "Cóndor".
- Letelier, Valentín (1889). Sesiones de los cuerpos lejislativos de la República de Chile: 1811-1845 (in Spanish). Vol. XII. Imprenta Cervantes.
