= Postage stamps and postal history of Chile =

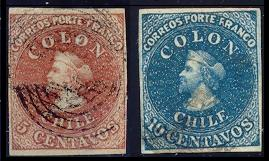
First 1853 issue

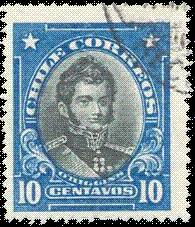
1912 stamp of Bernardo O'Higgins

Chile has produced stamps for national use since 1853. The first stamps of Chile were inscribed Colon Chile.

In 1894, Chile was one of the few countries to issue a stamp for the Avis de réception service.

== See also ==
- List of people on stamps of Chile
