= Government Junta of Chile (August 1811) =

Short-lived Chilean government

Government Junta of Chile (August 10, 1811), also known as the Executive Junta or the Second Government Junta, was the organ established to rule Chile following the convocatory of a National Congress.

== Background ==
After the convocatory of a National Congress on July 4, 1811, the president of the First Junta resigned all the executive powers on the Congress and proceeded to dissolve the Junta. So, from that date until August 10 the sum of all political powers was concentrated in that body.

== Members ==
Position	Name
Members	Colonel Martín Calvo Encalada; Juan José Aldunate; Francisco Javier del Solar
Alternate Member	Juan Miguel Benavente
Assistant	José Antonio Astorga
Secretary	Colonel Manuel Joaquín de Valdivieso

== History ==
The Junta assumed the executive powers by dictate of the National Congress, but soon thereafter Juan Martínez de Rozas decided to challenge its powers and resume his leadership of the revolutionary movement. The Junta lasted only just a little over 3 weeks. On September 4, 1811, in a bloodless coup, the Junta was forced to resign and be replaced by the Superior Junta.

== See also ==
- Chilean Independence
- History of Chile
- List of Government Juntas of Chile
- List of Heads of State
- First Chilean National Congress
