= List of people on the postage stamps of Chile =

List of people on Chilean stamps

This article lists people who have been featured on the postage stamps of Chile. Note that many of these people have been featured on multiple stamps. The following entries list the name of the person, the year they were first featured on a stamp, and a short description of their notability.

This list is complete through to September 2015.

== A ==
- Pedro Aguirre Cerda, president of Chile (1990)
- Arturo Alessandri, president of Chile (1990)
- Jorge Alessandri, president of Chile (1990)
- Diego de Almagro, Spanish conquistador and first European discoverer of Chile (1977)
- Salvador Allende, physician and president of Chile (1990)
- Diego Duble Almeida, soldier (1944)
- Carlos Anwandter, founder of the German School in Valdivia (1958)
- José Luis Araneda, Chilean army officer (1981)
- José Gregorio Argomedo, politician and member of the first national government (1964)
- Claudio Arrau, Chilean pianist (1992)

== B ==
- Lord Baden-Powell, founder of the Boy Scouts (1982)
- José Manuel Balmaceda, president of Chile (1911)
- Diego Barros Arana, Chilean professor, legislator, minister and diplomat (1941)
- Ramón Barros Luco, president of Chile (1983)
- Andrés Bello, Venezuelan diplomat, poet, legislator, philosopher, and educator (1942)
- Francisco Bilbao, Chilean writer, philosopher and liberal politician (1998)
- Manuel Blanco Encalada, president of Chile (1910)
- Clotario Blest, Chilean union leader (1993)
- Simón Bolívar, Venezuelan military and political leader (1974)
- Marta Brunet, Chilean writer (1998)
- Manuel Bulnes, president of Chile (1911)
- Pablo Burchard, Chilean painter (1980)
- Manuel Bustos Huerta, union leader (1999)

== C ==
- Carl XVI Gustaf, king of Sweden (1996)
- Ramon Carnicer, composer of the Chilean national anthem (1947)
- José María Caro Rodríguez, first Chilean cardinal (1967)
- Javiera Carrera, national heroine and sewer of first Chilean flag (1981)
- José Miguel Carrera, general and leader of the independence movement (1910)
- Carlos Casanueva, rector of the Catholic University (1964)
- Miguel de Cervantes, Spanish novelist, poet, and playwright (1947)
- Arturo Prat Chacón, Chilean lawyer and navy officer (1948)
- Jose Ignacio Cienfuegos Arteaga, archbishop (1965)
- Thomas Cochrane, British naval officer and radical politician (1910)
- Christopher Columbus, Italian explorer and discoverer of America (1853)
- Carlos Arnaldo Condell De La Haza, Chilean naval officer and hero of the War of the Pacific (1987)
- Julio Luis Cruz Martínez, hero of the Battle of La Concepción (1982)

== D ==
- Rubén Darío, Nicaraguan poet, newspaper correspondent and diplomat (1967)
- Carlos Dittborn, Chilean football administrator (1995)
- Ignacio Domeyko, Polish geologist, mineralogist and educator (1954)
- Henri Dunant, founder of the Red Cross (1959)

== E ==
- Federico Errázuriz Echaurren, president of Chile (1911)
- Juan Egana, Chilean-Peruvian politician, lawyer and writer (1960)
- Mariano Egaña, Chilean lawyer, conservative politician and writer of the constitution (1934)
- Alonso de Ercilla y Zúñiga, Spanish nobleman, soldier and epic poet (1972)
- Agustín Eyzaguirre, Chilean political figure and Provisional President of Chile (1962)

== F ==
- Emiliano Figueroa, president of Chile (1990)
- St. Francis of Assisi, Italian Catholic friar and preacher (1977)
- Eduardo Frei, president of Chile (1990)
- Ramón Freire, president of Chile (1911)

== G ==
- Mohandas Karamchand Gandhi, leader of India's independence movement (1970)
- Francisco Garcia Huidobro, founded the first mint in Chile (1968)
- Dagoberto Godoy, Chilean pilot and the first person to fly over the Andes (1971)
- Gabriel González Videla, president of Chile (1990)
- Francisco Vidal Gormaz, Chilean naval officer and hydrographer (1975)

== H ==
- Paul Harris, founder of Rotary International (1970)
- Camilo Henríquez, priest, author, politician, and writer (1941)
- Felipe Herrera, Chilean economist, lawyer, academic and political socialist (1999)
- Vicente Huidobro, Chilean poet (1986)
- Alberto Hurtado, Chilean Jesuit priest, lawyer, social worker and writer (1994)

== I ==
- Carlos Ibáñez del Campo, president of Chile (1990)
- St. Ignatius of Loyola, Spanish knight, priest, theologian and saint (1993)
- José Miguel Infante, Chilean statesman and political figure (1962)
- Isabella I, queen of Spain (1952)

== J ==
- Tucapel Jiménez Alfaro, union leader (1999)
- Pope John Paul II, pope (1987)

== K ==
- Father Joseph Kentenich, Pallottine priest and founder of the Schoenstatt Movement (1985)

== L ==
- Amanda Labarca, Chilean diplomat, educator, writer and feminist (1998)
- Pedro Lagos, Chilean infantry commander (1980)
- Honorino Landa, Chilean footballer (1995)
- Alberto Larraguibel, Chilean Army officer and equestrian (1999)
- José Victorino Lastarria, writer, senator, and literary Chilean (2013)
- Juan José Latorre Benavente, vice admiral and military hero (1927)
- Pope Leo XIII, pope (1991)
- San Juan Leonardi, pharmacist, ordained priest and saint (1996)
- Hugo Lepe, Chilean football player (1995)
- Valentin Letelier, lawyer, politician and intellectual (1942)
- Eusebio Lillo, poet, journalist and politician (1947)

== M ==
- Benjamín Vicuña Mackenna, Chilean writer, journalist, historian and politician (1941)
- Juan Mackenna, Chilean military officer and hero of the Chilean War of Independence (1960)
- Ferdinand Magellan, Portuguese explorer (1971)
- José Mardones, founder and governor of Punta Arenas (1944)
- José Gaspar Marín, politician and member of the first national government (1964)
- José de San Martín, Argentine general and leader of the independence movement (1910)
- José Toribio Medina, Chilean bibliographer, writer, and historian (1953)
- García Hurtado de Mendoza, Spanish soldier, governor of Chile, and viceroy of Peru (1958)
- Arturo Merino Benítez, aviator and founder of the Chilean Air Force and LAN Chile (1988)
- Gabriela Mistral, Chilean poet-diplomat, educator and feminist (1958)
- Enrique Molina Garmendia, founder of the University of Concepción (1964)
- Juan Ignacio Molina, educator and scientist (1968)
- Juan Esteban Montero, president of Chile (1990)
- Jorge Montt, president of Chile (1966)
- Julio Montt Salamanca, hero of the Battle of La Concepción (1982)
- Manuel Montt, Chilean statesman and scholar (1911)
- Pedro Montt, president of Chile (1982)
- Carlo Morelli, Chilean opera singer (1997)
- Wolfgang Amadeus Mozart, Austrian composer (1992)
- Francisco Morazán, Honduran politician and head of state of Honduras (1983)

== N ==
- Pedro Navia, Chilean opera singer (1997)
- Pablo Neruda, Chilean poet-diplomat and politician (1991)

== O ==
- Ambrosio O'Higgins, military governor of Chile and viceroy of Peru (1958)
- Bernardo O'Higgins, Chilean independence leader (1910 )
- Pedro de Oña, first known poet born in Chile (1986)

== P ==
- Luis Pardo, rescuer of Ernest Shackleton's ship and crew (1967)
- Pope Paul VI, pope (1979)
- Arturo Perez Canto, hero of the Battle of La Concepción (1982)
- José Joaquín Pérez, president of Chile (1911)
- Philip V, king of Spain (1968)
- Bernhard Eunom Philippi, German naturalist and explorer (1978)
- Rodolfo Amando Philippi, German–Chilean paleontologist, zoologist and explorer (1978)
- Aníbal Pinto, president of Chile (1911)
- Francisco Antonio Pinto, president of Chile (1911)
- Ignacio Carrera Pinto, Chilean hero of the War of the Pacific (1982)
- Diego Portales, Chilean statesman, finance minister and entrepreneur (1955)
- Joaquín Prieto, president of Chile (1911)

== Q ==
- Rayén Quitral, Chilean opera singer (1997)

== R ==
- Luis Emilio Recabarren, union leader (1999)
- Manuel Rengifo, Chilean politician and finance minister (1918)
- Germán Riesco, president of Chile (1966)
- Alejandro del Rio, surgeon and politician (1955)
- Juan Antonio Ríos, president of Chile (1990)
- Manuel Rodriguez, Chilean lawyer and guerrilla leader (1960)
- Eladio Rojas, Chilean footballer (1995)
- St. Rose of Lima, Spanish colonist and saint (1986)
- Juan Martínez de Rozas, leader in the Chilean struggle for independence (1960)

== S ==
- Darío Salas Díaz, educator and writer (1981)
- Manuel de Salas, educator and patriot for Chilean independence (1960)
- Antonio Cardinal Samorè, Italian cardinal of the Catholic Church (1983)
- Juan Jose San Martin, Chilean military commander (1980)
- José Francisco de San Martín, Argentine general and independence leader (1910)
- Juan Luis Sanfuentes, president of Chile (1984)
- Domingo Santa María, president of Chile (1911)
- Federico Santa María, Chilean businessman and philanthropist (1957)
- Pedro Sarmiento de Gamboa, Spanish explorer, author, historian, astronomer, and scientist (1984)
- Lorenzo Sazie, first Dean of the Faculty of Medicine of the University of Chile (1966)
- Albert Schweitzer, German theologian, physician, and medical missionary (1975)
- Ernest Shackleton, polar explorer (1991)
- Raúl Silva Henríquez, Chilean cardinal of the Catholic Church (1999)
- Queen Silvia of Sweden, queen of Sweden (1996)
- Roberto Simpson, hero of the War of the Confederation (1989)
- Rafael Sotomayor, Chilean lawyer, politician and minister of war (1979)
- Heinrich von Stephan, German postal director and founder of the Universal Postal Union (1950)

== T ==
- St. Teresa de Los Andes, saint (1989)
- Joaquín Tocornal, Chilean politician and leader of the independence movement (1934)
- Mateo de Toro y Zambrano, independence leader and President of Government Junta of Chile (1810)
- Policarpo Toro, naval officer who acquired Easter Island for Chile (1970)

== V ==
- Francisco Valdés Subercaseaux, missionary and bishop (2008)
- Pedro de Valdivia, Spanish conquistador and the first royal governor of Chile (1904)
- José Cecilio del Valle, Honduran philosopher, politician, lawyer, and journalist (1983)
- Antonio Vara de la Barra, Chilean lawyer, politician and founder of the State Bank of Chile (1984)
- Laura Vicuña, Chilean holy figure (1989)
- Ramón Vinay, Chilean opera singer (1997)
- St. Vincent de Paul, priest and saint (1981)

== W ==
- George Washington, president of the United States (1976)
- William Wheelwright, developer of steamboat and train transportation in Chile (1966)
- John Williams Wilson, British-Chilean sailor and politician (1944)
- Orville Wright, aviation pioneer (2003)
- Wilbur Wright, aviation pioneer (2003)

== Z ==
- Federico Zañartu, president of Chile (1911)
- Renato Zanelli, Chilean opera singer (1997)
- José Ignacio Zenteno, Chilean soldier, politician and hero of the Chilean War of Independence (1910)

== Sources ==
- Scott Standard Postage Stamp Catalogue, Volume 2, 2015
- Linn's Stamp News, Amos Media Company
- Stanley Gibbons Stamp Catalogue, Part 15, 3rd Edition, 2007
- Michel Übersee-Katalog Band 3: Südamerika 2001
