= Juan Antonio Ovalle =

Chilean politician, lawyer and landowner

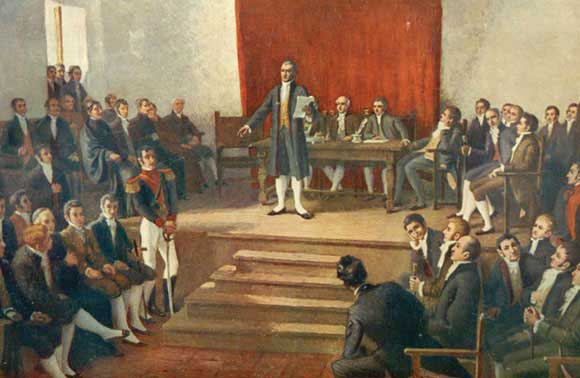
- Mural depicting Juan Antonio Ovalle and the First National Congress of Chile during its inaugural session.

President of First National Congress of Chile
- In office 4 July 1811 – 29 July 1811
- Succeeded by: Martín Calvo Encalada

Member of the Chamber of Deputies of Chile
- In office 4 July 1811 – 2 December 1811
- Succeeded by: Dissolution of position

Procurator of Santiago
- In office c. 1809 – May 1810

Personal details
- Born: c. 1750; Captaincy General of Chile
- Died: 12 July 1819; Santiago, Chile
- Profession: Lawyer

Juan Antonio Ovalle y Morales (c. 1750 – July 12, 1819) was a Chilean politician, lawyer and landowner. He served as the first president of the First National Congress of Chile where he was elected as deputy for Santiago.

Ovalle served as Procurator of Santiago from c. 1809 to May 1810 when he was arrested by the royalist government and sent to Callao, returning to the Captaincy General of Chile shortly afterwards.

His tenure as congressman came to an end following the 1811 coup d'état when José Miguel Carrera issued a decree decreasing the number of deputies for Santiago. He was subsequently confined to his estancia in Curacaví.

Ovalle was afterwards sent to the Juan Fernández Islands in November 1814, being finally returned to the mainland in September 1815.
