= Camilo Henríquez =

Chilean priest, author, and politician

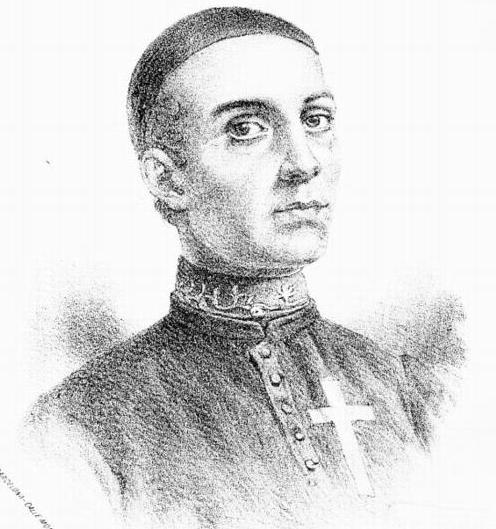
Friar Camilo Henríquez

Friar José Camilo Henríquez González (Spanish pronunciation: [kaˈmilo enˈrikeθ]; July 29, 1769 in Valdivia, Chile – March 16, 1825 in Santiago de Chile) was a priest, author, politician, and is considered an intellectual antecedent to and founding father of the Republic of Chile for his passionate leadership and influential writings. He was also one of the most important early South American newspaper writers and wrote several essays, most notably the Proclama de Quirino Lemachez, which promoted Chilean independence and liberty. He also wrote under the pseudonym Quirino Lemachez.

== Early life ==
Henríquez was born in a house that belonged to his grandmother Margarita de Castro, located on what is now Yungay street in the city of Valdivia, Chile. His parents were Rosa González y Castro (1747–1798) and Félix Henríquez y Santillán (1745–1798), a former Spanish infantry captain. Although a native of Valdivia, Henríquez spent much of his youth away from the city. When he was nine years old, he was brought to Santiago de Chile for the start of his formal education at the Convictorio Carolino.

== Religious life ==
In 1784, at the age of fifteen, Henríquez was sent to study in Lima under the direction of his maternal uncle, Juan Nepomuceno González, a member of the Order of Ministros de los Enfermos Agonizantes de San Camilo de Lelis. While in Lima, he was educated at a convent of his uncle's Order (usually referred to as simply the "Buena Muerte"), where, notably, he was taught by Friar Isidoro de Celis, an author of works on logic, mathematics, and physics, and a strong proponent of science, rationality, and humanism. After presenting proof of his limpieza de sangre (pure Christian blood), Henríquez joined the Order of Buena Muerte as a novice on January 17, 1787, and was officially ordained as a priest on January 28, 1790. Henríquez then cloistered himself to continue his studies. There he befriended José Cavero y Salazar, a fellow student, who would later become a prominent member of the first independent government of Peru and ambassador to Chile; throughout his stay in Lima, Henríquez frequented literary circles, associating with local socialites.

=== Spanish Inquisition ===
In 1809, Henríquez was arrested and interrogated by the Spanish Inquisition. Miguel Luis Amunátegui notes that Henríquez was always secretive about the reasons for his incarceration, and that claims about it made by historians are speculative in nature. However, the most commonly cited explanation for this is that he was reading, or in possession of, banned books. Henríquez had been heavily influenced by French Enlightenment philosophy in his early life, and he began to read literature that had previously been banned by the Spanish government. While in Lima, Henríquez, including Jean-Jacques Rousseau's Social Contract and Louis-Sébastien Mercier's L'An 2440, rêve s'il en fut . After his release, his superiors in the Order of Buena Muerte sent Henríquez to Quito to found a new convent for the order.

== Author and newspaperman ==
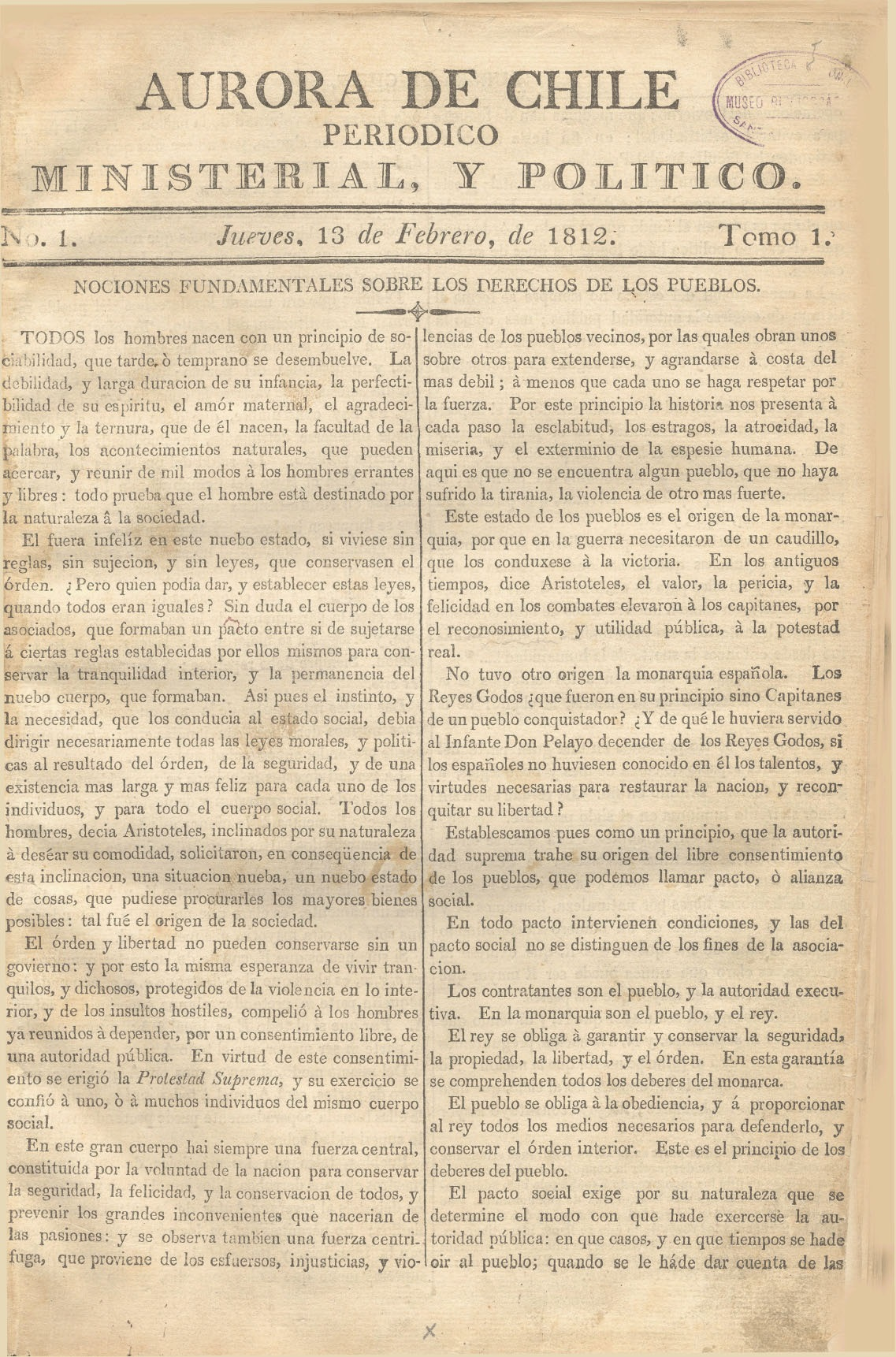
First issue of La Aurora de Chile

After his order sent him to Quito, Henríquez became a witness to the violence of the royalists in 1809. Henríquez wrote about these experiences in what would become the more famous of his two plays, Camila o la Patriota de Sud América (Camila, or the Patriot of South America). In 1811, he returned to Chile and became involved in politics. He wrote the Proclama de Quirino Lemachez, (Proclamation of Quirino Lemachez) under a pseudonym created with an anagram of his name. In this influential essay, he argued for the support of pro-independence candidates in the next election for the First National Congress (Primer Congreso Nacional). His literature instantly catapulted him into the national consciousness, even though his true identity had not yet been made public.

Despite his forays into the political arena, Henríquez was perhaps most famous for his lifelong promotion of and contributions to newspapers. He wrote for numerous periodicals and edited at least 10 newspapers in Santiago and Buenos Aires during his lifetime. On January 16, 1812, Henríquez became the first editor of the La Aurora de Chile (The Dawn of Chile). La Aurora was the first newspaper in Chile, and used a printing press bought from the United States. The first issue was published on February 13, 1812.

During this period, in which Henríquez was serving as a senator, he produced the drama "La Procesión de los Tontos" (The Procession of the Fools"). Due to the censorship of the administration of José Miguel Carrera, the Monitor Araucano (Araucanian Monitor) began publication under the direction of Camilo Henríquez as a substitute for La Aurora, and their first issue was published on April 17, 1813. He also published the Catecismo de los patriotas (“Catechism of the Patriots”) in the Monitor.

=== Proclama de Quirino Lemachez ===
"Nature made us equal and only by virtue of a free pact made spontaneously and voluntarily, can another man exercise just, legitimate, and reasonable authority over us."
Proclama de Quirino Lemachez, 1812.

The Proclama de Quirino Lemachez was one of the most important early revolutionary essays promoting Chilean independence. The proclamation became representative of the rising popularity of independence among the educated Creole elite in Chile. Henríquez' philosophy bears a considerable debt to the social contract theorists of the Enlightenment. Henríquez, as Quirino Lemachez, declared that since none of the patriots or their forebears had consented to a political pact with Spain, they should establish an independent government. The essay contained hints of early Chilean nationalism, claiming that "some day one would speak of the republic, the power of Chile, the majesty of the Chilean people," and caught the attention of many European readers, where it was reprinted.

=== La Aurora de Chile ===
La Aurora de Chile, Chile's first newspaper and first printing operation of any kind, issued its first February 13, 1812, with Camilo Henríquez as editor. He used the newspaper to advocate for revolutionary values and to champion the new spirit of education and reason that he believed came with it. He opened the first issue with

"We now have in our possession the great and prescient instrument of universal enlightenment, the printing press...After the sad and insufferable silence of three centuries—centuries of infamy and lamentation !—the voice of reason and truth will be heard amongst us..."

Henríquez described himself as an educator and philosopher, and his publications frequently reflected revolutionary political ideals and Enlightenment notions, especially Rousseauian, of freedom and liberty.

== Political activism ==
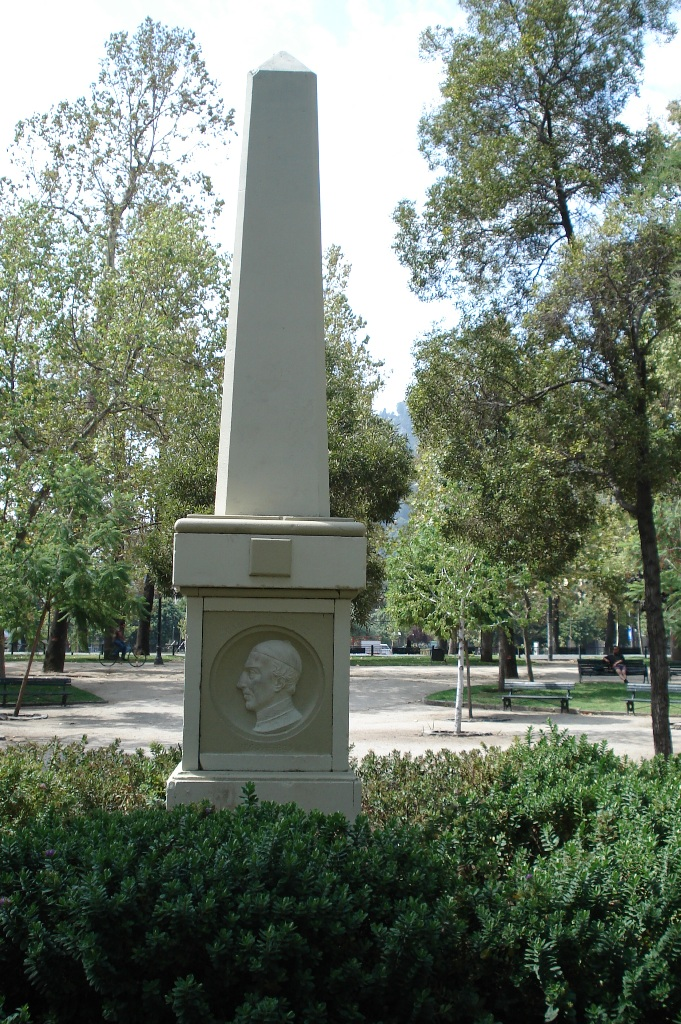
Obelisk dedicated to Friar Camilo Henríquez, Manuel de Salas, Manuel José Gandarillas y José Miguel Infante in the Parque Forestal in the city of Santiago de Chile

Henríquez was one of the most outspoken agitators for Chilean independence, and both with his polemical publications and his career in politics, he became one of the most prominent early national leaders.

=== War of Independence ===
After the takeover of power by the local revolutionary junta from the Spanish governors, Henríquez was part of the patriot force that put down the counterrevolutionary Motín de Figueroa (Figueroa mutiny) on April 1, 1811. Ironically, Tomás de Figueroa's (the leader of the revolt) only allowance before his execution the next day was receiving the Sacrament of Confession from the local priest, Henríquez himself.

In the First National Congress, Henríquez was an interim deputy for Puchacay. He also gave a sermon on the mass at the inauguration of the sessions at Congress, in which he argued that the church authorize Congress to create a national constitution. He became the president of the senate in 1813 as part of a two-year stint in the senate (1813–14). He authored several laws, including those that highlighted the Reglamento Constitucional Provisorio de 1812 and protection of the indigenous people.

Henríquez' brother, José Manuel, was killed during the Disaster of Rancagua, defending one of the trenches of the plaza Rancagua After the Disaster of Rancagua (Desastre de Rancagua), Henríquez fled to Mendoza, and would later escape to Buenos Aires. There, Henríquez contributed to the La Gaceta de Buenos Aires (The Buenos Aires Gazette) and El Censor (The Censor), and he reportedly studied mathematics and medicine while in exile.

After the Reconquista, Henríquez returned to Chile at Bernardo O'Higgins' request and returned to working for newspapers in Santiago.

== Later life ==
Henríquez was named librarian of the National Library of Chile and was in charge of the editing of the La Gazeta Ministerial de Chile (Ministerial Gazette of Chile) and another other bulletin about the administration of the country which was the precursor to the El Mercurio (The Mercury) of Chile.

In 1823, he was an interim deputy for Chiloé and afterwards served as an interim and then fully titular deputy for Copiapó in 1824. During this time, Henríquez was a part of the nine-member senado conservador (conservative senate) created to advise the new Supreme Director of Chile, Ramón Freire.

Henríquez died in Santiago in 1825. After his death, the government declared a national period of mourning.

Political offices
Preceded by Pedro Vivar	President of the Senate of Chile; 1812	Succeeded by José María De Rozas Lima
