= Juan de Dios Vial del Río =

Chilean politician

President of the Senate of the Republic of Chile
- In office 11 March 1824 – 11 March 1825
- Succeeded by: Agustín Eyzaguirre

Personal details
- Born: 1 January 1774 Concepción, Captaincy General of Chile, Spanish Empire
- Died: 27 November 1850 (aged 76) Santiago, Chile
- Party: None
- Education: Royal University of San Felipe (MA)
- Occupation: Politician
- Profession: Lawyer

Juan de Dios Vial del Río (1774–1850) was a Chilean politician who served as President of the Senate of Chile and President of the Chamber of Deputies.
