= National Congress of Chile =

National legislature of Chile

Coordinates: 33°02′52″S 71°36′21″W

National Congress of Chile Congreso Nacional de Chile
- LVII legislative period
- Coat of arms of Chile

Type
- Type: Bicameral
- Houses: Senate; Chamber of Deputies

History
- Founded: July 4, 1811 (First National Congress)

Leadership
- President of the Senate: Paulina Núñez Urrutia
- President of the Chamber of Deputies: Jorge Alessandri Vergara

Structure
- Seats: Total: 205; 50 senators 155 deputies
- Senate political groups: Government (25): ChGU (18); RN (8); UDI (5); Evópoli (2); Democrats (2); Independents (1); CpCh (7); PLR (5); Independents (2); Supported by (1): PNL (1); Opposition (24): UpCh (20); PS (7); PPD (4); DC (3); PCCh (3); FA (2); Liberal (1); FREVS (2); Independents (2)
- Chamber of Deputies political groups: Government (68): Republican (31); UDI (18); RN (16) (Note: RN (13); Evópoli (2); Democrats (1)); Independents (3); Supported by (8): PNL (8); Independents (14): PDG (14); Opposition (65): Broad Front (18); Communist (12); Socialist (15) (Note: Socialist (11); Liberal (3); Radical (1)); PPD (10); PDC (10) (Note: PDC (8); FREVS (2))
- Length of term: Senators: eight-year term with the option to go for re-election one time; Deputies: four-year term, may go for re-election two times

Meeting place
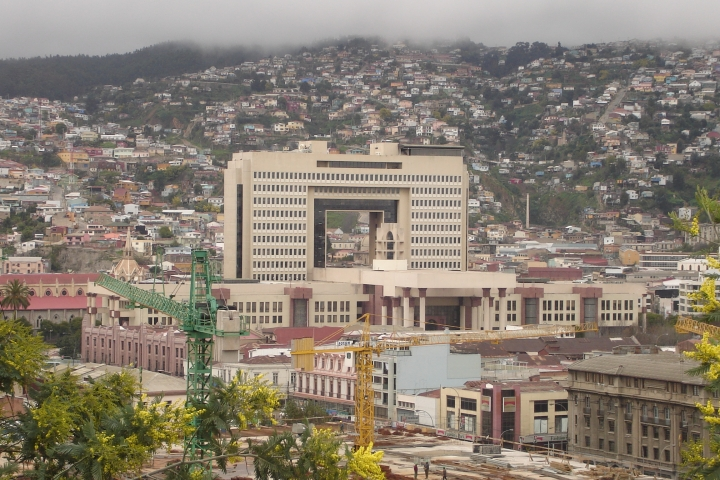
- Edificio del Congreso Nacional; Valparaíso; Chile

Website
- Cámara de Diputados (in Spanish); Senado (in Spanish)

The National Congress of Chile (Spanish: Congreso Nacional de Chile) is the legislative branch of the Republic of Chile. According to the current Constitution (Chilean Constitution of 1980), it is a bicameral organ made up of a Chamber of Deputies and a Senate. Established by law No. 18678, the city of Valparaíso is its official headquarters.

Chile's congress is the oldest operational in Latin America and one of the oldest in Ibero-America. The First Chilean National Congress was founded on July 4, 1811, to decide the best kind of government for the Kingdom of Chile during the captivity of King Ferdinand VII in the hands of Napoleon.

The Chamber of Deputies is composed of 155 deputies (Spanish: diputados) elected to four-year terms. Re-election is possible for a maximum of two times, which means that the deputy may remain in the post for up to 12 years. The country has 28 electoral districts (Spanish: distritos electoral) which each elect between 3 and 8 deputies.

The Senate is composed of 50 senators (Spanish: senadores) elected to eight-year terms. Re-election is possible at most one time, which means a senator can remain in the post for up to 16 years. The electoral divisions of the Senate are different from those of the Chamber of Deputies. Each of the 16 regions of Chile forms a senatorial constituency (Spanish: circunscripción senatorial) that elects between 2 and 5 senators.

The Congress's powers, duties and processes are defined in articles 42 to 59 of the current constitution of 1980 and through the Constitutional Organic Law No. 18918 published in 1990.

The current electoral system (or voting system) in Chile is proportional and inclusive according to the 2015 update of the organic law No. 18700, article 179 bis.

The National Congress was closed without an immediate renewal of the members of its two chambers during three periods: 1924-1925, June-October 1932 and 1973-1989.

A new four-years legislative period begins with the installation of the National Congress. The LVII legislative period of the Chilean Congress began on March 11, 2026 and will end in 2030.

== History ==
=== Dictatorship 1973-1990 ===
On 13 September 1973, the Government Junta of Chile dissolved Congress.

During the last years of the Pinochet regime, the current building of Congress was built in the port city of Valparaíso, some 140 km west of the country's capital, Santiago. This new building replaced the Former National Congress Building, located in downtown Santiago.

=== Transition to Democracy ===
Between 1989 and 2013, elections in Chile were carried out following a binomial voting system, which was prescribed in 1980 during the Military dictatorship of Chile.

The binomial system was considered by most analysts as the main constitutional lock that prevented completion of the Chilean transition to democracy.

== Procedure ==
=== Sessions ===
Congress operates through plenary sessions and committees, in accordance with the Constitution and the rules of each chamber.

Plenary sessions may be:

- Ordinary: held during the regular period of operation of Congress.
- Special: convened to deal with one or more specific matters.
- Extraordinary: held outside the ordinary period, at the request of the President of the Republic.
- Secret: sessions in which, by agreement of the chamber, proceedings are held without public access.
- Requested: sessions requested by a specified number of parliamentarians, in accordance with internal rules.

==== National Congress and Plenary Congress ====
A joint meeting of the two chambers is called Plenary Congress when it is presided over by the President of the Senate and is held in order to:

- Hear the presidential mandatory annual report on the administrative and political state of the nation (Presidential Public Address), delivered by the President of the Republic.
- Take note of the decision by which the Elections Qualifying Court proclaims the president-elect.
- Receive the oath or solemn promise of the president-elect before he or she assumes office.
- In exceptional cases, proceed to the election of the President of the Republic in cases of vacancy in the office.

Before the 2005 constitutional reform, the Plenary Congress also met to approve or reject, without debate, constitutional reforms previously discussed and approved by both chambers.

Likewise, before the entry into force of the 1980 Constitution, the Plenary Congress met to take note of the general count of the presidential election and proclaim the president-elect. If no candidate obtained an absolute majority, it fell to the Plenary Congress to elect, from among the two candidates who had received the highest relative majorities, the President of the Republic, and to proclaim that person accordingly.

== Location ==
From the First National Congress in 1811 until 1828, Chilean congresses—and other equivalent bodies or assemblies—met permanently in Santiago. This changed with the Constituent Congress of 1828, which sat in Valparaíso during the final stage of its sessions.

Later, with the National Congress of Chile of 1828, sessions returned to Santiago from 1 September of that year, a practice that continued uninterrupted until 1973.

The Congresses of 1824–1825 and the Constituent Congress of 1826 were initially called to meet in the cities of Quillota and Rancagua, respectively; however, at the request of the majority of the elected deputies, it was decreed that both would ultimately meet in Santiago.

When the Constituent Congress of 1828 was convened, it was provided that it would meet in Rancagua on 12 February 1828, in order to highlight the historical importance of that city during the Patria Vieja and to coincide with the commemoration of the Battle of Chacabuco. However, the majority of the elected deputies opposed the installation of Congress in a city other than the capital, and this was communicated to the government. Consequently, by decree of 8 February 1828, the government of Francisco Antonio Pinto ordered that Congress would be installed in Santiago.

Nevertheless, the idea of moving the seat of Congress to a city other than Santiago remained. Thus, deputy Manuel Araos (alternate member for Cauquenes) presented, on 16 April 1828, a motion to establish the city of Valparaíso as the seat of the sessions, which was reported to the chamber two days later. The initiative was approved on 24 April 1828 and became law the following day, ordering the transfer of Congress to Valparaíso.

Ultimately, the Constituent Congress sat in Valparaíso between 28 May and 6 August 1828, until the completion of the drafting of the Constitution of Chile of 1828.

=== In Santiago ===
The installation ceremony of the First National Congress, on 4 July 1811, took place in the building of the Royal Consulate Court of Santiago, located at the corner of what are now Bandera and Compañía streets, where the east wing of the Palace of the Courts of Justice now stands. The Palace of the Royal Audiencia of Santiago, located opposite the Plaza de Armas of Santiago, was designated for its sessions.

The I Legislative Period of the National Congress of Chile of 1828 met again in Santiago from 1 September of that year, with the bicameral system already consolidated. In the absence of its own building, the chambers met separately: the Senate met in the building of the Consulate Court, and the Chamber of Deputies met in the facilities of the University of San Felipe—during hours when classes were not being held—on the site now occupied by the Municipal Theatre of Santiago. The chamber used by the deputies measured 60 feet long by 30 feet wide.

In 1857 the construction project began for what would become Chile's first legislative palace. The National Congress, including both the Senate and the Chamber of Deputies, operated in what is now the Former National Congress Building from 1876 until the coup d'état of 1973.

After Congress was transferred to Valparaíso, the building housed the Ministry of Foreign Affairs between 1990 and 2006. At the beginning of 2006, the Foreign Ministry moved to its new headquarters, returning the facilities to the National Congress, which allowed parliamentary committees to meet again in Santiago. During 2021, its main halls and some meeting rooms were used by the Constitutional Convention.

=== In Valparaíso ===
On 11 March 1990, parliamentary activity resumed after more than 16 years of recess as a result of the military dictatorship of Chile (1973–1990). For reasons of decentralization, the seat of Congress was transferred to the city of Valparaíso.

The building was designed by the Chilean architects Juan Cárdenas, José Covacevic, and Raúl Farrú, whose work was selected from among 38 finalists in the preliminary design competition called by the Ministry of Public Works, to which a total of 539 proposals were submitted.

On 18 December 1987, the law establishing that the new seat of the National Congress would be located in Valparaíso was approved. Construction of the building began on 20 October 1988. This 60,000 m² structure, whose framework used 26,000 m³ of reinforced concrete, stands on a 25,000 m² site formerly occupied by Enrique Deformes Hospital of Valparaíso, which was demolished following the severe damage caused by the earthquake of 3 March 1985.

=== Library ===
Congress has a library, an institution comparable to the Library of Congress of the United States, which provides specialized information services to its members, as well as a Centre for Computing and Information Technology, without prejudice to other shared services that both chambers may jointly agree to establish.

== See also ==
- Republic of Chile
- Chamber of Deputies of Chile
- Senate of Chile
- Politics of Chile
