= Joaquín Echeverría =

Chilean politician and government minister (1774–1835)

José Joaquín Echeverría y Larraín (1774–1835) was a Chilean politician and government official who participated in the early independence movement and the formation of the Chilean republic.

He served as a deputy and president of the First National Congress of Chile in 1811, Intendant of Santiago in 1813, and held various ministerial positions during the Supreme Directorship of Bernardo O'Higgins. He also exercised delegated executive authority during O'Higgins's absences in 1820 and 1822.
