= Manuel de Salas =

Chilean lawyer, educator and politician (1754–1841)

Manuel de Salas y Corbalán (19 June 1754 – 28 November 1841) was a Chilean lawyer, educator and politician who participated in the Chilean independence movement and the establishment of the early republic. He was a promotor of the "Law of Wombs", which severely limited slavery in Chile and was a key step in its abolition.
