= Martín Calvo Encalada =

Chilean politician

President of Provisional Executive Authority of Chile
- In office 11 August 1811 – 4 September 1811
- Preceded by: Juan Antonio Ovalle
- Succeeded by: Juan Enrique Rosales

President of First National Congress of Chile
- In office 20 July 1811 – 11 August 1811

Personal details
- Born: Martín Calvo de Encalada y Recabarren; 7 January 1756 Santiago, Captaincy General of Chile
- Died: 2 July 1828 (aged 72) Santiago, Chile
- Party: Independent (Not affiliated with liberals or conservatives)
- Parent(s): Manuel Calvo de Encalada Chacón; Margarita de Racabarren Pardo de Figueroa

Martín Calvo de Encalada y Recabarren (January 7, 1756 – July 2, 1828) was a Chilean politician who participated as a member of Congress during the Chilean War of Independence.

== Biography ==
Martín Calvo Encalada was born in Santiago, the son of Manuel Calvo de Encalada Chacón, second Marquis of Villa Palma, and of Margarita de Racabarren Pardo de Figueroa. He joined the Spanish Army, and was a "maestre de campo" and a Lieutenant of the Cavalry Regiment of the Princess. He was integral of the First Junta of the Government of the Kingdom 1810 to 1811, and one of the strongest proponents of the independence of the country.

He was part of the First National Congress of 1811 (July 4–20, 1811) as a deputy for Talca and Curicó, and was elected its vice president. On August 11, 1811 he was elected president of the Provisional Executive Authority. After the Disaster of Rancagua he didn't try to emigrate to Argentina, staying in Chile and being incarcerated on the Juan Fernández Islands and was relegated during the Reconquista. Liberated from his captivity, he continued collaborating with the emancipation cause in Chile, integrating himself in 1818 to the Senado Conservador as a Senator, occupying the position until 1822. He became part of the Council of State in 1823 in capacity of a Councilor. He died in Santiago, at the age of 72.

== See also ==
- Manuel Blanco Encalada
- Ventura Blanco Encalada

== Sources ==
- Virgilio Figueroa (1928). Diccionario histórico, biográfico y bibliográfico de Chile, Tomo II. Santiago : Impr. y Litogr. La Ilustración.
