= Gaspar Marín =

Chilean politician

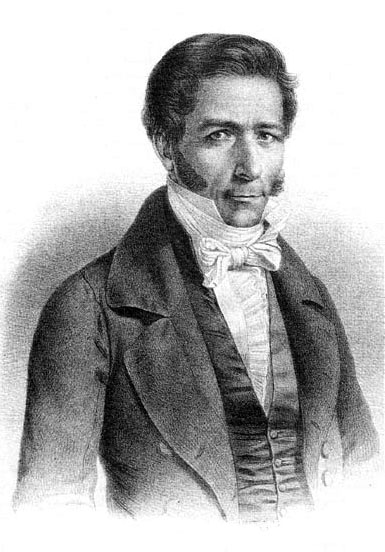

Gaspar Marín (1772 – 24 February 1839) was a Chilean politician. He served in the Chamber of Deputies and the Senate of Chile.
