= Ministry of Justice (Chile) =

Government ministry of Chile

Ministry of Justice and Human Rights
- Ministerio de Justicia y Derechos Humanos
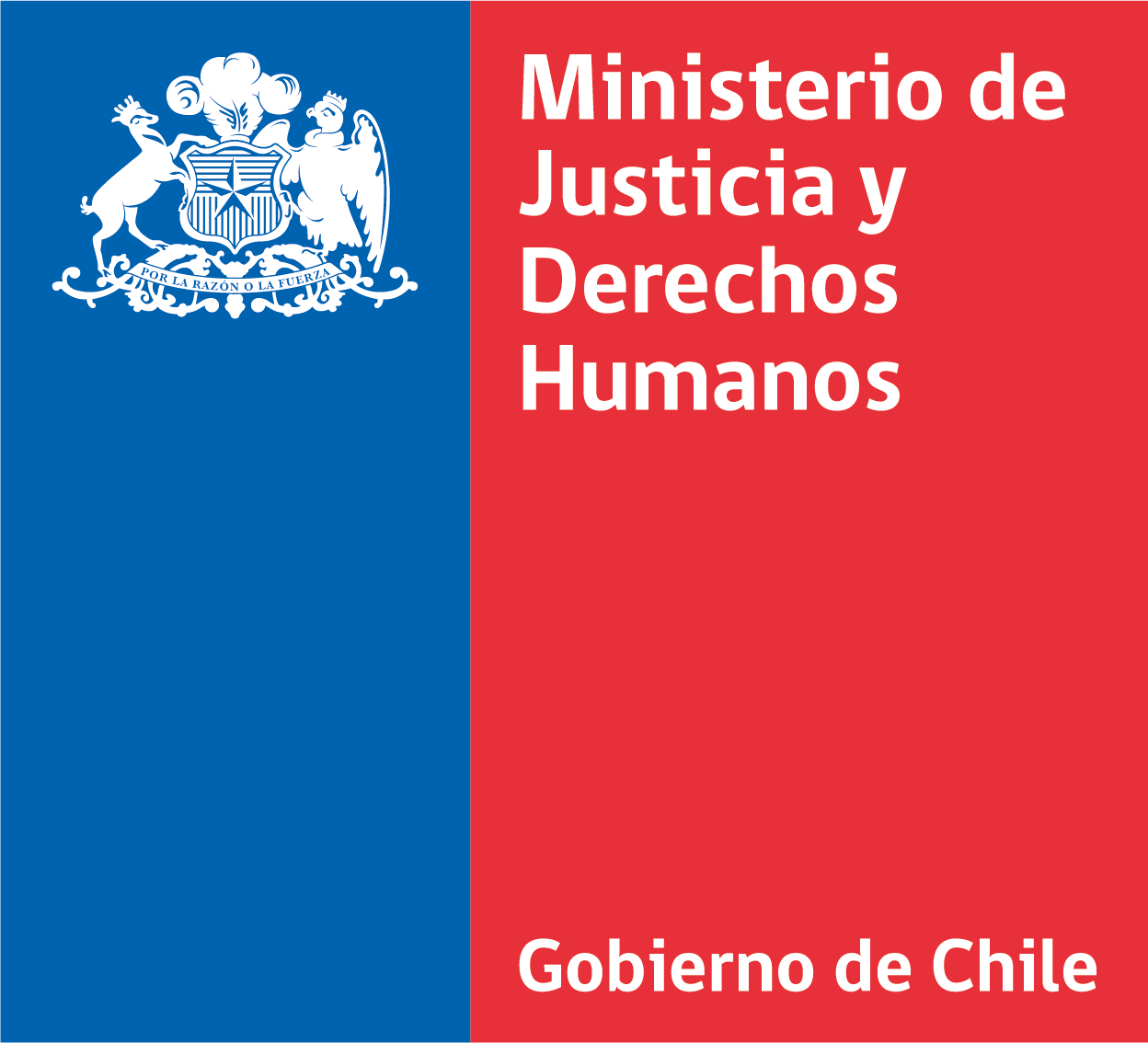

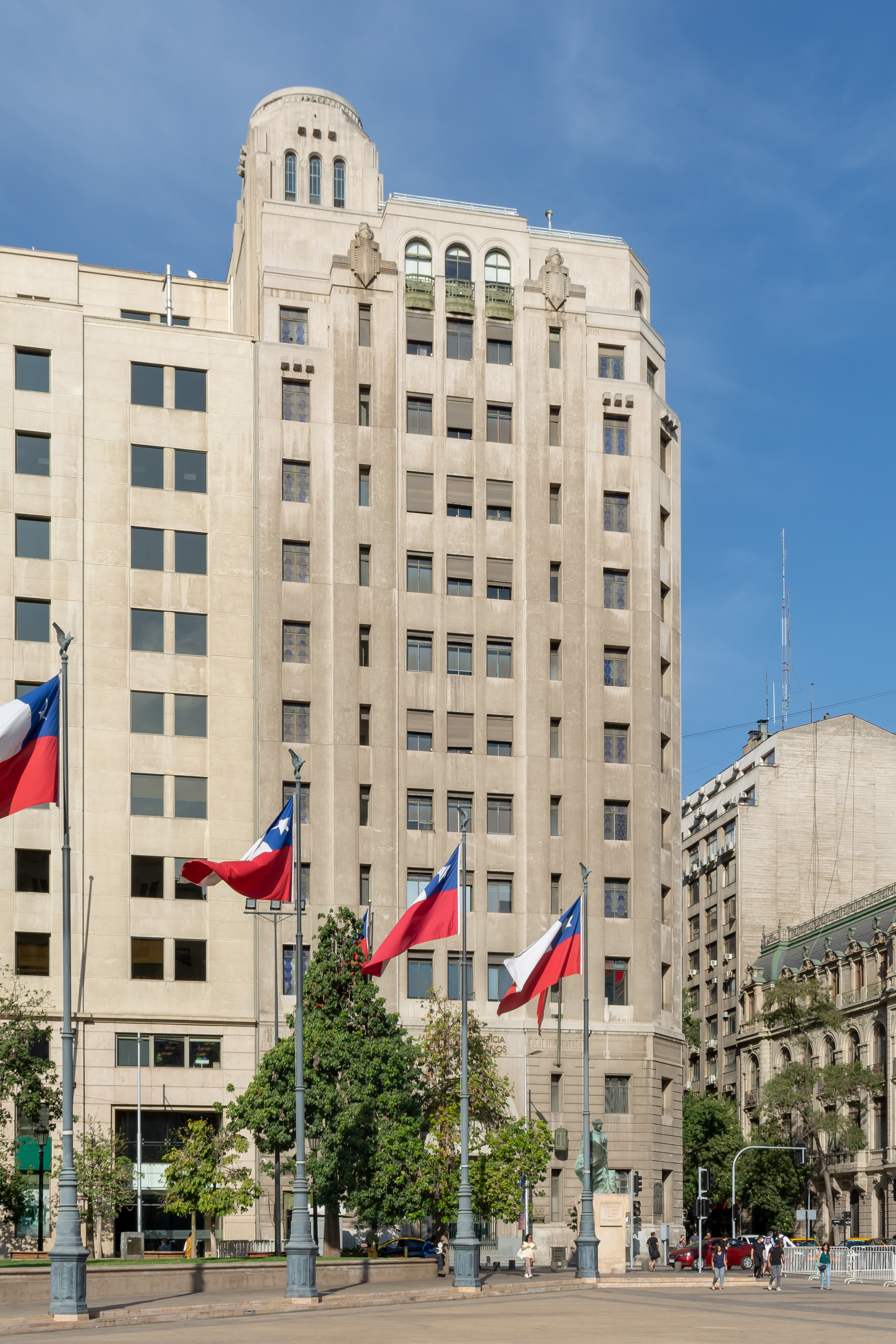
- Headquarters of Ministry of Justice and Human Rights at Seguro Obrero building in Santiago

Agency overview
- Formed: 1 February 1837 (as Ministry of Justice, Worship, and Public Instruction) and 5 January 2016 (as Ministry of Justice and Human Rights)
- Jurisdiction: Government of Chile
- Headquarters: Calle Morandé 107, Santiago
- Employees: 29,814 (2020)
- Annual budget: 1,183,064,384 of CLP (2020)
- Agency executives: Fernando Rabat, Minister of Justice and Human Rights; Luis Silva Irarrázaval, Undersecretary of Justice; Pablo Mira, Undersecretary of Human Rights
- Website: minjusticia.gob.cl

The Ministry of Justice and Human Rights of Chile (Spanish: Ministerio de Justicia y Derechos Humanos; MinJusticia) is the state ministry responsible for liaising between the executive branch and the judicial branch, and promoting and fostering human rights. Currently, the lawyer and scholar Fernando Rabat serves as Minister of Justice and Human Rights, Luis Silva Irarrázaval holds the position of head of the Undersecretary of Justice and Pablo Mira is head of the Undersecretary of Human Rights, all appointed under president José Antonio Kast.

The Undersecretary for Human Rights is the chief executive of the Undersecretariat of Human Rights and the immediate collaborator of the Minister in matters within its sphere of competence, and, in the event of the absence or incapacity of the Undersecretary of Justice, serves as the latter's legal substitute.

== History ==
The Ministry of Justice has been known by four different names:

- Ministerio de Justicia, Culto e Instrucción Pública (1837–1887)
- Ministerio de Justicia e Instrucción Pública (1887–1927)
- Ministerio de Justicia (1927–2016)
- Ministerio de Justicia y Derechos Humanos (2016–2026)

The ministry was first created on February 1, 1837, under the name Ministry of Justice, Worship, and Public Instruction (Ministerio de Justicia, Culto e Instrucción Pública), during the government of José Joaquín Prieto Vial. Its first minister was Diego Portales Palazuelos, who, having served only on an interim basis, handed over the office on June 26 of that same year to Mariano Egaña. At that time, the ministry's role was to oversee everything related to legislation and the organization of the judicial branch.

On November 25, 1870, an ordinance issued by President José Joaquín Pérez established the creation of a Special Guard for the Urban Prison of Santiago, (Guardia Especial para el Presidio Urbano de Santiago) which became the foundation of the Chilean Gendarmerie Corps, with the name becoming official on 1921.

The creation of the Civil Registry during the presidency of Domingo Santa María in 1884 responded to cultural changes in Chilean society at the time, marked by greater diversity, different religious beliefs, and new values. Accordingly, a Civil Marriage Law was promulgated on January 16, 1884, authorizing a judge to perform a civil marriage ceremony in cases where ecclesiastical authorities refused to do so.

In 1887, the Department of Worship was separated from the ministry and placed under the Ministry of Foreign Affairs, and the institution was renamed the Ministry of Justice and Public Instruction. The dedication of physicians who applied their discipline in the service of justice was reflected in 1915 with the creation of the Legal Medical Service (Servicio Médico Legal, SML), a public body that provides legal and forensic advice to the country's courts of justice.

In 1927, the Organic Law of Ministries was enacted, which included the Ministry of Justice and, at the same time, created the Ministry of Public Education.

In 1943, the Civil Registry was merged with the Identification Service and came to be called the Civil Registry and Identification Service (Servicio de Registro Civil e Identificación, SRCI), a name it retains to this day.

Three decades later, in 1973, a computerized system was established to systematize the issuance of the National Unique Number (Rol Único Nacional, R.U.N.) to every person born in national territory.

In January 1979, the National Service for Minors (Servicio Nacional de Menores, Sename) was created. According to the legal statutes of its establishment, this body represents the means by which the State assumes an active role in the protection of vulnerable children and adolescents and provides support to juvenile courts as an "auxiliary body of the administration of justice" (órgano auxiliar de la administración de justicia).

Law No. 17,995, of May 8, 1981, granted legal personhood to the current Judicial Assistance Corporations (Corporación de Asistencia Judicial, CAJ) of the Metropolitan, Biobío, and Valparaíso regions. These bodies replaced the former legal aid offices that had depended on the Chilean Bar Association in matters related to judicial assistance services.

In 1999, the Organic Constitutional Law of the Public Prosecutor's Office (Ley Orgánica Constitucional del Ministerio Público) was published, which was key to the successful implementation of the Criminal Procedure Reform (Reforma Procesa Penal, RPP). This institution is responsible for representing the community in criminal prosecution, directing criminal investigations, and providing assistance to victims and witnesses.

Starting on December 16, 2000, and continuing until June 2005, the country underwent a gradual process of implementing the RPP. The new criminal justice system incorporated "new standards of transparency, publicity, immediacy, speed, and orality", (nuevos estándares de transparencia, publicidad, inmediación, celeridad y oralidad) while separating the functions of investigation and adjudication, thus leaving behind "an inquisitorial and outdated system" (un sistema inquisitivo y vetusto).

In 2016, the ministry changed its name to the Ministry of Justice and Human Rights with the creation of the Undersecretariat of Human Rights, through Law No. 20,885, promulgated on December 16, 2015, and published in the Official Gazette on January 5, 2016.

== Functions ==
The Ministry of Justice and Human Rights has the following twenty-six functions:

1. To carry out a critical study of constitutional provisions and of civil, criminal, commercial, administrative, and procedural legislation, in order to propose to the President of the Republic such reforms as it deems appropriate.
2. To collaborate, within the scope of its competence, with the President of the Republic on matters relating to the promotion and protection of human rights. In exercising this function, it shall critically review domestic legislation in light of International Human Rights Law and propose to the President of the Republic the reforms it considers appropriate in this regard.
3. To provide technical advice to the Ministry of Foreign Affairs in proceedings before international human rights courts and bodies and, in the exercise of this function, to collaborate in the preparation of responses or reports submitted on behalf of the State of Chile.
4. To collaborate with the Ministry of Foreign Affairs in the preparation and follow-up of periodic reports to human rights bodies and mechanisms; in the implementation of precautionary and provisional measures, friendly settlements, and international judgments to which Chile is a party; and, as appropriate, in the implementation of resolutions and recommendations arising from the Inter-American System and the Universal Human Rights System, without prejudice to the powers of other State bodies.
5. To enter into collaboration and cooperation agreements with public and private bodies, whether national or international, within the scope of its competencies.
6. To advise the President of the Republic on the appointment of judges, officials of the administration of justice, and other employees of the Judiciary, and on the exercise of the special power to oversee the official conduct of judges.
7. To formulate sector policies, plans, and programs, especially with regard to the judicial defense of the interests of the State; penitentiary treatment and the rehabilitation of convicted persons; the legal organization of the family and identification of persons; the guardianship exercised by the State in the administration and realization of the assets of persons who become insolvent; and the assistance systems applicable to children and adolescents who lack guardianship or whose guardianship has been altered, as well as to those who present conduct disorders or are in conflict with the justice system.
8. To monitor compliance with sector policies, plans, and programs and to evaluate their results.
9. To issue regulations and give instructions to which its dependent services must adhere, and to supervise their compliance.
10. To address the organizational and operational needs of the Courts of Justice.
11. To advise the Courts of Justice on technical matters through the bodies under its authority.
12. To plan and propose the acquisition, construction, adaptation, and fitting-out by the State of buildings for the Courts of Justice, the Ministry, and its dependent services, without prejudice to the powers of the Administrative Corporation of the Judiciary.
13. To propose to the Executive Branch the measures necessary to resolve difficulties and doubts submitted to it regarding the interpretation and application of the law, in accordance with Articles 5 of the Civil Code and 102 of the Organic Code of Courts.
14. To ensure the provision of free legal assistance in accordance with the law.
15. To propose measures to prevent crime through social reintegration plans.
16. To create penal institutions, penitentiary treatment and rehabilitation establishments.
17. To issue the resolutions necessary for the enforcement of final judgments that order payment by the State Treasury.
18. To advise the President of the Republic on matters relating to amnesty and pardons.
19. To examine the relevant records and, where appropriate, propose the granting of the benefits provided for in Decree Law No. 409 of 1932.
20. To intervene in the oversight of associations and foundations in accordance with Title XXXIII of Book I of the Civil Code, as well as to exercise all the powers and other functions conferred upon it by Law No. 20,500 on associations and citizen participation in public administration.
21. To participate in the legalization of instruments issued or authorized by the Judiciary, by the Ministry, by its dependent services, and by bodies that are related to the Government through the Ministry.
22. To issue the certifications and official documentary attestations requested by international organizations or foreign entities from the Government, in matters that may affect the State Treasury.
23. To approve the official text of the Codes and authorize their official editions.
24. To rule on the projects and execution of works of the Chilean Gendarmerie, and their priorities, which must be submitted for approval to the President of the Republic. With regard to these works, the Ministry of Justice and Human Rights shall have the same powers as those granted by law to the Ministry of Public Works for other works of this nature.
25. To maintain the Register of Mediators referred to in Law No. 19,968, which creates the Family Courts, and to set the corresponding fee schedule.
26. To perform the remaining functions and exercise the other powers entrusted to it by law.

== Organization ==
The functional organizational structure of the Ministry is as follows:

=== Minister of Justice and Human Rights ===
==== Minister's Cabinet ====
- Office of Planning and Budget (Oficina de Planificación y Presupuesto)
  - Budget and Finance Department (Departamento de Presupuesto y Finanzas)
  - Information Technology Unit (Unidad de Informática)
  - Concessions Unit (Unidad de Concesiones)
  - Projects Unit (Unidad de Proyectos)
  - Planning and Management Control Unit (Unidad de Planificación y Control de Gestión)
- Communications Unit (Unidad de Comunicaciones)
- International Cooperation (Cooperación Internacional)
- Ministerial Audit (Auditoría Ministerial)
  - Internal Audit (Auditoría Interna)
  - Citizen Service Area (Área de Atención Ciudadana)
- Research and Coordination Unit (Unidad de Investigación y Coordinación)

=== Undersecretariats ===
- Undersecretariat of Justice (Subsecretaria de Justicia), whose function is to provide advice and direct collaboration to the Minister in the preparation of plans, programs, and decisions in the sector under its responsibility. In addition, it oversees the Regional Ministerial Secretariats of Justice and Human Rights (Secretarías Regionales Ministeriales, Seremis).
- Undersecretariat of Human Rights (Subsecretaria de Derechos Humanos), whose function is to provide advice and direct collaboration to the Minister of Justice and Human Rights in the design and development of policies, plans, and programs related to the promotion and protection of human rights.

=== Bodies under the Ministry's Authority ===
The public services and institutions that depend on the Ministry are as follows:

- Civil Registry and Identification Service (Servicio de Registro Civil e Identificación, SRCI)
- Legal Medical Service (Servicio Médico Legal, SML)
- National Service for Minors (Servicio Nacional de Menores, SENAME)
- Gendarmerie of Chile (Gendarmería de Chile, GENCHI)
- Public Criminal Defense Office (Defensoría Penal Pública, DPP)
- Judicial Assistance Corporations (Corporaciones de Asistencia Judicial, CAJ)
- Contracted Family Mediation (Mediación Familiar Licitado, MFL)
- National Council for the Protection of the Elderly

The National Council for the Protection of the Elderly (Consejo Nacional de Protección a la Ancianidad, better known by its acronym, Conapran) is a private, non-profit corporation, constituted by public deed on September 24, 1974. Its legal personality was granted by Supreme Decree No. 1232 of the Ministry of Justice, dated October 2, 1974. Its main function is to help improve the quality of life of low-income older adults in conditions of social vulnerability at the national level.

== Ministers of Justice of Chile ==
Minister	Party	Tenure
Government of Domingo Santa María
José Eugenio Vergara	PL	1881–1885
Emilio Crisólogo Varas	PR	1885–1886
Pedro Montt Montt	PN	1886
Government of José Manuel Balmaceda
Adolfo Valderrama Sáenz de la Peña	PL	1886–1887
Francisco Freire Caldera	PL	1887
Pedro Lucio Cuadra	PL	1887–1888
Federico Puga Borne	PL	1888
Julio Bañados Espinosa	PL	1888–1889
Federico Puga Borne	PL	1889
Isidoro Errázuriz Errázuriz	PL	1889–1890
Gregorio Donoso Vergara	PLD	1890
Rafael Casanova Casanova	PLD	1890
Ismael Pérez Montt	PLD	1890–1891
Francisco Concha Berguecio	PLD	1891
Government of Jorge Montt Álvarez
Isidoro Errázuriz Errázuriz	PL	1891
Federico Errázuriz Echaurren	PL	1891
Joaquín Walker Martínez	PC	1891
Isidoro Errázuriz Errázuriz	PL	1891–1892
Juan Castellón Larenas	PR	1892
Gaspar Toro Hurtado	PR	1892
Máximo del Campo Yávar	PC	1892–1893
Joaquín Rodríguez Rozas	PL	1893
Francisco Pinto Zañartu	PL	1893–1894
Federico Errázuriz Echaurren	PL	1894
Osvaldo Rengifo Vial	PL	1894–1895
Mariano Sánchez Fontecilla	PL	1895
Gaspar Toro Hurtado	PR	1895
Government of Federico Errázuriz Echaurren
Adolfo Ibáñez Gutiérrez	PL	1896
Federico Puga Borne	PL	1896–1897
José Domingo Amunátegui Rivera	PL	1897–1898
Augusto Orrego Luco	PL	1898
Juan Antonio Orrego	PL	1898
Carlos Palacios Zapata	PL	1898
Francisco Herboso España	PL	1899–1900
Emilio Bello Codecido	PLD	1900
Francisco Herboso España	PL	1900–1901
Ramón Vergara Donoso	PLD	1901
Ventura Carvallo Elizalde	PL	1901
Ramón Escobar Escobar	PLD	1901
Government of Germán Riesco Errázuriz
Manuel Ballesteros Ríos	PL	1901
Rafael Balmaceda Fernández	PLD	1901–1902
José Domingo Amunátegui Rivera	PL	1902–1903
Aníbal Sanfuentes Velasco	PLD	1903
Francisco Concha Berguecio	PLD	1903–1904
Efraín Vásquez Guarda	PLD	1904
Enrique Rodríguez Velásquez	PN	1904
Alejandro Fierro Pérez-Camino	PN	1904–1905
Javier Ángel Figueroa	PLD	1905
Antonio Huneeus Gana	PL	1905
Guillermo Pinto Agüero	PLD	1905–1906
Manuel Salas Lavaqui	PLD	1906
Samuel Claro Lastarria	PL	1906
Government of Pedro Montt Montt
Enrique Rodríguez Velásquez	PN	1906
Ramón Escobar Escobar	PLD	1906–1907
Óscar Viel Cavero	PLD	1907–1909
Emiliano Figueroa Larraín	PLD	1909
Government of Ramón Barros Luco
Domingo Amunátegui Solar	PL	1909–1911
Benjamín Montt Montt	PN	1911–1912
Arturo del Río Racet	PLD	1912
Enrique Villegas Echiburu	PLD	1912–1913
Aníbal Letelier Núñez	PLD	1913–1914
Absalón Valencia Zavala	PLD	1914–1915
Samuel Claro Lastarria	PL	1915
Gregorio Amunátegui Solar	PL	1915
Government of Juan Luis Sanfuentes
Augusto Orrego Luco	PL	1915–1916
Roberto Sánchez García de la Huerta	PLD	1916
Alberto Romero Herrera	PN	1916
Pedro Íñiguez Larraín	PLDo	1916–1917
Ángel Guarello Costa	PD	1917
Arturo Alemparte Quiroga	PN	1917–1918
Pedro Aguirre Cerda	PR	1918
Alcibíades Roldán Alvarez	PL	1918
Luis Orrego Luco	PR	1918–1919
Pablo Ramírez Rodríguez	PR	1919
Julio Prado Amor	PLD	1919
José Bernales Navarro	PD	1919–1920
Enrique Bermúdez de la Paz	PL	1920
Javier Gandarillas Matta	PR	1920
Lorenzo Montt Montt	PLDo	1920
Government of Arturo Alessandri Palma
Alberto Montt Montt	PL	1920
Armando Jaramillo Valderrama	PL	1920–1921
Tomás Ramírez Frías	PL	1921
Roberto Sánchez García de la Huerta	PLD	1921–1922
Octavio Maira González	PR	1922
Ángel Guarello Costa	PD	1922
Robinson Paredes Pacheco	PD	1922–1923
Carlos Alberto Ruiz Bahamonde	PR	1923
Luis Salas Romo	PR	1923
Marcial Martínez de Ferrari	PL	1923
Alcíbiades Roldán Álvarez	PL	1923–1924
Domingo Antonio Durán Morales	PR	1924
Guillermo Labarca Hubertson	PR	1924
Jorge Prieto Echaurren	PLD	1924
Luis Salas Romo	PR	1924
Gregorio Amunátegui Jordán	PL	1924
Government of Military Junta of 1924
Gregorio Amunátegui Jordán	PL	1924
José Bernales Navarro	PD	1924
José Maza Fernández	PLDo	1924
Government of Arturo Alessandri Palma
José Maza Fernández	PLDo	1925
Government of Luis Barros Borgoño (interino)
Oscar Fenner Marín	Militar	1925
Government of Emiliano Figueroa Larraín		
Alamiro Huidobro Valdés	PC	1925–1926
Alvaro Santa María	PLD	1926
Ramón Montero	PR	1926–1927
Aquiles Vergara Vicuña	PR	1927
Government of Carlos Ibáñez del Campo
Aquiles Vergara Vicuña	PR	1927
José Santos Salas	USRACH	1927
Enrique Balmaceda Toro	PLD	1927–1928
Osvaldo Koch Krefft	ind	1928–1930
David Hermosilla	PR	1930
Humberto Arce Bobadilla	PR	1930–1931
Antonio Planet Cordero	PC	1931
José Manuel Ríos Arias	PL	1931
Guillermo Edwards Matte	PL	1931
Alberto Edwards Vivas	PN	1931
Government of Pedro Opazo Letelier (interino)
Luis Gutiérrez Alliendes	PC	1931
Government of Juan Esteban Montero (interino)
Luis Gutiérrez Alliendes	PC	1931
Government of Manuel Trucco Franzzani (interino)
Luis Gutiérrez Alliendes	PC	1931
Horacio Walker Larraín	PC	1931
Government of Juan Esteban Montero
Luis Gutiérrez Alliendes	PC	1931–1932
Arturo Ureta Echazarreta	PC	1932
Government of the Socialist Republic of Chile
Pedro Antonio Fajardo Ulloa	PD	1932
Santiago Pérez Peña	PL	1932
Government of Carlos Dávila Espinoza
Santiago Pérez Peña	PL	1932
Guillermo Bañados Honorato	PD	1932
Government of Bartolomé Blanche Espejo (interino)
Juan Antonio Ríos Morales	PR	1932
Government of Abraham Oyanedel Urrutia (interino)
Absalón Valencia Zavala	PLD	1932
2.º Government of Arturo Alessandri Palma
Domingo Durán Morales	PR	1932–1934
Osvaldo Vial Vial	PL	1934–1935
Francisco Garcés Gana	PL	1935–1936
Humberto Álvarez Suárez	PL	1936
Pedro Freeman Caris	PR	1936–1937
Fernando Moller Bordeu	PR	1937
Alejandro Serani Burgos	PD	1937
Guillermo Correa Fuenzalida	PL	1937
Government of Pedro Aguirre Cerda
Raúl Puga Monsalve	PD	1938–1941
Domingo Godoy Pérez	PL	1941
Tomás Mora Pineda	PR	1941
Government of Jerónimo Méndez Arancibia (interino)
Tomás Mora Pineda	PR	1941–1942
Government of Juan Antonio Ríos Morales
Jerónimo Ortúzar Rojas	PD	1942
Oscar Gajardo Villarroel	ind	1942–1944
Benjamín Claro Velasco	PR	1944
Eugenio Puga Fisher	PD	1944–1945
Enrique Arriagada Saldías	PSA	1945–1946
Government of Alfredo Duhalde Vásquez (interim)
Arnaldo Carrasco Carrasco	Militar	1946
Fernando Moller Bordeu	PR	1946
Eugenio Puga Fisher	PD	1946
Government of Juan Antonio Iribarren (interino)
Eugenio Puga Fisher	PD	1946
Government of Gabriel González Videla
Guillermo Correa Fuenzalida	PL	1946–1947
Humberto Correa Labra	PR	1947
Eugenio Puga Fisher	PD	1947–1948
Luis Felipe Letelier Icaza	PCT	1948–1949
Juan Bautista Rossetti Colombino	PS	1949–1950
Eugenio Puga Fisher	PD	1950
Ruperto Puga Fisher	PD	1950
Humberto Parada Berger	PDa	1950–1952
Adriana Olguín de Baltra [1st female]	PR	1952
2.º Government of Carlos Ibáñez del Campo
Orlando Latorre González	PDP	1952–1953
Enrique Monti Forno	PSP	1953
Juan Gómez Millas	PAL	1953
Santiago Wilson Hernández	PDP	1953–1954
Osvaldo Koch Krefft	ind	1954–1955
Arturo Zúñiga Latorre	ind	1955
Mariano Fontecilla Varas	PNC	1955
Santiago Wilson Hernández	PDP	1955–1956
Mariano Fontecilla Varas	PNC	1956
Arturo Zúñiga Latorre	ind	1956–1957
Adrián Barrientos Villalobos	Militar	1957–1958
Luis Octavio Reyes Ugarte	ind	1958
Arturo Zúñiga Latorre	ind	1958
Osvaldo Saint Marie Sorucco	ind	1958
Óscar Acevedo Vega	ind	1958
Government of Jorge Alessandri Rodríguez
Julio Philippi Izquierdo	ind	1958–1960
Enrique Ortúzar Escobar	ind	1960–1964
Government of Eduardo Frei Montalva
Pedro Jesús Rodríguez González	PDC	1964–1968
William Thayer Arteaga	PDC	1968
Jaime Castillo Velasco	PDC	1968–1969
Máximo Pacheco Gómez	PDC	1969
Gustavo Dagoberto Lagos Matus	PDC	1969
Government of Salvador Allende Gossens
Lisandro Cruz Ponce	API	1970–1972
Manuel Sanhueza Cruz	PIR	1972
Jorge Tapia Valdés	PR	1972
Sergio Insunza Barrios	PCCh	1972–1973
Government of Augusto Pinochet Ugarte
Gonzalo Prieto Gándara	Independent	1973–1974
Hugo Musante Romero	Independent	1974–1975
Miguel Schweitzer Speisky	Independent	1975–1977
Renato Damilano Bonfante	Independent	1977
Mónica Madariaga Gutiérrez	Independent	1977–1983
Jaime del Valle Alliende	Independent	1983
Hugo Rosende Subiabre	Independent	1983–1990
Government of Patricio Aylwin Azócar
Francisco Cumplido Cereceda	PDC	1990–1994
Government of Eduardo Frei Ruiz-Tagle
Soledad Alvear Valenzuela	PDC	1994–1999
José Antonio Gómez Urrutia	PRSD	1999–2000
Government of Ricardo Lagos Escobar
José Antonio Gómez Urrutia	PRSD	2000–2003
Luis Bates Hidalgo	ind	2003–2006
1.º Government of Michelle Bachelet Jeria
Isidro Solís Palma	PRSD	2006–2007
Carlos Maldonado Curti	PRSD	2007–2010
1.º Government of Sebastián Piñera Echenique
Felipe Bulnes Serrano	RN	2010–2011
Teodoro Ribera Neumann	RN	2011–2012
Patricia Pérez Goldberg	ind	2012–2014
2.º Government of Michelle Bachelet Jeria
José Antonio Gómez Urrutia	PRSD	2014–2015
Javiera Blanco Suárez	Ind-PDC	2015–2016
Jaime Campos Quiroga	PRSD	2016–2018
2.º Government of Sebastián Piñera Echenique
Hernán Larraín Fernández	UDI	2018–2022
Government of Gabriel Boric
Marcela Ríos	CS	2022–2023
Luis Cordero Vega	Ind.	2023-2024
Jaime Gajardo Falcón	PC	2024-2026
Government of José Antonio Kast
Fernando Rabat	Ind.	2026–present

== See also ==
- Justice ministry
- Politics of Chile
