= Echaurren =

Echaurren is a surname. Notable people with the surname include:

- Eulogia Echaurren (1830–1887), First Lady of Chile
- Federico Errázuriz Echaurren (1850-1901), Chilean lawyer and politician
- Jorge Prieto Echaurren (1873–1953), Chilean lawyer and politician
- Pablo Echaurren (born 1951), Italian painter
