= Jorge Montt =

11th President of Chile (1891–1896)

Admiral Jorge Montt
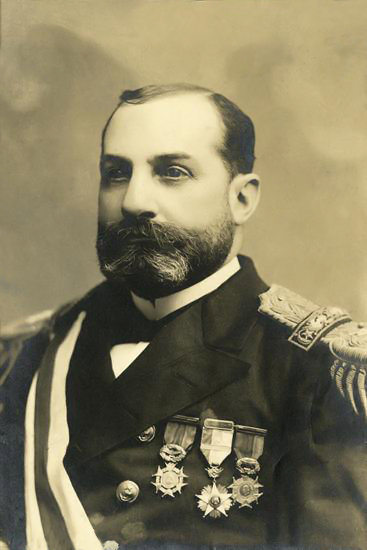

12th President of Chile
- In office December 26, 1891 – September 18, 1896
- Preceded by: Himself (as President of the Government Junta); José Manuel Balmaceda (as President)
- Succeeded by: Federico Errázuriz Echaurren

President of Government Junta of Chile
- In office August 31, 1891 – December 26, 1891
- Preceded by: Manuel Baquedano (as Accidental Chief)
- Succeeded by: Himself (as president)

Personal details
- Born: April 26, 1845 Casablanca, Chile
- Died: October 8, 1922 (aged 77) Santiago, Chile
- Party: none
- Spouse: Leonor Frederick Ledesma
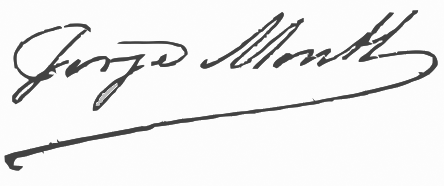
- Signature

Jorge Montt Álvarez (Latin American Spanish: [ˈxoɾxe ˈmont]; April 26, 1845 – October 8, 1922) was a vice admiral in the Chilean Navy and president of Chile from 1891 to 1896.

== Early life ==
Born in Casablanca, Chile, he was a nephew of former Chilean president Manuel Montt, and a cousin of future president Pedro Montt. After graduating from the naval academy in 1861, he served in the Chincha Islands War (1864–1866) and the War of the Pacific (1879–1883). He led the 1891 Chilean Civil War against President José Manuel Balmaceda to become provisional leader and eventually president in 1891.

== Presidency ==
The close of the revolution against Balmaceda left the government of Chile in the hands of the junta under whose guidance the military and naval operations had been organized. Admiral Jorge Montt had been the head of this revolutionary committee, and he acted as president of the provisional government when the administration of the country changed hands after the victory of the Congressional party. An election was then immediately ordered to elect the president of the republic as well as representatives in the senate and chamber of deputies. Admiral Montt, as head of the executive power, staunchly refused to allow official influence to be brought to bear in any way in the presidential campaign. The great majority of the voters, however, required no pressure to decide who was in their opinion the man most fit to administer the affairs of the republic.

An election was held, and Admiral Montt was duly chosen by a nearly unanimous vote to be chief magistrate for the remaining time of the constitutional term of five years, till September 18, 1896. The senate and chamber of deputies were formally constituted in due course, and the government of the republic resumed normal conditions of existence. The new president showed admirable tact in dealing with the difficult problem he was called upon to face. Party feeling still ran high between the partisans of the two sides of the recent conflict. Admiral Montt took the view that it was politic and just to let bygones be bygones, and he acted conscientiously by this principle in all administrative measures in connection with the supporters of the late President Balmaceda. Early in 1892, amnesty was granted to the officers of the Balmaceda regime, and they were freely permitted to return to Chile without any attempts made against them. The first political act of national importance of the new government was the granting of control to the municipalities, which hitherto had possessed little power to direct local affairs and were not even permitted to make spending decisions of the municipal revenues to any important amount without first obtaining the consent of the central government. Almost absolute power was now given these corporations to manage their own concerns, and the organization of the police was placed in their hands; at a later period, however, it was found necessary to modify this latter condition.

Rear-Admiral Jorge Montt

President Montt next turned his attention towards the question of how to best repair the damage caused to the country by eight months of civil warfare. The plan of public works authorized in 1887 was reconsidered, and the construction of portions of the various undertakings recommenced. The army and navy were reorganized. Additional instructors were brought from Germany, and all arms of the military service were placed on a thoroughly efficient footing in matters of drill and discipline. Several new and powerful cruisers were added to the navy, and the internal economy of this branch of the national defence was thoroughly inspected; many defects were remedied.

President Montt then took in hand the question of a reform of the currency, the abolition of nonconvertible paper money, and the re-establishment of a gold monetary standard for the republic. This reform of the currency became the keynote of the president's policy during the remainder of his term of office. Great opposition was raised by the representatives of the debtor class in congress to the suppression of the nonconvertible paper money, but in the end President Montt carried the day, and on February 11, 1895 a measure finally became law establishing a gold currency as the only tender in Chile. In July 1896, the Conversion Act was put in force, a dollar of 18d. being the monetary unit adopted.

In 1895, relations with the neighbouring republic of Argentina began to become somewhat strained in regard to the interpretation of the treaty concerning the boundary between the two countries. The treaties of 1881, 1893 and 1895 left doubts in the minds of both Chileans and Argentines as to the position of the frontier line. In May of the same year, he founded the Military Museum of Chile, the predecessor of the current Chilean Historical and Military Museum. On April 17, 1896, another protocol was drawn up, by which the contending parties agreed to submit any differences to the arbitration of Great Britain, at the instance of one or both governments. President Montt had now fulfilled his term of office, and on September 18, 1896 he handed over the presidential power to his successor, Federico Errázuriz Echaurren, who had been duly elected in the month of June previously.

== Cabinet ==
Portfolio	Minister	Took office	Left office	Party
Government Junta
Minister of the Interior	Manuel José Yrarrázaval	8 September 1891	31 December 1891	Conservative
Minister of Foreign Affairs	Manuel Antonio Matta	12 September 1891	31 December 1891	Radical
Minister of Justice and Public Instruction	Isidoro Errázuriz	8 September 1891	31 December 1891	Liberal
Minister of War and Navy	Adolfo Holley	8 September 1891	31 December 1891	Liberal
Minister of Finance	Joaquín Walker Martínez	8 September 1891	31 December 1891	Conservative
Minister of Industry and Public Works	Agustín Edwards Ross	15 September 1891	31 December 1891	National
Barros-Pereira Ministry
Minister of the Interior	Ramón Barros Luco	31 December 1891	14 March 1892	Liberal
Minister of Foreign Affairs	Luis Pereira Cotapos	31 December 1891	14 March 1892	Conservative
Minister of Justice and Public Instruction	Juan Castellón Larenas	31 December 1891	14 March 1892	Radical
Minister of War and Navy	Ventura Blanco Viel	31 December 1891	14 March 1892	Conservative
Minister of Finance	Francisco Valdés Vergara	31 December 1891	14 March 1892	Liberal
Minister of Industry and Public Works	Agustín Edwards Ross	31 December 1891	14 March 1892	National
Matte-Castellón Ministry
Minister of the Interior	Eduardo Matte	14 March 1892	9 June 1892	Liberal
Minister of Foreign Affairs	Juan Castellón Larenas	14 March 1892	11 June 1892	Radical
Minister of Justice and Public Instruction	Gaspar Toro Hurtado	14 March 1892	11 June 1892	Liberal
Minister of War and Navy	Luis Barros Borgoño	14 March 1892	11 June 1892	Liberal
Minister of Finance	Agustín Edwards Ross	14 March 1892	11 June 1892	National
Minister of Industry and Public Works	Jorge Riesco Errázuriz	14 March 1892	11 June 1892	Liberal
Barros-Errázuriz Ministry
Minister of the Interior	Ramón Barros Luco	9 June 1892	22 April 1893	Liberal
Minister of Foreign Affairs	Isidoro Errázuriz	11 June 1892	22 April 1893	Liberal
Minister of Justice and Public Instruction	Máximo del Campo	11 June 1892	22 April 1893	National
Minister of War and Navy	Luis Arteaga Ramírez	11 June 1892	22 September 1893	Liberal
Minister of War and Navy	Francisco Pinto Cruz	4 October 1892	22 April 1893	Liberal
Minister of Finance	Enrique Mac Iver	11 June 1892	22 April 1893	Radical
Minister of Industry and Public Works	Vicente Dávila Larraín	11 June 1892	22 April 1893	Liberal
Montt-Blanco Ministry
Minister of the Interior	Pedro Montt	22 April 1893	26 April 1894	National
Minister of Foreign Affairs	Ventura Blanco Viel	22 April 1893	26 April 1894	Conservative
Minister of Justice and Public Instruction	Joaquín Rodríguez Rozas	22 April 1893	6 October 1893	Radical
Minister of Justice and Public Instruction	Francisco Pinto Cruz	6 October 1893	26 April 1894	Liberal
Minister of War and Navy	Isidoro Errázuriz	22 April 1893	7 August 1893	Liberal
Minister of War and Navy	Manuel Villamil	7 August 1893	6 October 1893	National
Minister of War and Navy	Juan Antonio Orrego	6 October 1893	26 April 1894	Liberal
Minister of Finance	Alejandro Vial	22 April 1893	26 April 1894	Conservative
Minister of Industry and Public Works	Vicente Dávila Larraín	22 April 1893	26 April 1894	Liberal
Mac Iver-Sánchez Ministry
Minister of the Interior	Enrique Mac Iver	26 April 1894	7 December 1894	Radical
Minister of Foreign Affairs	Mariano Sánchez Fontecilla	26 April 1894	7 December 1894	Liberal
Minister of Justice and Public Instruction	Federico Errázuriz Echaurren	26 April 1894	29 October 1894	Liberal
Minister of War and Navy	Santiago Aldunate	26 April 1894	7 December 1894	Liberal
Minister of Finance	Carlos Riesco Errázuriz	26 April 1894	7 December 1894	Liberal
Minister of Industry and Public Works	Manuel Antonio Prieto	26 April 1894	7 December 1894	Radical
Barros-Barros Ministry
Minister of the Interior	Ramón Barros Luco	7 December 1894	1 August 1895	Liberal
Minister of Foreign Affairs	Luis Barros Borgoño	7 December 1894	1 August 1895	Liberal
Minister of Justice and Public Instruction	Osvaldo Rengifo	18 December 1894	1 August 1895	Liberal
Minister of War and Navy	Carlos Rivera Jofré	7 December 1894	1 August 1895	Liberal
Minister of Finance	Manuel Fernández Pradel	7 December 1894	1 August 1895	Liberal
Minister of Industry and Public Works	Elías Fernández Albano	7 December 1894	1 August 1895	National
Recabarren-Matte Ministry
Minister of the Interior	Manuel Recabarren	1 August 1895	24 November 1895	Radical
Minister of Foreign Affairs	Claudio Matte	1 August 1895	24 November 1895	Liberal
Minister of Justice and Public Instruction	Mariano Sánchez Fontecilla	1 August 1895	24 November 1895	Liberal
Minister of War and Navy	Ismael Valdés	1 August 1895	24 November 1895	Liberal
Minister of Finance	Enrique Mac Iver	1 August 1895	24 November 1895	Radical
Minister of Industry and Public Works	Juan Miguel Dávila	1 August 1895	24 November 1895	Liberal
Rengifo-Guerrero Ministry
Minister of the Interior	Osvaldo Rengifo	24 November 1895	18 September 1896	Liberal
Minister of Foreign Affairs	Adolfo Guerrero Vergara	16 January 1896	18 September 1896	Liberal
Minister of Justice and Public Instruction	Gaspar Toro Hurtado	24 November 1895	18 September 1896	Liberal
Minister of War and Navy	Luis Barros Borgoño	24 November 1895	18 September 1896	Liberal
Minister of Finance	Hermógenes Pérez de Arce Lopetegui	24 November 1895	18 September 1896	Liberal
Minister of Industry and Public Works	Elías Fernández Albano	24 November 1895	18 September 1896	National

== Post-presidency ==
Montt served as commander of the Chilean Navy from 1897 until his retirement in 1913. He then served as mayor of Valparaíso from 1915 to 1918. He died in Santiago in 1922.

== See also ==
- 1891 Chilean Civil War
- Montt family

== Notes ==
Political offices
Preceded by None	President of Government Junta; 1891	Succeeded by None
Preceded by Manuel Baquedano	President of Chile; 1891–1896	Succeeded by Federico Errázuriz Echaurren
Military offices
Preceded by Luis Castillo Goñi	Navy General Director; 1897–1913	Succeeded by Luis Goñi Simpson
