= Aquiles Vergara =

Chilean politician

Minister of Justice and Public Education
- In office 9 February 1927 – 6 September 1927
- President: Emiliano Figueroa
- Preceded by: Ramón Montero
- Succeeded by: José Santos Salas

Member of the Chamber of Deputies
- In office 15 May 1921 – 15 May 1924
- Constituency: Coquimbo

Personal details
- Born: 12 June 1895 Viña del Mar, Chile
- Died: 10 March 1968 (aged 72) La Paz, Bolivia
- Spouse: Ana Petre
- Profession: Military officer

Aquiles Vergara Vicuña (12 June 1895 – 10 March 1968) was a Chilean military officer, writer, and Radical Party politician. He served as a member of the Chamber of Deputies of Chile from 1921 to 1924 and as Minister of Justice and Public Instruction in 1927.

Vergara published a volume of writings on his experiences of visiting various Iberian cities. In 1927, he published a book bringing together his speeches on educational reform and material concerning his tenure as Minister of Justice and Public Instruction.

He later became served in the Bolivian Army during the Chaco War, from 1932 to 1935. Since 30s, Vergara spent his later life in Bolivia and died in La Paz in 1968, aged 72.
