= Luis Ayala =

Luis Ayala may refer to:

- Luis Ayala (baseball) (born 1978), Mexican baseball player
- Luis Ayala Poblete (fl. 1920s), Chilean trade union leader and politician
- Luis Ayala (politician), Chilean socialist politician
- Luis Ayala (tennis) (1932–2024), Chilean tennis player
