= Imperial German influence on Chile =

German people, culture, science and institutions have greatly influenced Chile. Following the Chilean independence in 1818, German influence increased gradually with Imperial Germany effectively displacing France as the prime role model for Chile in the second half of the 19th century.

Intense German influence around the turn of the century faced also some criticism as exemplified when Eduardo de la Barra wrote disparagingly about a "German bewitchment". For this critique, de la Barra was himself labelled a "romanizer" by critics. Influence peaked in the decades before World War I, and the prestige of Germany and German things in Chile remained high after the war but did not recover to its pre-war levels.

Institutions like the Chilean Army and Instituto Pedagógico were also heavily influenced by Germany.

== Science and education ==
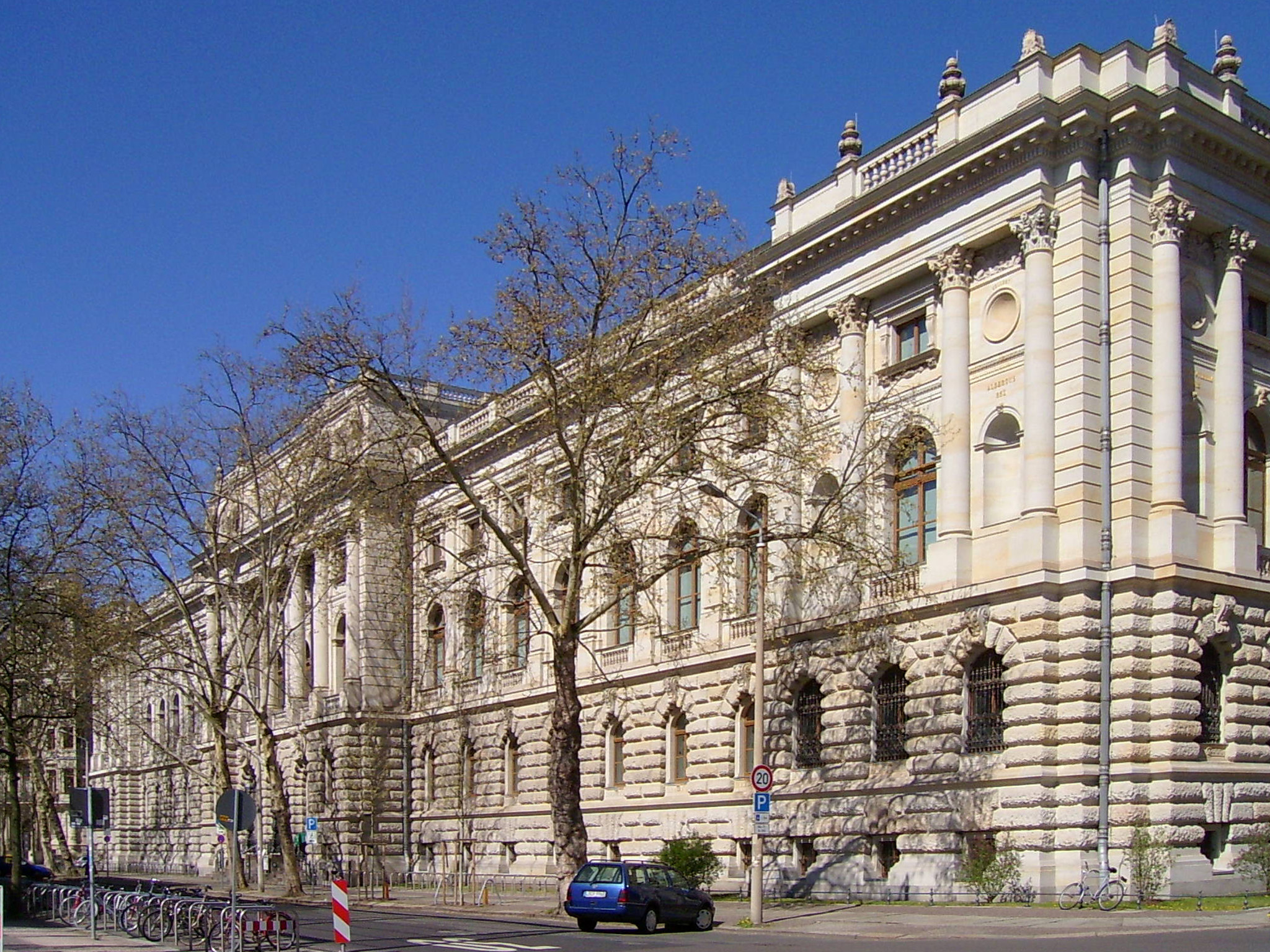
The University of Leipzig was the first to create an experimental laboratory of psychology and inspired professors Mann and Schneider to create the first university simile in Chile under the tutelage of Wilhelm Wundt himself.

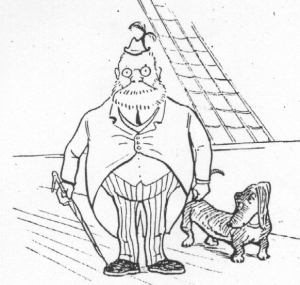
The character Federico Von Pilsener, created by Pedro Subercaseaux and featured in a Chilean comic strip in 1906 and 1907, is based on stereotypes of Germans during a time of strong German influence in Chile.

In the 19th century, the scientific community of Chile had a strong presence of German expatriates, and Germans were the second most common group of foreign engineers after the British. German scientists had prominent roles in the National Museum of Natural History and the National Astronomical Observatory in addition to having a local all-German scientific society; the Sociedad Científica Alemana de Santiago. In 1883, Chile sent a delegation to study the educational system of Prussia, with the aim of improving scientific education in the country and ultimately reduce Catholic influence in the education system as it was perceived as an obstacle for scientific education. Three men, Valentín Letelier, Claudio Matte and José Abelardo Núñez were sent to Berlin to investigate the development of education in Germany. In 1885 180 German schoolteachers arrived to Chile. Among the arrivals were the linguist Rodolfo Lenz, the geographer Hans Steffen and the pedagogists Augusto Tafelmacher and Jorge Schneider. Steffen's work about the continental divide was instrumental to the Chilean argument in the 1902 Arbitral award of the Andes between Argentina and Chile. These efforts culminated with the establishment of the Instituto Pedagógico de Santiago in 1899.

== Military emulation of Imperial Germany ==
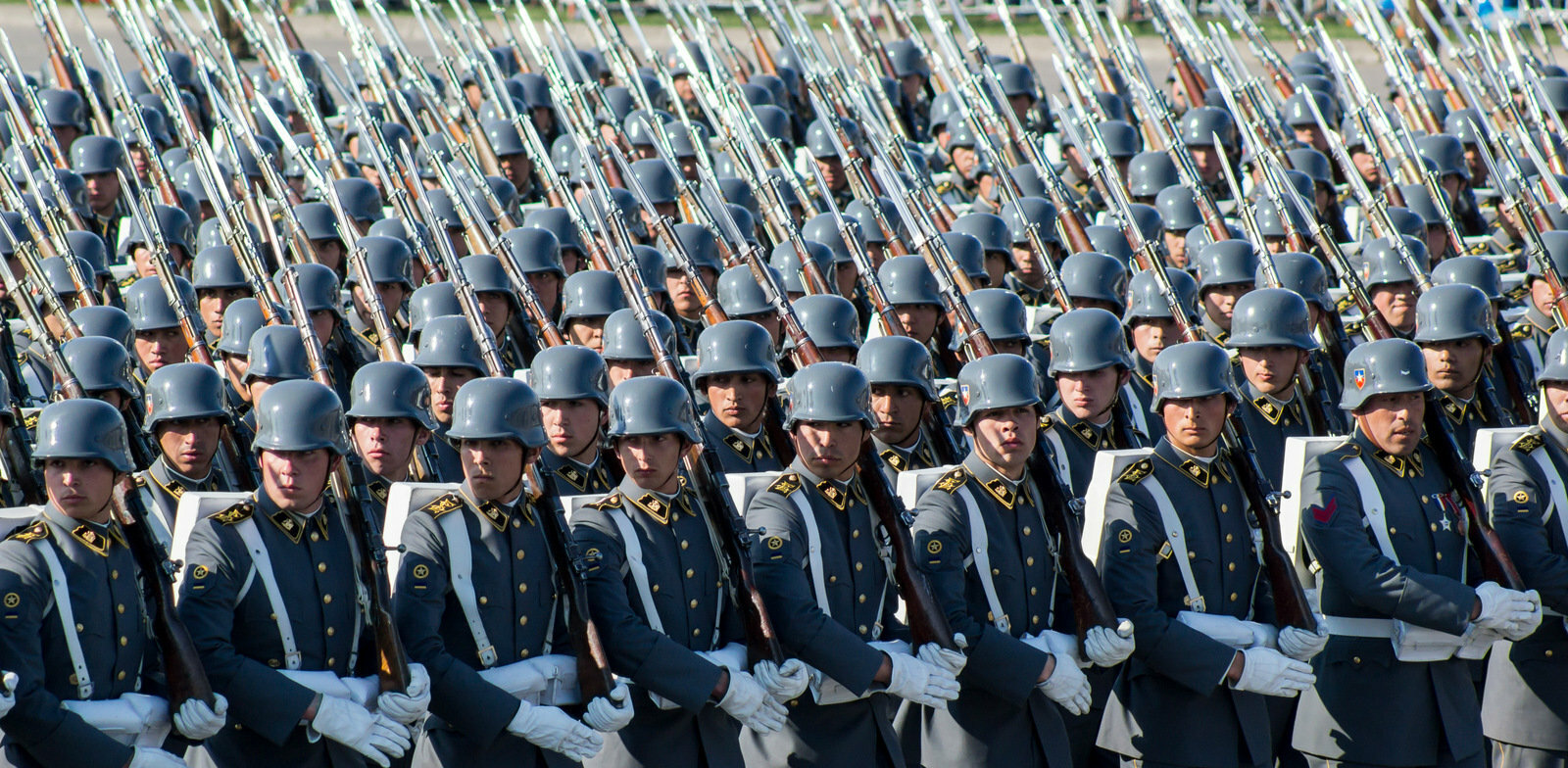
Noncommissioned Officers' School on 19 September 2014

During the War of the Pacific, many high-ranking officers won valuable insights into the state of the army and became aware that the army required rebuilding. Losses, material destruction, and organizational flaws regarding strategic planning and officer training, were noted by officers like Emilio Sotomayor and Patricio Lynch, who approached President Santa María arguing the need of good schools and technical departments for the military. Another factor that supported the emulation, the deliberate systematic imitation of the military technology, organisation, and doctrine of one country by another (Note: Joao Resende-Santos in Neorealism, States, and the Modern Mass Army (page 3, 9-10) uses "emulation" instead of "prussianization" as a broader term. He says: "Crossnational emulation occurs in a wide variety of areas and by an equal variety of state and nonstate entities ... Emulation in all forms, by firms or states whether in economic or military areas is driven by the same pressures of competition and based in the same political criterion.") was the danger of war with Argentina. The emulation was backed by a broad coalition of civil and military leaders.

Chile hired a French military training mission in 1858, and the Chilean legation in Berlin was instructed to find a training mission during the War of the Pacific in 1881. But large-scale emulation of the Prussian Army began in 1886 with the appointment of Captain Emil Körner, a graduate of the renowned Kriegsakademie in Berlin. Also appointed were 36 Prussian officers to train officer cadets in the Chilean Military Academy. The training occurred in three phases; the first took place from 1885 to 1891 during the presidency of Domingo Santa María, the second was the post-civil-war phase, and the third was the 1906 reorganization.

The emulation was focused in armaments, conscription, officer recruitment and instruction, and general staff organization as well as military doctrine (adopted in 1906). It was extended also into military logistics and medical services, promotions, retirement, salary regulation and even uniforms (adopted in 1904), marching styles, helmets, parades, and military music. (Note: The Chilean Historical and Military Museum in Santiago has a section devoted to Prussian influence in the Chilean Army.)

Prior to 1883, the army was equipped with a variety of rifles, mostly French and Belgian origin. From 1892 to 1902, the Chilean-Argentine Arms Race, marked the peak of Chilean arms purchase. 100,000 Mauser rifles and new Krupp artillery were bought for 3,000,000 marks (ℳ︁) in 1893, 2,000,000 marks in 1895 and 15,000,000 marks in 1898. Ammunition factories and small arms manufacturing plants were established.

Like others armies in South America, Chile had had a small army of long-term service officers and soldiers. In 1900, Chile became the first country in Latin America to enforce a system of compulsory military service, whereby training, initially five to eighteen months (Germany: three years), took place in zones of divisional organization in order to create a solid military structure that could be easily doubled with well-trained and combat-ready reserve forces. Budgetary restrictions prevented the full impact of the law: the service fell disproportionately on the lower classes, no more than 20% of the contingent was incorporated annually, and former conscripts were not retrained periodically.

The beginning of the German mission was dedicated almost exclusively to the organization and implementation of a standardized, technically oriented military education with the essence of Moltke's German military system of continuous study of artillery, infantry, cartography, history, topography, logistics, tactics, etc., for a modern, professional and technically trained officer corps. In 1886, the "Academia de Guerra" (War Academy) was founded "to elevate the level of technical and scientific instruction of army officers, in order that they be able, in case of war, to utilize the advantages of new methods of combat and new armaments". The best alumni were candidates for general staff service. By the mid-1890s Körner organized the courses for a Noncommissioned Officers' School (Escuela de Suboficiales y Clases).

During the 1891 Chilean Civil War Körner was removed from duty by José Manuel Balmaceda. He and his followers set sail north to join the Congressional forces in Iquique. He became chief architect of the new army and, though Estanislao del Canto formally was commander-in-chief, Körner led the rebel forces in the major clashes of the civil war.

Chile had had a General Staff during the War of the Pacific. Körner turned his attention to a permanent institution in 1893-94 that should replace the old "Inspector General del Ejército", but with control over military affairs in peacetime and wartime. It had four sections: Instruction and Discipline, Military Schools, Scientific Works (strategic and operational planning), and Administration.

== Political influence ==
Despite influence attempts by the German Empire the German community in Chile, including settlers in southern Chile, did not act as an extension of the German state to any significant degree. On a geopolitical level, the German Empire attempted to promote Chile into a regional counterweight to the United States. Indeed, Britain and Germany managed through Chilean diplomacy to have Ecuador deny the United States a naval base in the Galápagos Islands.

== See also ==
- Prussianism
