= Raúl Puga =

Chilean politician (1891–?)

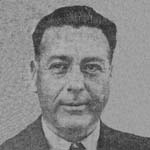

Minister of Labor
- In office 15 January 1942 – 4 February 1942
- President: Juan Antonio Ríos

Minister of Agriculture
- In office 10 June 1941 – 2 April 1942
- President: Pedro Aguirre Cerda; Jerónimo Méndez

Minister of Education
- In office 12 June 1939 – 29 June 1939
- President: Pedro Aguirre Cerda

Minister of Justice
- In office 24 December 1938 – 10 June 1941
- President: Pedro Aguirre Cerda
- Succeeded by: Domingo Godoy

Member of the Senate of Chile
- In office 21 May 1933 – 21 May 1937
- Constituency: 7th Provincial Grouping

Personal details
- Born: 5 December 1891 Arauco, Chile
- Party: Democratic Party
- Spouse: Rebeca Seguel
- Children: 2

Luis Raúl Puga Monsalve (born 5 December 1891) was a Chilean lawyer and politician who served in the Senate of Chile from 1933 to 1937, as a member of the Democratic Party. He also held multiple ministerial roles.

== Early life and education ==
Luis Raúl Puga Monsalve was born in Arauco, Chile, on 5 December 1891, to Manuel Puga and Griselda Monsalve. He married Rebeca Seguel, with whom he had two children. He studied at the Seminario de Concepción and graduated from the University of Chile with a law degree; he was admitted as a lawyer on 6 July 1915.

Puga was an administrative law professor at the Liceo de Concepción. He worked as a lawyer for shipping, timber, telephone, and railway companies.

== Career ==
In the 1932 Chilean general election Puga, a member of the Democratic Party, was elected to the Senate of Chile representing the 7th prvoincial district Ñuble and Concepción. During his tenure he served as chair of the Labor and Social Security committee.

President Pedro Aguirre Cerda appointed Puga as Minister of Justice in 1938 and served until 1941. He also served as Minister of Education in 1939, and Minister of Agriculture from 1941 to 1942. He was the interim Minister of Labor in 1942.

== Works cited ==
- "Luis Raúl Puga Monsalve". Library of the National Congress of Chile. Archived from the original on 16 October 2026.
