= Roberto Matta =

Chilean painter (1911–2002)

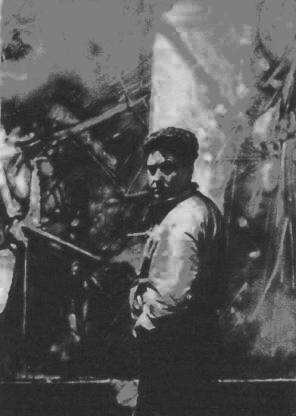
- Matta in 1960
- Born: Roberto Antonio Sebástian Matta-Echaurren; November 11, 1911; Santiago, Chile
- Died: November 23, 2002 (aged 91); Civitavecchia, Italy
- Education: architecture and interior design at the Pontificia Universidad Católica de Chile
- Known for: Painting
- Movement: Surrealism
- Awards: Praemium Imperiale

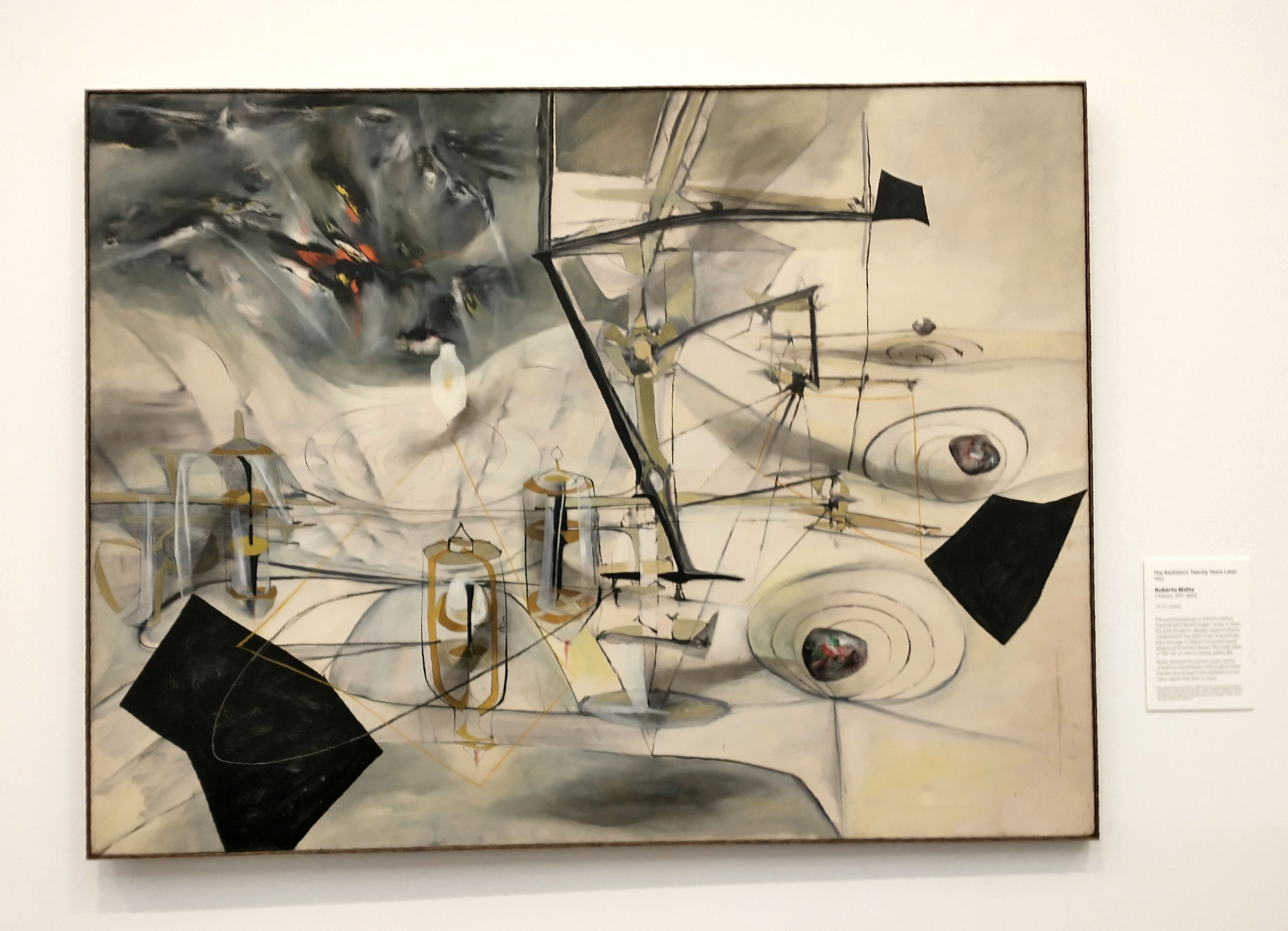
The Bachelors Twenty Years Later, painting by Roberto Matta, 1943. Psychological Morphologies series. Philadelphia Museum of Art.

Roberto Antonio Sebástian Matta-Echaurren (Spanish: [roˈβeɾto ˈmata]; November 11, 1911 – November 23, 2002), usually known simply as Matta, also as Sebastián Matta or Roberto Matta, was one of Chile's best-known painters and figures in 20th century surrealist art across the Americas and Europe.

== Biography ==
Matta was of Spanish, Basque and French descent. Born in Santiago, he studied architecture and interior design at the Pontificia Universidad Católica de Chile in Santiago, and graduated in 1935. That spring, he journeyed from Peru to Panama and completed surreal drawings of many of the geographical features he witnessed. He first encountered Europe while serving in the Merchant Marine after graduating. His travels in Europe and the USA led him to meet artists such as Arshile Gorky, René Magritte, Salvador Dalí, André Breton, and Le Corbusier.

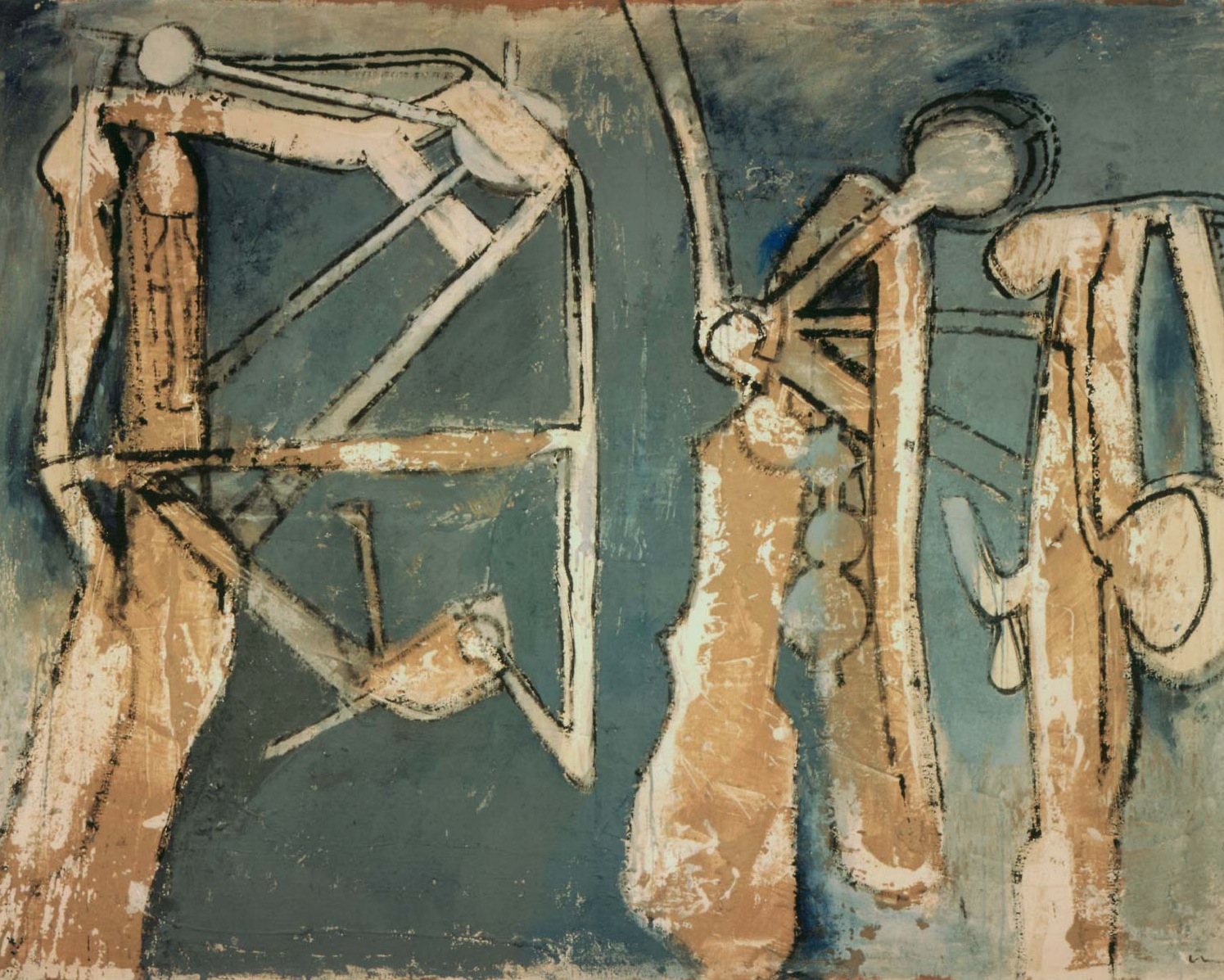
Roberto Matta, Three Figures, 1958c, M.T. Abraham Foundation.

It was Breton who provided the major spur to the Chilean's direction in art, encouraging his work and introducing him to the leading members of the Paris Surrealist movement. Matta produced illustrations and articles for Surrealist journals such as Minotaure. During this period he was introduced to the work of many prominent contemporary European artists, such as Pablo Picasso and Marcel Duchamp.

The first true flowering of Matta's own art came in 1938, when he moved from drawing to the oil painting for which he is best known. This period coincided with his emigration to the United States, where he lived until 1948. His early paintings, such as Invasion of the Night, give an indication of the work he would continue, with diffuse light patterns and bold lines on a featureless background. This is also the period of the "inscape" series, and the closely related "psychological morphologies". Prof. Claude Cernuschi (see Boston College Matta exhibition external link below) writes, "Matta's key ambition to represent and evoke the human psyche in visual form was filtered through the writings of Freud and the psychoanalytic view of the mind as a three-dimensional space: the 'inscape'." According to the essay on Matta in Crosscurrents of Modernism (see references below), the inscapes' evocative forms "are visual analogies for the artist's psyche" (p. 241). During the 1940s and 1950s, the disturbing state of world politics found reflection in Matta's work, with the canvases becoming busy with images of electrical machinery and distressed figures. The addition of clay to Matta's paintings in the early 1960s lent an added dimension to the distortions.

In his art Matta creates new dimensions in a blend of organic and cosmic lifeforms (see biomorphism). He was one of the first artists to take this abstract leap.

Elle Loge La Folie, oil on canvas, 1970.

Matta's connections with Breton's surrealist movement were severed following a profound disagreement concerning Arshile Gorky and his family. Matta was accused of indirectly causing Gorky's suicide (in response to Matta's relationship with the Armenian-American painter's wife). This led to his expulsion from the group, but by this time Matta's own name was becoming widely known. He divided his life between Europe and South America during the 1950s and 1960s, successfully combining the political and the semi-abstract in epic surreal canvases. Matta believed that art and poetry can change lives, and was very involved in the social movements of the 1960s and 1970s. He was a strong supporter of the socialist government of president Salvador Allende in Chile. A 4x24 meter mural of his entitled The First Goal of the Chilean People, was painted over with 16 coats of paint by the military regime of Augusto Pinochet following their violent overthrow of Salvador Allende in 1973. In 2005 the mural was discovered by local officials. In 2008 the mural was completely restored at a cost of $43,000, and it is displayed today in Santiago at the La Granja city hall.

Throughout his life, Matta worked with many different types of media, including ceramic, photography, and video production.

Matta died in Civitavecchia, Italy on 23 November 2002, eleven days after his 91st birthday.

Matta was married twice: his first wife was Patricia Matta Echaurren (née O'Connell), an American (who later married Pierre Matisse), and his second wife was Germana Ferrari. He is the father of six children. Two died prematurely, leaving his creative legacy to artists Gordon Matta-Clark and his twin brother Sebastian, Ramuntcho Matta, Federica Matta, designer Alisée and artist and writer Pablo Echaurren, whose surname was wrongly recorded at birth.

== Exhibitions (selection) ==
=== Group shows ===
In 2019, his work was included in the group show The Gift of Art, at Pérez Art Museum Miami. The exhibition highlighted important artworks within PAMM's permanent collection on Latino and Latin American artists. Among the artists featured in the exhibition were José Bedia (Cuba), Teresa Margolles (Mexico), Carmen Herrera (Cuba), Oscar Murillo (Colombia), Amelia Peláez (Cuba), Zilia Sánchez (Cuba), Tunga (Brazil) and Wifredo Lam (Cuba).

== Selected list of works ==
- Sick Flesh (ca. 1932–1933)
- The Clown (1934)
- Untitled (Payasa) (1935)
- Panama and Wet Sheets (1936)
- La Forêt, Snail’s Trace, Composición Azul, Scénario No. 1: Succion Panique du Soleil and Morphology (1937)
- The Red Sun, Space Travel (Star Travel), To Both of You, Crucifixión (Crucifixion), several works titled Psychological Morphology and Morphology of Desire (1938)
- more works titled Psychological Morphology and Water (1939)
- Dark Light (1940)
- Invasion of the Night, Ecouter Vivre, Théorie de l’Arbre, Composition Abstraite, The Initiation (Origine d’un Extrême) and Foeu (1941)
- The Hanged Man, The End of Everything, The Disasters of Mysticism and The Apples we Know (1942)
- L’Oeyx, El Día es un Atentado and Redness of Lead (1943)
- Cover art for the final issue of the magazine VVV, To Escape the Absolute, Et At It, Le Glaive et la Parole and Poing d’Hurlement (1944)
- La Femme Affamée, Abstracto, The Heart Players and Rêve ou Morte (1945)
- Le Pélerin du Doute and A Grave Situation (1946)
- Accidentalité, Metamatician # 12 and Black Mirror (1947)
- Wound Interrogation and The Prophet (1948)
- La Revécue and Woman Looked At (1949)
- C’Ontra Vosotvos Asesinon de Palomas (1950)
- Ne Songe Plus à Fuir and Les Roses Sont Belles (1951)
- L'horreur du mal, L'ultime, L'ennemi interieur, La memoria cosmica (1951)
- Pecador Justificado and Eclosion (1952)
- Le plus libre (1952)
- Morning on Earth, Hills a Poppin, The Murder of the Rosenbergs, L’Hosticier and L’Apetite de Primer (1953)
- Abrir los Brazos Como se Abren los Ojos, Bud Sucker, The Chess Player, L’Atout and Tados Juntos en la Tierra (1954)
- Le Long Pont, Spearcing of the Grain, L’Engin dans l’Éminence and Intervision (1955)
- Banale de Venise, Heart Malitte, Fleur de Midi and Le Pianiste (1956)
- Le Point d’Ombre, L’Impencible, The And of Think and Ciel Volante (1957)
- La Chasse Spirituelle (started in 1957), Être Cible Nous Monde, L’Etang de No, The Infancy of Concentration, Les Eviteurs and Le Courier (1958)
- Un Soleil à Qui Sait Reunir, Les Faiseurs du Neant, Gay Above All, The Clan and L’Impensable (Grand Personage) (1959)
- Couple IV (started in 1959), Être Atout (five part suite), Vers l’Universe, Ciudad Cósmica and Design of Intuition (1960)
- Vivir Enfrentando las Flechas (1961)
- Les Moyens du Creafeur, Claustrophobic Vaincue and Mal de Terre (1962)
- Eve Vielle (1963)
- Éros Semens (triptych, started in 1962) and La Luz del Proscrito (started in 1963) (1964)
- La Térre Uni (1965)
- Le où A Marée Haute and La Promenade de Vénus (1966)
- Signe of the Times and Morire per Amore (1967)
- Malitte (modular furniture set designed between 1966 and 1968) and La Caza de Adolescentes (1968)
- Lieberos, Nude Hiding in the Forest and Verginosamente (1969)
- Elle Logela Folie, Je-ographie, El Hombre de la Lampara and MAgriTTA Chair (1970)
- Otto Por Tre, El primer gol del pueblo chileno and Paralelles de la Viel (1971)
- Coigitum and The Upheaval of One’s Ocean (1972)
- La Vida Allende la Muerte, Senile d’Incertitude, Migration des Révoltes and Hom’mer (Chaosmos) (suite of ten etchings with aquatint) (1973)
- Explosant Fixe, Je M’Espionne, Deep Mars, L’Aube Permanente and Cadran d’Incendies (1974)
- Mas Ceilin and Illumine le Temps (1975)
- Wake (started in 1974), Une d’Une and Les Voix des Temples (1976)
- Rooming Life, L’Ombre de l’Invisible and Ouvre l’Instant (1977)
- Carré-four and Dedalopolous (1978)
- Polimorfologia (1979)
- Il Proprio Corno Mio, Laocoontare (La Guerra Delle Idee) and Pyrocentre (1980)
- Las Scillabas de Scylla, El Espejo de Cronos and El Verbo América (1981)
- Geomagnética de Danza (started in 1981), Ils Sexplose, Passo Interno di Mercurio, Labirintad and The Sign (1982)
- Morphologie de la Gaîté, Logos Men and Artificial Lucidity (1983)
- Ecran de la Mémoire and Le Dauphin de la Memoire (1984)
- L'Espace Du Point (1985)
- Mi-mosa, 24 Mai 1986, Une Pierre Qui Regagnera le Ciel and Oeramen, la Conscience est un Arbre Vetroresina (1986)
- D’Âme et d’Eve (1987)
- Être Cri (1988)
- Violetation and L’Envenement Non Identifié (1989)
- A l’Intérieur de la Rose, Omnipuissance du Rouge, Navigateur and Haiku (1990)
- Parmi les Désirs and Ma Dame (1991)
- Champ du Vide, Cosmo-now, Le Désnomeur Rénomme and Farfallacqua (1992)
- Leaving Your Grass, Vertige du Vertige, Torinox and Colomberos (1993)
- Vent d’Atomes (1994)
- Les Arpèges, L’Âme du Fond and Melodia-Melodio (1995)
- The Road to Heaven, Storming Water River and Redness of Blue (1996)
- Flowerita and Oak Flower (1997)
- Youniverso (1998)
- Blanche ou Fleur (1999)
- N’ou’s Autres (2000)
- Chaosmos (2002), Viersen sculpture collection
- Post History Chicken Flowers, La Dulce Acqua Vita and La Source du Calme (2002)

== See also ==
- Dakin Building
- Art of Chile
