= Eduardo de la Barra (writer) =

Chilean diplomat

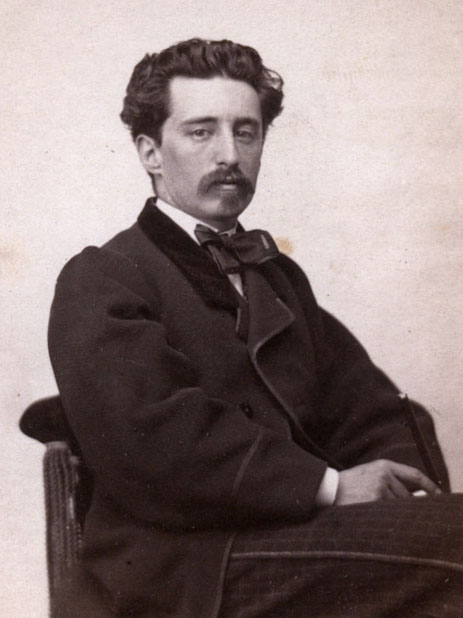
- Born: Eduardo de la Barra Lastarria; 9 February 1839; Santiago, Chile
- Died: 9 April 1900 (aged 61); Valparaíso, Chile
- Occupations: Writer, diplomat, geographer, philosopher
- Writing career
- Language: Spanish
- Notable works: Rimas chilenas (1890); Ensayos filosóficos americanos (1894); Las lenguas celtolatinas (1899)

Eduardo de la Barra (1839–1900) was a Chilean writer, diplomat and geographer. De la Barra is known for his polemics, including his opposition to what he perceived as an excessive German cultural and scientific influence in Chile. For this purpose he coined the concept of a "the German bewichment" (Spanish: el embrujamiento alemán, lit. 'the German witchcraft'). This earned him criticism as being himself a promoter of Latin culture ("romanizer").
