= Jorge Prieto Echaurren =

Chilean lawyer and politician

Ambassador of Chile to Italy
- In office 1930–1930
- President: Carlos Ibáñez del Campo

Minister of Justice and Public Instruction
- In office 15 March 1924 – 22 July 1924
- President: Arturo Alessandri
- Preceded by: Guillermo Labarca
- Succeeded by: Luis Salas Romo

Member of the Chamber of Deputies
- In office 1912–1915
- Constituency: Arauco, Lebu and Cañete
- In office 1915–1918
- Constituency: Antofagasta
- In office 1918–1921
- Constituency: Rere and Puchacay

Personal details
- Born: 20 March 1874 Santiago, Chile
- Died: 13 October 1955 (aged 81) Valparaíso, Chile
- Party: Liberal Democratic
- Spouse: Leonor Urioste
- Children: 5
- Parent(s): Alfredo Prieto Zenteno; Josefina Echaurren
- Education: University of Chile (LL.B)
- Occupation: Lawyer

Jorge Prieto Echaurren (21 March 1873 – 11 November 1953) was a Chilean lawyer, politician, diplomat and judge.

A member of the Liberal Democratic Party, he served in the Chamber of Deputies of Chile from 1912 to 1921 and briefly as Minister of Justice and Public Instruction in 1924.

== Early life and career ==
Prieto was born in Santiago on 21 March 1873, the son of politician Alfredo Prieto Zenteno and Josefina Echaurren González. He attended the Sacred Hearts School of Santiago and later studied law at the University of Chile, qualifying as a lawyer on 20 December 1898.

He married Leonor Urioste, with whom he had five children.

Prieto practised law in Santiago, specializing in criminal cases, and served as secretary of the Intendancy of Santiago.

== Political career ==
A member of the Liberal Democratic Party, Prieto was elected to the Chamber of Deputies for Arauco, Lebu and Cañete for the 1912–1915 term. He subsequently represented Antofagasta from 1915 to 1918 and Rere and Puchacay from 1918 to 1921. During his parliamentary career, he served on the Permanent Commission on Public Works and the Permanent Commission on Public Assistance and Worship.

In 1924, Prieto served as Minister of Justice and Public Instruction. He later entered the diplomatic service, serving as Chilean ambassador to Italy in 1930 and as chargé d'affaires in Rio de Janeiro, Brazil, in 1931.

Following the political upheaval of 1932, Prieto remained abroad and settled in Washington, D.C., where he worked with other lawyers. He returned to Chile in 1935 and was appointed a judge of the Santiago Court of Appeals, subsequently withdrawing from active politics.

Prieto died in Valparaíso on 11 November 1953.
