= Roberto Sánchez (Chilean politician) =

Chilean politician

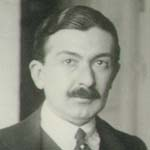

Member of the Senate
- In office 15 May 1926 – 6 June 1932
- Constituency: 4th Provincial Grouping
- In office 15 May 1924 – 11 September 1924
- Constituency: Santiago

Member of the Chamber of Deputies
- In office 15 May 1918 – 15 May 1924
- Constituency: Ovalle, Combarbalá and Illapel
- In office 15 May 1909 – 15 May 1912
- Constituency: Itata
- In office 15 May 1906 – 15 May 1909
- Constituency: La Serena, Elqui and Coquimbo

Personal details
- Born: 18 November 1879 Santiago, Chile
- Died: 23 August 1947 Santiago, Chile
- Party: Liberal Democratic Party
- Spouse: Ignacia Zañartu Iñiguez
- Education: University of Chile
- Occupation: Lawyer, diplomat, politician

Roberto Sánchez García de la Huerta (18 November 1879 – 23 August 1947) was a Chilean lawyer, diplomat and politician. A member of the Liberal Democratic Party, he served as deputy and later as senator.

== Biography ==
He was born in Santiago on 18 November 1879, to Evaristo Sánchez Fontecilla and Luisa García de la Huerta Pérez. He was a nephew of Mariano Sánchez Fontecilla, a Chilean diplomat and Government Minister, and was the cousin of Renato Sánchez García de la Huerta.

He married Ignacia Zañartu Iñiguez, with whom he had a son, Roberto. After becoming a widower he married Ana Sánchez Errázuriz.

He studied at the San Ignacio School between 1888 and 1896 and went on to graduate with a law degree from the University of Chile on 22 December 1902.

He later served as adviser to the State Railways and as Chilean ambassador to Peru at the time the treaties of fraternity between the two countries were ratified.

== Political career ==
Sánchez belonged to the Liberal Democratic Party, in which he served as both director and president on several occasions.

He first entered the National Congress as deputy for La Serena, Elqui and Coquimbo for the 1906–1909 legislative period. During this term he served as second vice-president of the Chamber of Deputies on 7 November 1907 and as first vice-president on 19 November 1908. He also served as substitute member of the Standing Committee on Public Instruction.

He was later elected deputy for Itata for the 1909–1912 legislative period, assuming office on 7 July 1911 to replace Emiliano Figueroa, who had been appointed minister in Spain. On 30 April 1912 he was elected president of the Chamber of Deputies.

He returned to the Chamber as deputy for Ovalle, Combarbalá and Illapel for the 1918–1921 legislative period. During this term he served on the Standing Committee on Foreign Affairs and Colonisation and on the Conservative Commission during the parliamentary recesses of 1918–1919 and 1919–1920.

He was re-elected deputy for the same constituency for the 1921–1924 legislative period. During this term he served on the Standing Committees on Elections and Internal Police and on the Conservative Commission during the 1923–1924 recess.

He was elected senator for Santiago for the 1924–1930 period and served on the Standing Committee on Government and Elections. In 1922, the National Council of Women worked with Sanchez and Jose Maza to try and pass a law surrounding Women's suffrage in Chile, though it did not pass. The National Congress was dissolved on 11 September 1924 by decree of the governing military junta.

He was again elected senator for the 4th Provincial Grouping for the 1926–1930 period, serving as member and chairman of the Standing Committee on Foreign Affairs and as substitute member of the Standing Committees on Government and on Public Education.

He was re-elected senator for the same provincial grouping for the 1930–1938 period. During this term he served on the Standing Committee on Foreign Affairs, which he chaired, and on the Standing Committee on Army and Navy.

The 1932 socialist coup d'état led to the dissolution of the National Congress on 6 June 1932.

== Ministerial career ==
He held several ministerial posts during the early twentieth century. He served as Minister of Finance from 11 January to 15 August 1911 under the presidency of Ramón Barros Luco, during which the port works of Valparaíso and San Antonio were initiated. Additionally, with the help of SONAMI, Sanchez introduced a tax on borax production.

He was appointed Minister of Justice and Public Instruction by President Juan Luis Sanfuentes, serving from 8 January to 1 July 1916. He later returned to the same ministry from 3 November 1921 to 22 March 1922 during the presidency of Arturo Alessandri. Alessandri subsequently appointed him Minister of War and Navy from 5 April to 29 August 1922. Finally, he served as Minister of Foreign Affairs, Worship and Colonisation from 1 to 20 February 1924.

As Minister of Justice in 1929, Sánchez created the prison Gendarmerie.
