= Luis Orrego Luco =

Chilean politician and writer (1866–1948)

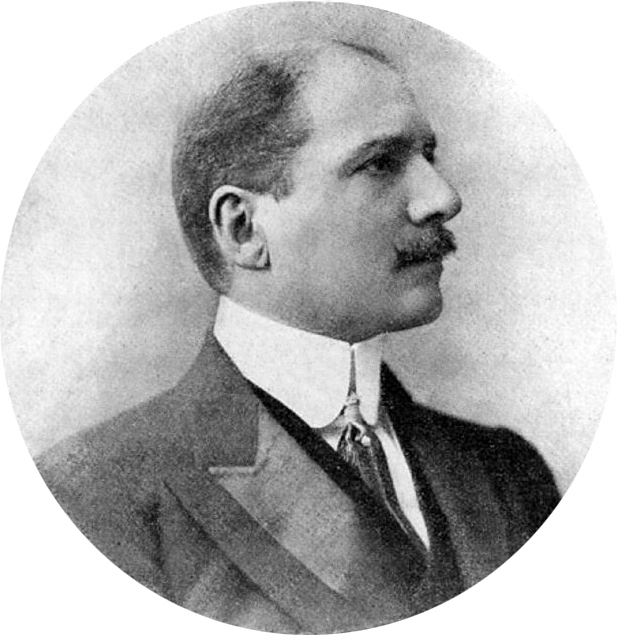

Minister of Justice and Public Instruction
- In office 25 November 1918 – 3 May 1919
- President: Juan Luis Sanfuentes

Member of the Chamber of Deputies
- In office 1918–1921
- Constituency: Osorno

Personal details
- Born: 21 May 1866 Santiago, Chile
- Died: 1948 Santiago, Chile
- Party: Radical Party
- Spouse: María Vicuña
- Children: 4
- Education: University of Chile
- Occupation: Lawyer, writer, diplomat and politician

Luis Orrego Luco (21 May 1866 – 1948) was a Chilean lawyer, novelist, diplomat and politician who served as a member of the Chamber of Deputies of Chile and as Minister of Justice and Public Instruction under President Juan Luis Sanfuentes.

He was also active in Chile's diplomatic service and was a member of the Chilean Academy of Language.

== Early life and career ==
Orrego Luco was born in Santiago on 21 May 1866, the son of Antonio Orrego Garmendia and Rosalía Luco León de la Barra. He received part of his education abroad, attending the Breideistain Institute in Switzerland and the English College of Radford, before continuing his studies at the Instituto Nacional in Santiago. He subsequently studied law at the University of Chile and qualified as a lawyer on 18 August 1887.

He married María Vicuña Subercaseaux in Santiago on 18 June 1896. The couple had four sons: Benjamín, Eugenio, Fernando and Germán.

Alongside his legal career, Orrego Luco developed a significant interest in literature and journalism. He contributed to newspapers and magazines from an early stage of his career and worked as an editor of La Época in 1885. He later founded the newspaper La Mañana in 1909 and also edited the magazine Selecta. As a novelist, he was associated with the Chilean literary movement known as the Generation of 1900.

== Political career ==
Orrego Luco was a member of the Radical Party. During the 1891 Chilean Civil War, he joined the revolutionary forces and commanded the Chañaral Regiment in the battles of Concón and Placilla.

His diplomatic career began in the following years. In 1893, he served as Chilean consul and chargé d'affaires in Madrid, and subsequently became secretary of the Chilean legation in Brazil. He later served as intendant of Colchagua Province from 31 January to 15 September 1894.

Orrego Luco was elected to the Chamber of Deputies as representative for Osorno for the 1918–1921 legislative term. During his time in Congress, he sat on the permanent committee for foreign relations and colonization and served as a substitute member of the permanent committee on government.

President Juan Luis Sanfuentes appointed him Minister of Justice and Public Instruction on 25 November 1918. He remained in office until 3 May 1919.

After his parliamentary service, Orrego Luco continued his diplomatic career. He represented Chile as minister plenipotentiary and envoy extraordinary in Colombia and Uruguay and also participated in several extraordinary diplomatic missions. He withdrew from political and diplomatic life in 1931.

== Literary career ==
In addition to his political and diplomatic activities, Orrego Luco maintained a substantial literary career. He published twelve novels as well as five volumes dealing with international affairs. His work placed him among the writers associated with Chile's Generation of 1900.

Orrego Luco was a member of the Chilean Academy of Language and belonged to the Club de la Unión. He died in Santiago in 1948.

== Published works ==
Among his novels include

- "A New Idyll" (1892), "Santiago" (1900)
- "On Family, Memories of Old Time" (1912)
- "Through the Storm: Memories of Old Time: The Revolution 1891 "(1914)
- "Stem Wounded: Scenes of Life in Chile "(1929)
- "Playa Negra: Scenes of Life in Chile "(1947).
