= 1925 Chilean presidential election =

- 22 October 1925
- Registered: 302,142
- Turnout: 86.35%
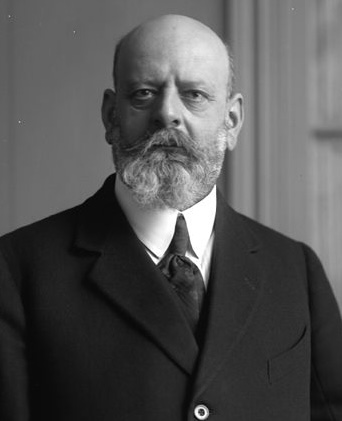

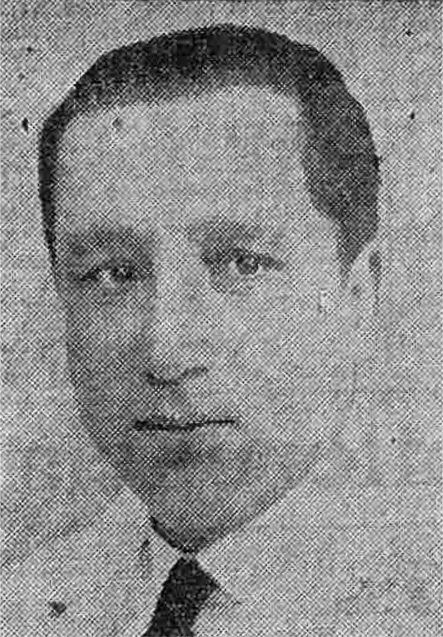
Candidate	Emiliano Figueroa	José Santos Salas
Party	Independent	USRACh
Popular vote	186,187	74,091
Percentage	71.53%	28.47%
President before election
Luis Barros Borgoño (acting)
Liberal Party
Elected President
Emiliano Figueroa
Liberal Democratic

Presidential elections were held in Chile on 22 October 1925. They were the first direct presidential elections in the country's history and the first to be held under the new 1925 constitution. The result was a victory for Emiliano Figueroa, who received 72% of the vote.

== Electoral system ==
The election was held using the absolute majority system, under which a candidate had to receive over 50% of the popular vote to be elected. If no candidate received over 50% of the vote, a joint session of the National Congress would vote on the two candidates that received the most votes.

== Campaign ==
A member of the Liberal Democratic Party, Figueroa ran as an independent, and was also supported by the Conservative Party, the Radical Party, the United Liberal Party, the Doctrinal Liberal Party, and Democrat Party, the Unionist Liberal Party and the Aliancista Liberal Democratic Party.

== Results ==
Candidate	Party	Votes	%
Emiliano Figueroa	Independent	186,187	71.53
José Santos Salas	Social-Republican Union of the Wage Earners of Chile	74,091	28.47
Total		260,278	100.00
Valid votes		260,278	99.76
Invalid/blank votes		617	0.24
Total votes		260,895	100.00
Registered voters/turnout		302,142	86.35
Source: Chilean Elections Database
