= Francisco Cumplido =

Chilean politician (1930–2022)

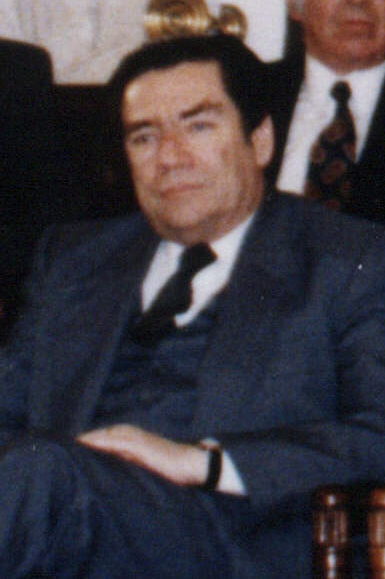

Minister of Justice
- In office 11 March 1990 – 11 March 1994
- President: Patricio Aylwin
- Preceded by: Hugo Rosende
- Succeeded by: Soledad Alvear

Personal details
- Born: 23 October 1930 Santiago, Chile
- Died: 16 July 2022 (aged 91) Santiago, Chile
- Party: Christian Democratic Party (1958–2022)
- Spouse: Alicia García
- Parents: Simón Cumplido (father); Elvira Cereceda (mother)
- Education: University of Chile (LL.B)
- Profession: Lawyer

Francisco Guillermo Cumplido Cereceda (23 October 1930 – 16 July 2022) was a Chilean politician who served as Minister of Justice under Patricio Aylwin's government (1990–1994).

From his work in the State, his role in the establishment and work of the National Commission for Truth and Reconciliation stood out. The commission sought to clarify the truth regarding crimes committed during the military dictatorship of General Augusto Pinochet.

== Family and education ==
He completed his primary education at the Salvador Sanfuentes School and at the Miguel Luis Amunátegui High School, and continued his secondary education at the Instituto Nacional General José Miguel Carrera, all of the aforementioned institutions located in Santiago. He later pursued higher education in law at the University of Chile.

He married Alicia Antonieta García Valdés; the marriage produced no children.

== Academic career ==
Between 1969 and 1972, he served as director of the Institute of Political and Administrative Sciences of the University of Chile, and from 1970 to 1978 he worked as a professor at the Latin American Faculty of Social Sciences (FLACSO). He also served as a professor of political institutions and constitutional law at the Diego Portales University, and as rector of the Miguel de Cervantes University.

He also worked as a legal adviser to the Food and Agriculture Organization (FAO), and as an adviser on constitutional reform projects during the governments of Presidents Jorge Alessandri (1958–1964) and Eduardo Frei Montalva (1964–1970).

== Political career ==
He joined the Christian Democratic Party (PDC) in 1958, and served as president of the party’s National Disciplinary Court for two terms. During the presidency of fellow Christian Democrat Eduardo Frei Montalva, he was appointed Director General of Lands at the Ministry of Lands and Colonization.

On 11 March 1990, he assumed office as Minister of Justice in the government of President Patricio Aylwin, serving until the end of the administration on 11 March 1994. During this period, the so-called Rettig Report was presented to public opinion, with the aim of clarifying human rights violations committed between 11 September 1973 and 11 March 1990, during the military dictatorship of General Augusto Pinochet. Among the milestones of his tenure were the so-called Cumplido Laws, which included the “Law on Terrorist Conduct”, adapted to international treaties, the repeal of the death penalty (finally abolished during the government of President Ricardo Lagos in 2001), and the strengthening of individuals’ rights within the criminal process.

Subsequently, as a former minister of State, he conducted several studies in law for the Ministry of the General Secretariat of the Presidency (Segpres) and the Ministry of Finance. In 2004, together with his colleague Juan José Romero, an academic at the Pontifical Catholic University of Chile, he was recruited by the National Mining Society of Chile (Sonami) to prepare a legal report opposing the first royalty bill. The document, entitled Constitutional limits to State intervention through the establishment of a mining royalty, stated categorically that said royalty “is a tax and would suffer from defects of unconstitutionality”.

He died in San Antonio on 16 July 2022, at the age of 91. His remains were laid out in the locality of Cuncumén, within that municipality.
