= Luis Ayala Poblete =

Chilean politician

Luis Ayala

Member of the Chamber of Deputies of Chile
- In office 15 May 1926 – 15 May 1930
- Constituency: 7th Departamental Grouping, Santiago

Personal details
- Party: Social-Republican Union of the Wage Earners of Chile; Communist

Luis Ayala Poblete was a Chilean trade union leader and politician who served in the Chamber of Deputies of Chile from 1926 to 1930.

== Career ==
Ayala was a member of a tramway labour union in Santiago. He presided over the Road Workers' Union Convention in 1924, and prepared for the foundation of the Chilean Wage Earners' Party at this event. This organization was created as the Social-Republican Union of the Wage Earners of Chile (USRACH) in 1926, with Ayala as one of its founding members.

Ayala was elected to the Chamber of Deputies of Chile in the 1925 election representing the 7th Departmental District. He later joined the Communist Party of Chile.

President Carlos Ibáñez del Campo deported Ayala in 1927 in response to him accusing the Minister of the Interior of ordering the imposing of citizens. Ayala returned to Chile in October.

== Works cited ==
- "Luis Ayala Poblete". Library of the National Congress of Chile. Archived from the original on 17 October 2026.
