= Chilean Historical and Military Museum =

- Museo Histórico y Militar de Chile
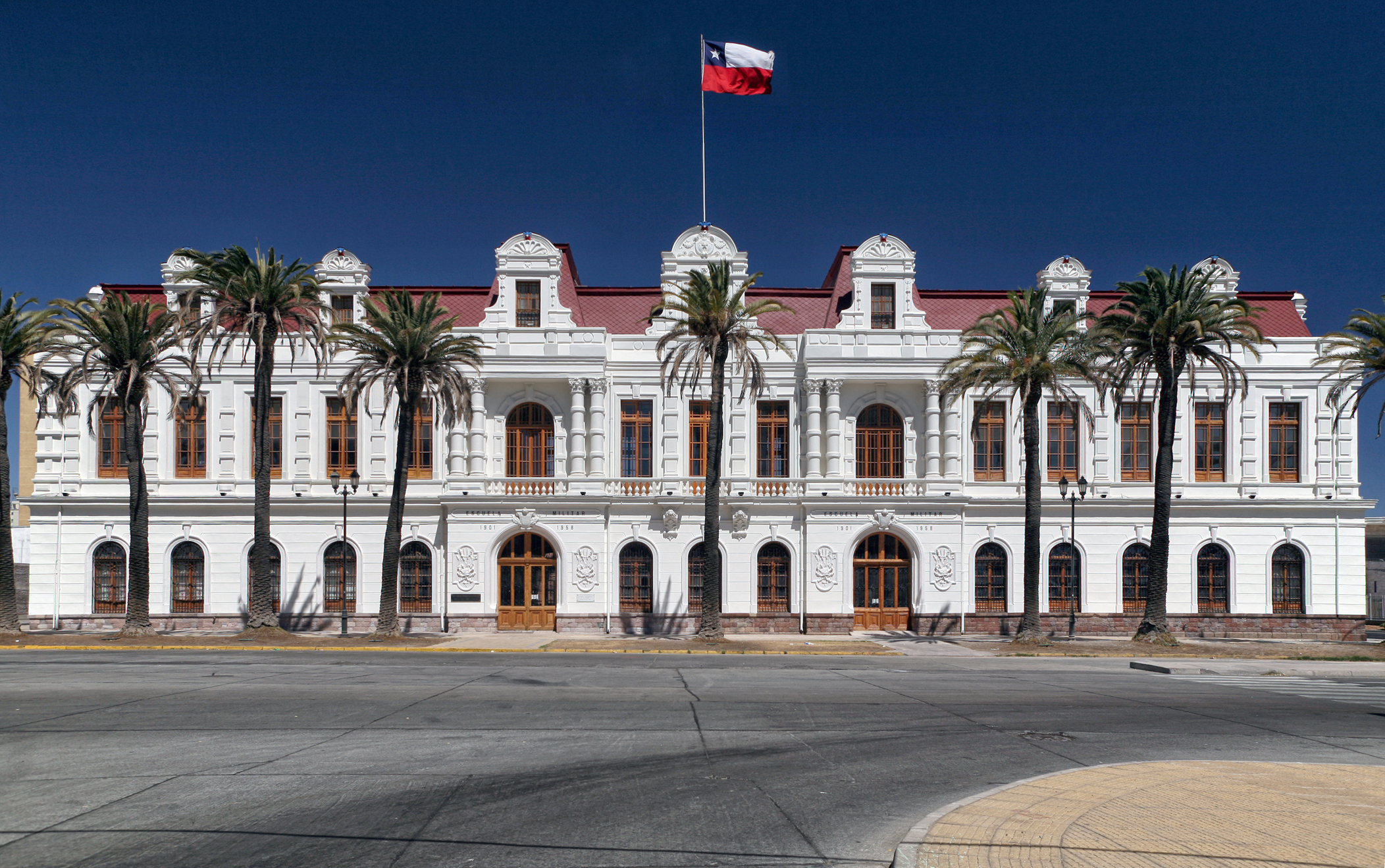
- The Alcázar building, home of the museum.

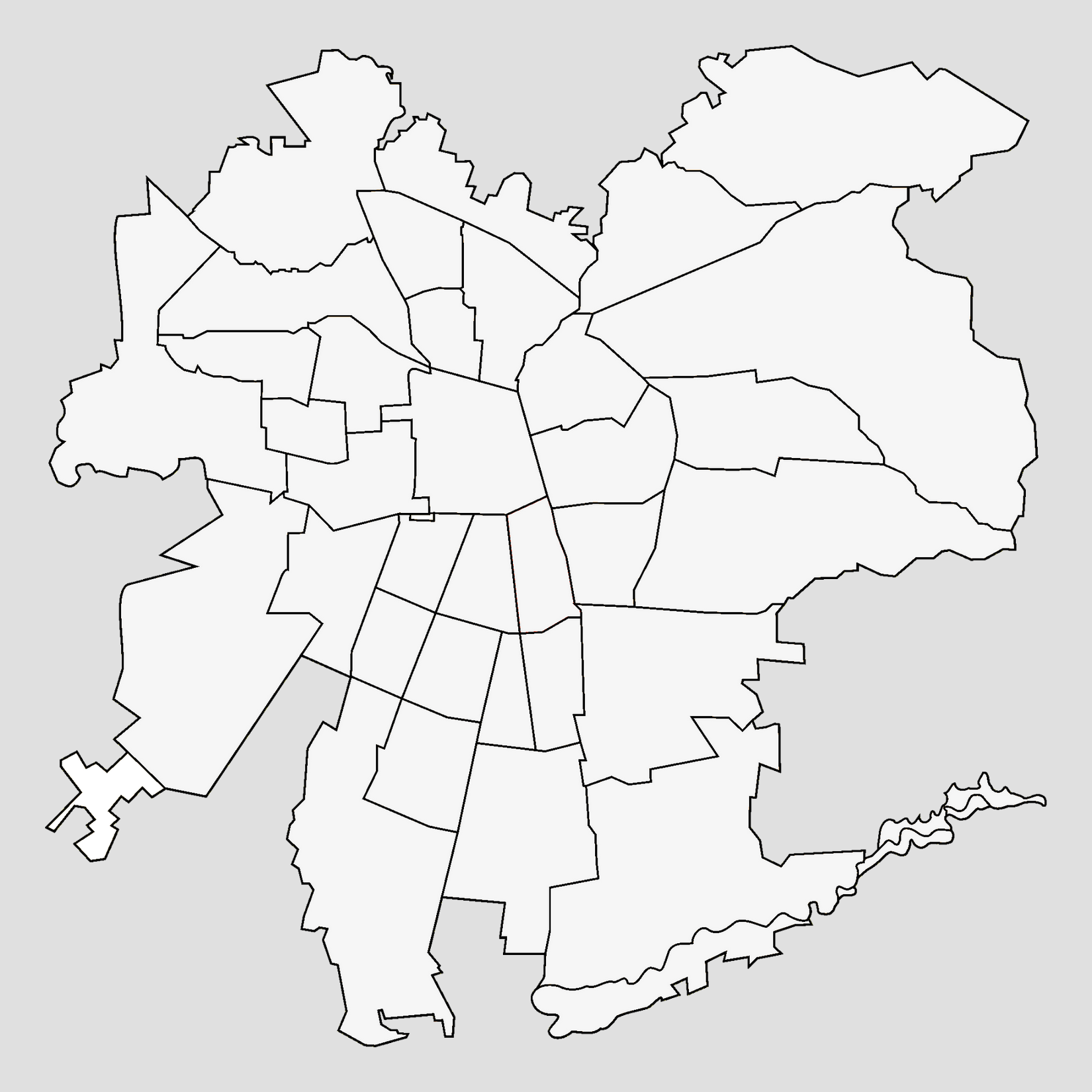
- Location within Chile Santiago
- Established: 1895
- Location: Santiago, Chile
- Coordinates: 33.4572°S 70.6562°W
- Type: Military history museum
- Key holdings: Weapons, uniforms, military documents, artifacts
- Collections: Chilean military history, 16th–20th century
- Collection size: 20 exhibition rooms
- Visitors: Free admission. (Note: The museum is closed on Mondays.)
- Owner: Chilean Army
- Public transit access: Near Toesca and Parque O’Higgins metro stations
- Parking: Available nearby
- Website: www.mhm.cl

The Chilean Historical and Military Museum (Spanish: Museo Histórico y Militar de Chile, MHM) is a national museum in Santiago, Chile, dedicated to the preservation and exhibition of the country’s military history. Established in 1895 and administered by the Chilean Army, since 1997 the museum has been housed in the 19th-century Alcázar building, a former military academy and National Historic Monument. Its collections include weapons, uniforms, documents, and multimedia displays that trace Chile's history from the pre-Hispanic era to the 20th century. Admission is free to the public.

== History ==
After several attempts to establish a military museum following Chile's victory in the War of the Pacific, President Jorge Montt inaugurated the Military Museum of Chile on 21 May 1895. The initial exhibition was limited to a small display of weapons housed in the army's workshops. In 1911, with the creation of the National Historical Museum across from Santiago's Plaza de Armas, the collection was transferred there due to space limitations that prevented it from remaining in its original location.

On 25 November 1997, the museum was inaugurated at its current location by Augusto Pinochet, then Commander-in-Chief of the Chilean Army, following a decision by the military high command to house it in the Alcázar building. The building had served as a military academy from 1901 to 1958 and as the headquarters of the Army's non-commissioned officers' school from 1958 to 1995. On 25 October 1990, it was declared a National Historic Monument in recognition of its significance to Chile's military heritage.

== Collection ==
The museum's collection is displayed across twenty rooms throughout the building. Each room focuses on a different theme presented in chronological order, spanning from the arrival of the Inca in Chile and the period of the Spanish conquest of Chile, to the country's involvement in the Cold War and its territorial claims in Antarctica.
