= José Maza Fernández =

Chilean politician (1889–1964)

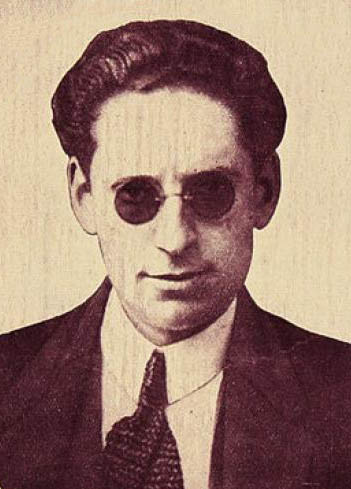
- Maza in 1925

President of the United Nations General Assembly
- In office 20 September 1955 – 20 December 1955
- Preceded by: Eelco van Kleffens
- Succeeded by: Rudecindo Ortega

Minister of Justice
- In office 29 January 1925 – 1 September 1925
- President: Government Junta; Arturo Alessandri
- Preceded by: José Bernales Navarro
- Succeeded by: Oscar Fenner

Minister of the Interior
- In office 1 February 1924 – 20 February 1924
- President: Arturo Alessandri
- Preceded by: Pedro Aguirre Cerda
- Succeeded by: Cornelio Saavedra Montt

Personal details
- Born: 13 October 1889 Los Ángeles, Chile
- Died: 6 May 1964 (aged 74) Santiago, Chile
- Spouse: Raquel Lyon Vial
- Children: José Maza Lyon
- Parent(s): Armando de la Maza; Zoila Fernández
- Education: University of Chile (LL.B)
- Profession: Lawyer

José Maza Fernández (13 October 1889 – 6 May 1964) was a politician, lawyer and diplomat from Chile. He served as the President of the United Nations General Assembly during its tenth session from 1954 to 1955.

He was one of the founding members of the Caja de Crédito Hipotecario, which was a predecessor of the Banco del Estado de Chile.

== Early life ==
José was born to Armando de la Maza Ramos and Zoila Rosa Fernández Anguita in Los Ángeles, Chile.

He studied at the Liceo de Aplicación in Santiago and graduated as a lawyer from the University of Chile in 1913. He worked as a clerk at the Chilean War Ministry, before turning his attention towards student politics. He married Raquel Lyon Vial and they had a son, José.

== Political career ==
He served as an important member in the Liberal Party, rising to become its president. He also served in the ministry of Arturo Alessandri as the Home minister in 1924, Minister of Justice and Public Instruction in 1925, besides also holding the position of the Minister of Foreign Affairs and Religion occasionally.

He was twice President of the Senate, in 1936 and 1937. He was also president of the Senate's Committee on Foreign Relations from 1937 until 1953. In 1949 he drafted a law which gave women political rights and was later incorporated into the Chilean Constitution.

=== Diplomatic career ===
He also served as the Chilean Ambassador to Uruguay, Brazil, Haiti, Panama, the Dominican Republic, and Peru at different periods of his diplomatic career. He was also Chile's delegate in the United Nations Conference on International Organization in 1945. He subsequently served as the Chilean representative at the United Nations, before becoming the President of the United Nations General Assembly in 1954. He was subsequently the Chilean Ambassador to Argentina from 1957 to 1958.
