= Luis Silva Irarrázaval =

Chilean politician (born 1978)

Luis Silva
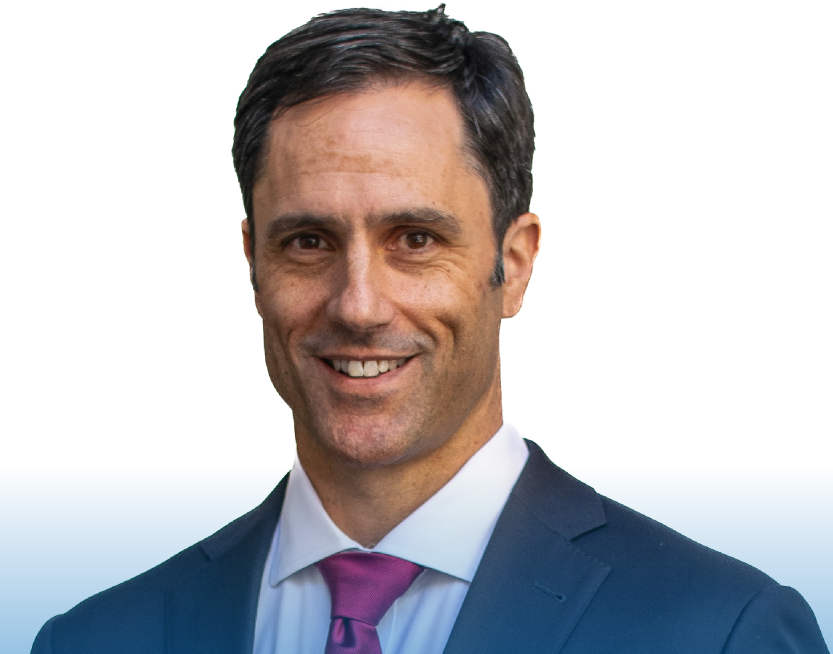
- Official portrait, 2026

Undersecretary of Justice
- In office 11 March 2026 – 30 October 2026
- President: José Antonio Kast
- Preceded by: Ernesto Muñoz Lamartine

Member of the Constitutional Council
- In office 7 June 2023 – 7 November 2023
- Constituency: Santiago Metropolitan Region

Personal details
- Born: 24 March 1978 (age 48) Santiago, Chile
- Party: Republican
- Parent(s): Luis A. Silva Valdés; Soledad Irarrázaval
- Education: Pontifical Catholic University of Chile; University of the Andes
- Occupation: Politician
- Profession: Lawyer

Luis Alejandro Silva Irarrázaval (born 24 March 1978) is a Chilean lawyer and conservative politician who served as Undersecretary of Justice from 11 March 2026 to 30 October 2026, during José Antonio Kast's presidency. Currently he is one of the six vice-presidents of Chile's Republican Party.

In 2023, Silva emerged as the politician with the most votes to draft a new constitution in his country, serving in the Constitutional Council. However, that constitutional project was rejected, being the second to be rejected in a row after the left-leaning Constitutional Convention. During the process, he has declared himself an admirer of the Augusto Pinochet dictatorship reforms. In 2024, he returned to teaching at the university, becoming a professor at San Sebastián University (USS).

== Biography ==
=== Early life and family ===
Silva was born on 24 March 1978 in Santiago, Chile. He was raised in a conservative family close to the political ideas of Jaime Guzmán, a lawyer, academic, and politician who drafted the 1980 Chilean Constitution. He is the eldest son of lawyer Luis Alejandro Silva Valdés and journalist Soledad Irarrázaval Alfonso. Among his seven siblings is filmmaker Sebastián Silva, with whom he hasn't maintained a relationship since 2021 due to political differences, but Luis assures that the affection and admiration he feels for him is very great and remains intact. His younger brother Juan Andrés, a sociologist, died on 15 May 2026 at the age of 38.

He attended Verbo Divino school.

=== Scholar background ===
In late-90s, Silva joined Pontifical Catholic University of Chile School of Law. There he was president of the student board of his career, and officially graduated in 2004.

Fiver years later, in 2009, he obtained his Ph.D. in laws at the University of the Andes. In that way, Silva has taught law at that university for many years. Similarly, he held the position of Vice-Rector for Research and Postgraduate Studies in the same scholarly institution.

From 2013 to 2014, he was part of the James Madison Program at Princeton University, where he was the William E. Simon Visiting Fellow in Religion and Public Life.

== Political career ==
In 2018, Silva met José Antonio Kast in the conservative think-tank, Jaime Guzmán Foundation (FJG). In the FJG, he has been an advisor and has given lectures on law.

In 2021, he ran for a seat in the Constitutional Convention and then for the Chamber of Deputies. In both elections, Silva failed to be elected. After that, Silva joined Republican Party in October 2022.

That year (2022) he dedicated himself to being an influencer against the Constitutional Convention and Gabriel Boric's government, which served as an electoral strategy to obtain a seat in the Constitutional Council.

In 2026 from 11 March to 30 October, he served as Undersecretary of Justice during José Antonio Kast's presidency.
