= Pablo Echaurren =

Italian painter

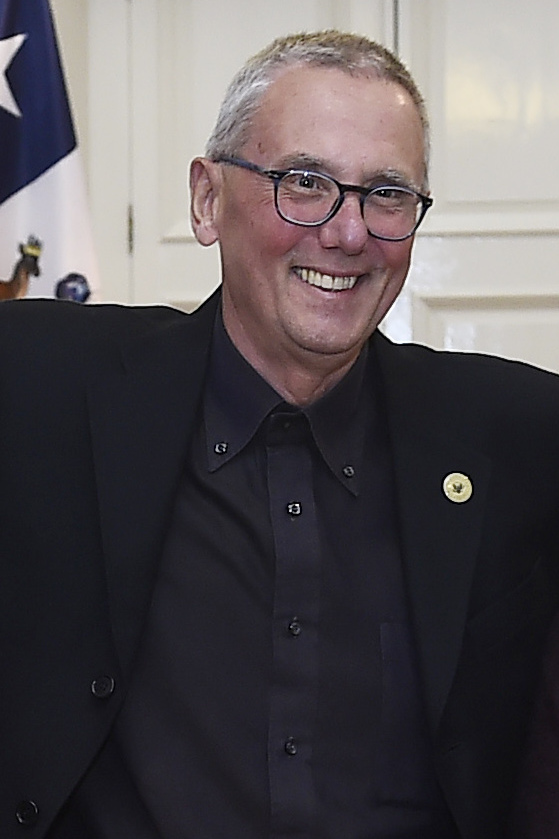
- Born: January 22, 1951 (age 75); Rome, Italy

Pablo Echaurren (born 22 January 1951) is an Italian painter, comics artist and writer.

== Biography ==
He is the son of Chilean surrealist painter Roberto Matta and Italian actress Angela Faranda. His surname stems from a clerical error in the civil registry office, which was eventually corrected, but Echaurren continued to use the name professionally. Gianfranco Baruchello was Echaurren’s art mentor: he introduced him to Arturo Schwarz, who became his first manager.

Since the early 1970s, Echaurren has exhibited his work in Italy and abroad. In the 1980s and 1990s he produced numerous avant-garde comics such as Caffeina d’Europa (a work devoted to Marinetti’s life, and one of his first graphic novels), Majakovskij, Nivola vola, Futurismo contro, Vita disegnata di Dino Campana, Evola in Dada, Vita di Pound, Dada con le zecche.

His style is influenced by Dada. He combines “high” and “low” culture as well as art and crafts, expressing himself via different media including painting, ceramics, illustration, comics, writing, video, etc. He aims to create work outside the expected cultural hierarchies. In the 1970s he designed covers for several books, including Porci con le ali (Pigs with Wings), many of which were published by the far-left publishing house Savelli. In 1977, he and others created Oask?!, the first fanzine by the ‘Metropolitan Indians’ (Indiani Metropolitani), soon followed by other fanzines related to the ‘Movement of 1977’ (Il movimento del ‘77). He collaborated, as an artist and a writer, with Lotta Continua (a political organization) and with magazines such as Linus, Frigidaire, Tango, Comic Art, Alter Alter, Zut, and Carta. He is also the author of numerous essays, polemical pamphlets and novels.

An anthological exhibition of his work (from the 1970s until today) was held at the Chiostro del Bramante in Rome (2004), while his most recent production was displayed in a solo exhibition at the Auditorium Parco della Musica in Rome (2006) and in the Pablo a Siena exhibition at the Magazzini del Sale (2008). In 2009, the MIAAO (Museo Internazionale di Arti Applicate Oggi) in Turin celebrated the 100th anniversary of Futurism with an exhibition focusing on his work. Echaurren is also a lover of electric basses. In 2009, he exhibited his collection of vintage instruments, along with several of his paintings inspired by them, at the Auditorium Parco della Musica in the exhibition "The Invention of the Bass" (L'invenzione del basso).

In 2010, as an acknowledgment of Echaurren’s forty-year career, the Fondazione Roma Museo organized the anthological exhibition "Crhomo Sapiens" at Palazzo Cipolla (previously, Museo del Corso). In the same year, together with his wife Claudia Salaris, the artist founded the Fondazione Echaurren Salaris. In 2011, the Macro in Rome presented the cycle "Baroque'n'Roll", a series of ceramic kiosks dedicated to his passion for the electric bass, and the Mar (Ravenna), organized the exhibition "Lasciare il segno" (‘Leave a mark’) featuring works produced since early 1969.

In 2010 he created the Foundation Echaurren Salaris with his wife, Claudia Salaris, a historian of avant-garde movements.

In 2014 the Beinecke Library (Yale University, USA) acquired an extensive collection of Pablo Echaurren's writings and drawings related to his participation in the countercultural movement of the 1970s.

In 2015 The Galleria nazionale d’arte moderna e contemporanea hosted a large solo show (curated by Angelandreina Rorro) by Echaurren titled "Contropittura", which analysed the sociopolitical aspects of his work.

In 2016, Chile paid tribute to him for the first time with a retrospective exhibition at the Museo Nacional de Bellas Artes in Santiago (curated by Inès Ortega-Màrquez) entitled Make Art Not Money.

In 2017 various shows commemorated forty years from the Movement of 1977: 1) "Du champ magnétique" at Scala Contarini del Bovolo in Venice exhibited Echaurren’s drawings that reinterpreted Marcel Duchamp’s work; 2) the Museo di Roma in Trastevere organized an exhibition of Echaurren’s drawings from 1977 alongside Tano D'Amico’s photographs; 3) the Palazzo Platamone (Catania) hosted the exhibition "Soft Wall", framing Echaurren's alternative/underground production and his connection to the language of Street Art.

In 2019, Mart (Rovereto) hosted a solo show.

In 2020, the Bibliotheca Hertziana (Max Planck Institut, Rome) digitally acquired a large section of the Echaurren Salaris' archive pertaining to the 1970s (fanzines, posters, drawings, paintings) and is now accessible to the public.

== Exhibitions ==
Echaurren’s works are currently in the permanent collection of several museums, including The National Gallery in Rome, the MAXXI, the MACRO, the MIC (Faenza), the Mart (Rovereto), and the Museum of the Twentieth Century in Milan.

Since 2000, his work has been shown in the following exhibitions:

- Pablo Echaurren. Dagli anni settanta a oggi (Chiostro del Bramante, Rome 2004)
- Al ritmo dei Ramones (Auditorium Parco della musica, Rome 2006)
- Pablo Echaurren a Siena (Magazzini del Sale, Siena 2008)
- L’invenzione del basso (Auditorium Parco della musica, Rome 2009)
- Crhomo Sapiens (Museo della Fondazione Roma, Palazzo Cipolla, 2010–11)
- Lasciare il segno (MAR, Ravenna 2011)
- Baroque’n’Roll (MACRO, Rome 2011)
- Matta: Roberto Sebastian Matta, Gordon Matta-Clark, Pablo Echaurren (Fondazione Querini Stampalia, Venice 2013).
- Iconoclast (Estorick Collection of Modern Italian Art, London 2014)
- Contropittura (Galleria nazionale d’arte moderna e contemporanea, Rome 2015).
- Make Art not Money (Museo Nacional de Bellas Artes, Santiago de Chile 2016)
- Du champ magnétique (Scala Contarini del Bovolo, Venice 2017)
- ’77 - Tano D’Amico and Pablo Echaurren (Museo di Roma in Trastevere, Rome 2017-2018)
- Soft Wall (Palazzo della Cultura, Catania 2017-18)
- Arte-Azione, Pablo Echaurren and Italian Counterculture in the 70s. Casa Italiana Zerilli-Marimo’, New York University, New York 14sept 24oct 2025 a cura di Jacopo Galimberti e Ara H.Merjian.

== Selection of publications ==
- Matta. Roberto Sebastian Matta. Gordon Matta Clark. Pablo Echaurren. Texts by Danilo Eccher, Franco Calarota, Jessamyn Fiore, Claudia Gioia. Cinisello Balsamo (Milan), Silvana Editoriale, 2013.
- Pablo Echaurren. Iconoclast. Text by Sandro Parmiggiani. Cinisello Balsamo (Milan), Silvana Editoriale, 2014.
- Pablo Echaurren. Contropittura. Texts by Kevin Repp, Angelandreina Rorro, Claudia Salaris, Arturo Schwarz with a letter by Gianfranco Baruchello. Cinisello Balsamo (Milan), Silvana Editoriale, 2015.
- Pablo Echaurren. Make Art not Money. Texts by Inés Ortega-Marquez, Arturo Schwarz, Angelandreina Rorro, Claudia Salaris. Santiago (Chile), Editores Impresores Ograma, 2016.
- Raffaella Perna, Pablo Echaurren: il movimento del ’77 e gli indiani metropolitani. Milan. Postmedia books, 2016.
- Pablo Echaurren. Du champ magnétique. Works 1977-2017. Texts by Raffaella Perna, Kevin Repp, Claudia Salaris. Cinisello Balsamo (Milan), Silvana Editoriale, 2017.
- Marcel Duchamp Fountain. An Homage. Texts by Francis Naumann, Bradley Bailey. New York City, Francis Naumann Fine Art, LLC., 2017.
- Dwelling Dadaistically. Text by Mary Ann Caws in Oysters - East Hampton Architecture Review, pp. 2–3, New York, Architectural Body Research Foundation Inc., Summer 2018.
- Mary Ann Caws, Snail Time. Milan, Postmedia Books, 2018.
- Pablo Echaurren, Duchamp politique (English version), Milan. Postmedia books, 2020.
- Jacopo Galimberti, Hopeful Monsters. Pablo Echaurren e i mostri del movimento del ’77. Milan. Postmedia books, 2020.
- Martina Caruso, Jacopo Galimberti, Raffaella Perna, ed., Pablo Echaurren Art For the Many, Series Studi della Bibliotheca Hertziana, Milan, Silvana, 2025. ISBN 9788836660070
