= Enrique Mac Iver =

Chilean lawyer and politician

Enrique Mac Iver Rodríguez
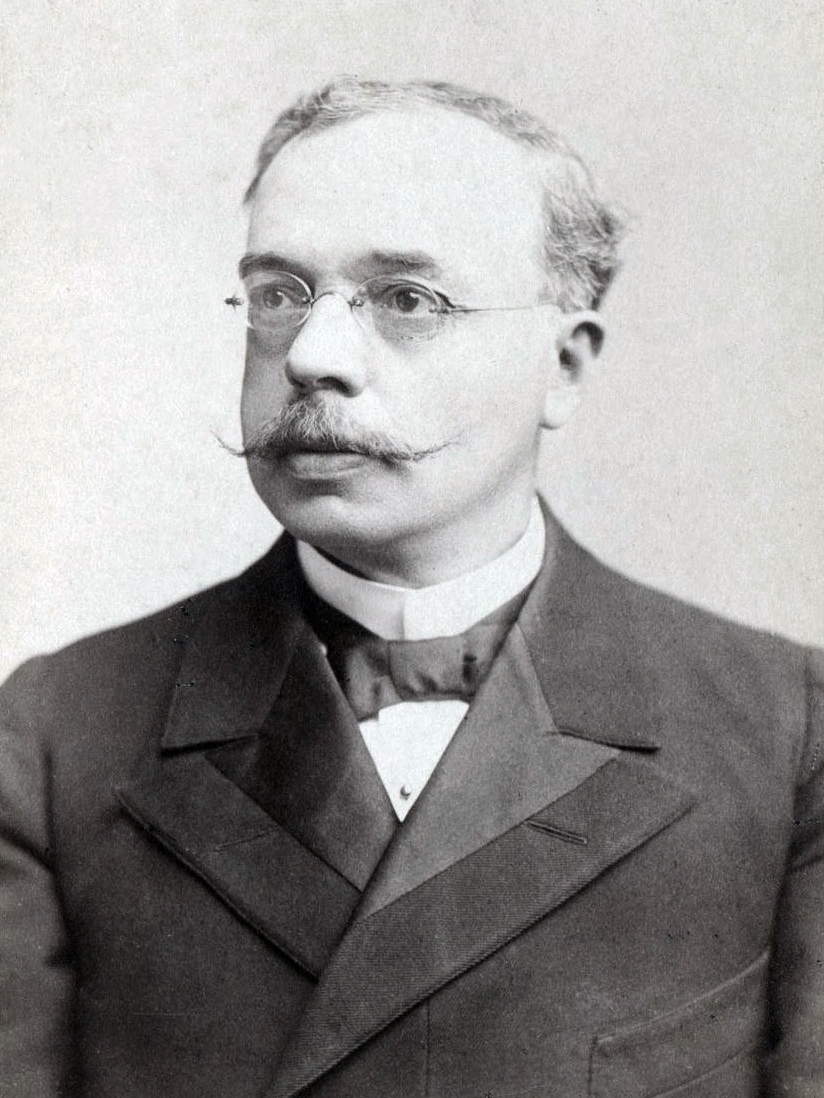

Senator of Chile

Personal details
- Born: 15 July 1844 Constitución, Maule Region, Chile
- Died: 21 August 1922 (aged 78) Santiago, Chile
- Party: Radical Party
- Profession: Lawyer

Enrique Mac Iver Rodríguez (15 July 1844 – 21 August 1922) was a Chilean lawyer and politician. He participated in the 1891 Chilean Civil War on the side of the victorious Congressist faction doing himself the first draft for the deposition of president José Manuel Balmaceda. In 1898, he represented Chile in the Puna de Atacama dispute.

== Political Career ==
Mac Iver became one of the leading figures of the Radical Party of Chile and played a significant role in shaping its political ideology. He was first elected to the Chamber of Deputies in 1876 and remained a member of the lower house for nine consecutive terms, serving until 1900. That year, he was elected to the Senate, where he continued his parliamentary career until his death in 1922. Throughout his time in Congress, he represented several constituencies, including Constitución, Talca, Santiago, and Atacama.

== Chilean Civil War of 1891 ==
During the 1891 Chilean Civil War, Mac Iver supported the Congressist movement in opposition to President José Manuel Balmaceda. After leaving Chile to avoid arrest, he stayed in Buenos Aires before joining the Congressional Junta in Iquique. He drafted the declaration calling for Balmaceda's removal from office, which became one of the most notable political documents of the conflict. Following the Congressist victory, he held several cabinet positions under President Jorge Montt, serving as Minister of Finance from 1892 to 1893 and again in 1895, and as Minister of the Interior in 1894.
