= José Santos Salas =

Chilean physician and politician

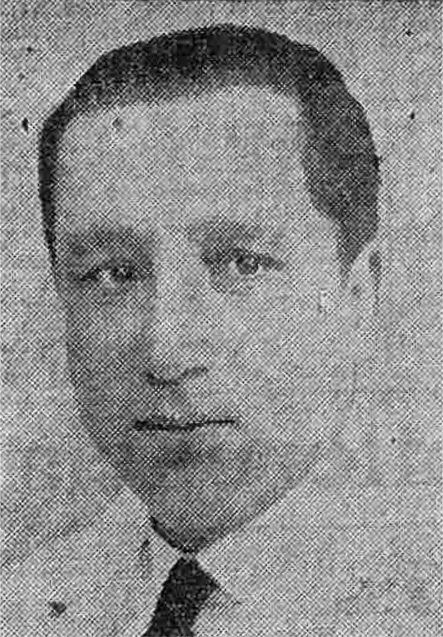
- Salas in 1925

Minister of Health, Welfare and Social Assistance
- In office 2 August 1947 – 7 July 1948
- President: Gabriel González Videla
- Preceded by: Manuel Sanhueza Flores
- Succeeded by: Guillermo Varas Contreras

Mayor of Santiago
- In office 9 April 1946 – 9 January 1950
- Preceded by: Galvarino Gallardo
- Succeeded by: Mario Valdés Morandé

Minister of Hygiene, Assistance and Social Welfare
- In office 23 May 1927 – 17 November 1927
- President: Carlos Ibáñez del Campo
- Preceded by: Isaac Hevia
- Succeeded by: Office abolished

Minister of Hygiene, Assistance and Social Welfare
- In office 29 January 1925 – 10 October 1925
- President: Arturo Alessandri; Emilio Bello Codesido; Luis Barros Borgoño
- Preceded by: Alejandro del Río
- Succeeded by: Pedro Lautaro Ferrer

Personal details
- Born: 8 July 1888 Talca, Chile
- Died: 16 October 1955 (aged 67) Santiago, Chile
- Education: University of Chile (LL.B)
- Profession: Lawyer

José Santos Salas Morales (8 July 1888 – 16 October 1955) was a Chilean physician and politician. He was a candidate for the presidential election of 1925, where he was defeated by Emiliano Figueroa.

Santos Salas was one of the leaders of the Social-Republican Union of the Wage Earners of Chile (USRACh), a party that brought together workers and their unions during the 1920s. The leftist movement emerged in parallel to the Communist Party.

He was appointed by the Government Junta of 1925 as Minister of Hygiene, Social Assistance and Welfare. He was Minister of Justice and Hygiene during the administration of Carlos Ibáñez del Campo in 1927. Salas was also Minister of Health of Gabriel González Videla in 1947.

Gonzalez Videla appointed him as mayor of Santiago in 1946, in a position he held until 1950.

== Personal life ==
During his life, numerous rumors circulated that Salas was homosexual due to his effeminate nature, however he did not confirm or deny this in public. Carmen Lazo points out that during a visit to his house, located at Pedro de Valdivia Avenue, Salas confessed that he was asexual since his parents were expecting a daughter and therefore raised him as a female person, and that he had no interest in neither men nor women.

== See also ==
- History of Chile
- 1925 Chilean presidential election
- Social-Republican Union of the Wage Earners of Chile
- Ministry of Health
- Ministry of Justice

== Sources ==
- Ramón Folch, Armando de. Biografías de Chilenos. Santiago: Ediciones UC.
