= Social-Republican Union of the Wage Earners of Chile =

Chilean political party, 1925–1927

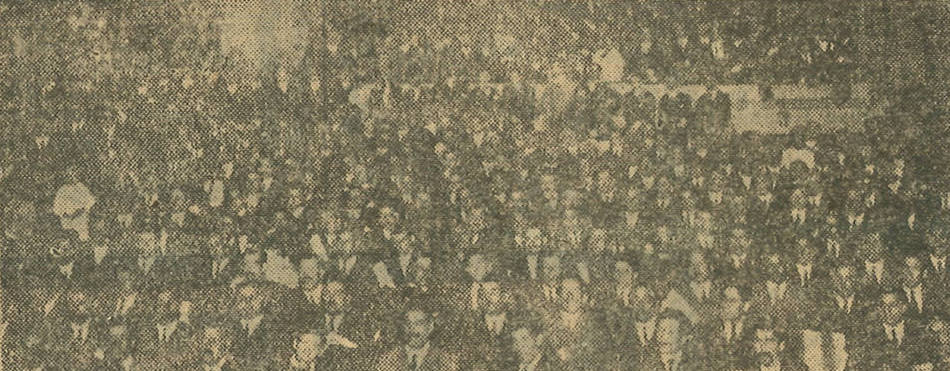
The foundation of the party in 1925.

The Social-Republican Union of the Wage Earners of Chile (Spanish: Unión Social Republicana de Asalariados de Chile, USRACh) was a Chilean left-wing political party which existed between 1925 and 1927.

In the presidential elections of 1925 it presented the candidacy of José Santos Salas. With the arrival of Carlos Ibáñez del Campo to the government, the members of the USRACh were exiled and persecuted. In the 1930s, many of its former militants joined the Socialist Party, the Communist Left and the Republican Confederation of Civic Action of Workers.

== Results in parliamentary elections ==
Year of election (max number of parliament seats)	1925 (132)
Number of parliament members	9
Votes obtained	--
Votes percentage	6,82

== See also ==
- 1925 Chilean presidential election

== Sources ==
The original version of this article draws heavily on the corresponding article in the Spanish-language Wikipedia, which was accessed in the version of February 1, 2017.
