= Luis Salas Romo =

Chilean politician (1878–1947)

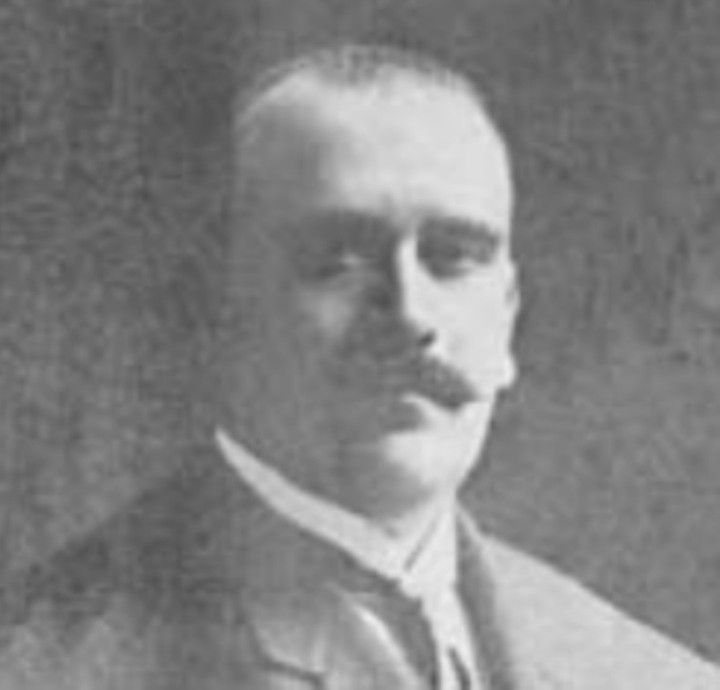

Member of the Senate
- In office 15 May 1926 – 6 June 1932
- Constituency: 4th Provincial Grouping
- In office 15 May 1924 – 11 September 1924

Member of the Chamber of Deputies
- In office 15 May 1921 – 15 May 1924
- Constituency: Santiago

Personal details
- Born: 18 February 1878 Santiago, Chile
- Died: 5 January 1947 (aged 68) Quilicura, Chile
- Party: Radical Party
- Spouse: Rosa Amelia Romo Romo
- Education: University of Chile
- Occupation: Lawyer, politician

Luis Salas Romo (18 February 1878 – 5 January 1947) was a Chilean lawyer and politician. A member of the Radical Party, he served as senator of the Republic and held several ministerial posts during the early twentieth century.
