= Juan Castellón Larenas =

Chilean politician (1843–1919)

Juan Castellón
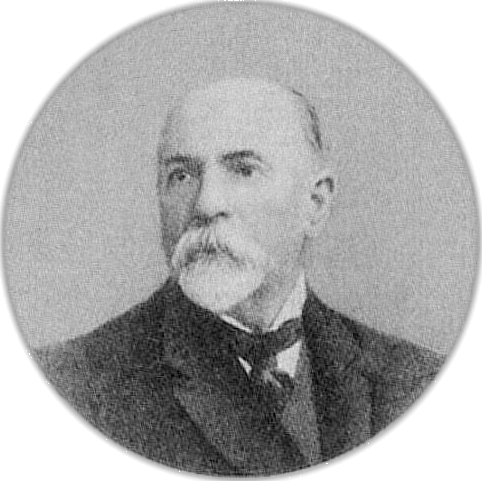

Member of the Chamber of Deputies
- In office 14 May 1914 – 31 May 1915
- Constituency: Itata
- In office 1 June 1900 – 31 May 1903
- Constituency: Santiago
- In office 1888–1891
- Constituency: Concepción and Talcahuano
- In office 1882–1888
- Constituency: La Laja
- In office 1876–1879
- Constituency: Coelemu

Member of the Senate
- In office 1 June 1906 – 31 May 1912
- Constituency: Malleco
- In office 19 July 1904 – 1906
- Constituency: Maule
- In office 5 June 1899 – 31 May 1900
- Constituency: Atacama
- In office 10 December 1891 – 1897
- Constituency: Concepción

Personal details
- Born: 1843 Concepción, Chile
- Died: 14 September 1919 Santiago, Chile
- Party: Radical Party
- Spouse: Respicia Bello Donoso
- Parent(s): Augustín Castellón; Javiera Larenas
- Profession: Lawyer

Juan Castellón Larenas (1843 – 14 September 1919) was a Chilean lawyer, educator and politician who served in both the Chamber of Deputies and the Senate during several legislative periods.

A prominent member of the Radical Party, he also served as Minister of Foreign Affairs, Worship and Colonization and as Minister of Justice and Public Instruction.

== Biography ==
Castellón was born in Concepción in 1843, the son of Augustín Castellón Binimelis and Javiera Larenas Rubio. He studied law in Concepción and qualified as a lawyer on 2 August 1867.

He married Respicia Bello Donoso, with whom he had children.

Castellón was active in journalism, literature and education in Concepción. He contributed to several magazines and political newspapers and participated in the development of the Revista del Sur and the newspaper El Sur.

He served as acting rector of the Liceo de Concepción from 1877 to 1878 and as its rector from 1878 to 1881. He also taught forensic practice and mining law at the institution until his resignation in 1881.

== Political career ==
Castellón joined the Radical Party in his youth and became one of its leading figures. He served as president of the party in Concepción and as president of its Central Board in 1901 and again in 1914.

He was first elected to the Chamber of Deputies for Coelemu for the 1876–1879 legislative term. He subsequently represented La Laja from 1882 to 1888 and Concepción and Talcahuano from 1888 to 1891. On 2 June 1885, he was elected First Vice President of the Chamber.

Castellón supported the congressional forces during the 1891 Chilean Civil War. He was arrested and sent out of the country, subsequently spending time in Europe.

Following the civil war, he entered the Senate as senator for Concepción, taking his seat on 10 December 1891. In 1899, following the death of senator Guillermo Matta, he was elected to represent Atacama and joined the Senate on 5 June of that year.

He returned to the Chamber of Deputies as representative for Santiago for the 1900–1903 legislative term. Following the death of senator Juan Antonio González in March 1904, Castellón was elected to replace him as senator for Maule. His credentials were provisionally approved on 19 July 1904, but the matter was ultimately archived in 1906 without definitive consideration.

Castellón was elected senator for Malleco for the 1906–1912 term, serving on the Public Instruction and Government committees. In 1914, he again returned to the Chamber of Deputies, replacing Carlos Maira as deputy for Itata and taking his seat on 14 May 1914.

Castellón also held several cabinet positions. He served as Minister of Foreign Affairs, Worship and Colonization from 23 October 1889 to 21 January 1890 and again from 14 March to 11 June 1892. He was Minister of Justice and Public Instruction from 31 December 1891 to 6 February 1892 and from 29 February to 24 March 1892. From 1915 to 1919, he served as a Councillor of State.

Castellón died in Santiago on 14 September 1919.
