= Mónica Echeverría =

Chilean journalist (1920–2020)

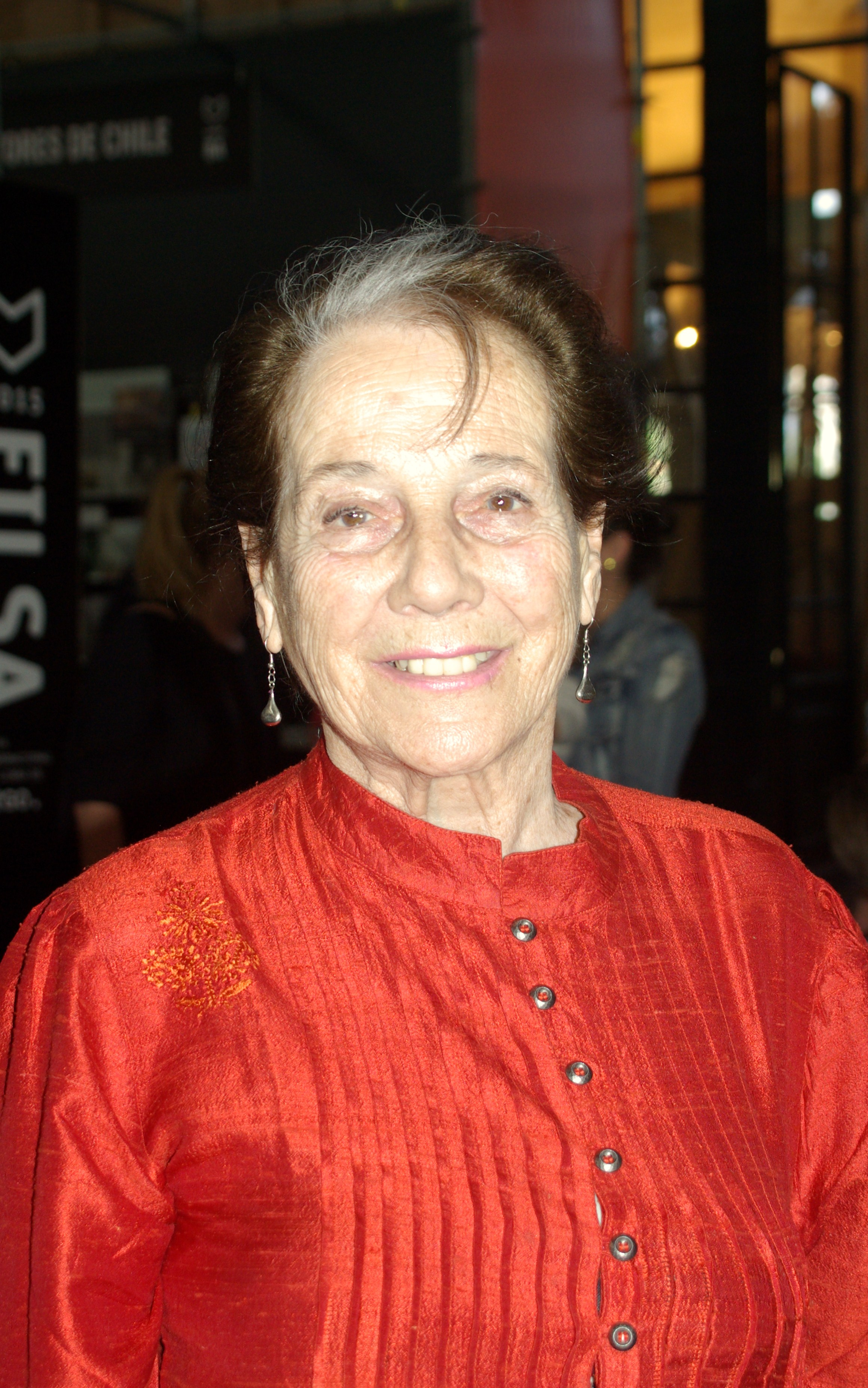
- Mónica Echeverría at FILSA 2015
- Born: Mónica Echeverría Yáñez; September 2, 1920; Santiago, Chile
- Died: January 3, 2020 (aged 99); La Reina, Santiago, Chile
- Education: Universidad de Chile
- Occupations: Journalist; writer; actor; professor
- Spouse: Fernando Castillo Velasco
- Children: 5 including, Carmen Castillo
- Mother: María Flora Yáñez
- Relatives: Eliodoro Yáñez (grandfather); Juan Emar (uncle); Andrés Pascal Allende (ex-son-in-law)

Monica Echeverría Yáñez (September 2, 1920 – January 3, 2020) was a Chilean journalist, writer, actress and a Literature professor. She defined herself as a feminist since "before people called it that" and called herself a "rebel" and "anarchist" in the face of the neoliberal economic course of the Chilean government.

== Biography ==
Echevarría was the daughter of an aristocratic family. Her parents were José Rafael Echeverría Larraín and the writer María Flora Yáñez, and her grandfather was the politician Eliodoro Yáñez Ponce de León. Until she was eight years old she lived in France with her grandfather, who had to go into exile due to the dictatorship of General Carlos Ibáñez del Campo. When she returned to Chile, she had forgotten how to speak Spanish.

She studied at the Monjas Esclavas del Sagrado Corazón de Jesús, which she would later call a "retrograde school". She then got into the Pedagogical Institute of the Universidad de Chile, and later practiced for many years as a professor of Spanish.

She had dedicated twenty-two years of her life to teaching as a Literature professor. This activity did not prevent her from developing her vocation for theater where she participated as an actress, director and author in different works.

Following the military coup against the socialist president Salvador Allende in 1973, Mónica Echeverría and her husband traveled to England where she taught literature and grammar at the Technical School, and returned to Chile in 1978. After her return, she was in charge of the Centro Cultural Estación Mapocho.

In 2016, Mónica Echeverría published ¡Háganme Callar!. In this autobiographical work, the author remembers with sorrow her privileged childhood and carries out an acid critique and without nuances of the "conversos" a group of young dreamers who divested themselves of their revolutionary ideas of the 60s to embrace the current neoliberalism.

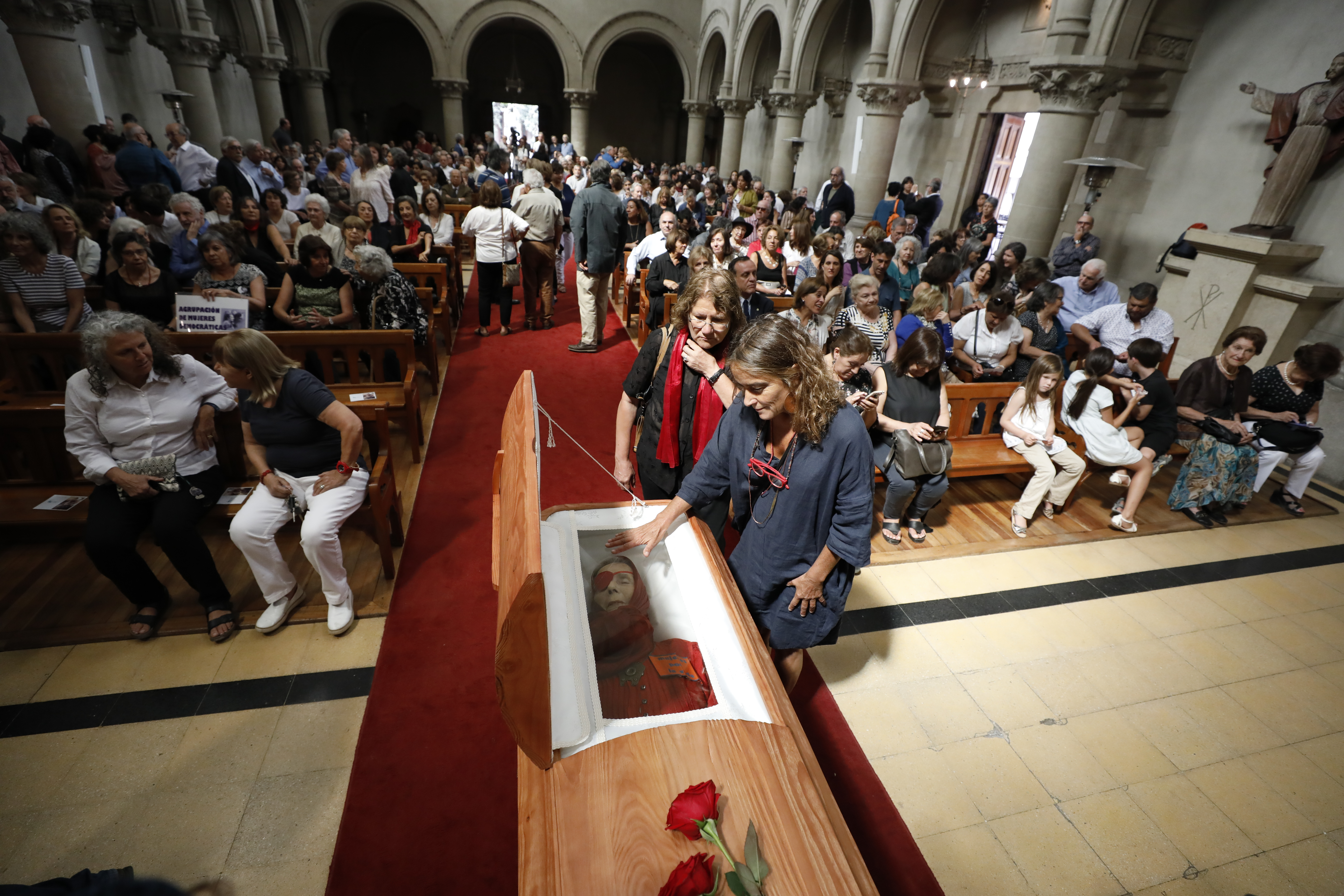
The funeral of Mónica Echeverría

Echeverría died on 3 January 2020 in La Reina, Santiago aged 99. Her last wish was to wear a red eyepatch in homage to the victims of the eye injuries in the 2019–2020 Chilean protests and a message reading mujeres por la vida on her chest, a Chilean feminist movement from early 1980s that fought against the Pinochet regime, which she was part of.

== Personal life ==
She married in 1944 the architect and politician Fernando Castillo Velasco and they had five children called Carmen, Cristián, Fernando José (one of the leaders of the so-called community or sect of Pirque), Javier (who died in a car accident at the beginning of the 70's) and Consuelo.

== Public life ==
Monica Echeverria and her husband accepted an invitation of the University of Cambridge to join their teaching staff in 1973. The next they were at England, while Cristián and Carmen fought clandestinely against the dictatorship of Augusto Pinochet. They returned in 1978.

During her time in the university, she became a fan of the theater and was the director of children's shows, writing pieces and, in 1955, co-founding the Teatro ICTUS. She stood out as director of children's theater and her most successful works were the serials of Quiquirico, El círculo encantado, Chumingo y el pirata de lata, Guatapique, Zambacanuta.

As a writer she published her first book, Antihistoria de un luchador, in 1993, it took eight years for her to finish this 500-page biography of the unionist Clotario Blest. Others, mostly novels based on real characters, such as Violeta Parra or General Pinochet, followed this work.

== Works ==
- Echeverría, Mónica (1993). Antihistoria de un luchador: Clotario Blest 1823-1990. LOM Ediciones.
- Echeverría, Mónica (1996). Agonía de una irreverente, historic novel based on the biography of Inés Echeverría Bello, Editorial Sudamericana, Santiago.
- Echeverría, Mónica (1999). Crónicas vedadas, Sudamericana, Santiago. In 2017 was re-edited by Catalonia with the name: Crónicas vedadas: Radiografía de la élite impune (2017).
- Echeverría, Mónica (2002). El vuelo de la memoria, with Carmen Castillo, LOM, Santiago.
- Echeverría, Mónica (2005) Cara y sello de una dinastía, a novel about Agustín Edwards’ family
- Echeverría, Mónica (2008) Krassnoff, Arrastrado por su destino, testimony, Catalonia, Santiago.
- Echeverría, Mónica (2010). Yo, Violeta, biography of Violeta Parra, Plaza & Janés, Santiago.
- Echeverría, Mónica (2012) Insaciables, with Patricia Lutz; novel about Augusto Pinochet, Plaza & Janés, Santiago.
- Echeverría, Mónica (2016). ¡Háganme callar!, cronic, Ceibo Ediciones, Santiago.
- Echeverría, Mónica (2018) Agonía de una irreverente. Editorial Catalonia, Santiago.

== Films ==
- La colonia penal, by Raúl Ruiz, 1970.
- La luna en el espejo, by Silvio Caiozzi, 1990.
- Días de campo, by Raúl Ruiz, 2004.
