= President of the Senate of Chile =

Presiding officer of the Chilean Senate

- Presidente del Senado de la República de Chile
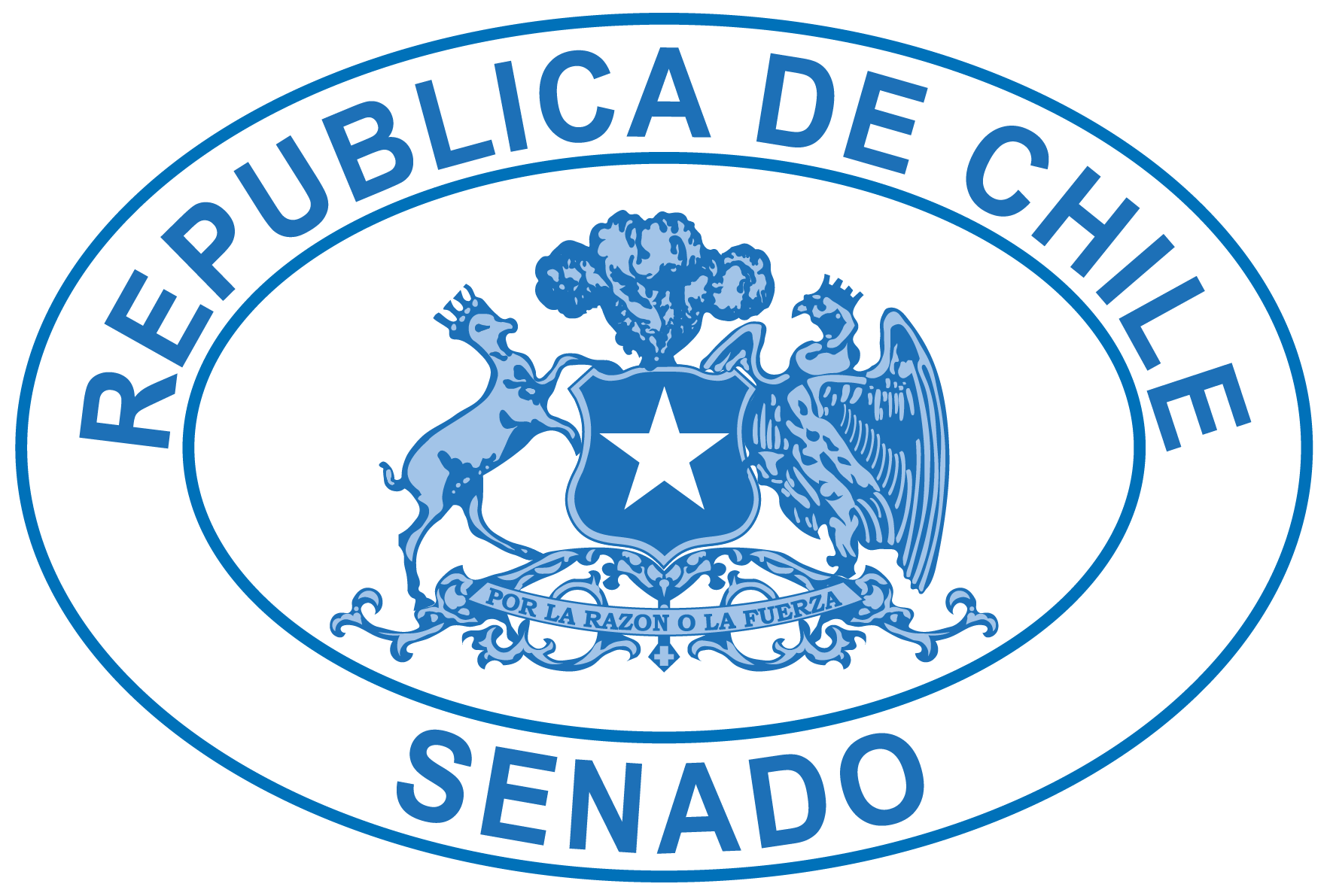
- Emblem of the Senate of Chile

- Flag of Chile

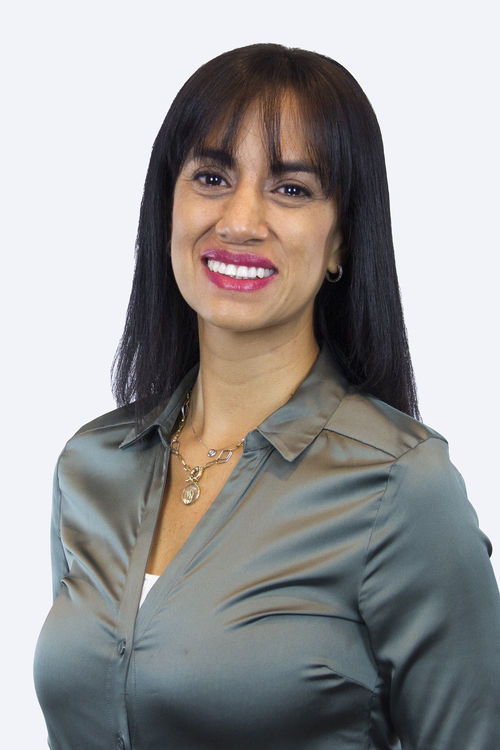
- Incumbent; Paulina Núñez Urrutia since 11 March 2026
- Senate of Chile
- Style: Her Excellency; The Honorable
- Type: Presiding officer
- Seat: National Congress of Chile, Valparaíso
- Appointer: Senate of Chile
- Term length: Four years
- Constituting instrument: Constitution of Chile
- Formation: 4 July 1811; 215 years ago
- First holder: Juan Antonio Ovalle
- Deputy: First Vice President of the Senate; Second Vice President of the Senate
- Salary: US$133,282; CLP$112,198,212
- Website: Official website (in Spanish)

The president of the Senate of Chile is the presiding officer of the Senate of Chile. The position comes after the Ministers of State in the line of succession of the President of Chile in case of temporary incapacitation or vacancy, according to Article 29 of the Constitution of Chile.

== Functions ==
The President of the Senate receives no special treatment in the sessions of Senate. However, in the official communications the President holds the title of Excelencia ("Excellency"). The President is elected among current senators by the members themselves, and forms the Mesa de la Corporación (Committee of Chambers of the Congress) along with the Senate's Vice President.

The President's responsibilities include decreeing the summons to the Senate for its sessions, presiding over sessions and directing the debates on the Senate floor, acting as a representative of the Senate by defending its parliamentary jurisdiction and dignity, and presiding over the sessions of the Congreso Pleno (plenary meeting of both chambers).

== Presidents of the Senate of Chile ==
President of the Senate	Term
Pedro de Vivar y Ruiz de Azúa	1812–1814
José Antonio de Errázuriz y Madariaga	1814
Dissolution of the National Congress by the Chilean War of Independence	1814–1818
José Ignacio Cienfuegos Arteaga	1818–1822
Agustín Manuel de Eyzaguirre y Arechavala	1823
Juan Egaña Risco	1824
Juan de Dios Vial del Río	1828–1829
José María Vásquez de Novoa López de Artigas	1829
Dissolution of the National Congress by the Chilean Civil War of 1829	1829–1831
José Ignacio Cienfuegos Arteaga	1831–1834
Diego Elizondo Prado	1834–1837
Diego Antonio Barros Fernández	1837–1840
Gabriel José Tocornal Jiménez	1840–1843
José Miguel Yrarrázaval Alcalde	1843–1846
Diego José Benavente Bustamante	1846–1855
Francisco Antonio Pinto Díaz – died in office	1855–1861
Manuel José Cerda Campos	1861–1864
José Rafael Larraín	1864–1867
Juan de Dios Correa de Saa y Martínez	1867–1870
Álvaro José Miguel Covarrubias Ortúzar	1870–1873
José Joaquín Pérez Mascayano	1873–1876
Álvaro José Miguel Covarrubias Ortúzar	1876–1882
Antonio Varas de la Barra	1882–1888
Domingo Santa María González – died in office	1888–1889
Adolfo Eastman Quiroga	1889–1891
Waldo Silva Algüe	1891–1894
Agustín Edwards Ross	1894–1897
Fernando Lazcano Echaurren	1897–1906
Juan Luis Sanfuentes Andonaegui	1906–1909
José Elías Balmaceda Fernández	1909–1912
Ricardo Matte Pérez	1912–1915
Eduardo Charme Fernández	1915–1918
Ismael Tocornal Tocornal	1918–1921
Luis Claro Solar	1921–1924
Eliodoro Yáñez Ponce de León	1924
Dissolution of the National Congress by the Government Junta of 1924	1924–1925
Enrique Oyarzún Mondaca	1925–1930
Pedro Opazo Letelier	1930–1932
Dissolution of the National Congress by the Socialist Republic of Chile	1932
Alberto Cabero Díaz	1932–1933
Ignacio Urrutia Manzano	1933–1934
Nicolás Marambio Montt	1934–1935
Ignacio Urrutia Manzano	1935–1936
José Maza Fernández	1936–1937
Miguel Cruchaga Tocornal	1937–1941
Florencio Durán Bernales	1941–1944
Pedro Opazo Letelier	1944
José Francisco Urrejola Menchaca	1944–1945
Arturo Alessandri Palma	1945–1949
Humberto Álvarez Suárez	1949
Arturo Alessandri Palma	1949–1950
Fernando Alessandri Rodríguez	1950–1958
Guillermo Pérez de Arce	1958
Hernán Videla Lira	1958–1962
Hugo Zepeda Barrios	1962–1965
Hermes Ahumada Pacheco – provisional	1965
Tomás Reyes Vicuña	1965–1966
Juan Luis Maurás	1966
Tomás Reyes Vicuña	1966
Salvador Allende Gossens	1966–1969
Tomás Pablo Elorza	1969–1971
Patricio Aylwin Azócar	1971–1972
José Ignacio Palma Vicuña	1972–1973
Américo Acuña Rosas – provisional	1973
Eduardo Frei Montalva	1973
Dissolution and replacement by the Government Junta of 1973	1973–1990
Gabriel Valdés Subercaseaux	1990–1996
Sergio Diez Urzúa	1996–1998
Andrés Zaldívar Larraín	1998–2004
Hernán Larraín Fernández	2004–2005
Sergio Romero Pizarro	2005–2006
Eduardo Frei Ruiz-Tagle	2006–2008
Adolfo Zaldívar Larraín	2008–2009
Jovino Novoa Vásquez	2009–2010
Jorge Pizarro Soto	2010–2011
Guido Girardi Lavín	2011–2012
Camilo Escalona Medina	2012–2013
Jorge Pizarro Soto	2013–2014
Isabel Allende Bussi	2014–2015
Patricio Walker Prieto	2015–2016
Ricardo Lagos Weber	2016–2017
Andrés Zaldívar Larraín	2017–2018
Carlos Montes Cisternas	2018–2019
Jaime Quintana	2019–2020
Adriana Muñoz D'Albora	2020–2021
Yasna Provoste Campillay	2021–2021
Ximena Rincón González	2021–2022
Álvaro Antonio Elizalde Soto	2022–2023
Juan Antonio Coloma Correa	2023–2024
José García Ruminot	2024–2025
Manuel José Ossandón	2025–2026
Paulina Núñez Urrutia	2026–present

== See also ==
- National Congress of Chile

== Sources ==
- República de Chile (1942). "VII. Nómina de ciudadanos que han formado los senados de Chile". Manual del Senado. 1810–1942 (PDF) (in Spanish). Santiago de Chile: Imprenta Universitaria. (in Spanish)
- Valencia Avaria, Luis (1986). Anales de la República: textos constitucionales de Chile y registro de los ciudadanos que han integrado los poderes ejecutivo y legislativo desde 1810 (in Spanish) (2ª edición ed.). Santiago de Chile: Editorial Andrés Bello. (in Spanish)
