= Radomiro Tomic =

Chilean politician (1914–1992)

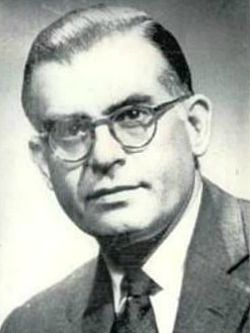

Ambassador of Chile to the United States
- In office 4 March 1965 – 13 April 1969
- President: Eduardo Frei Montalva
- Preceded by: Sergio Gutiérrez Olivos
- Succeeded by: Domingo Santa María Santa Cruz

Senator of the Republic of Chile
- In office 15 May 1961 – 4 March 1965

President of the National Falange
- In office 1946–1947
- Preceded by: Tomás Reyes Vicuña
- Succeeded by: Tomás Reyes Vicuña
- In office 1952–1953

Personal details
- Born: 7 May 1914 Calama, Chile
- Died: 3 January 1992 (aged 77) Santiago, Chile
- Party: Falange Nacional (1938–1957); Christian Democratic Party (1957–1992)
- Spouse: Olaya Errázuriz Echenique (m. 1940)
- Children: 9; Amaya, Esteban, Carlos, Gabriel, Felipe, Blas, Olaya, Juan Cristóbal and Francisco
- Education: Pontifical Catholic University of Chile
- Profession: Lawyer and politician

Radomiro Tomic Romero (Calama, 7 May 1914 – Santiago de Chile, 3 January 1992) was a Chilean lawyer and politician of Croatian origin, and candidate for the presidency of the Chilean Republic in the 1970 election. He graduated as a lawyer from the Pontifical Catholic University of Chile (PUC). He began his political activity in the Social-Christian circles of the PUC, and was one of the co-founders of the Falange Nacional (FN, future Christian Democracy, DC) in 1938. He became president of the party in 1946–1947 and 1952–1953. He was married to Olaya Errázuriz Echenique, and together they had 9 children.

Among other activities Tomic was director of the newspaper El Tarapacá of Iquique (1937–1941) and later of the Editorial del Pacífico.

Tomic served as deputy for Arica, Pisagua and Iquique (1941–1949). When senator and poet Pablo Neruda was banned by the Ley de Defensa Permanente de la Democracia (Law of Permanent Defense of Democracy)—which banned the Communist Party of Chile and removed numerous voters from the rolls)—Tomić won the vacated seat in a by-election. He served as senator for Tarapacá and Antofagasta (1950–1953), and then for Aconcagua and Valparaíso (1961–1965). In 1965 he resigned his senatorial seat to become Chile's ambassador to the United States (4 March 1965 – April 1968).

As leader of the progressive wing of the Christian Democrats, he was the party's presidential candidate in the 1970 election in which Salvador Allende won a plurality and, with Tomic's support, was ratified by parliament as president. Allende died three years later in the Chilean coup of 1973, which put an end to democracy in Chile for over 15 years.

As a parliamentarian and politician Tomic was a defender of Chilean sovereignty over the country's copper deposits and in the nationalization of that industry. In 1997, Codelco named a large mine in his honor.

Tomic died in 1992 in Santiago.

== Origins and family ==
Of Croatian descent, he was the fifth of seven children of the marriage between Esteban Tomic Dvornik (mayor of Calama in the 1930s, who inaugurated the present town hall of the commune) and María Romero García. He had seven siblings.

In 1940, while in Stockholm (Sweden), he married Olaya Errázuriz Echeñique, with whom he had nine children: Amaya, Esteban, who was Chilean Ambassador to the Organization of American States (OAS), Carlos, Gabriel, Felipe, Blas, Olaya, Juan Cristóbal and Francisco.

He studied at Colegio San Luis in Antofagasta. After school, he entered the Law School Pontifical Catholic University of Chile. He graduated as a lawyer in 1941 with the thesis: International law: the inter-American system. Upon graduation he obtained the "Grand Prize" for the most outstanding student.

== Professional career ==
He worked in the field of journalism. Between 1937 and 1941, he was director of the newspaper El Tarapacá de Iquique, where he succeeded Eduardo Frei Montalva. He later directed the publishing house Editorial del Pacífico. He also taught Economic Policy, Political Economy and Social Legislation at the Catholic University of Chile and the Polytechnic Institute. He also held the post of director of the Centros del Progreso for Tarapacá and Antofagasta.

== Political career ==
He started in politics during his university days, when he became president of the Law Students' Centre of the PUC and later, of the Students' Federation of his university.

In 1938, together with Eduardo Frei Montalva, Bernardo Leighton, Manuel Antonio Garretón and Rafael Gumucio, among others, he founded the Falange Nacional (FN). He was its national president between 1946 and 1947, and again between 1952 and 1953.

He was elected deputy in two consecutive periods for Arica, Pisagua and Iquique (1941–1945 and 1945–1949) He was a substitute deputy on the Standing Committee on Public Education and was a member of the Standing Committee on National Defence. In his second term he was a substitute member of the Standing Committee on Constitution, Legislation and Justice and was a member of the Standing Committee on Roads and Public Works. Between 1945 and 1946 he was a member of the Falangist Committee.

Later he was senator for the provinces of Tarapacá and Antofagasta (1950–1953, in a complementary election, replacing Pablo Neruda who was disqualified by the Law of Permanent Defence of Democracy. He was a substitute senator in the Standing Committee on Finance and Budgets; in the Standing Committee on Public Works and Roads; and in the Standing Committee on Hygiene, Health and Public Assistance.

In 1961 he was elected senator for Aconcagua and Valparaíso (for the period 1961–1965). He was a member of the Standing Committee on Constitution, Legislation, Justice and Regulation; and the Committee on Public Education. He did not finish his parliamentary term after being posted as Chilean ambassador to the United States on 4 March 1965. He was replaced by Benjamín Prado Casas.

As a congressman he participated in various international activities: in 1951 he was a delegate to the Conference of American Foreign Ministers held in Washington; in 1955 he was received as a guest of honour by the Yugoslavian Government; in 1957, he was a member of the delegation that negotiated the Trade Treaty with Argentina and participated in the International Congress of São Paulo. In 1958, he participated in the Brussels International Congress; he was invited by the Department of State in Washington and by the Italian Government. The following year, he travelled to Cuba as an official guest of the government, and in 1960, he visited Venezuela and Colombia also at the official invitation.

Among the motions presented which became law of the Republic are: Law No. 7.855 of 8 September 1944, amending the Organic Code of Courts with regard to the granting of degrees to lawyers; Law No. 7.884 of 27 September 1944; Law No. 7.884 of 27 September 1944, amending the Organic Code of Courts with regard to the granting of degrees to lawyers; Law No. 7.884 of 27 September 1944, amending the Organic Code of Courts with regard to the granting of degrees to lawyers; Law No. 7.855 of 27 September 1944. 884 of 27 September 1944, which reduced fares on State Railways and private railways for sportsmen; Law No. 8.715 of 12 December 1946 on the establishment of the irremovability of fiscal, semi-fiscal and other employees during periods of presidential elections. In addition to the Law that created the extraordinary tax on copper, the Junta Nacional de Auxilio Escolar y Becas, and the Law of the Copper Corporation (Codelco), among others.

During his parliamentary work, he was a fierce advocate of the Chileanisation of copper, which is why in 1992 Codelco named a mine after him.

In 1965 he resigned his seat as senator to accept the post of ambassador of Chile to United States, serving from 4 March 1965 to 13 April 1968.

== Ideology and party activity ==
Leader of the progressive ideological tendency of the Christian Democracy, he was the presidential candidate of his party in the 1970 Chilean presidential election, which was won by Salvador Allende. Tomic supported Allende's ratification by Parliament.

He opened the political campaign with an emblematic phrase that is remembered for the turning point it marked within the party:

I am not trembling to say it: either the democratic and popular revolution shaping an immense effort of people's participation for Chile to reach another horizon and a new destiny, or the institutional collapse will seriously divide Chileans against themselves

— Radomiro Tomic

Tomic ran a left-wing campaign that marked a break from the moderation of Eduardo Frei Montalva. British historian Alan Angell remarked that "Tomic's campaign looked almost as radical in tone and pronouncement as that of Allende", which attracted left-wing voters and progressive Catholics at the cost of right-leaning DC supporters, who often defected to Alessandri. Tomic performed exceptionally well amongst women and churchgoing Catholics, but failed to outcompete Allende in traditionally left-wing areas.

Tomic was considered "second only to Frei" in the Christian Democratic leadership, and his nomination was considered guaranteed long before 1970. Serving as Ambassador of Chile to the United States, he was able to make connections with the American establishment and earn prestige amongst international leaders. At the same time, because he served abroad, he was not associated with Frei's unpopular policies. Identifying himself as a progressive Catholic, Tomic openly criticized capitalism and spoke of "structural transformation that would usher in Catholic communitarianism", supporting nationalization of Chilean copper industry and advocating for "a more significant presence of the Chilean state" in other industries. When asked by Sidney Weintraub in July 1968 what his ideal of Catholic communitarianism meant, Tomic replied that "everybody knows what capitalism is, […] everybody knows what communism is; communitarianism is neither."

Tomic desired an alliance with the left-wing parties of Popular Unity, arguing that the goal of the Christian Democrats "was to bring about substantial economic and social transformation and its goals did not differ significantly from those of the Marxist Left". According to Tomic, Chile was in dire need of progressive reforms, and a coalition of left-wing parties with Christian Democrats would unite the Chilean progressives and secure a parliamentary majority needed to secure reform. Despite cold reception of his idea by Frei and the American administration, Tomic fiercely defended it, arguing that allying with the moderate Left to construct a communiarian system "could save Chile from an impending catastrophe" and "compared his prognosis about the future of Chile to Churchill’s early warnings against Hitler in the 1930s", describing his plan as a way to prevent both a communist revolution and a reactionary military coup in Chile. While the U.S. Ambassador Edward M. Korry was opposed to Tomic's plan and believed that the anti-clerical Communist Party of Chile would never agree to an alliance with Christian Democrats, Undersecretary of State Nicholas Katzenbach supported it, writing: "I have heard that Chilean Communists are less radical than the Socialists. Tomic's idea of a coalition of the left may not be all that bad. At any rate, it is worth further investigation."

Despite being wary of Tomic because of his connections to the United States, the general secretary of the Communist Party, Luis Corvalán, called Tomic and Christian Democrats "a good part" of Chilean politics and praised them for their "revolutionary, anti-imperialist, and antioligarchic" outlook. According to George W. Grayson, likewise the most left-wing wing of Christian Democrats, the rebeldes (rebels), were willing to embrace Tomic despite his connections to the Johnson administration. During his 1970 presidential campaign, Tomic stated that "it is impossible to be both a Catholic and a capitalist", called for a "noncapitalist path of development" and sought a union with socialist and communist parties, emphasizing that he envisioned "not a mere electoral alliance but a solid platform on which to base a revolutionary government." Ultimately, Tomic finished third because his left-wing campaign failed to make sufficient inroads with the poor and left-wing voters, and a fraction of Christian Democrat middle-class base defected to Alessandri. Albert L. Michaels argues that despite Tomic's values of communitarianism and liberation theology, Frei's administration made Christian Democrats so unpopular that Tomic "could do little to outbid Allende for support among the direct victims of austerity, inflation, economic slump, and official violence."

During the Chilean military dictatorship he lived for a few years in Geneva. And in 1990, President Aylwin, at the time, appointed him ambassador to the UN in Geneva.

As a parliamentarian and politician, he defended Chilean sovereignty over copper deposits and the role of the State in large-scale copper mining (see Chileanisation of copper). In 1992, CODELCO named a Radomiro Tomic deposit in his honour.

He died in 1992 of a liver ailment. To this day, his party still remembers his ideas and considers him one of its most important figures in history. Meanwhile, in his native Calama, the newest high school of the Municipal Corporation of Social Development (COMDES), created in 2002, bears his name.

=== 1970 Chilean presidential election ===
| Candidate | Party | Coalition/ political affiliation | Votes | % |
|---|---|---|---|---|
| Salvador Allende Gossens | PS | Unidad Popular | 1 070 334 | 36.62% |
| Jorge Alessandri Rodríguez | Independent | PN–DR | 1 031 159 | 35.27% |
| Radomiro Tomić Romero | PDC | PDC–PADENA | 821 801 | 28.11% |
| Total of valid votes | | | 2 923 294 | 98.93% |
| Blank and invalid votes | | | 31 505 | 1.07% |
| Total votes cast | | | 2 954 799 | 100% |
| Total number of registered participants | | | 3 539 747 | |

== Sources ==
- This article draws heavily on the corresponding article in the Spanish Wikipedia.
