= Carmen Castillo (filmmaker) =

French-Chilean filmmaker and screenwriter

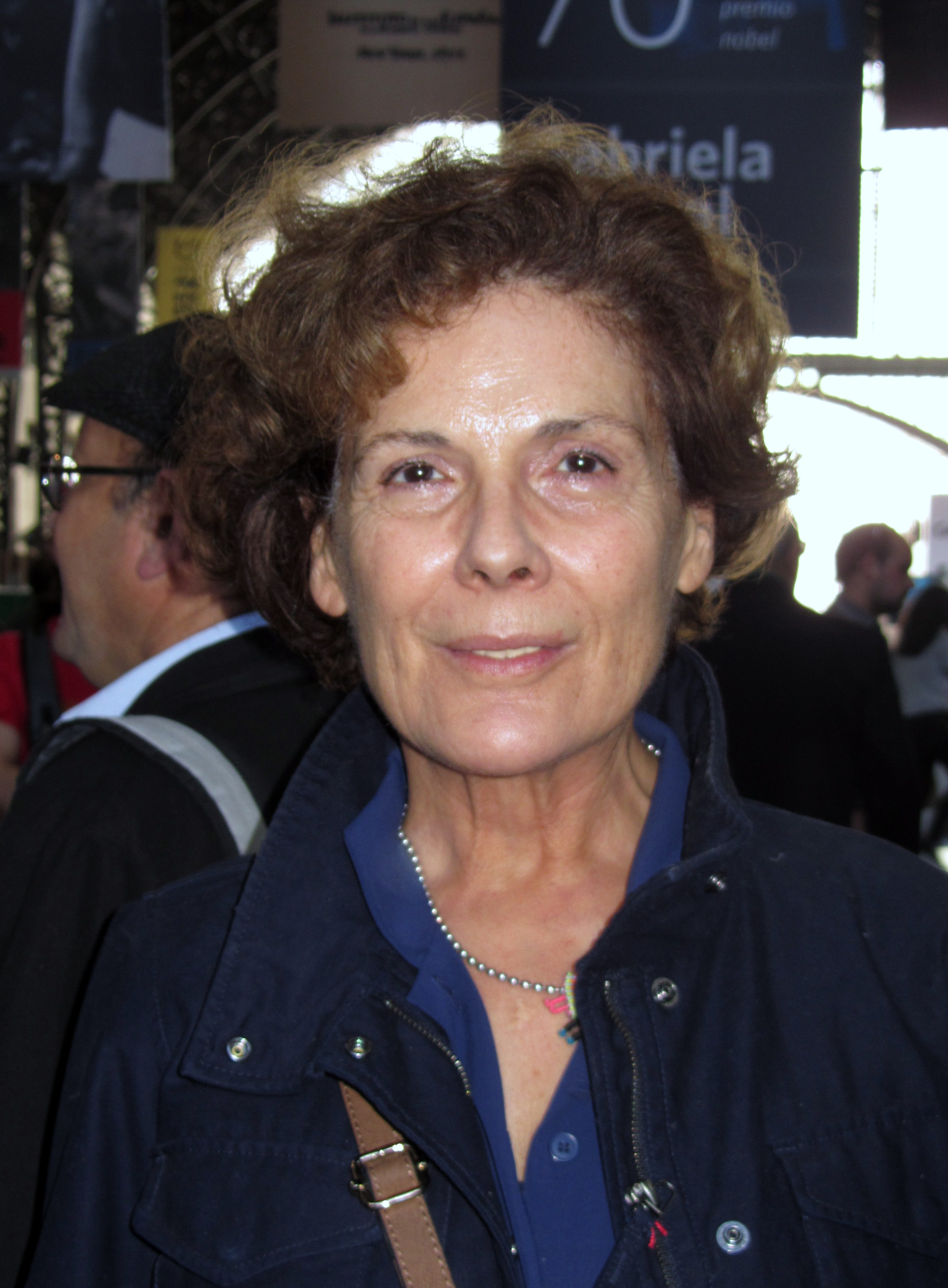
- Castillo at the 2015 Santiago International Book Fair
- Born: María del Carmen Castillo Echeverría; 21 May 1945 (age 81); Santiago, Chile
- Citizenship: Chile; France
- Education: University of Chile
- Political party: Movement of the Revolutionary Left (MIR)
- Spouse: Andrés Pascal Allende (m. 1966, divorced)
- Partners: Miguel Enríquez; Pierre Devert
- Parents: Fernando Castillo Velasco (father); Mónica Echeverría Yáñez (mother)
- Relatives: Eliodoro Yáñez (great-grandfather); María Flora Yáñez (grandmother); Juan Emar (great-uncle); Laura Allende (ex-mother-in-law); Denise Pascal (ex-sister-in-law)

Carmen Castillo is a French-Chilean filmmaker, scriptwriter, historian and academic, known for being a prominent member of the Chilean Resistance and Solidarity Movement.

== Early life ==
María del Carmen Castillo Echeverría was born on 21 May 1945 in Santiago, into an upper-class family. Her mother, Mónica Echeverría Yáñez (1920–2020), was a writer, journalist, actor, playwright and feminist activist. Her father, Fernando Castillo Velasco (1918–2013), was an architect, rector, politician and member of the Christian Democratic Party.

Through her mother, Castillo is the great-granddaughter of Eliodoro Yáñez, granddaughter of María Flora Yáñez and the great-niece of Juan Emar.

Castillo was educated at the University of Chile.

== Career ==
Before the 1973 coup d'état Castillo was a history professor and researcher at the Pontifical Catholic University of Chile. From 1970–1971, Castillo worked with Beatriz Allende at the La Moneda Palace.

In 2025, Castillo was on the 78th Cannes Film Festival jury for the L'Œil d'or.

== Personal life ==
In 1966, Castillo married Andrés Pascal Allende, a Chilean Marxist dissident and member of the MIR. The couple had one daughter, Camila Pascal Castillo, before later divorcing.

Castillo's son with Enríquez was born on the 29 December 1974 in London, and died on the 29 January 1975.

Castillo was the partner of French filmmaker Pierre Devert, with whom she had two children.

== Filmography ==
- (1983) Los muros de Santiago. Co-directed with Pierre Devert and Fabienne Servan-Schreiber.
- (1984) Estado de guerra: Nicaragua. Co-directed with Sylvie Blum.
- (1994) La flaca Alejandra. Documentary. Co-directed with Guy Girard. Story and self.
- (1994–1999) Tierras extranjeras, serie de largometrajes de ficción para la cadena Arte.
- (1995) La Verdadera Leyenda del Subcomandante Marcos.
- (1996) Inca de Oro. Documentary, co-directed with Sylvie Blum.
- (1999) El bolero, una educación amorosa. Documentary. Director.
- (2000) Viaje con la cumbia por Colombia.
- (2000) María Félix, la inalcanzable.
- (2000) El astrónomo y el indio. Documentary, co-directed with Sylvie Blum.
- (2001) El Camino del Inca.
- (2002) El astrónomo y el indio.
- (2003) José Saramago, el tiempo de una memoria.
- (2003) Mísia, la voz del fado.
- (2004) El país de mi padre.
- (2007) Calle Santa Fe. Documentary. Director and story.
- (2008) Desterria, un país llamado exilio. Documentary.
- (2010) El tesoro de América – El oro de Pascua Lama.
- (2011) Victor Serge, vivencias de un revolucionario.
- (2013) L’Espagne de Juan Goytisolo, Manuel Rivas et Bernardo Atxaga.
- (2015) Aún estamos vivos. Documetry. Director and story.
- (2017) Cuba en debate. Documentary. Director and story.
- (2019) Una embajada.Documentary.
