= Silvestre Ochagavía Echaurren =

Chilean politician

Silvestre Ochagavía

President of the Senate
- In office 15 May 1912 – 15 May 1915
- Preceded by: Carlos Aldunate Solar
- Succeeded by: Eduardo Charme

Personal details
- Born: 28 July 1862 Santiago, Chile
- Died: 29 January 1934 (aged 71) Santiago, Chile
- Party: Conservative Party
- Parent(s): Silvestre Ochagavía Errázuriz; Concepción Echaurren García-Huidobro
- Education: University of Chile (LL.B)
- Occupation: Politician
- Profession: Lawyer

Silvestre Ochagavía Echaurren (born 28 July 1862 – 29 January 1934) was a Chilean politician and lawyer who served as President of the Senate of Chile.

== Biography ==
He was born in Santiago, at the Chacra Ochagavía, on 28 July 1862, son of Silvestre Ochagavía Errázuriz and Concepción Echaurren García Huidobro.

He married Isabel Hurtado Larraín and, in a second marriage, Carmen Echeverría; he had eight children.

He received private instruction at his residence and later entered the Colegio de los Sagrados Corazones, where he studied between 1872 and 1878. He subsequently studied law at the University of Chile and was admitted to the bar on 9 November 1883.

He was member of the Conservative Party and served on its executive board in 1906 and on its General Directorate in 1912.

He was one of the country's major wine industrialists, owner of the “Viña Ochagavía,” located on the outskirts of Santiago.

In 1916 he was appointed Minister of Foreign Affairs, Worship and Colonization, serving from 30 April to 1 July 1916 under President Juan Luis Sanfuentes; he resigned due to internal disagreements within the Conservative Party.

In 1925 he presided over the Tribunal Calificador de Elecciones.

He was one of the owners and directors of the newspapers El Diario Ilustrado and La Unión. His travels abroad allowed him to acquire knowledge that he applied to his industrial enterprises. He also participated actively in charitable institutions and was member of the Club de la Unión and of the Sociedad Nacional de Agricultura (SNA).

He died in Santiago, at the Chacra Ochagavía, on 29 January 1934.

== Parliamentary career ==
He was elected deputy for Rere and Puchacay for the 1891–1894 period, joining Congress on 24 December 1891. He was re-elected for the same constituency for the 1894–1897 period, serving on the Permanent Commission of Education and Charity.

He was elected deputy for Llanquihue, Carelmapu and Osorno for the 1897–1900 period and continued serving on the Permanent Commission of Education and Charity. He was again elected for the same district for the 1903–1906 period, joining the Chamber on 28 July 1903 and serving as alternate member of the Permanent Commission of Finance.

He was elected senator for Chiloé for the 1912–1918 period and served as President of the Senate from 14 October 1914 to 2 June 1915. He was alternate member of the Permanent Commission of Foreign Affairs and member of the Permanent Commissions of Public Instruction, War and Navy, and Interior Police.

He was re-elected senator for Chiloé for the 1918–1924 period, serving as alternate member of the Permanent Commission of Foreign Affairs and Worship and member of the Permanent Commission of Interior Police.

He was again elected senator, this time for the Third Provincial Grouping “Aconcagua and Valparaíso,” for the 1926–1934 period. He served on the Permanent Commissions of Public Works and Communications and Labor and Social Welfare, and as alternate member of the Permanent Commission of Foreign Affairs.
