= San Sebastián Human Rights Film Festival =

The San Sebastián Human Rights Film Festival (Spanish: Festival de Cine y Derechos Humanos de San Sebastián) is a film festival in San Sebastián, Gipuzkoa dedicated to films on human rights and social issues, founded in 2003.

The festival is organized by the City Council of San Sebastián, the Aiete Human Rights House, Donostiakultura.com and several non-governmental organizations. It is held in late April each year.

== Human Rights Film Festival Award ==
The Human Rights Film Festival Award was first presented in 2007, with the aim of recognizing the work and commitment made to human rights through cinema. That year, the award was given to actress Pilar Bardem for her career in defending human rights, democracy and peace, and for her solidarity and work in support of the most vulnerable causes and groups.

Human Rights Film Festival Award Winners:

Year	Winner
2007	Pilar Bardem
2008	Elías Kerexeta
2009	José Luis Borau
2010	Goran Paskaljević
2011	Kim Longinotto
2012	Iciar Bollaín
2013	Patricio Guzmán
2014	Robert Guédiguian
2015	Lourdes Portillo
2016	Tony Gatlif
2017	Deepa Mehta
2018	Laurent Cantet
2019	Annemarie Jacir
2021	Montxo Armendáriz & Puy Oria
2022	EFA Abidin Kaid Saleh - Mendebaldeko Saharako Ikus-entzunezko Prestakuntza Eskola (Western Sahara Audiovisual Training School)
2023	Carmen Castillo
2024	Fernando León de Aranoa
