= Pampa Norte =

Pampa Norte may refer to:

- The former name of the copper mine Radomiro Tomic in Chile
- Pampa Norte (company), a company operating copper mines in Chile
