= Carlos Aldunate Solar =

Chilean politician (1856–1931)

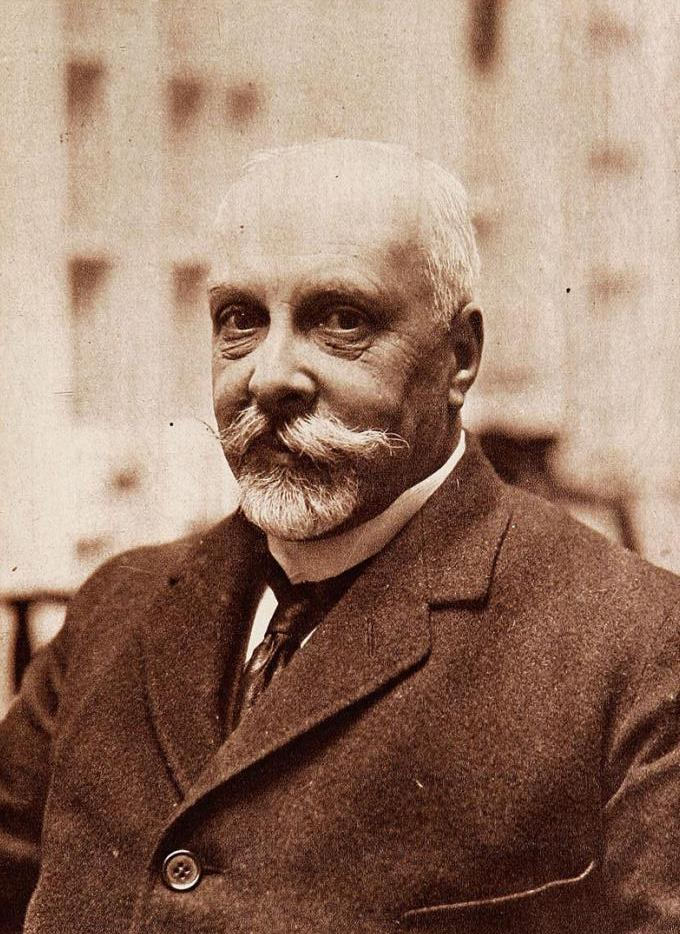
- Aldunate in 1915

Minister of Foreign Affairs, Worship and Colonization
- In office 12 September 1924 – 23 January 1925
- President: Government Junta of Chile, 1924–25
- Preceded by: Samuel Claro Lastarria
- Succeeded by: Office abolished
- In office 16 October 1922 – 21 December 1922
- President: Arturo Alessandri
- Preceded by: Emilio Bello Codesido
- Succeeded by: Luis Izquierdo Fredes

President of the Senate
- In office 29 October 1909 – 3 June 1912
- Preceded by: Francisco Valdés Vergara
- Succeeded by: Silvestre Ochagavía Echaurren

Member of the Senate
- In office 15 May 1909 – 15 May 1921
- Constituency: O'Higgins Province

Member of the Chamber of Deputies
- In office 1879–1882
- Constituency: Caupolicán

Personal details
- Born: 11 May 1856 Santiago, Chile
- Died: 14 June 1931 (aged 75) Santiago, Chile
- Party: Conservative Party
- Spouse: Pelagia Errázuriz Echaurren (m. 1884)
- Children: 12, including Carlos and Fernando
- Parent(s): Pedro Aldunate Carrera; Amalia Solar Valdés
- Relatives: Carlos Aldunate Lyon (grandson)
- Education: University of Chile (LL.B)
- Occupation: Lawyer

Carlos Aldunate Solar (11 May 1856 – 14 June 1931) was a Chilean lawyer, academic and politician.

A member of the Conservative Party, he served in the Senate of Chile from 1909 to 1921, was president of the Senate from 1913 to 1914, and twice served as Minister of Foreign Affairs, Worship and Colonization.

== Early life ==
Aldunate was born in Santiago on 11 May 1856, the son of Pedro Aldunate Carrera and Amalia Solar Valdés. He attended the Instituto Nacional and studied law at the University of Chile, where Miguel Luis Amunátegui was among his teachers. He qualified as a lawyer on 10 January 1876. In 1884, he married Pelagia Errázuriz Echaurren, with whom he had twelve children.

Aldunate specialized in legal matters concerning water rights and mining. For seventeen years he served as legal counsel to the Sociedad del Canal de Maipo, for which he helped draft its statutes and regulations. He also handled legal affairs for the Santiago Board of Public Welfare for fifteen years and was involved with several financial institutions.

He taught civil law at the University of Chile, where he also served as secretary of the Faculty of Law. From 1897 to 1904, he taught civil law and legal practice at the Pontifical Catholic University of Chile. His publications included Régimen jurídico de las aguas en Chile and a compilation of legislation and documents concerning the nitrate industry. He also served on a commission responsible for reviewing the Chilean Mining Code.

== Political career ==
A member of the Conservative Party, which he chaired for several terms, Aldunate first served as a substitute member of the Chamber of Deputies for Caupolicán from 1879 to 1882.

He was elected to the Senate for O'Higgins Province for the 1909–1915 term and was reelected for 1915–1921. He served as president of the Senate from 14 October 1913 to 14 October 1914. His legislative work included matters concerning water-user associations, indigenous land ownership, electoral law, the merchant marine and the iron industry. He also served on a commission concerned with colonization and land ownership in southern Chile.

In 1910, Aldunate represented Chile at the centenary celebrations of Argentine independence in Buenos Aires, addressing the Argentine Congress on behalf of the Chilean Senate.

Under President Arturo Alessandri, he served as Minister of Foreign Affairs, Worship and Colonization from 16 October to 21 December 1922. He returned to the ministry following the 1924 Chilean coup d'état, serving from 12 September 1924 to 23 January 1925 under the Government Junta headed by General Luis Altamirano.

Aldunate also served as a legal delegate for Chile at negotiations held in Washington, D.C., concerning the Tacna–Arica dispute between Chile and Peru.

He was a member of the Academy of Political and Social Science in Philadelphia. Aldunate died in Santiago on 14 June 1931.
