= Juan Luis Maurás =

Chilean lawyer and politician

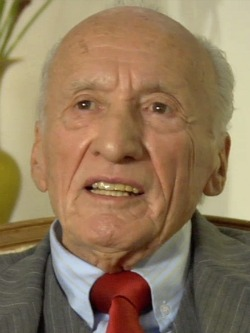

President of the Senate
- In office 3 August 1966 – 16 August 1966
- Preceded by: Tomás Reyes Vicuña
- Succeeded by: Tomás Reyes Vicuña

Member of the Senate
- In office 15 May 1961 – 15 May 1969

President of the Chamber of Deputies
- In office 6 April 1958 – 26 October 1958
- Preceded by: Héctor Correa
- Succeeded by: Raúl Juliet

Member of the Chamber of Deputies
- In office 23 May 1956 – 15 May 1961
- Preceded by: José Zárate Andreu
- In office 15 May 1949 – 15 May 1953

Personal details
- Born: 18 June 1922 Santiago, Chile
- Died: 22 November 2017 (aged 95) Antofagasta, Chile
- Party: Radical Party (1937–1967); National Party (1968–1973)
- Education: University of Chile (LL.B)
- Occupation: Politician
- Profession: Lawyer

Juan Luis Maurás (18 June 1922 – 22 November 2017) was a Chilean lawyer and politician who was President of the Senate (1966) and the Chamber of Deputies (1958).

Maurás died on 22 November 2017 in Antofagasta, aged 95.

== Family and early life ==
The son of Julio Guillermo Maurás and Judith Novella Montagner, he was born in Santiago, Chile, on Sunday, 18 June 1922, into a family with deep roots in the historical tradition of Chilean radicalism.

As Senator Maurás stated that was his father who introduced him at an early age to the Radical Party of Chile. He stated that from around 1937 he had been a Radical, remained so throughout his life, and described himself as a committed Radical who had "suffered for being a Radical".

== Education and professional life ==
He completed his secondary education at the Instituto Nacional and later entered the School of Law of the University of Chile, where, like many politicians of his generation, he deepened his involvement in political life.

From an early age, his professional development was closely linked to political activity. As a young supporter, he began by pasting posters for the presidential campaign of Pedro Aguirre Cerda. The following year, he was hired as a civil servant at the Office of the Comptroller General of the Republic, working in the Division of Legal Review and Registration.

Subsequently, the Comptroller at the time, Agustín Vigorena Rivera, assigned him on secondment to the Caja de Crédito Hipotecario, where he served as private secretary to the institution's president, Juan Antonio Ríos. When Ríos was later elected President of the Republic, Maurás remained at his side, becoming a privileged witness to the second Radical administration.

Following the death of President Ríos, which prematurely ended his term, Maurás travelled to the World Youth Congress held in London in 1946 as president of the Chilean delegation. The following year, he attended the World Student Congress in Prague as a delegate.

== Political career ==
He was elected to the Chamber of Deputies of Chile in the parliamentary elections of 1949, 1953, and 1957, and later elected to the Senate of Chile in the parliamentary elections of March 1961.

In August 1966, following a closely contested vote on the Senate floor and acting against the instructions of his party, he was elected President of the Senate. This episode led to his expulsion from the Radical Party, in which he had militated for nearly three decades, an experience he later associated with his statement that he had "suffered for being a Radical".

Without party backing, he lost the presidency of the Senate in less than two weeks. That same year, he joined the Independent Parliamentary Committee. He remained in that status until April 1968, when he joined the National Party.

In the parliamentary elections of 2 March 1969, he lost his seat in the Senate. Following this defeat, he withdrew from active political life.
