= José Antonio Errázuriz =

Chilean priest and political figure

José Antonio de Errázuriz y Madariaga (September 14, 1747 – October 29, 1821) was a Chilean priest and political figure. He served as President of the Senate of Chile in 1814. José Antonio Errázuriz was of Basque descent.

Errázuriz was born in Santiago, the son of Francisco Javier de Errázuriz y Larraín and of María Loreto de Madariaga. He became a lawyer on April 18, 1768 and was later ordained as a priest in 1770. After the death of Bishop José Martínez de Aldunate, he was named capitular vicar (apostolic caretaker) of the Santiago diocese, position he held until his death. As such, he actively participated in the independence movement in Chile.

In March 1814, he was elected President of the Consultive Senate of Chile, and remained as such until the closing of the sessions in July 1814, when the Spanish "reconquista" dissolved the domestic institutions. He died in the city of Santiago on 1821, at the age of 74. He was uncle of President Fernando Errázuriz Aldunate.

Political offices
Preceded by Pedro de Vivar	President of the Consultive Senate of Chile; 1814	Succeeded by José Ignacio Cienfuegos
