= Benjamín Prado Casas =

Chilean politician (1926–2022)

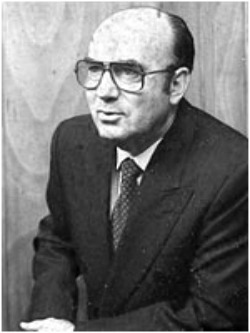

President of the Christian Democratic Party
- In office 1970–1971
- Preceded by: Jaime Castillo Velasco
- Succeeded by: Narciso Irureta

Member of the Senate of Chile
- In office 21 May 1965 – 21 September 1973
- Preceded by: Radomiro Tomic
- Succeeded by: position abolished
- Constituency: Aconcagua Province, Valparaíso Province

Personal details
- Born: 4 January 1926; Valparaíso, Chile
- Died: 7 March 2022 (aged 96); Concón, Chile
- Political party: PDC
- Education: University of Chile

Benjamín Prado Casas (4 January 1926 – 7 March 2022) was a Chilean politician. A member of the Christian Democratic Party, he served in the Senate of Chile from 1965 to 1973. He died in Concón on 7 March 2022, at the age of 96.
