= Nicolás Marambio =

Chilean politician

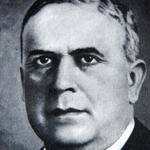

President of the Senate
- In office 15 May 1934 – June 1935
- Preceded by: Ignacio Urrutia Manzano
- Succeeded by: Ignacio Urrutia Manzano

Personal details
- Born: 13 June 1886 Freirina, Chile
- Died: 28 July 1936 (aged 50) Santiago, Chile
- Party: Radical Party
- Spouse: Amaranta Jaramillo Aguirre
- Children: Five
- Parent(s): Tomás Marambio; Nicolasa Montt
- Education: University of Chile (LL.B)
- Occupation: Politician
- Profession: Lawyer

Nicolás Marambio Montt (13 June 1886 – 28 June 1936) was a Chilean politician and lawyer who served as President of the Senate of Chile.

== Biography ==
He was born in the former mining settlement of San Juan (Quebradita), Freirina, on 13 June 1886, son of Tomás Marambio and Nicolasa Montt, writer and translator.

He married Amaranta Jaramillo Aguirre, and they had five children: María, Hernán, Gustavo, Eliana and Fernando Javier.

He studied at the Liceo de La Serena between 1900 and 1905 and, after obtaining his bachelor’s degree, entered the Law course at the Universidad del Estado, now the University of Chile. He was admitted to the bar on 28 May 1910; his thesis was titled Algunas consideraciones sobre el régimen legal de aguas.

He practiced law in La Serena, specializing in Mining Law, and collaborated in the press with articles of general interest.

He was member of the Radical Party and presided over it on several occasions at the provincial level in La Serena, directing electoral campaigns of the La Serena, Elqui and Coquimbo grouping from 1915 onward.

In 1915 he was elected councilor (regidor) of the Municipality of La Serena and later first mayor in 1920. During his municipal administration he promoted the territorial expansion of La Serena and worked toward communal paving projects.

He died in Santiago on 28 June 1936, without completing his parliamentary term.

== Activities ==
He was president of the Sociedad de Artesanos de La Serena and president of the Sociedad Nacional de Minería (SONAMI) between October 1934 and June 1936, having joined its board in 1926.
