= María Flora Yáñez =

Chilean writer

- Born: María Flora Yáñez Bianchi; September 1898; Chile
- Died: April 7, 1982 (aged 83); Chile
- Occupation: Writer
- Years active: 1954–1982
- Children: Alfonso Echevarría, Mónica Echeverría
- Father: Eliodoro Yáñez
- Awards: Atenea Award (1947); Santiago Municipal Literature Award (1952)

María Flora Yáñez Bianchi (September 1898 – 7 April 1982) was a Chilean writer who worked in the novel and short story genres, for which she received the University of Concepción's Atenea Award in 1947 and the Santiago Municipal Literature Award in 1952.

== Biography ==
María Flora Yáñez's father was Eliodoro Yáñez, the Chilean politician and founder of La Nación. Her children were also writers, Alfonso Echevarría (1922–1969) and Mónica Echeverría (1920-2020).

Her literary work is part of the trend in women's literature of her time, "which is ascribed to the autobiographical and personal form," among which are the works of Marta Brunet (1901), María Luisa Bombal (1910) and María Carolina Geel (1911). She is included in a group of students assigned to the "Subjectivist School" present not only in Chilean women's literature, but also in the women's contemporary novel.

Some of her texts such as Espejo sin imagen (1936), Icha (1945), Aguas obsuras (1945), Juan Estrella (1954), and Gertrudis (1954) are cataloged as a kind of "autobiographical fiction in the first person". Regarding one of her first publications, El abrazo de la tierra (1933), Lucía Guerra-Cunningham includes it within those texts referring to the women's liberation movement, because it treats marriage as synonymous with "mortal boredom", a sacrament that at the beginning of the 20th century was associated with the conservative ideology of Chilean society.

Yáñez also wrote for several magazines and newspapers, including El Mercurio, El Diario Ilustrado, and Atenea.

== Works ==
- El abrazo de la tierra (1933)
- Mundo en sombra (1935)
- Espejo sin imagen (novel, 1936)
- Visiones de infancia (1947)
- Las cenizas (novel, 1949)
- La piedra (novel, 1952)
- El estanque (short stories, Ediciones La Semana Literaria, 1945 and 1954)
- Visiones de infancia (1960)
- ¿Dónde está el trigo y el vino? (1962)
- Otra comarca (1963)
- El último faro (1967)
- Juan Estrella (1970)
- El peldaño (1974)
- Historia de mi vida: fragmentos (Nascimento, 1980)
