= Fernando Lazcano Echaurren =

Chilean lawyer and politician (1848–1920)

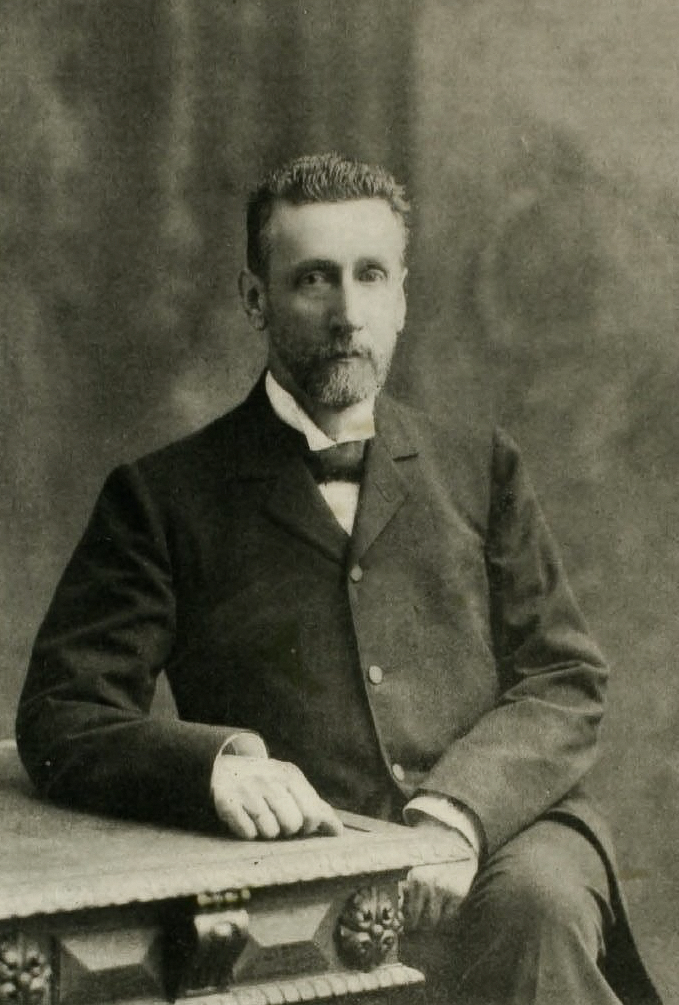

President of the Senate of Chile
- In office 8 September 1919 – 30 August 1920
- Preceded by: Ismael Tocornal
- Succeeded by: Ismael Tocornal

President of the Senate of Chile
- In office 2 June 1897 – 5 June 1906
- Preceded by: Ramón Barros Luco
- Succeeded by: Juan Luis Sanfuentes

Member of the Senate
- In office 1894 – 30 August 1920
- Constituency: Curicó Province

Member of the Chamber of Deputies
- In office 15 April 1891 – 18 August 1891
- Constituency: Santiago
- In office 1873–1879
- Constituency: Curicó

Personal details
- Born: 23 July 1848 Santiago, Chile
- Died: 30 August 1920 (aged 72) Santiago, Chile
- Party: Liberal Party
- Spouse: Emilia Errázuriz Echaurren
- Children: 7
- Parent(s): Fernando Lazcano Mujica; Dolores Echaurren Larraín
- Education: University of Chile (LL.B)
- Profession: Lawyer; Farmer

Fernando Liborio Lazcano Echaurren (23 July 1848 – 30 August 1920) was a Chilean lawyer, farmer and politician who served as a member of the Chamber of Deputies of Chile, as a senator for Curicó Province, and as President of the Senate of Chile.

A member of the Liberal Party, Lazcano represented Curicó in Congress for much of his political career. He served continuously in the Senate from 1894 until his death in 1920 and was a candidate for the presidency of Chile in 1906.

== Early life ==
Lazcano was born in Santiago on 23 July 1848 to Fernando Lazcano Mujica and Dolores Echaurren Larraín. He studied humanities at Colegio San Ignacio and the Instituto Nacional, before studying law at the University of Chile. He qualified as a lawyer on 30 December 1871.

On 8 April 1873, he married Emilia Errázuriz Echaurren, with whom he had seven children. Outside politics, Lazcano was a farmer and owned agricultural estates in Curicó Province.

== Political career ==
A member of the Liberal Party, Lazcano was elected substitute deputy for Curicó for the 1873–1876 parliamentary period. He subsequently became the constituency's full representative after the elected deputy, Guillermo Matta Goyenechea, opted to represent Ovalle instead.

Lazcano was reelected as full deputy for Curicó for the 1876–1879 term, taking his seat on 8 August 1876.

During the 1891 Chilean Civil War, he was elected deputy for Santiago to the Constituent Congress, serving from 15 April to 18 August 1891.

In 1894, Lazcano was elected to the Senate for Curicó Province, beginning a continuous senatorial career that lasted until his death. During his first term, from 1894 to 1900, he served as vice president of the Senate from 4 June 1894 to 27 April 1896 and became president of the chamber on 2 June 1897. He also served on the permanent committees for finance and industry and for education and charity.

Lazcano was reelected senator for Curicó for the 1900–1906 term. He served as provisional president of the Senate on 15 May 1900 and was elected president on 5 June. In 1903, he again served as provisional president before continuing as president of the chamber until 1906. During this period, he was a member of the permanent committee for war and navy.

He was reelected for the 1906–1912 term and served on the permanent committees for government, foreign relations and budgets. He subsequently won another term for 1912–1918, during which he chaired the government committee and also served on the foreign relations, budgets and internal police committees.

Lazcano was elected to a fifth consecutive senatorial term for Curicó for the 1918–1924 period. He served on the permanent committees for government and elections, foreign relations and internal police. On 8 September 1919, he was again elected president of the Senate and remained in the presidency until his death.

In addition to his parliamentary activities, Lazcano was elected by the Senate to three terms as a councillor of the Caja de Crédito Hipotecario. He also served as president of that institution, president of the Banco Español Chile and president of the Sociedad Chilena de Amalgamación.

In 1906, Lazcano was a candidate for President of Chile.

Lazcano died in Santiago on 30 August 1920 while still serving as senator and president of the Senate. According to his parliamentary biography, he died at the National Congress Building while carrying out his legislative duties.
