= Ignacio Urrutia Manzano =

Chilean politician

Ignacio Urrutia
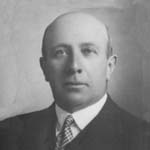

President of the Senate of Chile
- In office 31 May 1933 – 1934
- Preceded by: Alberto Cabero
- Succeeded by: Nicolás Marambio
- In office 1935–1936
- Preceded by: Nicolás Marambio
- Succeeded by: José Maza

Member of the Senate
- In office 15 May 1933 – 15 May 1941
- Constituency: Talca and Maule

Minister of War and Navy
- In office 8 April 1932 – 4 June 1932
- President: Juan Esteban Montero
- Preceded by: Miguel Urrutia
- Succeeded by: Marmaduque Grove

Member of the Chamber of Deputies
- In office 15 May 1926 – 6 June 1932
- Constituency: Loncomilla, Linares and Parral

Personal details
- Born: 1 July 1879 Concepción, Chile
- Died: 8 February 1951 (aged 71) Parral, Chile
- Party: Liberal Party
- Spouse: Luzmila de la Sotta
- Children: Seven
- Parent(s): Luis Urrutia Rozas; Aurora Manzano
- Relatives: Enrique Urrutia Manzano (brother)
- Occupation: Politician
- Profession: Naval officer

Ignacio Urrutia Manzano (1 July 1879 – 8 February 1951) was a Chilean politician. He served twice as President of the Senate of Chile and minister.

He was born in Concepción, the son of Luis Urrutia Rozas and of Aurora Manzano Benavente. He completed his studies in his native city, and then attended the Naval Academy, where he became a naval officer. As such, he was sent to supervise the construction of several ships that were being built at the Armstrong shipyards in Newcastle upon Tyne. He eventually returned to Chile on board the recently completed "Esmeralda". He retired from the navy in 1906 while at the same time renouncing his pension. He married Luzmila de la Sotta Benavente and together they had seven children.

He started his political career as mayor of the city of Parral. He joined the Liberal Party and was elected a deputy for "Loncomilla, Linares and Parral" (1926–1930) and was reelected for the same constituency (1930–1934). President Juan Esteban Montero appointed him Minister of War and Navy, position he held between April 8 and June 4, 1932. His political career was put on hold by the collapse of the second administration of President Montero and the dissolution of the National Congress by a Government Junta; due to the advent of the Socialist Republic of Chile.

He was elected a Senator for "Talca and Maule" (1933–1941) and President of the Senate on May 31, 1933. He was reelected as president of the Senate in 1935. He died in Parral on February 8, 1951 at the age of 71.

== Biography ==
He was born in Concepción on 1 July 1879, son of Luis Urrutia Rozas and Aurora Manzano Benavente. He married Ludmila de la Sotta Benavente, and they had seven children.

He studied at the Liceo de Concepción and later entered the Naval Academy, where he graduated as midshipman. He was commissioned to Europe to supervise the construction of naval vessels for the Chilean fleet at the Armstrong shipyards in Newcastle. He returned to Chile aboard the battleship Esmeralda and carried out geographic explorations through the Magellan channels. He later served as instructor on various ships of the Chilean Navy. Upon his retirement in 1906, he renounced his pension and subsequently devoted himself to agricultural activities on his estates in Parral.

== Political career ==
He began his public career as councillor and later mayor of Parral. He was elected deputy for the 14th Departmental Constituency of "Loncomilla, Linares and Parral" for the period 1926–1930, serving on the Permanent Commission of War and Navy and as substitute member of the Permanent Commission of Finance.

He was reelected for the same constituency for the 1930–1934 period, continuing his work in the Permanent Commission of War and Navy. The revolutionary movement of 4 June 1932 decreed the dissolution of Congress two days later, interrupting his mandate.

President Juan Esteban Montero appointed him Minister of National Defense, serving from 8 April to 4 June 1932, during the final days of his administration.

He was elected senator for the 6th Provincial Grouping of "Talca and Maule" for the period 1933–1941. On 31 May 1933 he was elected President of the Senate, serving until 22 May 1934, and was again elected to that office in 1935. During his senatorial term, he served on the Permanent Commissions of Finance, Commerce and Municipal Loans; and Labor and Social Welfare; and acted as substitute member of the Permanent Commission of Army and Navy. As parliamentarian, he raised preventive observations to the government regarding economic policy matters.

He died in Parral.
