= Eduardo Charme =

Chilean politician (1854–1920)

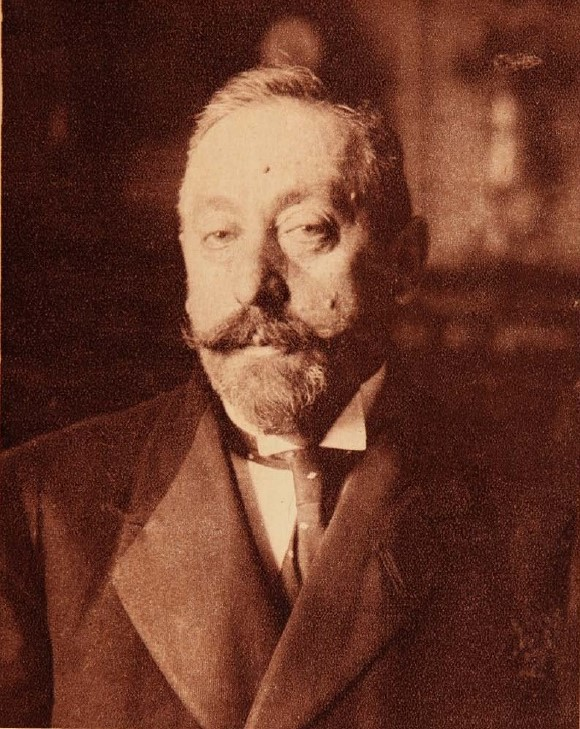

President of the Senate of Chile
- In office 2 June 1915 – 20 May 1918
- Preceded by: Silvestre Ochagavía Echaurren
- Succeeded by: Ismael Tocornal

Member of the Senate
- In office 15 May 1903 – 10 October 1920
- Constituency: Colchagua Province

Minister of the Interior
- In office September 1914 – September 1914
- President: Ramón Barros Luco
- In office 1909–1909
- President: Pedro Montt

Minister of Industry and Public Works
- In office 18 September 1906 – 1909
- President: Pedro Montt
- In office 18 September 1901 – 18 September 1906
- President: Germán Riesco

Personal details
- Born: 8 October 1854 Talca, Chile
- Died: 10 October 1920 (aged 66) Santiago, Chile
- Party: Liberal Party
- Spouse: Amelia Prieto
- Parent(s): Augusto Charme de L'Isle; Beatriz Fernández Valenzuela
- Education: Instituto Nacional
- Profession: Physician

Eduardo Charme Fernández (8 October 1854 – 10 October 1920) was a Chilean medical doctor, businessman and politician who served as a member of the Senate of Chile for Colchagua Province from 1903 until his death in 1920.

He was president of the Senate between 1915 and 1918 and held ministerial positions under presidents Germán Riesco, Pedro Montt and Ramón Barros Luco.

== Early life ==
Charme was born in Talca on 8 October 1854, the son of Augusto Charme de L'Isle, an engineer educated at the École Polytechnique, and Beatriz Fernández Valenzuela. He attended the Liceo de San Fernando before completing his secondary education at the Instituto Nacional. He subsequently studied medicine in Santiago and qualified as a physician on 18 August 1877.

While working as a physician in the nitrate-producing region of northern Chile, Charme temporarily replaced army surgeons during the War of the Pacific. In 1885, he left medical practice and entered the nitrate industry in Tarapacá Province, becoming the owner of the Amelia, Josefina and Santiago nitrate works.

Charme later moved to central Chile and became involved in agriculture, owning properties in the provinces of Colchagua, Curicó and O'Higgins. He married Amelia Prieto Muñoz.

== Political career ==
A member of the Liberal Party, Charme entered parliamentary politics in 1903 when he was elected to the Senate for Colchagua Province for the 1903–1909 term. He was reelected for the same constituency in 1909 and again in 1915, giving him continuous representation in the Senate until his death in 1920.

During his parliamentary career, Charme participated in several Senate committees. In his first term, he served on committees dealing with worship and colonization, war and navy, and the national budget. He was also involved in the committee for industry and public works during the 1906–1909 legislative period.

Charme combined his senatorial career with several appointments to the cabinet. During the presidency of Germán Riesco, he served as Minister of Industry and Public Works and temporarily assumed responsibility for the public instruction portfolio while its incumbent minister was on leave. President Pedro Montt retained him as Minister of Industry when his administration began in 1906 and later appointed him Minister of the Interior in 1909.

Under President Ramón Barros Luco, Charme returned briefly to the Interior Ministry in September 1914.

In 1915, Charme was reelected to the Senate for a third consecutive term. He initially served as provisional president of the chamber from 15 May until 2 June 1915, when he was elected president of the Senate. He held the presidency until 20 May 1918. During this legislative period, he was also a member of the Senate's internal police committee.

Within the Liberal Party, Charme served as a member of its executive board. He was also appointed to the Council of State.

Charme remained a senator until his death in Santiago on 10 October 1920, two days after his 66th birthday.
