= Francisco Valdés Vergara =

Chilean politician

Federico Valdés Vergara
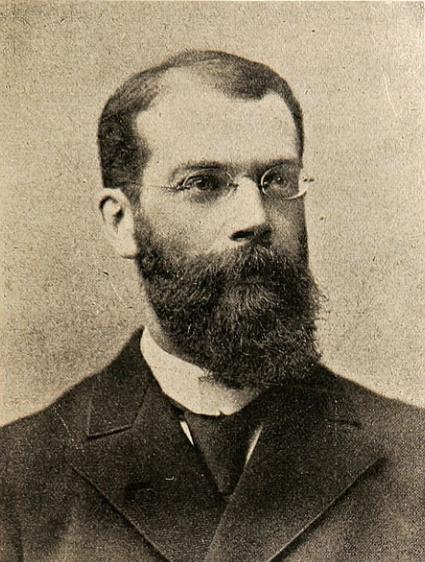

President of the Senate of the Republic of Chile
- In office 3 June 1912 – 14 October 1913
- Preceded by: Ricardo Matte
- Succeeded by: Carlos Aldunate Solar

Personal details
- Born: 8 October 1854 Santiago, Chile
- Died: 10 October 1920 (aged 66) Valparaíso, Chile
- Party: Liberal Party
- Education: University of Chile
- Occupation: Politician
- Profession: Historian

Francisco Valdés Vergara (4 October 1854 – 15 May 1916) was a Chilean politician and historian who served as President of the Senate of Chile.
