= Waldo Silva =

Chilean politician

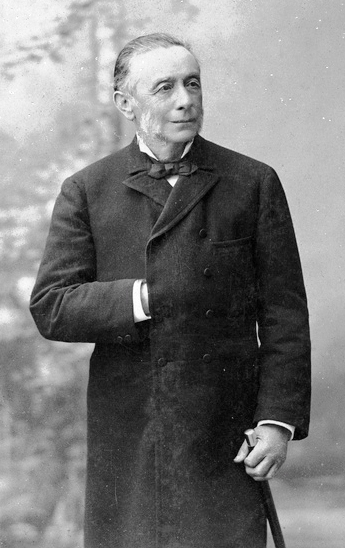

President of the Senate
- In office 4 November 1891 – 10 November 1892
- Preceded by: Adolfo Eastman
- Succeeded by: Agustín Edwards Ross

Personal details
- Born: 1 January 1820 Santiago, Chile
- Died: 10 November 1892 (aged 72) Santiago, Chile
- Education: University of Chile (LL.B)
- Occupation: Politician
- Profession: Lawyer

Waldo Silva Algüe (born 1820–10 November 1892) was a Chilean politician and lawyer who served as President of the Senate of Chile.
