= Pedro de Vivar =

Chilean priest and politician

Fr. Pedro de Vivar y Ruiz de Azúa (1742–1820) was a Chilean priest and political figure. He served as the first President of the Senate of Chile in 1812.

Vivar was born in Santiago, the son of José de Melchor de Vivar y de la Rocha and Juana Ruiz de Azúa y Amasa Yturgoyen. He studied Theology at the Universidad Real de San Felipe, where he got a doctorate, and was later ordained as a priest. Vivar actively participated in the independence movement in Chile. On October 31, 1812, he was elected the first President of the Consultive Senate of Chile, and remained as such until the closing of the sessions in January 1814, when the Spanish "reconquista" dissolved the domestic institutions. He died in the city of Santiago on 1820, at the age of 78.

Political offices
Preceded by None	President of the Senate of Chile; 1812–1814	Succeeded by José Antonio Errázuriz
