= Adolfo Eastman =

Chilean politician (1835–1908)

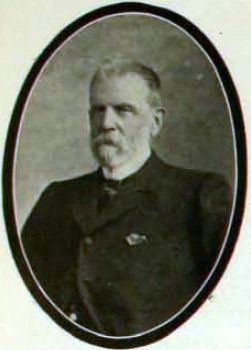

Member of the Senate
- In office 1897 – 9 August 1908
- Constituency: Coquimbo Province

President of the Senate of Chile
- In office 20 April 1891 – August 1891
- Preceded by: Pedro Vicente Reyes
- Succeeded by: Waldo Silva

Member of the Senate
- In office 15 April 1891 – 18 August 1891
- Constituency: Colchagua Province

Member of the Senate
- In office 1885–1888
- Constituency: Colchagua Province

Member of the Senate
- In office 14 September 1882 – 1885

Member of the Chamber of Deputies
- In office 17 October 1876 – 1882
- Constituency: Limache

Member of the Chamber of Deputies
- In office 1867–1870
- Constituency: Quillota

Member of the Chamber of Deputies
- In office 1864–1867
- Constituency: Ovalle

Personal details
- Born: 28 October 1835 Ovalle, Chile
- Died: 9 August 1908 (aged 72) Santiago, Chile
- Party: Liberal Party; Liberal Democratic Party
- Spouse(s): Manuela Urmeneta Quiroga; María del Carmen Mackenna Serrano
- Children: 1
- Parent(s): Edmundo Eastman White; Tomasa Quiroga Darrigrande
- Profession: Mining engineer

Adolfo Eastman Quiroga (28 October 1835 – 9 August 1908) was a Chilean mining engineer, businessman and politician who served as a member of the Chamber of Deputies of Chile and the Senate of Chile, and as President of the Senate of Chile.

Initially a member of the Liberal Party, Eastman later joined the Liberal Democratic Party. His parliamentary career extended from 1864 until his death in 1908, with several intervals outside Congress.

== Early life ==
Eastman was born in Ovalle, Chile, on 28 October 1835 to Edmundo Eastman White and Tomasa Quiroga Darrigrande.

He was educated in England, where in 1848 he undertook advanced commercial studies. In 1852, he moved to Germany and studied at the School of Mines of Saxony, qualifying as a mining engineer in 1856.

On 10 July 1858, Eastman married Manuela Urmeneta Quiroga. He married his second wife, María del Carmen Mackenna Serrano, in 1884. They had one daughter, who died a few months after her birth.

== Mining and business career ==
Eastman worked as a mining administrator and mine owner and served as the second administrator of the Tamaya mines.

On 30 December 1863, together with José Tomás Urmeneta, he founded the Eighth Company of the Fire Department of Santiago, serving as its first director and as a volunteer firefighter.

He was appointed an interim councillor of the Caja de Crédito Hipotecario on 5 March 1891 and later served as a councillor of state from 1897 to 1898.

== Political career ==
Eastman began his parliamentary career as a member of the Liberal Party. He was elected full deputy for Ovalle for the 1864–1867 parliamentary period.

He was subsequently elected full deputy for Quillota for the 1867–1870 term. He was simultaneously elected substitute deputy for Vallenar, but opted to represent Quillota, where he had been elected as a full deputy.

After an interval outside Congress, Eastman was elected full deputy for Limache for the 1876–1879 parliamentary period. He did not take his seat until 17 October 1876; during his absence, Domingo Gana Cruz served as his substitute. Eastman was reelected for Limache for the 1879–1882 term.

In 1882, Eastman was elected to the Senate for a three-year term as a substitute for José Victorino Lastarria, who was serving on a diplomatic mission. He entered the Senate on 14 September 1882 and served on the permanent committee for finance and industry.

In 1885, he was elected senator for Colchagua Province for another three-year term, serving as a substitute for Jovino Novoa Vidal. During this term, he served as a substitute member of the permanent committees for finance and industry and for education and charity.

During the 1891 Chilean Civil War, Eastman served as senator for Colchagua in the Constituent Congress from 15 April to 18 August 1891. He was provisional president of the Senate from 15 to 20 April and subsequently president of the Senate from 20 April until August 1891.

Eastman later joined the Liberal Democratic Party. In 1896, he was a candidate for the presidency of Chile.

He returned to the Senate after being elected senator for Coquimbo Province for the 1897–1903 parliamentary period. He served on the permanent committee for government and foreign relations and, after the committee was divided, remained a member of the government committee. He later also served on the permanent committee for education and charity.

Eastman was reelected senator for Coquimbo for the 1903–1909 parliamentary period and served on the permanent committee for budgets. He died before completing his term; as less than a year remained before its scheduled expiration, no supplementary election was held.

Eastman died in Santiago on 9 August 1908, aged 72.
