= Juan Emar =

Chilean writer, artist and critic (1893–1964)

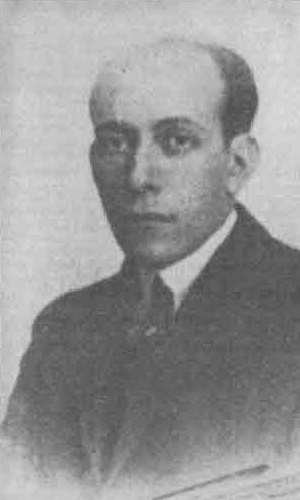
Portrait of Juan Emar

Juan Emar is the pen name of the Chilean writer, artist and critic Álvaro Yáñez Bianchi (1893–1964). He was the son of politician, lawyer and journalist Eliodoro Yáñez. In Paris, he associated with the avant-garde artists of the Dadaist and Surrealist movements. He published four books between 1935 and 1937 – Un año, Miltín, Ayer and Diez – but was met with critical indifference. His works were rediscovered after his death, and his reputation has grown in recent decades as a precursor of modernist literature in Latin America. He split his time between Santiago and Paris.

Ayer has been published in English translation by Peirene Press. His magnum opus Umbral, which totals over 4,000 pages in the Spanish edition, remains untranslated.

The pseudonym Juan Emar derives from the French phrase "J'en ai marre", meaning "I'm fed up".

== Works ==
- 1935 Ayer (novel)
- 1935 Miltín 1934 (novel)
- 1935 Un año [One Year] (novel)
- 1937 Diez (stories)
- 1977-96 Umbral (novel)
- 1988 Serie de los ventrudos mandibulares (sketches)
- 1992 Jean Emar. Escritos de Arte (1923-1925)
- 1999 Cartas a Carmen. Correspondencia entre Juan Emar y Carmen Yáñez (1957- 1963)
- 2003 Notas de arte: Jean Emar en La Nación: 1923-1927
- 2006 Mi vida: diarios 1911-1917
- 2007 Cartas a Pépèche
- 2011 Don Urbano (sketches)
- 2014 Cavilaciones (essays)
- 2014 Amor (novel)
- 2017 Diarios de viaje (travel)
- 2017 Regreso (novel)
