= Radomiro Tomic mine =

Mine in Chile

Radormiro Tomic
- Location in Chile Radomiro Tomic (Chile)
- Location: Antofagasta Region, Chile; 22°13′S 68°54′W
- Products: Copper
- Production: ▼270.5 kTon copper
- Financial year: 2024
- Opened: 1995
- Company: Codelco

The Radomiro Tomic mine is an open pit mine that extracts copper oxide minerals at 3,000 meters (9,800 ft) above sea level in the Andes Mountains near to Chuquicamata mine and Calama in northern Chile's Antofagasta Region. Since at least 2001 the mine has had consistently an annual production of over 260 kTon copper per year. Production in Radomiro Tomic peaked in 2011 with 470.1 kTon copper that year being at the time Chile's second most productive copper mine. In 2024 the mine ranked as Chile's 6th most productive copper mine.

Although this deposit was discovered in the 1950s, its operations started only in 1995, after Codelco updated the feasibility studies for its exploitation and acquired the technology necessary to exploit it profitably.

Today, Chilean Copper Corporation (Codelco) controls the mine. Until 1999, Radomiro Tomic was referred to as "Codelco Chile Division Radomiro Tomić", since then, (Codelco) has renamed it "Codelco Norte". The mine is named after Christian Democratic politician Radomiro Tomic. Before that the mine was also known as Pampa Norte.
