= Hernán Videla Lira =

Chilean politician

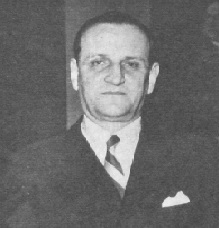

President of the Senate of Chile
- In office 28 November 1958 – 10 May 1962
- Preceded by: Guillermo Pérez de Arce
- Succeeded by: Hugo Zepeda Barrios

Member of the Senate of Chile
- In office 15 May 1941 – 15 May 1965
- Constituency: 2nd Provincial Agrupation (Atacama and Coquimbo)

Personal details
- Born: 19 May 1903 Santiago, Chile
- Died: 22 September 1982 (aged 79) Buenos Aires, Argentina
- Party: Liberal Party
- Spouse(s): Luz Pacheco; Laura Edwards Puelma; Teodora Escurra
- Occupation: Politician

Hernán Videla Lira (born 19 May 1903 – 22 September 1982) was a Chilean politician and entrepreneur who served as President of the Senate of Chile. The copper smelter Fundición Hernán Videla Lira near Copiapó is named after him. From 1937 to 1965 he was president of the National Mining Society (SONAMI).
