= Ismael Tocornal =

Chilean politician (1850–1929)

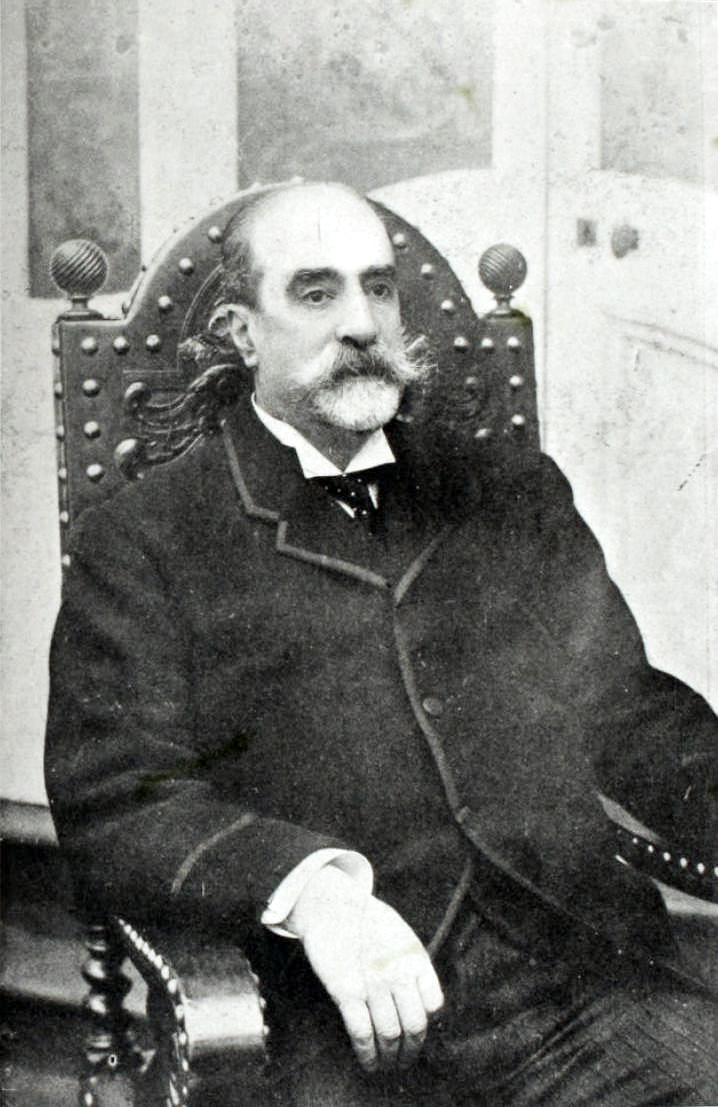

President of the Central Bank of Chile
- In office 1925 – 6 October 1929
- Preceded by: Position established
- Succeeded by: Emiliano Figueroa

Minister of the Interior
- In office 3 November 1921 – 1 April 1922
- President: Arturo Alessandri
- In office 14 July 1917 – 29 September 1917
- President: Juan Luis Sanfuentes
- In office 23 January 1912 – 20 May 1912
- President: Ramón Barros Luco
- In office 31 May 1910 – 17 June 1910
- President: Pedro Montt
- In office 15 September 1909 – 20 May 1910
- President: Pedro Montt
- In office 18 November 1901 – 6 May 1902
- President: Germán Riesco

President of the Senate of Chile
- In office 2 September 1920 – 5 October 1920
- Preceded by: Fernando Lazcano Echaurren
- In office 3 June 1918 – 8 September 1919
- Preceded by: Eduardo Charme
- Succeeded by: Fernando Lazcano Echaurren

Member of the Senate
- In office 15 May 1915 – 15 May 1921
- Constituency: Ñuble Province

Minister of Industry and Public Works
- In office 18 September 1901 – 18 November 1901
- President: Germán Riesco

Member of the Chamber of Deputies
- In office 15 May 1897 – 15 May 1900
- Constituency: Cauquenes and Constitución
- In office 1891–1894
- Constituency: La Victoria and Melipilla
- In office 1882–1885
- Constituency: La Victoria

Personal details
- Born: 5 April 1850 Santiago, Chile
- Died: 6 October 1929 (aged 79) Santiago, Chile
- Party: Radical Party
- Spouses: Leonor Cazotte (div.); Josefina Matte
- Children: 2
- Parent(s): Manuel Tocornal; Mercedes Tocornal
- Education: Instituto Nacional; Colegio San Ignacio
- Profession: Lawyer

Ismael Tocornal y Tocornal, GCMG (April 5, 1850 - October 6, 1929) was a Chilean politician and diplomat, and the first Governor of the Central Bank of Chile.

He was born in Santiago, the son of Manuel Antonio Tocornal y Grez and of Mercedes Ignacia Tocornal y Velasco. He completed his studies in the Colegio San Ignacio and at the Instituto Nacional. Trucco then attended the University of Chile, where he graduated as a lawyer on June 20, 1873. Early in his life he dedicated most of his time to his Hacienda San José in Puente Alto. Ismael Tocornal married Leonor Cazotte y Alcalde, and together they had one son. After the death of his first wife, he married a second time with Josefina Matte y Pérez, and they had one son, Domingo Tocornal Matte.

Tocornal joined the Radical Party of Chile and he was elected supplementary deputy for "La Victoria" (1879-1882), and reelected, this time as proprietary deputy for the same area (1882-1885). In 1891 was elected deputy for "Melipilla and La Victoria" (1891-1894) and in 1897 deputy for "Cauquenes and Constitución" (1897-1900). He was elected President of the Chamber of deputies on June 9, 1897, position he held until July 2, 1898.

President Germán Riesco appointed him Minister of Industry and Public Works, position he held from September 18, 1901 until November 18 of the same year, when he was reappointed as Minister of the Interior, until May 6, 1902. President Pedro Montt appointed him again as Minister of the Interior between September 15, 1909 and June 17, 1910, same as Presidents Ramón Barros Luco between January 23 and May 20, 1912; Juan Luis Sanfuentes between July 14 and September 11, 1917 and Arturo Alessandri between November 3, 1921 and March 22, 1922.

In 1915, Tocornal was elected a Senator for "Ñuble" (1915-1921). On June 3, 1918 was elected President of the Senate, position he held until September 8, 1919. In 1919 he was designated as Especial Ambassador to the United Kingdom and headed the delegation that returned the courtesy visit of Especial Ambassador Maurice de Bunsen. During that visit, King George V appointed him Knight Grand Cross (GCMG) of the Order of St Michael and St George.

In 1920, he was part of the tribunal of honor that decided the result of the presidential election between Arturo Alessandri and Luis Barros Borgoño. On June 26, 1922 he was once again elected as a Senator, this time for "Santiago", where he remained until 1924. At the creation of the Central Bank of Chile in 1925, Tocornal was appointed its first Governor, a position he retained until his death in Santiago in 1929, at the age of 79.
