= Tomás Reyes Vicuña =

Chilean politician

Tomás Reyes
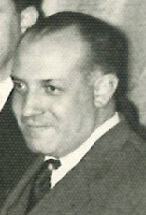

President of the Senate of Chile
- In office 17 August 1966 – 27 December 1966
- Preceded by: Juan Luis Maurás
- Succeeded by: Salvador Allende
- In office 1 June 1965 – 3 August 1966
- Preceded by: Hermes Ahumada (Provisional)
- Succeeded by: Juan Luis Maurás

Member of the Senate of Chile
- In office 15 May 1965 – 11 May 1973
- Succeeded by: Eduardo Frei Montalva
- Constituency: 4th Departamental Agrupation (Santiago)

Member of the Chamber of Deputies of Chile
- In office 15 May 1949 – 15 May 1965
- Constituency: 7th Departamental Agrupation (Santiago)

Intendant of Santiago
- In office 1944–1947

Personal details
- Born: 6 October 1914 Santiago, Chile
- Died: 6 January 1986 (aged 71) Santiago, Chile
- Party: National Falange; Christian Democratic Party
- Spouse: Raquel Vergara Mackenna
- Children: Six
- Parent(s): Tomás Reyes Prieto; Ana Luisa Vicuña
- Education: Pontifical Catholic University of Chile
- Occupation: Politician
- Profession: Architect

José Tomás Reyes Vicuña (6 October 1914 – 6 January 1986) was a Chilean politician and architect who served as President of the Senate of Chile.

== Professional Development ==
In the professional area, he had an outstanding career with several public competitions, winning bids for constructions such as the Consistorial of the Municipality of Ñuñoa, the Padre Hurtado exercise house, the San Ignacio School on Pocuro Avenue, among others. He performed essential works in residential neighbourhoods, the Banco de Chile, Los Leones, the Balneario de Tejas Verdes, and private residences in the capital, Concepción and Chillán.

He was also vital abroad, as in the conception and execution of the Loyola Novitiate in Panama. On the other hand, he dedicated himself to agricultural activities in the family estate "El Rancho de San José" in the Colchagua area.
