= Américo Acuña =

Chilean politician

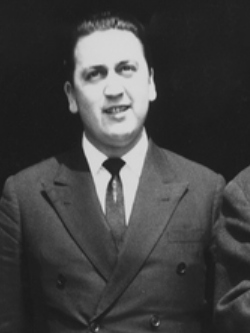

President of the Senate of Chile
- In office 12 May 1973 – 23 May 1973
- Preceded by: José Ignacio Palma
- Succeeded by: Eduardo Frei Montalva

Member of the Senate of Chile
- In office 15 May 1969 – 11 September 1973
- Succeeded by: Dissolution of the charge (1973 Coup d'état)
- Constituency: 7th Provincial Agrupation

Member of the Chamber of Deputies of Chile
- In office 1961–1969
- Constituency: 23rd Departamental Agrupation

Personal details
- Born: 2 January 1934 (age 92) Río Negro, Chile
- Party: Radical Party; Radical Left Party
- Spouse: Ruby Winckler
- Children: Two
- Parent(s): Arturo Acuña González; Edelmira Rosas Rosas
- Education: University of Chile (LL.B)
- Occupation: Politician
- Profession: Lawyer

Américo Arturo Acuña Rosas (born 2 January 1934) is a Chilean former politician and lawyer who served as President of the Senate of Chile.

He began his political activities during his time as a High school student, in which he was president of the Alumni Center of his Lyceum. Later, he joined the Radical Party of Chile in 1948, where he held positions such as leader of the Radical Youth of Osorno, assembly leader, provincial leader, national councilor or national leader.

On 3 August 1971, Acuña resigned to his party due to its alliance with Salvador Allende's Marxist government. Thus, he joined the Radical Left Party (PIR).

He collaborated in the newspaper «La Prensa» of Osorno, writing many articles. Similarly, he founded the magazine «Radix» and freely practiced his profession.

== Early life ==
Born in 1934 at Osorno, he was educated at the Liceo Eleuterio Ramírez.

Later, he joined the University of Chile School of Law, where he obtained his Bachelor of Arts a degree thesis entitled «Political and Economic Background of the Constitutional Reform in 1934», which content had as context to Arturo Alessandri Palma's second government (1932−1938).

== Political career ==
=== As Deputy ===
In 1961, Acuña gained a seat in the Chamber of Deputies representing the 23rd Departmental Group of his hometown Osorno and Río Negro for the period 1961−1965. In the Congress, he was a member of the Permanent commission on Public Education, the Special Commission on US Dollar (1962) and the Investigative Commission of Television and Automotive Industry (1965).

In 1963, he participated in Parliamentary Congresses in Buenos Aires whilst Argentina was governed by Arturo Umberto Illia. By the other hand, in 1965, Acuña participed in meetings with the governments of United States and Puerto Rico.

In 1965, he was reelected deputy for the same Departmental Group for the period 1965−1969. Now he was member of the Special Investigative Commission on the Problem of the National Merchant Marine (1967).

=== As Senator ===
In 1969, Acuña reached a seat in the Senate representing the 9th Provincial Group of Valdivia, Osorno and Llanquihue for the period 1969−1977. From 1969 to 1971, he was a member of the Parliamentary Committee of his Party until his resignation.

In the 1971 Conference of the Inter-Parliamentary Union, he served as president of the Chilean Delegation.

In 1973, Acuña was the provisional president of the Senate for a week. On 23 May, he was replaced in the position by Eduardo Frei Montalva, former President of the Republic (1964–70).

He also was a substitute Senator in the Permanent Commissions of government, Constitution, Legislation, Justice, Regulation, Public Education, Finance, Public Works, Social Security, Agriculture and Colonization.

== Retirement from politics ==
In 2011, he was honoured by Sebastián Piñera's first government due to his labour as President of the Senate.
