= Guillermo Pérez de Arce =

Chilean politician

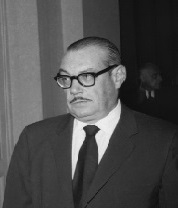

President of the Senate
- In office 8 April 1958 – 26 November 1958
- Preceded by: Fernando Alessandri Rodríguez
- Succeeded by: Hernán Videla Lira

Member of the Senate of Chile
- In office 15 May 1953 – 15 May 1961
- Constituency: 5th Provincial Agrupation

Personal details
- Born: 3 October 1906 Santiago, Chile
- Died: 10 June 1994 (aged 87) Santiago, Chile
- Political party: Agrarian Labor Party; Liberal Party
- Spouse: Virginia Letelier
- Occupation: Politician

Guillermo Pérez de Arce Plummer (3 October 1906 – 10 June 1994) was a Chilean politician and entrepreneur who served as President of the Senate of Chile.
