= Eduardo Frei Montalva =

President of Chile From 1964 to 1970

Eduardo Frei Montalva OMCh
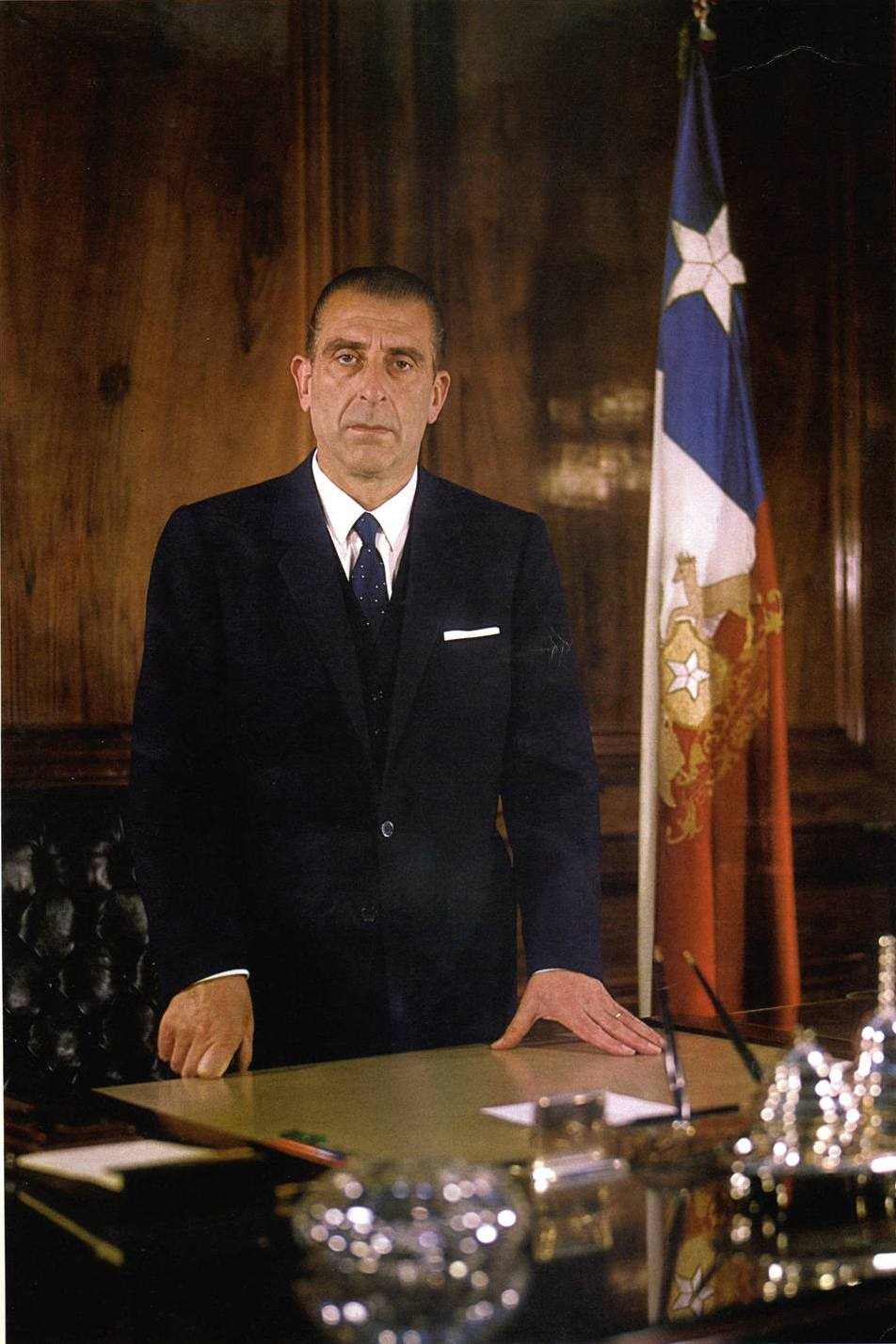
- Official portrait, 1964

28th President of Chile
- In office 3 November 1964 – 3 November 1970
- Preceded by: Jorge Alessandri
- Succeeded by: Salvador Allende

President of the Senate of Chile
- In office 23 May 1973 – 21 September 1973
- Preceded by: Américo Acuña (Acting)
- Succeeded by: Gabriel Valdés

Member of the Senate
- In office 15 May 1973 – 11 September 1973
- Constituency: 4th Provincial Grouping
- In office 15 May 1957 – 15 May 1964
- Constituency: 4th Provincial Grouping
- In office 15 May 1949 – 15 May 1957
- Constituency: 2nd Provincial Grouping

Minister of Public Works
- In office 14 May 1945 – 28 January 1946
- President: Juan Antonio Ríos
- Preceded by: Gustavo Lira Manso
- Succeeded by: Manuel Tovarías

Personal details
- Born: Eduardo Nicanor Frei Montalva; 16 January 1911 Santiago, Chile
- Died: 22 January 1982 (aged 71) Santiago, Chile
- Resting place: Cementerio General de Santiago
- Party: Christian Democrat
- Spouse: María Ruiz-Tagle Jiménez (m. 1935)
- Children: Irene; Carmen; Isabel; Mónica; Eduardo; Jorge; Francisco

Eduardo Nicanor Frei Montalva (Spanish pronunciation: [eˈðwaɾðo fɾej monˈtalβa]; 16 January 1911 – 22 January 1982) was a Chilean political leader. In his long political career, he was Minister of Public Works, president of his Christian Democratic Party, senator, President of the Senate, and the 28th president of Chile from 1964 to 1970. His eldest son, Eduardo Frei Ruiz-Tagle, also became president of Chile (1994–2000).

Said political party supported the Armed Forces intervention to remove his successor Salvador Allende from office in 1973, after the Chamber of Deputies, on 22 August 1973, accused Allende of violating the Constitution. He was later a vocal opponent of the Augusto Pinochet regime. On 22 January 1982, Frei died in Santiago, Chile, following surgery. Assassination was suspected by some but has never been proven. On 18 August 2023, the Supreme Court ruled out the assassination charges and declared innocent all those accused.

== Early life ==
Eduardo Frei Montalva was born in Santiago on 16 January 1911, the son of Eduard Frei Schlinz, a Germanic immigrant born in Feldkirch, Austria (whose mother was Bavarian and his father was Swiss), and Victoria Montalva Martínez. In 1914, his family moved to Lontué, where his father had been hired as an accountant at a winery. In addition, his other two siblings, Arturo and Irene, were born. He attended the Escuela Pública de Lontué (Public School of Lontué). The winery San Pedro is still well known in Lontué and Molina 200 km south of Santiago and was founded in 1865 by the brothers Bonifacio and José Gregorio Correa Albano.

In 1919 the family returned to Santiago and Eduardo, as a young man, entered the boarding school Seminario Conciliar de Santiago where he remained until 1922. In 1923, he entered Instituto de Humanidades Luis Campino, where he graduated in 1928, at the age of 17.

As an 18-year-old, he entered Universidad Católica School of Law in 1929. For two years, he had been visiting María, the sister of his friend, Alfredo Ruiz-Tagle. He attended high school and went on to study law, graduating as a lawyer in 1933. He married María Ruiz-Tagle with whom he had 7 children. His eldest son, Eduardo Frei Ruiz-Tagle, was President of Chile from 1994 to 2000.

== Political career ==
He began his political career in the Conservative Party, but was among a group of young men who founded their own party in 1938: the Falange Nacional. He was minister of Public Works in 1945, and in 1949, Frei was elected senator for Atacama and Coquimbo. The same year he published "Historia de los Partidos Políticos Chilenos" ("History of Chilean Political Parties") in collaboration with Albert Edwards Vives. In 1950, he traveled to New York as a UN delegate. In 1952, at 41 years of age, Frei Montalva announced his first candidacy in the presidential elections.

The 1952 election was won by Carlos Ibáñez del Campo. Later, President Ibañez requested Frei to organize an executive committee. However, this never came to be. In 1954, the UN appointed him President of the Commission in charge of elaborating the report of the Conference of Chancellors held in Rio de Janeiro. Some of its members were: Carlos Lleras Restrepo, former President of Colombia, and Raúl Prebisch director of ECLAC. The report served as a basis for subsequent studies on economic development and the integration of Latin America. In 1956 he was elected Senator in Santiago by first majority.

On 27 July 1957, the Falange Nacional became the Christian Democratic Party of Chile, and he became the undisputed leader. Frei Montalva was offered once more the candidacy for president of the Republic in the 1958 elections. Jorge Alessandri Rodríguez was elected president while Eduardo Frei Montalva took only third place.

During these years he published three more books: "Sentido y Forma de una Política" ("Meaning and Shape of Politics"), "La Verdad Tiene Su Hora" ("Truth Has Its Time"), and "Pensamiento y Acción" ("Thought and Action"). In 1960, he lectured at conference “The Mission of Universities in Latin America” in Montevideo; a widely promoted conference at that time. In 1961, he was elected President of the First World Christian Democratic Party Congress, held in Santiago, Chile. The congress was attended by delegations from throughout Latin America, European, North American, and African countries. That year he was invited as special guest to a seminar on the problems of Developing Nations, held at Oxford University. The seminar was attended by delegates from all over the world.

Between 1960 and 1962, he lectured at Columbia University on problems in Latin America. In 1962, he gave a conference at Notre Dame University on the development and the integration of Latin American countries. He ran for president again in 1964. Declassified documents show that from 1962 through 1964, the CIA spent a total of $2.6 million to finance his presidential campaign and spent $3 million in anti-Allende propaganda "to scare voters away from Allende's FRAP coalition". The CIA considered its role in the victory of Frei a great success.

That year he was elected with his "Revolución en Libertad" ("Revolution in Liberty") slogan by a large margin (56%), defeating Socialist candidate Salvador Allende who only received 39% of the vote, but who subsequently won the 1970 Chilean presidential election.

== Administration ==
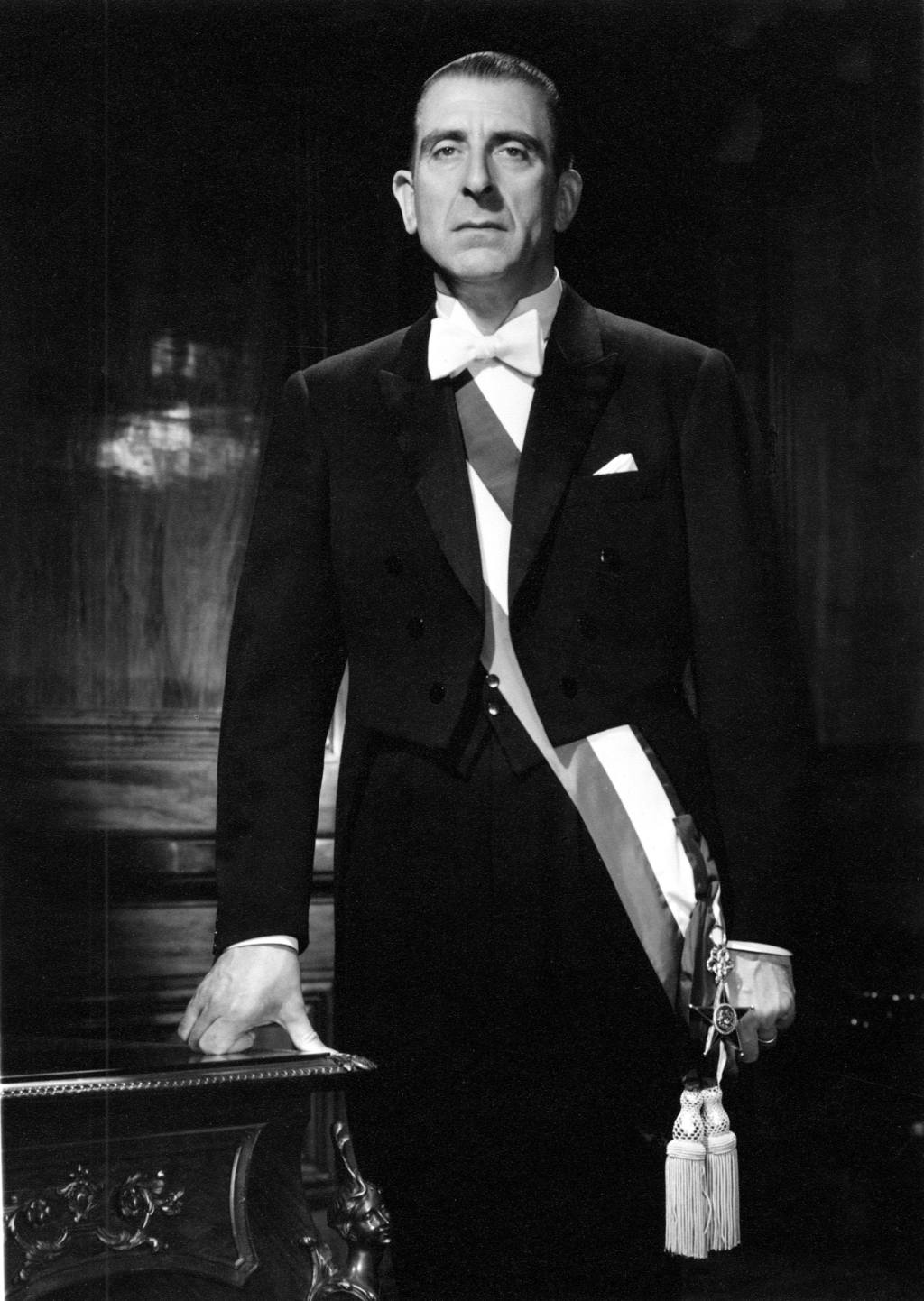
Presidente Eduardo Frei Montalva (1964–1970)

Frei's administration began many reforms in Chilean society. "Promoción Popular" (Social Promotion), "Reforma Agraria" (Agrarian Reform), "Reforma Educacional" (Education Reform), and "Juntas de Vecinos" (Neighborhood Associations) were some of his main projects. He also took measures to rationalize drug supply. On 4 September 1964, having one of the highest turnouts in Chilean history, Frei Montalva was elected President of the Republic of Chile. He took office two months later, on November 4.

The Frei presidency did much to tackle poverty, as characterised by the growing share of wages as a proportion of GNP. By the end of the Frei presidency, the wage and salaried sector received close to 51% of GNP, compared with 42% at the end of the Alessandri presidency. This positive redistribution of wealth was encouraged by government policies, particularly in the rural sector, where wages rose by 40% in real terms. Between 1964 and 1970, total enrollment in education increased by 46%, while around 250,000 houses were built, mostly for the poor.

Frei's administration also introduced a wealth tax and carried out a property tax reassessment in order to make the taxation system more progressive. Taxes as a percentage of GNP increased 12.8% in 1964 to 21.2% in 1970. The social reforms introduced by Frei's government led to a huge increase in public expenditure, which rose as a proportion of GNP from 35.7% in 1965 to 46.9% in 1970. Expenditures on education, agriculture, and housing rose went up considerably, with spending on housing increasing by 70% in real terms in 1965 alone.

During Frei's six years in office, an average of 40,000 housing units were constructed each year, and a total of 100,000 lots were assigned. Investments in primary care clinics and hospitals were also carried out, with 20 clinics and 16 hospitals built between 1965 and 1969.

In 1965, he started a presidential tour through France, the United Kingdom, Federal Republic of Germany, Italy and the Vatican. During this time, he also visited countries in Latin America such as: Argentina, Brazil, Uruguay, Colombia, Peru, Ecuador, and Venezuela; places where he delivered important speeches on international issues.

On his return, he initiated important plans involving housing, education, reforestation, land reform, health, and the nationalization of copper. The Comisión Nacional de Cultura (National Culture Commission), the Consejería Nacional de la Promoción Popular and the Juntas de Vecinos ("Neighborhood Committees") were also created.

One area of reform given high priority by the Frei Administration was the fostering of networks of local, self-help organisations (especially among the "unorganised" residents of the shantytowns), which was placed under a national supervisory council. As a result of the government's actions, mothers' centres, sports associations, youth clubs, residents' committees, and parents' groups proliferated, with an estimated 20,000 units of this type in existence by 1970, according to government figures. Half of these new units were mothers' centres, with an estimated membership of 45,000 women, and the government claimed to have distributed 70,000 sewing machines to these centres. According to Frei, these measures had given "a new form of life and hope" to hundreds of thousands of people.

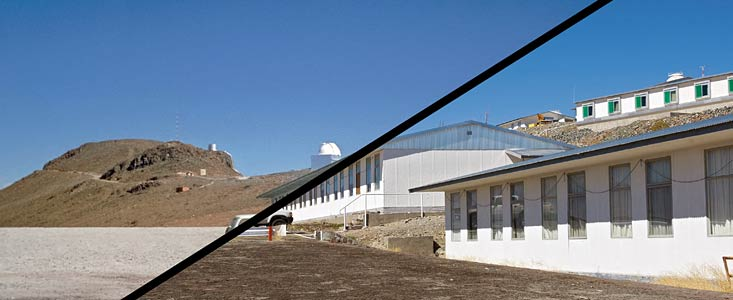
On 25 March 1969, the ESO site at La Silla was finally formally inaugurated by President Eduardo Frei Montalva.

Improvements were also made in areas such as housing, education and medical care. Between 1964 and 1970, around 260,000 houses were constructed (around a third by the state housing corporation CORVI) and about 200,000 housing solutions were claimed (referring to the provision of sites for self-help housing projects). The number of hospitals (and beds) doubled under the PDC, and spending on education as a proportion of public expenditure rose from one-seventh to one-fifth. Around 3,000 new schools were built throughout the country, and by 1970 95% of children in the relevant age group were covered by primary education. Expenditure on scholarships and school loans was doubled, and school enrollment was raised from 1.8 million to 2.9 million.

Expenditure on education doubled, the number of years of basic education was increased from six to eight, and a two-shift school-day was introduced that doubled the capacity of the country's system. Frei's initiatives in education led to increased rates of enrollment in both primary and secondary education, with primary school coverage reaching 90% in the majority of rural and urban areas by 1970, while secondary school coverage reached 49% in 1970, compared with 18% at the start of the 1960s.

A new law establishing work-accident and occupational disease insurance was signed into law in January 1968, providing for compulsory coverage of all salaried employees and wage earners, including apprentices and domestic servants. In March that year, a piece of legislation creating government-sponsored health insurance for public and private salaried employees and their dependents was signed into law.

Basic health services were expanded with the training of community health workers, the building of rural health clinics, and the shifting of financial and personnel resources from hospitals to community health centres. These efforts contributed to a steep decline in infant mortality in Chile during the 1960s–1970s.

Much attention was also given to the improvement of social and economic conditions in the countryside. Both rural unionisation and agrarian reform were accelerated, with the government starting to expropriate estates in a serious way. Family allowance for farmers was doubled, the agricultural minimum wage was raised to the same level as its urban equivalent, and an agrarian reform law signed by Frei in July 1967 made all farms of more than eighty "basic" hectares liable to expropriation. The Frei Administration had thus made a major start to land reform, a policy continued by the Allende Government.

The agrarian reform carried out by the Frei Government organized the reformed sector according to a temporary system established in the law, whereby the expropriated estates became asentamientos. This was a legal form in which the farm operated as a joint enterprise between the state and the peasants who had lived in the former latifundia (extensive agricultural estates), with the state providing the credits, land, and technical assistance, and the peasants their labor. After an indeterminate period, the land would be made available for subdivision into small private plots, if the peasants wished. According to one study, the percentage of the population living below the poverty line steadily fell; from 39% in 1965 to 17% in 1970.

During his administration 8 workers were killed in El Salvador mine and 11 squatters in the Massacre of Puerto Montt. His Minister of the Interior, Edmundo Pérez Zujovic was politically blamed for the deaths. On 21 October 1969 the Tacnazo insurrection, occurred—a brief non-violent demonstration of the Tacna artillery regiment in Santiago, led by General Roberto Viaux.

In 1966, the Andean Group, officially created through its Declaration, signed in January 1965. However, the group culminated with the famous speech delivered by Frei Montalva in Plaza Bolívar, Bogota. The same year the pacts on Chilean copper were signed.

In January 1967 the National Congress refused his constitutional permission to travel to the United States where he had been invited by President Lyndon B. Johnson. In April 1967, he participated in the Meeting of Presidents from American countries, carried out in Montevideo, Uruguay.

In 1970, he was awarded with the Doctor Honoris Causa title by the Pontificia Universidad Católica de Chile. On November 4, he left office, handing over the Presidency to Salvador Allende.

== Support of the coup d'etat against Allende ==
After Allende's 1970 victory, Frei became convinced of what he called a "totalitarian project" to impose a Communist tyranny. In 1971, he gave conferences at universities in Dayton, Ohio, Boston, and the Council of the Americas in New York, denouncing in all of them the actions of the Allende government that were allegedly violating the Constitution and the laws of Chile.

In the March 1973 parliamentary elections he was elected Senator for Santiago by a first majority. He was afterwards elected President of the Senate and became the leader of the opposition to Allende. On 6 July 1973, he met with the executive directors of the industrialists' association (SOFOFA). They told Frei that the country was disintegrating and that if urgent measures were not taken, Chile would fall under a bloody Cuban-style Marxist dictatorship. Frei responded: "There is nothing that can be done by myself, by the Congress, or by any civilian. Unfortunately, this problem can only be fixed with guns." Instead of going to the Congress, we should go to the regiments. "I fully share your apprehensions, and I advise you to state them plainly to commanders-in-chief of the Armed Forces, hopefully today."

On 11 September 1973, during the coup d'etát President Allende died by suicide in the presidential palace, La Moneda, as the Armed Forces seized power. Frei's Christian Democratic Party supported the Armed Forces intervention to remove Allende from office in 1973, after the Chamber of Deputies, on 22 August 1973, accused Allende of violating the Constitution.

In November 1973 Frei wrote a historic letter to Mariano Rumor, President of the Christian Democrat and People's Parties International, endorsing the Armed Forces intervention and denouncing what he alleged was an attempt by Allende to impose a Communist dictatorship in Chile.

Between 1973 and 1977, Frei Montalva was invited to different countries and participated in conferences, such as the Atlantic Conference in 1976. In 1975 he published his book El Mandato de la Historia y las Exigencias del Porvenir ("The Mandate of History and Demands of the Future"), and in 1977 his quintessential book América Latina: Opción y Esperanza ("Latin America: Option and Hope") which has been translated into several languages.

In the period between 1977 and 1982, he was invited to participate in the Brandt Commission, led by Willy Brandt. As a member, he attended meetings held in Germany, Switzerland, Mali, United States, Malaysia, France, Austria, Belgium, and Great Britain. As a Brandt Commission delegate he engaged with important executives from IDB, OAS, and ECLAC.

In 1980, he participated in the Meeting of Former Democrat Presidents of Latin America held in Caracas, Venezuela. In 1981, he was invited to the Club of Rome International Conference on the "Alternatives for Humanity: Latin America Mission" also held in Caracas. His last book El Mensaje Humanista ("The Humanist Message") was published.

Later, Frei became an opponent of Pinochet's military government. He opposed the extension of Pinochet's presidency in 1981, leading a rally against it.

== Death ==
In 1981, Frei was suffering from chronic acid reflux, stemming from a hiatal hernia, an unpleasant but not life-threatening condition. He was operated on for the condition, but died in Santiago on 22 January 1982, six days after his 71st birthday. His death at the time was attributed to septicaemia stemming from surgery. He was buried in the Cementerio General de Santiago.

It was later alleged that Frei had been poisoned by DINA, the intelligence service of the military government, with a toxin produced by biochemist Eugenio Berrios. After it was reported that researchers from the University of Ghent in Belgium had discovered traces of mustard gas in Frei's body, the former president's family filed a lawsuit.

Frei's personal doctor, Patricio Rojas, who was also his Minister of the Interior, denied the accusations. El Mercurio columnist Hermógenes Pérez de Arce disputed the existence of the Belgian report, citing a denial by the university's chief of communications, Tom de Smedt, that an investigation had been done at the university. Tissue samples sent to FBI labs and to the labs at the University of Ghent showed no evidence of toxic substances. A Chilean doctor reportedly found residues of sulfonic salts, which can be the result of the decomposition of mustard gas but can also be the result of the decomposition of a corpse.

In December 2009, six individuals were arrested for their roles in the alleged assassination.

Judge Alejandro Madrid based his decision on a report that determined that low doses of thallium and mustard gas were administered to Frei over an extended period while he was hospitalized at the Santa María Clinic in Santiago, and that these toxic substances had the effect of decreasing Frei's immune system, making him too weak to survive his surgery.

The report was widely criticized by the surgical team in El Mercurio and La Segunda, newspapers owned by the Edwards family, who had brokered the coup and maintained strong ties to the CIA and Pinochet's government. The Appeals Court suspended Judge Madrid from the case, and the accused were freed on bail.

The case was re-opened in 2010 after a failed attempt to disqualify Judge Madrid.

On 30 January 2019, the six suspects were found guilty of homicide and given sentences ranging from 3 to 10 years in prison. On 25 January 2021, the convictions would be overturned by a Chile Appeals Court three judge panel which found that Montalva was not a homicide victim. The Supreme Court of Chile would also find that Frei was not a homicide victim on 18 August 2023 as well.

== See also ==
- Frei family
- Great Drought of 1968–1969
- List of unsolved deaths
- Tacnazo

Political offices
Preceded by Jorge Alessandri	President of Chile; 1964−1970	Succeeded by Salvador Allende
Preceded by Américo Acuña	President of the Senate of Chile; 1973	Succeeded by Government Junta
