= Eliodoro Yáñez =

Chilean journalist, lawyer and politician

His Excellency Eliodoro Yáñez gcYC
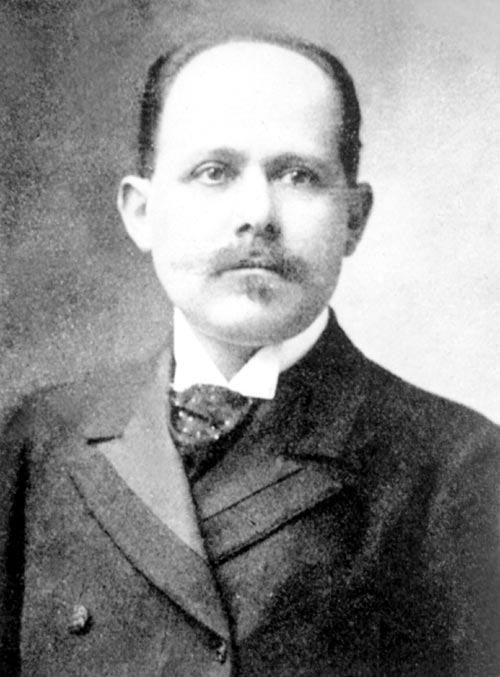
- Born: May 6, 1860; Santiago, Chile
- Died: July 26, 1932 (aged 72); Santiago, Chile

Eliodoro Yáñez Ponce de León (May 6, 1860 – July 26, 1932) was a Chilean journalist, lawyer, and politician, and was one of the founders of La Nación newspaper. He also served several times as minister and as President of the Senate of Chile.

Yáñez was born in Santiago, the son of Manuel Antonio Yañez Guerrero and of María Josefa Ponce de León. He coursed his liberal arts studies at the Instituto Nacional, and then enrolled in the Universidad de Chile, where he obtained his law degree on 27 May 1883. He soon became known as one of the most versed men around when it came to knowledge and interpretation of laws, and he also had very sound reasoning; the cases (cause) he won in court, where he was highly respected, are thanks to these qualities. His level of prestige was such that his opinions were considered decisive, and were sought out by professionals and magistrates for the resolution of complicated matters.

His unquestionable calling as a jurist led him to develop, along with Ricardo Passi Garcia, a Compilation of Current Laws and Decrees (1884), which was very well received. At the same time, he published articles in several different newspapers, most of them judicial in nature (for example On electoral freedom (Spanish: La libertad electoral) and the Forensics magazine (Spanish: La Revista forense). This passion for the articles he wrote transformed him into a figure of journalism at the time.

At the time he was practicing as a lawyer and working as a journalist, Eliodoro Yañez was appointed as the rapporteur for the Appeals Court of Santiago (1889). He entered the Liberal party and became a board member in 1893. One year later he was elected deputy for Valdivia and La Union, position he was reelected to on several occasions until 1903. He was vice-president of the Chamber of Deputies in 1894 and 1895. Also, he was elected a senator for Valdivia in 1912 and reelected for several terms until 1930. His parliamentary work was prolific, to such a point that it is said that while he remained in Congress, there were no bills that had not been proposed, studied or reviewed by him.

Yañez believed that progress in journalism was fundamental in strengthening democracy. Due to this, he was not only the editor of several printed media from that time, but he also performed a great contribution to the country by founding –along with senators Alfredo Escobar Campaña, Augusto Bruna Valenzuela and Abraham Silva- the La Nación newspaper, the first issue of which was published on January 14, 1917. The new newspaper was characterized for defending liberal ideas, having an excellent presentation and using educated language. In addition, La Nacion acquired other newspapers, like Los Tiempos (The Times) (1921) and the Correo de Valdivia (The Valdivia Post) (1924).

In addition to being a member of parliament, he was a State minister on several occasions. Between 1901 and 1902, under the administration of German Riesco, he held the position of minister of Foreign Relations, Cult and Colonization and he was subrogate minister of the Treasury. Fifteen years later, he served as minister of the Interior for Juan Luis Sanfuentes' government between 1917 and 1918. During this period he signed the law that introduced reforms to the Constitution of 1833. He died in Santiago in 1932.

Political offices
Preceded by Luis Martiniano Rodríguez	Minister of Foreign Affairs, Cult and Colonization; 1901–1902	Succeeded by Horacio Pinto
Preceded by Ismael Tocornal	Minister of the Interior; 1917–1918	Succeeded by Domingo Amunátegui
Preceded by Luis Claro Solar	President of the Senate; 1924	Succeeded by Government Junta
