= Parliamentary Republic (Chile) =

Period of Chilean history, 1891–1925

Republic of Chile República de Chile
- 1891–1925
- Flag (1891–1912) Coat of arms

- Capital: Santiago
- Common languages: Spanish
- Religion: Roman Catholicism (official religion) until 1925
- Government: Unitary quasi-parliamentary republic: under military dictatorship (1924–1925)
- President
  - 1891–1896: Jorge Montt (first)
  - 1925–1925: Arturo Alessandri Palma (last)
- History
  - Civil War: 18 September 1891
  - Constitution of 1925: 18 September 1925
- Currency: Chilean peso
Preceded by	Succeeded by
Liberal Republic	Presidential Republic

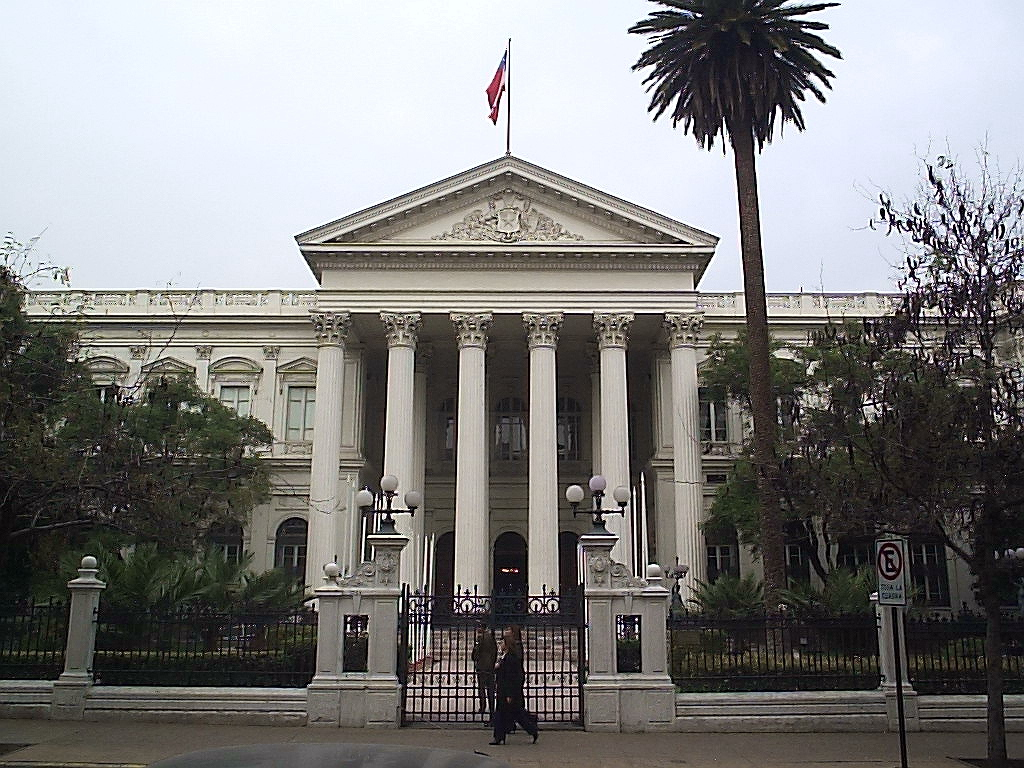
Former National Congress in Santiago de Chile, ex-seat of the parliamentary power.

The Parliamentary Republic or the "Parliamentary period of Chile" or the "Pseudo-parliamentary period" was a historical period in Chile, following that of the "Liberal Republic", beginning with the conclusion 1891 Chilean Civil War, and ending 1925 with the establishment of the 1925 Constitution. The period's name derives from the de facto parliamentary or quasi-parliamentary system established based on the amendments and interpreation of the 1833 Chilean Constitution following the decisive defeat of forces loyal to President José Manuel Balmaceda during the Civil War. As opposed to a "true" parliamentary system, it reflected a shift from intent and earlier practice presidential system partisally by convention, as the President of Chile nominally had remained the "supreme head of government" as well as head of state, with the power to issue decrees on the execution of the laws of the Chilean Congress (only with the signature of the relevant minister) and the sole right to name ministers. The Parliamentary Republic lasted until the 1925 Constitution, drafted by President Arturo Alessandri and his minister José Maza. The new constitution established a clearly defined [residential system of government, which lasted, with several amendments, until the 1973 coup d'état.

The period saw a clarification of Chilean borders, as it temporarily resolved its border disputes with Argentina with the Boundary treaty of 1881 between Chile and Argentina, the Puna de Atacama Lawsuit of 1899 and the Cordillera of the Andes Boundary Case, 1902.

== Parliamentarism ==
The pseudo-parliamentary system was established in Chile following José Manuel Balmaceda's defeat in the 1891 Chilean Civil War. Whereas in a complete parliamentary system the chief of government is designed by the parliamentary majority, and usually belongs to it, the function of chief of government was hereby unofficially assumed by the Minister of Interior. The National Congress indirectly controlled his nomination and the rest of the cabinet through the vote of the periodical laws (leyes periódicas), the budget, the military credits, etc. Others means of control included the refusal, by any one of the two Chambers (Senate or Chamber of Deputies) to vote a motion of confidence or the refusal to vote laws of lesser importance proposed by the executive.

While a Parliament may withdraw its confidence in the Prime minister in the Westminster-style parliamentary system, the head of government is normally granted the power of dissolution of parliament, leading to the calling of new elections in order to have the sovereign people arbitrate between the legislative and the executive. However, in the Chilean system, the President of the Republic did not dispose of this power of dissolution, thus restricting the Prime Minister's margins of decision.

The system of parties was very fluid, functioning on the basis of groups depending on individual personalities or caudillos who held the control of the parties and could form or dissolve cabinets. Furthermore, there was no established voting discipline in the parties. The custom was soon established for the President to nominate "universal cabinets" which included ministers from all parties. The stability of these cabinets was therefore dependent on the political intrigues in the National Congress.

Parliamentary instability was quite strong during this period, with a large rotation of cabinets. This pseudo-parliamentary system was terminated with the 1925 Constitution which declared incompatible the charges of ministers with parliamentary offices and made the approval of the Ley de Presupuestos automatic, which included the organization of the state income, if the Congress did not approve it after a while. It also enacted the election of the President at universal direct suffrage.

== Political structure and electoral practices ==
The main parties between 1891 and 1925 included, from right to left, the Conservative Party, close to the Roman Catholic Church; various liberal groups in the center belonging to the National Party (aka Monttvarista after Manuel Montt and Antonio Varas), the Liberal Party, the Liberal Democratic Party (or Balmacedista); and on the left the Radical Party and the Democrat Party. At the end of the 1910s, the Socialist Workers Party, associated with the labour movement, began to gain some importance.

These parties allied themselves either in the Coalition, grouping the Conservative Party and the liberals, or in the Liberal Alliance, composed by the liberals and the Radical Party.

As opposed to the Conservative Republic (1831–1861) or the Liberal Republic (1861–1891), the executive power did not interfere in the elections as it did through intendants, governors and inspectors. Elections were organized by the municipalities of Chile, held by various local caudillos. Bribes, electoral fraud, stealing of ballot boxes were frequent in rural zones.

== Social groups ==
Three main social classes composed the Parliamentary Republic: the oligarchy, the middle classes and the working classes.

The aristocracy was formed by the landlords, politicians, saltpeter entrepreneurs (many of whom were foreigners), bankers, physicians, intellectuals, etc. They lived in neoclassical palaces or mansions, followed European fashion, etc. The oligarchy, however, was internally divided on some points; hence the many parties, the two main alliances, with the liberals joining either the Conservative Party or the Radical Party.

The working classes were formed by saltpeter workers, industrial workers and workers in public works, as well as landless peasants. The first lived in the north, in huts made of Calamina, where differences in temperature between day and night spanned 30 degrees Celsius. Others workers lived in conventillos (dormitories) or in round quarters (rooms without windows or lighting). Peasants lived on ranches. All worked without contracts between 12 and 16 hours daily without Sunday sabbath. Some were paid by company scrips.

== The economy of saltpeter ==
Saltpeter, sodium nitrate, was the main resource of Chile and the economy revolved around it. A third of the profits of saltpeter mining were taken by foreigners, the second third by the state, which taxed exports, and the last third was used to re-invest in the saltpeter mines. The state used the revenue to build infrastructure (roads, railroads, ports, etc.).

== Presidents of the Parliamentary Republic ==
The charge of Vice-President was exercised as an interim by the Minister of Interior if the President died.

- Alm. Jorge Montt Álvarez (1891–1896)
- Federico Errázuriz Echaurren (1896–1901)
- Germán Riesco Errázuriz (1901–1906)
- Pedro Montt Montt (1906–1910)
- Elías Fernández Albano (1910 as Vice-President)
- Emiliano Figueroa Larraín (1910 as Vice-President)
- Ramón Barros Luco (1910–1915)
- Juan Luis Sanfuentes (1915–1920)
- Arturo Alessandri Palma (1920–1924)
- September Junta and January Junta (1924–25)
- Arturo Alessandri Palma (1925 - 1925)

== See also ==
- Chilenization of Tacna, Arica and Tarapacá
- Patriotic Leagues (Southern Cone)
- South American dreadnought race
- Saber noise incident of 1924

== Sources ==
The original version of this article draws heavily on the corresponding article in the Spanish-language Wikipedia, which was accessed in the version of 4 May 2007.
