= 1909 Chilean parliamentary election =

- 7 March 1909
- Chamber of Deputies
- All 95 seats in the Chamber of Deputies
Party	Seats
Conservative	23
Radical	19
National	18
Liberal Democratic	15
Liberal (Alliance)	13
Democrat	5
Liberal (Coalition)	2
This lists parties that won seats. See the complete results below.
- Senate
- 13 of the 37 seats in the Senate
Party	Seats
Liberal Democratic	5
Conservative	3
Liberal (Alliance)	3
Liberal (Coalition)	1
National	1
This lists parties that won seats. See the complete results below.

Parliamentary elections were held in Chile on 7 March 1909 to elect members of the Chamber of Deputies and the Senate.

== Results ==
=== Chamber of Deputies ===
Party	Seats
Conservative Party	23
Radical Party	19
National Party	18
Liberal Democratic Party	15
Liberal Party (Alliance)	13
Democrat Party	5
Liberal Party (Coalition)	2
Total	95
Source: Heise González

=== Senate ===
Party	Seats
Liberal Democratic Party	5
Conservative Party	3
Liberal (Alliance)	3
Liberal (Coalition)	1
National Party	1
Total	13
Source: Heise González
