= 1912 Chilean parliamentary election =

- 3 March 1912
- Chamber of Deputies
- All 118 seats in the Chamber of Deputies
Party	Vote %	Seats
Liberal Alliance (60 seats)
Liberal	18.30	22
Radical	16.30	24
National	13.10	14
Coalition (55 seats)
Conservative	18.49	25
Liberal Democratic	18.49	25
Democrat	5.98	5
Independents
Independents	6.56	3
This lists parties that won seats. See the complete results below.
- Senate
- 25 of the 37 seats in the Senate
Party	Vote %	Seats
Liberal Alliance (14 seats)
Liberal	24.49	8
Radical	19.63	5
National	9.34	1
Coalition (10 seats)
Conservative	18.08	4
Liberal Democratic	14.76	5
Democrat	5.69	1
Independents
Independents	7.59	1
This lists parties that won seats. See the complete results below.

Parliamentary elections were held in Chile on 3 March 1912 to elect members of the Chamber of Deputies and the Senate. The Liberal Alliance won a majority of seats in both houses.

== Results ==
=== Chamber of Deputies ===
Party or alliance		Votes	%	Seats
Liberal Alliance	Liberal Party	213,383	18.30	22
Liberal Alliance	Radical Party	190,080	16.30	24
Liberal Alliance	National Party	152,819	13.10	14
Liberal Alliance	Total	556,282	47.70	60
Coalition	Conservative Party	247,007	21.18	25
Coalition	Liberal Democratic Party	215,602	18.49	25
Coalition	Democrat Party	69,772	5.98	5
Coalition	Total	532,381	45.65	55
Others		1,008	0.09	0
Independents		76,548	6.56	3
Total		1,166,219	100.00	118
Source: Heise González

=== Senate ===
Party or alliance		Votes	%	Seats
Liberal Alliance	Liberal Party	105,070	24.49	8
Liberal Alliance	Radical Party	84,256	19.63	5
Liberal Alliance	National Party	40,089	9.34	1
Liberal Alliance	Total	229,415	53.46	14
Coalition	Conservative Party	77,589	18.08	4
Coalition	Liberal Democratic Party	63,353	14.76	5
Coalition	Democrat Party	24,405	5.69	1
Coalition	Total	165,347	38.53	10
Others		1,784	0.42	0
Independents		32,569	7.59	1
Total		429,115	100.00	25
Source: Heise González
