= 1921 Chilean parliamentary election =

Parliamentary elections were held in Chile on 6 March 1921. The Radical Party received the most votes in the Chamber of Deputies elections.

== Results ==
=== Chamber of Deputies ===
Party	Votes	%
Radical Party	60,095	30.58
Conservative Party	37,722	19.19
Democrat Party	24,469	12.45
Liberal Party (Aliancistas)	24,104	12.26
Liberal Party (Unionistas)	17,378	8.84
Liberal Democratic Party	16,750	8.52
National Party	8,361	4.25
Liberal Democratic Party (Aliancistas)	3,146	1.60
Socialist Workers' Party	2,084	1.06
Other parties	344	0.18
Independents	2,084	1.06
Total	196,537	100.00
Registered voters/turnout	370,314	–
Source: Nohlen
