= 1915 Chilean parliamentary election =

- 7 March 1915

All 116 seats in the Chamber of Deputies 19 of the 32 seats in the Chamber of Senators
- Turnout: 81.3% (▲32.4 pp)

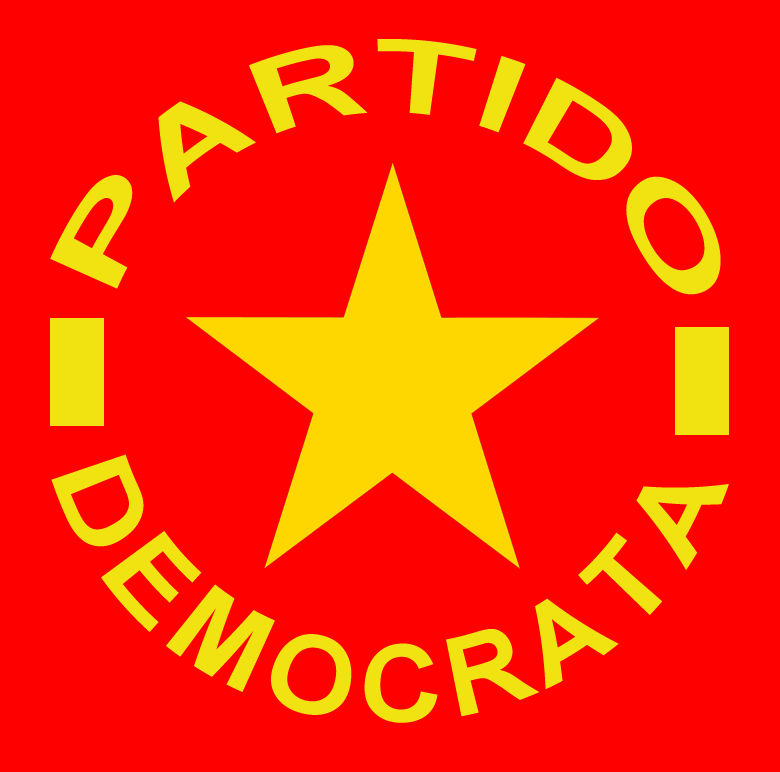
	First party	Second party	Third party
Party	Conservative	Radical	Liberal Democratic
Seats won	28 deputies 4 senators	27 deputies 2 senators	21 deputies 4 senator
Popular vote	33 605	31,755	26,022
Percentage	21.5%	21.1%	17.3%
	Fourth party	Fifth party	Sixth party
Party	Liberal	National	Democrat
Seats won	21 deputies 6 senators	16 deputies 2 senators	5 deputies 1 senator
Popular vote	23,428	14,530	11,882
Percentage	15.6%	9.7%	7.9%

Parliamentary elections were held in Chile on 7 March 1915. The Conservative Party received the most votes in the Chamber of Deputies elections.

The Alianza Liberal - Liberals, Radicals and Democrats - won a majority in the Senate while the Coalicion - Conservatives, Liberal Democrats or Balmacedists, and Nationals – won a majority in the Chamber of Deputies.

== Results ==
=== Chamber of Deputies ===
Party	Votes	%	Seats
Conservative Party	32,264	21.39	28
Radical Party	31,755	21.06	27
Liberal Democratic Party	26,022	17.26	21
Liberal Party	23,428	15.54	21
National Party	14,530	9.63	16
Democrat Party	11,882	7.88	5
Socialist Workers' Party	509	0.34	0
Other parties	629	0.42	0
Independents	9,787	6.49	0
Total	150,806	100.00	118
Registered voters/turnout	184,807	–	
Source: Nohlen

=== Chamber of Senators ===
Party	Seats	
Party	Won	Total
Liberal Party	6	11
Liberal Democratic Party	4	7
Conservative Party	4	6
Radical Party	2	4
National Party	2	3
Democrat Party	1	1
Total	19	32
