= 1918 Chilean parliamentary election =

Parliamentary elections were held in Chile on 3 March 1918. The Radical Party received the most votes in the Chamber of Deputies elections. The elections were a victory for the Liberal Alliance, which won a majority in the Senate and command of the Chamber of Deputies.

== Results ==
=== Chamber of Deputies ===
Party	Votes	%
Radical Party	44,915	24.74
Liberal Party	35,901	19.77
Conservative Party	35,066	19.31
Liberal Democratic Party	23,833	13.13
National Party	19,911	10.97
Democrat Party	11,828	6.52
Liberal Democratic Party (Aliancistas)	2,751	1.52
Nationalist Party	1,758	0.97
Socialist Workers' Party	548	0.30
Other parties	153	0.08
Independents	4,886	2.69
Total	181,550	100.00
Registered voters/turnout	341,872	53.10
Source: Nohlen
