= 1925 Chilean parliamentary election =

Parliamentary election in Chile

Parliamentary elections were held in Chile on 22 November 1925. The Liberals, split between various factions (mainly, between those of the Alliance and those of the National Union), emerged as the largest ideological faction in both chambers of the National Congress, winning 17 of the 45 seats in Senate and 42 of the 132 seats in the Chamber of Deputies. The Radical Party remained as the largest party in both chambers, winning 14 in Senate and 40 in Chamber of Deputies.

== Results ==
Party or alliance		Votes	%	Seats			
Party or alliance		Votes	%	Senate	+/–	Chamber	+/–
Liberal Parties	Liberal Party (Note: Including Doctrinal Liberal Party and United Liberal Party)			11	+1 (Note: Combined results obtained by Doctrinal Liberal Party, Unionist Liberal Party and National Party in 1924)	27	+4
Liberal Parties	Liberal Democratic Party (Note: Including Alliancist Liberal Democratic Party and Unionist Liberal Democratic Party)			6	+2	15	-1
Liberal Parties	Independent			0	-1	1	+1
Liberal Parties	Total	84,895	32.43	17	+2	42	+3
Pro-Salas Parties	Democrat Party			3	-1	12	-
Pro-Salas Parties	Communist Party			1	+1	8	+8
Pro-Salas Parties	Social-Republican Union of the Wage Earners of Chile			0	New	2	New
Pro-Salas Parties	Total	58,000	22.16	4	-	22	+10
Radical Party		56,001	21.39	14	+3	40	-4
Conservative Party		51,902	19.82	10	+3	28	+5
Total				45	+8	132	+14
Total votes		261,779	–				
Registered voters/turnout		302,307	86.59				
Source: Vial
