= 1920 Chilean presidential election =

Historical presidential election

- June 25, 1920

354 members of the Electoral College 178 electoral votes needed to win
- Turnout: 45.07%
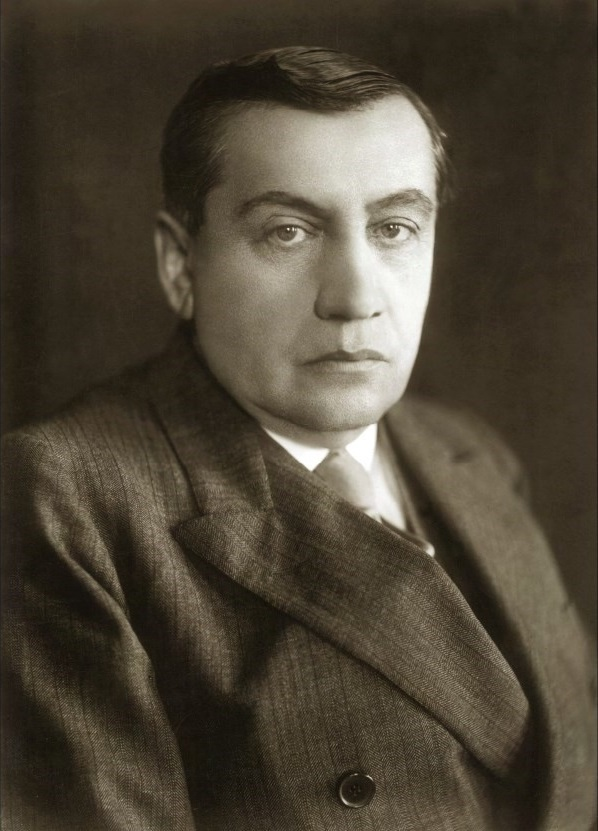

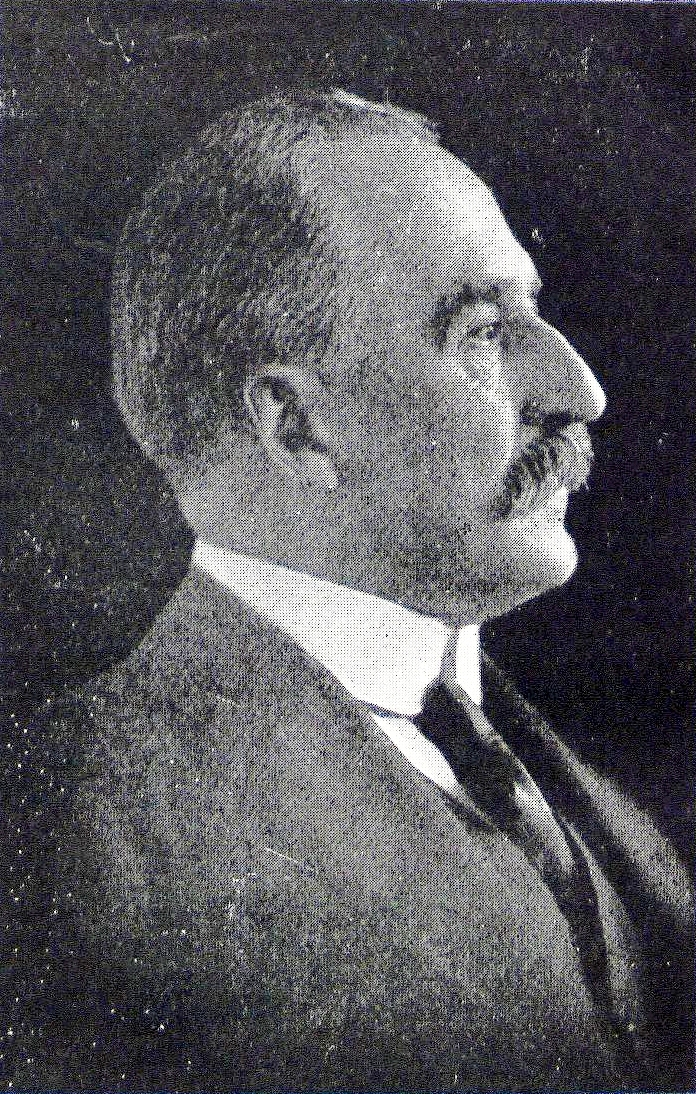
Candidate	Arturo Alessandri	Luis Barros Borgoño
Party	Liberal	Liberal
Alliance	Liberal Alliance	National Union
Popular vote	82,083	83,100
Percentage	49.41%	50.03%
Electoral vote	179	175
Modified result	177	176
- Presidential election results map. Yellow denotes states won by Alessandri and blue denotes states won by Barros. Numbers indicate the number of electoral votes cast by each province.
President before election
Juan Luis Sanfuentes
Liberal Democratic
Elected President
Arturo Alessandri
Liberal

Presidential elections were held in Chile on Friday, June 25, 1920. The Liberal Alliance candidate Arturo Alessandri defeated the National Union candidate Luis Barros Borgoño in the last Chilean presidential election to have been decided by an electoral college. The results were a turning point for Chilean history, setting the end of the succession of oligarch and 19th-century governments and the start of a new, modern one run by the middle class.

Incumbent president Juan Luis Sanfuentes was not able to run for a second term, as specified in the 1871 reform of the constitution. Arturo Alessandri and Eliodoro Yáñez, both Liberals, became the favourite candidates for the Liberal Alliance, formed by the half of the Liberal Party, the Radicals, the Democrats, the Doctrinals and others. Alessandri won the 1920 Liberal Alliance primary vote in the second round, defeating Yáñez, Enrique Mac Iver and Armado Quezada (both Radicals).

The National Union, formed by the National, Liberal Democratic and Nationalist parties and the other half of the Liberals, was divided between those who wanted to come closer to the conservatives and those who did not. Luis Barros Borgoño, Enrique Zañartu and Ismael Tocornal were the principal candidates. The first one won the 1920 National Union Convention with the support of the Conservative Party.

The elections were held in a tense and violent political environment, where the social issues, the Legislative power primacy over the Executive and the separation of church and state were at stake. Both candidates proposed similar government plans, with the main difference being Alessandri's fervent campaign, which included passionate speeches from balconies, to rallies with the Chilean middle class. During his campaign, Alessandri spoke against the rule of the oligarchy and advocated for democratic and renovating reforms. On the contrary, Barros Borgoño presented himself as the candidate of tranquillity and seriousness, accusing his opponent of fomenting class hatred. A third candidate, Luis Emilio Recabarren, from the Socialist Workers' Party, also run in the election, still knowing he had little chances of winning, but stating the election to be just an intern conflict between different branches of the oligarchy.

The election results were almost a tie and were heavily disputed by both sides: the two candidates claimed victory. In the following months, political violence arouse in the country, with the population fearing a revolution. As a response to uncertainty and fraud accusations, a Tribunal of Honour was created to perform a detailed examination of the results. This solution was agreed upon by both parties. On September 30, the verdict was given, giving 177 electoral votes to Alessandri and 176 to Barros Borgoño. The first was declared the winner of the election, and the results modified by the Tribunal were accepted by the Congress in October.

== Nominations ==
=== Liberal Alliance nomination ===

1920 Liberal Alliance ticket

Arturo Alessandri
for President

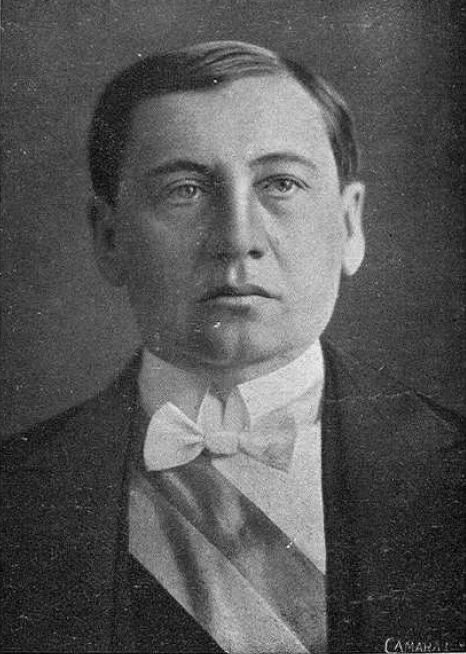

Senator from Tarapacá
(1915–1920)

Liberal Alliance candidates:

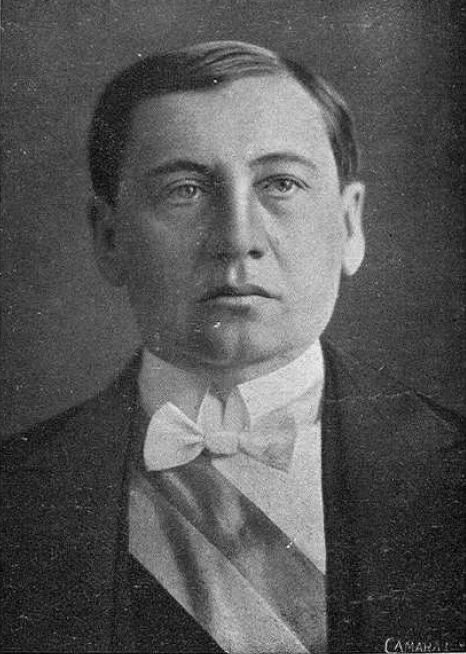
Senator
Arturo Alessandri
from Tarapacá

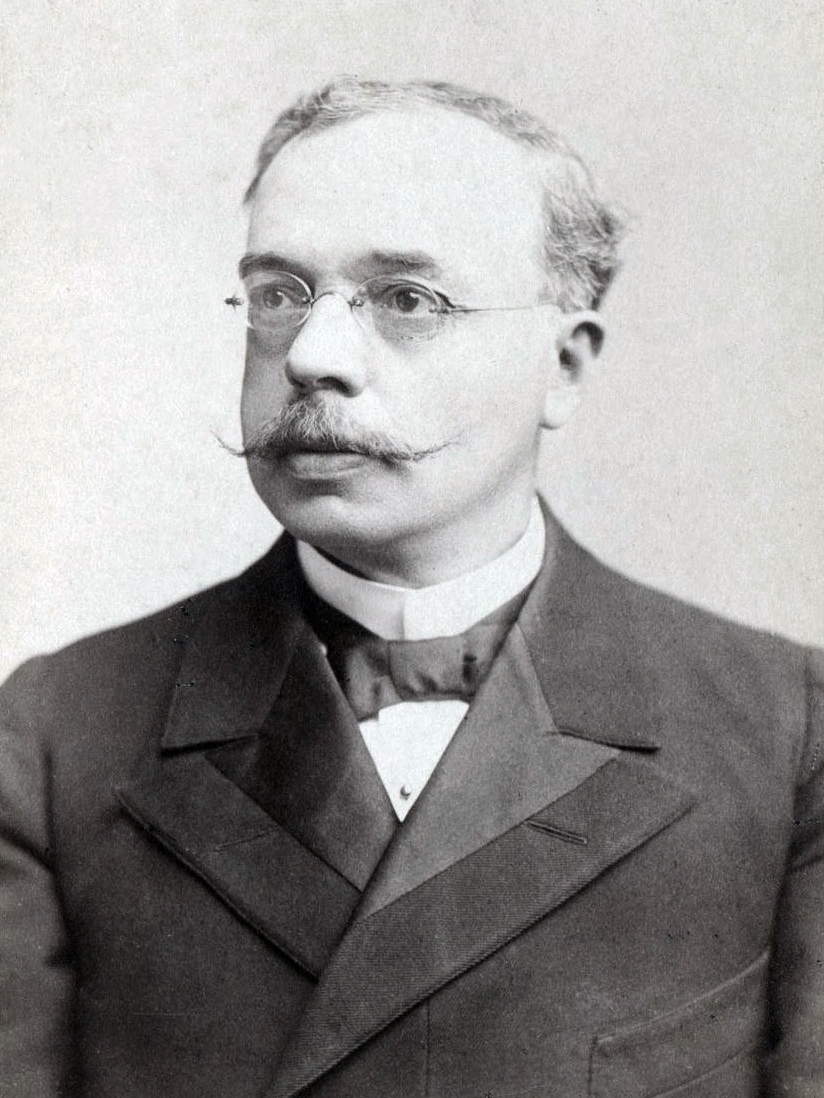
Senator
Enrique Mac Iver Rodríguez
from Atacama

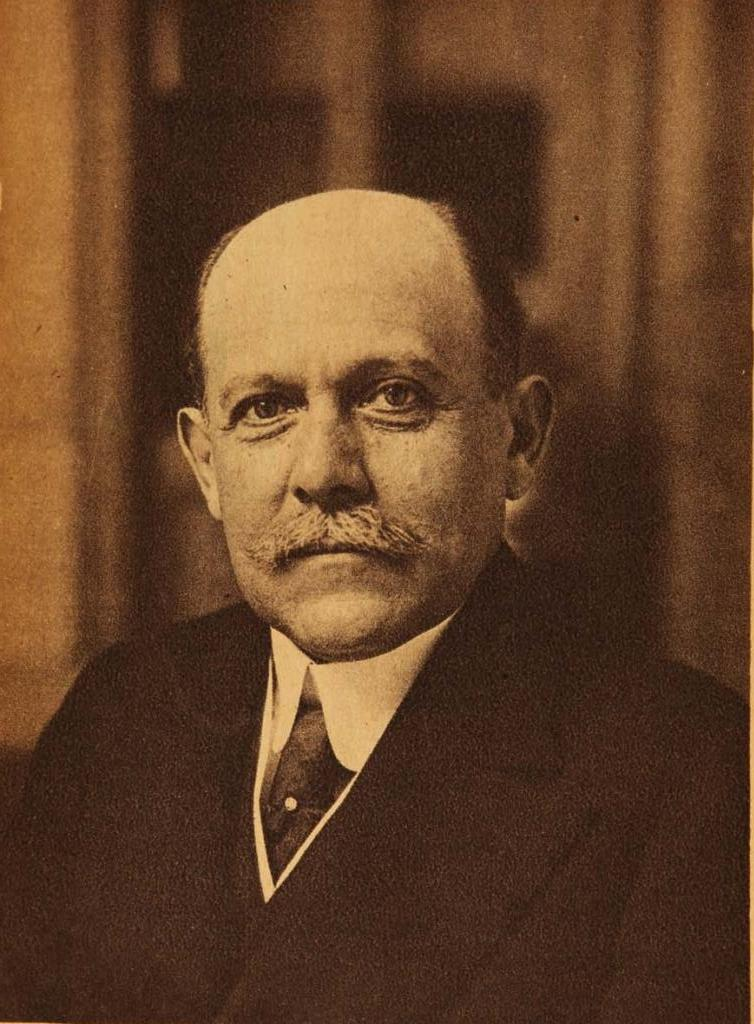
Senator
Eliodoro Yáñez Ponce de León
from Valdivia

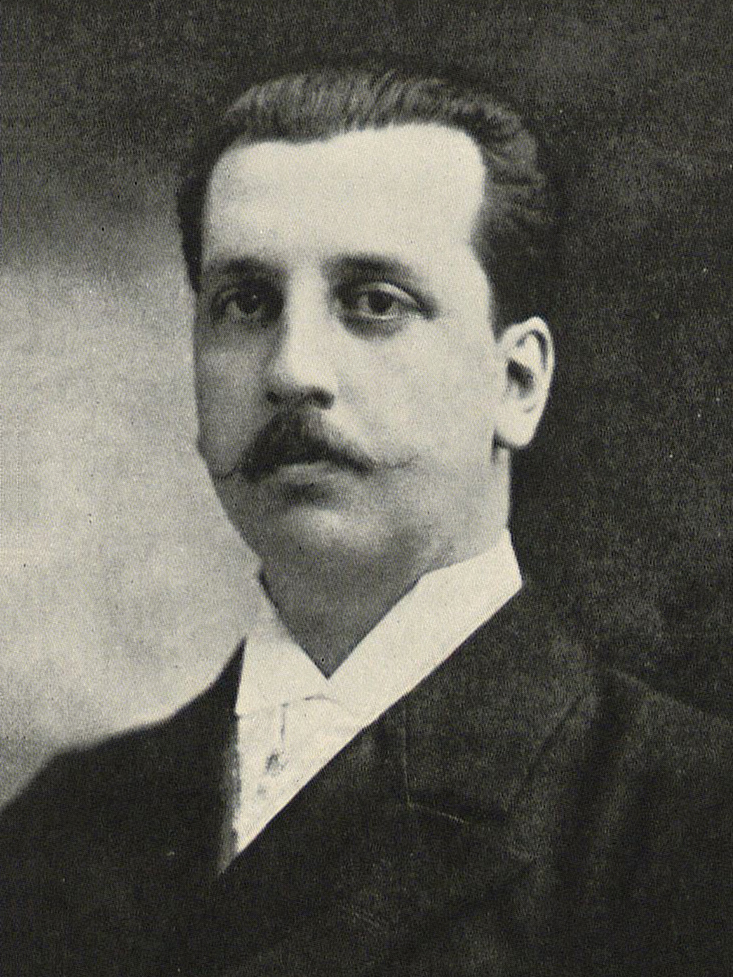
Deputy
Emilio Bello Codesido
from Valparaíso and Casablanca

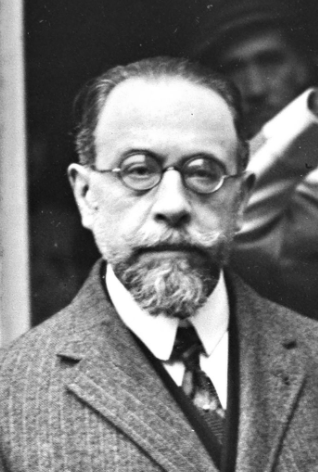
Senator
Armando Quezada Acharán
from Santiago

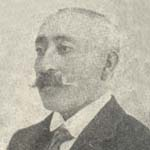
Deputy
Artemio Gutiérrez
from Temuco, Imperial and Llaima

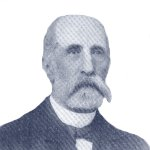
Senator
José María Valderrama Lira
from Cautín

Candidate	First round		Second round	
Candidate	Votes	%	Votes	%
Arturo Alessandri	407	34.32	801	65.66
Enrique Mac Iver	294	24.79	50	4.10
Artemio Gutiérrez Vidal	277	23.36		
Eliodoro Yáñez	102	8.60	261	21.39
José María Valderrama Lira	42	3.54		
Emilio Bello Codesido	34	2.87		
Armando Quezada Acharán	30	2.53	108	8.85
Total	1,186	100.00	1,220	100.00

=== National Union nomination ===
1920 National Union ticket

Luis Barros Borgoño
for President

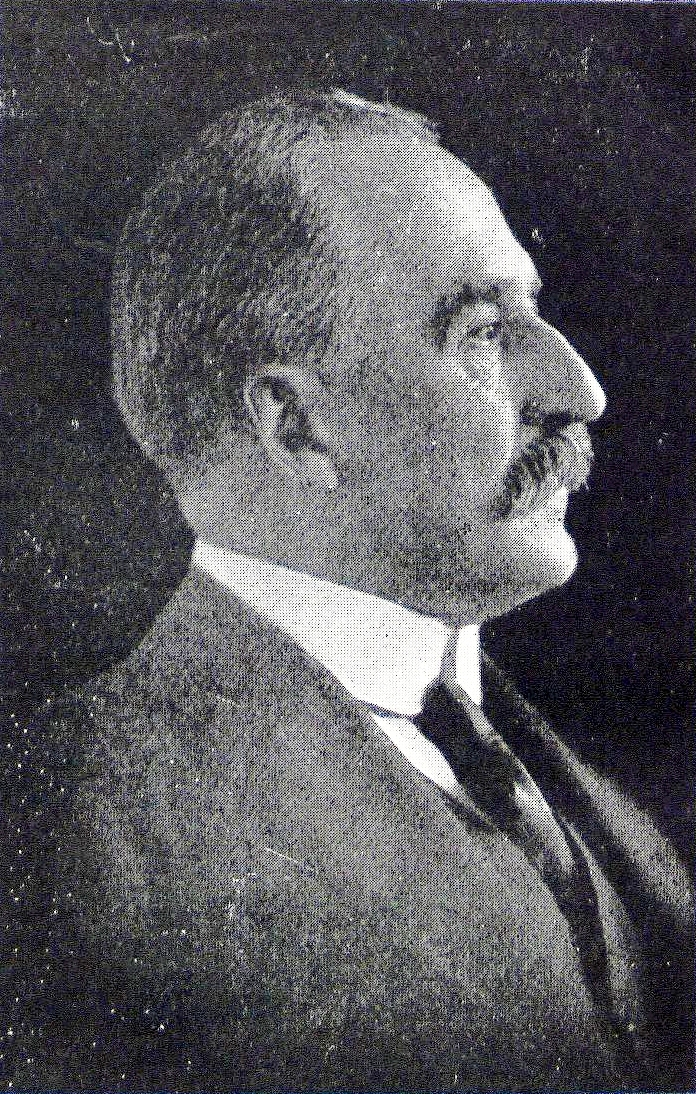

Minister of Foreign Affairs,
Worship and Colonization
(1918–1919)

=== Socialist Workers' Party ===
1920 Socialist Workers' Party ticket

Luis Emilio Recabarren Serrano
for President

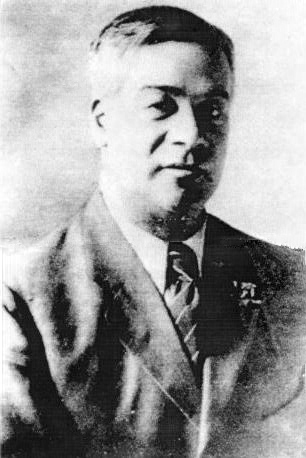

Deputy from Antofagasta,
Taltal and Tocopilla
(1906)

== Results ==
Candidate	Party	Popular vote		Electoral vote	
Candidate	Party	Votes	%	Original	Modified
Luis Barros Borgoño	National Union	83,100	50.03	175	176
Arturo Alessandri	Liberal Alliance	82,083	49.41	179	177
Luis Emilio Recabarren	Socialist Workers Party	681	0.41	0	0
Other candidates		251	0.15	0	0
Total		166,115	100.00	354	353
Valid votes		166,115	99.52		
Invalid votes		802	0.48		
Total votes		166,917	100.00		
Registered voters/turnout		370,314	45.07		
Source: Chilean Elections Database, Nohlen
