= Instituto Nacional General José Miguel Carrera =

Coordinates: 33°26′43.0″S 70°39′02.0″W

Location
- Arturo Prat 33; Santiago, Santiago Metropolitan Region; Chile

Information
- Type: Public school
- Motto: Labor Omnia Vincit (Hard Work Conquers All)
- Established: 1813
- Principal: Fernando Soto Concha
- Grades: 7-12
- Color
- Website: www.institutonacional.cl

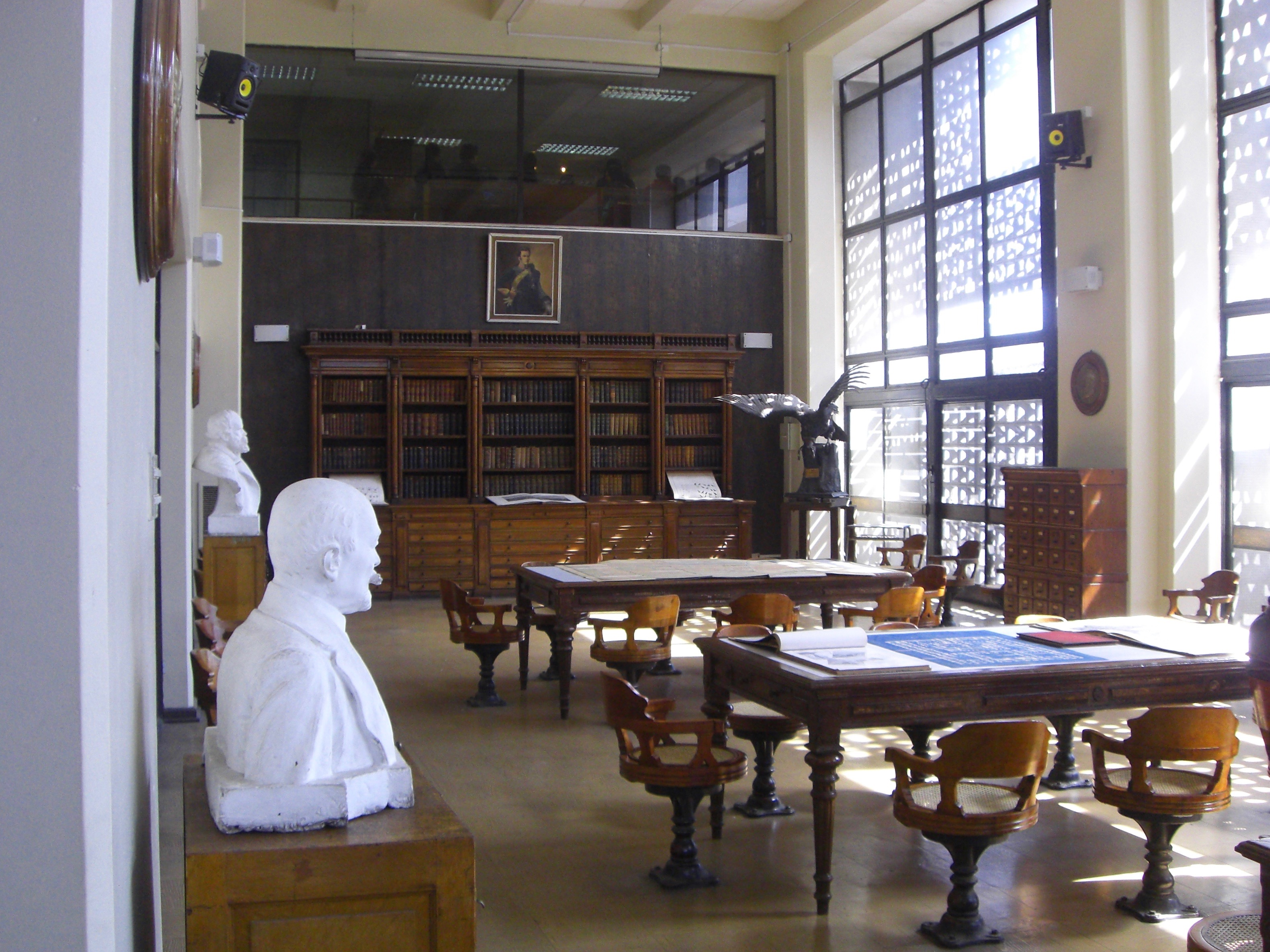
The Instituto Nacional's library

Instituto Nacional General José Miguel Carrera, often shortened to Instituto Nacional (National Institute), is a public middle and high school in downtown Santiago, Chile which teaches 4,400 students between 7th and 12th grade. 170 teachers are employed.

The school was founded on August 10, 1813 by José Miguel Carrera. Its official name is Liceo Ex A-0 - Instituto Nacional General José Miguel Carrera. The Instituto Nacional is one of the few public schools in Chile's largely privatized educational landscape. The school played a role in the long-running student protests for fairer education policies in 2006. When the protests began in 2019 with the increase in metro prices, the students at the Instituto Nacional called for collective fare evasion.

== History ==
The school was founded on August 10, 1813 by Chile's first President and national hero, José Miguel Carrera. The official name is Liceo Ex A-0 - Instituto Nacional General José Miguel Carrera. During the military dictatorship under Augusto Pinochet from 1976, the Chilean educational structures were fundamentally changed, most educational institutions were privatized and the educational system was largely transferred to municipal sponsorship. Despite rejection by the National Educational Institute (Centro de Alumnos del Instituto Nacional, CAIN) and a number of opposition parties, the military junta pushed through the dismantling of public education.

In 1986 the administration of the Instituto Naticonal passed to the Municipality of Santiago. Rector Luis Molina Palacios[4], who had been in office since 1975, then resigned; he had spoken out against the reform.

== Notable alumni ==
- Manuel Bulnes Prieto, President of Chile (1841–1851)
- Manuel Montt Torres, President of Chile (1851–1861)
- José Joaquín Pérez Mascayano, President of Chile (1861–1871)
- Federico Errázuriz Zañartu, President of Chile (1871–1876)
- Aníbal Pinto Garmendia, President of Chile (1876–1881)
- Domingo Santa María González, President of Chile (1881–1886)
- José Manuel Balmaceda Fernández, President of Chile (1886–1891)
- Federico Errázuriz Echaurren, President of Chile (1896–1901)
- Germán Riesco Errázuriz, President of Chile (1901–1906)
- Pedro Montt Montt, President of Chile (1906–1910)
- Ramón Barros Luco, President of Chile (1910–1915)
- Juan Luis Sanfuentes Andonaégui, President of Chile (1915–1920)
- Emiliano Figueroa Larraín, President of Chile (1925–1927)
- Pedro Aguirre Cerda, President of Chile (1938–1941)
- Jorge Alessandri Rodríguez, President of Chile (1958–1964)
- Salvador Allende Gossens, President of Chile (1970–1973)
- Ricardo Lagos Escobar, President of Chile (2000–2006)
- Manuel Pardo, 31st President of Peru
- Miguel Luis Amunátegui, historian
- Francisco Bilbao, writer, philosopher, and politician
- Camilo Henríquez, priest, author, and politician
- José Victorino Lastarria, writer, legislative deputy, senator, diplomat, and finance minister
- Benjamín Vicuña Mackenna, writer, journalist, historian and politician
- Ramón Allende Padín, physician and politician
- Manuel Baquedano, Chilean soldier and politician
- Alberto Cabero, politician
- Pedro Lira, painter and art critic
- José Toribio Medina, bibliographer, prolific writer, and historian
- Arturo Prat, lawyer and navy officer
- Pedro Sienna, playwright, poet, journalist, art critic, and actor
- Antonio Skármeta, author
- Camilo Prieto Concha, member of the Chamber of Deputies
