= Luis Barros =

Luis Barros may refer to:

- Luis Barros Borgoño (1858–1943), Chilean politician, vice-president in 1925
- Luis Barros Méndez (1861–1906), Chilean politician, minister of war in 1903–1904
