= Julio Valenzuela =

Chilean politician

Member of the Chamber of Deputies of Chile
- In office 15 May 1926 – 15 May 1930
- Constituency: 9th departmental district of Maipo, Rancagua, and Cachapoal

Personal details
- Born: 1884
- Died: 1972 (aged 87–88)
- Party: Liberal Party

Julio Valenzuela (1884 – 1972) was a Chilean politician who served in the Chamber of Deputies of Chile as a member of the Liberal Party from 1926 to 1930.

== Personal life ==
Julio Valenzuela was born in 1884, and was educated at the Liceo de Rancagua. He died in 1972.

== Career ==
Valenzuela operated the Rancagua Mill in Rancagua and the El Inglés Mine. He donated land for use by the Don Guanella Home, Third Fire Company, and Julio Valenzuela School in Rancagua. The town of Valenzuela was constructed on land that once belonged to him.

In the 1925 election Valenzuela was elected to the Chamber of Deputies of Chile as a member of the Liberal Party to represent the 9th departmental district of Maipo, Rancagua, and Cachapoal. During his tenure he was a member of the War and Navy commission.

== Works cited ==
- "Julio Valenzuela". Library of the National Congress of Chile. Archived from the original on 19 October 2026.
