= Pedro Gandarillas =

Chilean politician

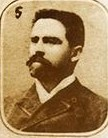
Pedro Nolasco Gandarillas Luco (1839–1891)

Pedro Nolasco Gandarillas Luco (December 25, 1839 - November 11, 1891) was a Chilean politician. He was born in Santiago. He was a graduate of the Instituto Nacional General José Miguel Carrera. He served in the Government of Chile under José Manuel Balmaceda.

Preceded by Ramón Barros Luco	Minister of Finance of Chile; September 5 – October 13, 1885	Succeeded by Hermógenes Pérez de Arce Lopetegui
Preceded by	Minister of Finance of Chile; July 11 – October 23, 1889	Succeeded by Pedro Montt
Preceded by	Minister of Finance of Chile; January 21 – August 11, 1890	Succeeded by
