= Lindorfo Alarcón =

Chilean politician

Lindorfo Alarcón was a Chilean politician. A member of the Democrat Party, he served in the Chamber of Deputies of Chile.
