= Parliamentary Republic =

Parliamentary Republic may refer to:

- Parliamentary republic, a republican form of government with a parliamentary system and a ceremonial or parliament-elected head of state
- History of Chile during the Parliamentary Era (1891–1925)
- French Third Republic (1870–1940)
- French Fourth Republic (1946–1958)
