= José Miguel Valdés =

Chilean political figure and liberal politician

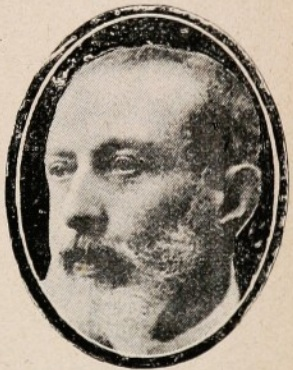
José Miguel Valdés Carrera (Santiago, March 14, 1837-Paris, France, November 5, 1898) was a Chilean farmer and politician.

José Miguel Valdés Carrera (March 14, 1837 - November 5, 1898) was a Chilean political figure and liberal politician, who served several times as minister. José Miguel Valdés was of Basque descent on his mother's side.

He was born in Santiago, the youngest son of Francisco Javier Valdés Aldunate and of Javiera Carrera Fontecilla. He studied at the Seminary of Santiago and completed his studies at the Instituto Nacional. Valdés married Emilia La Jara Alliendeallier, and they had 4 children.

He started his political career by joining the Liberal party and participating in the 1859 Revolution. Most of his life, he dedicated himself to the cultivation of his Hacienda Baracaldo in Santiago. In 1867 he was elected deputy for Santiago (1867-1870) and later re-elected for the period 1888–1891. A firm supporter of President José Manuel Balmaceda, he was appointed minister of War and Navy and of Industry and Public Works in 1889, and of Finance in 1891. The same year Valdés was elected a Senator for Concepcion. At the end of the 1891 Chilean Civil War, he had to seek refuge in the embassy of the United States, and soon afterward was exiled to France. He died in Paris at the age of 61.

== See also ==
- Carrera family

Political offices
Preceded by Ramón Donoso	Minister of War and Navy; 1889	Succeeded by Abraham König
Preceded by Ramón Barros Luco	Minister of Industry and Public Works; 1889-1890	Succeeded by Macario Vial
Preceded by Ismael Pérez Montt	Minister of Finance; 1891	Succeeded by Manuel Arístides Zañartu
