= Luis Barros Borgoño =

Chilean politician (1858–1943)

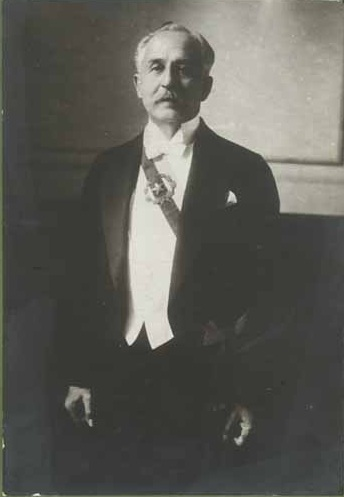

Vice President of Chile
- In office 1 October 1925 – 23 December 1925
- Preceded by: Arturo Alessandri (President)
- Succeeded by: Emiliano Figueroa (President)

Ambassador of Chile to Argentina
- In office 1936 – 24 December 1938
- President: Arturo Alessandri
- Preceded by: Luis Alberto Cariola
- Succeeded by: Sergio Montt Rivas

Minister of the Interior
- In office 1 October 1925 – 2 October 1925
- President: Arturo Alessandri
- Preceded by: Francisco Mardones Otaíza
- Succeeded by: Manuel Véliz

Minister of Foreign Affairs, Worship and Colonization
- In office 28 November 1918 – 8 November 1919
- President: Juan Luis Sanfuentes
- Preceded by: Ruperto Bahamonde
- Succeeded by: Alamiro García-Huidobro
- In office 1894–1894
- President: Jorge Montt
- Preceded by: Ventura Blanco
- Succeeded by: Mariano Sánchez Fontecilla

Minister of Finance
- In office 3 October 1901 – 18 November 1901
- President: Germán Riesco
- Preceded by: Juan Luis Sanfuentes
- Succeeded by: Enrique Villegas Encalada

Mayor of Las Condes
- In office 26 August 1901 – 1919
- Preceded by: Office established
- Succeeded by: Roberto Guzmán Montt

Minister of War and Navy
- In office 24 November 1895 – 18 September 1896
- President: Jorge Montt
- Preceded by: Ismael Valdés
- Succeeded by: Manuel Bulnes Pinto

Minister of War and Navy
- In office 11 March 1892 – 11 June 1892
- President: Jorge Montt
- Preceded by: Ventura Blanco
- Succeeded by: Luis Arteaga

Minister of War and Navy
- In office 29 August 1891 – 31 August 1891
- President: José Manuel Balmaceda
- Preceded by: Nicanor Ugalde
- Succeeded by: Joaquín Walker Martínez

Minister of War and Navy
- In office 7 November 1889 – 20 January 1890
- President: José Manuel Balmaceda
- Preceded by: Ismael Valdés
- Succeeded by: José Miguel Valdés

Personal details
- Parent(s): Manuel Barros Arana; Eugenia Borgoño
- Relatives: Diego Antonio Barros (grandfather); José Manuel Borgoño (grandfather); Diego Barros Arana (uncle); Nicolás Barros Luco and Ramón Barros Luco (first cousins once removed); Manuel Barros Borgoño and Martina Barros Borgoño (siblings)

Luis Barros Borgoño (Latin American Spanish: [lwis ˈβaros βoɾˈɣoɲo]; March 26, 1858 – July 26, 1943) was a Chilean politician who served as Vice President of Chile in 1925.

Born in Santiago, he was the son of Manuel Barros Arana and Eugenia Borgoño Vergara. He graduated as a lawyer in 1880, held a position in the Supreme Court in 1884, was Minister of War and Navy on three occasions (1890, 1892 and 1895–96), was Minister of Foreign Affairs twice (1894 and 1918) and Finance Minister in 1901.

As the conservative candidate in the Chilean presidential election of 1920, he faced the liberal Arturo Alessandri and was defeated by a very slim margin. When Alessandri resigned again on October 1, 1925 Vice President Barros became the Acting President though he technically remained Vice-President until December 23, 1925, when Emiliano Figueroa took the office.

During his brief presidency, a decree was introduced on October the 17th 1925 which sought to encourage productive, distributive, and credit cooperative societies; regarding them as legal persons while also according numerous facilities to them.

Barros was also an author who focused on history. He wrote several volumes including The Muzzi Mission, a Life of Admiral Patricio Lynch and Mission in the Plata, in which he defended his uncle, Diego Barros and his participation in the negotiations with Argentina over Patagonia.

== Biography ==
=== Early life and education ===
Barros was born in Santiago on 26 March 1858, the son of Manuel Barros Arana and Eugenia Borgoño Vergara. He was a nephew of the historian and intellectual Diego Barros Arana. He studied law at the University of Chile, graduating in 1880.

=== Public career ===
Barros taught history at the Instituto Nacional, as well as criminal and civil law. He served as dean of the Faculty of Philosophy and Humanities and taught documentary history at the Instituto Pedagógico. He was also president of the Council of Fine Arts and a member of the Council of Public Instruction. In 1884, he served as a prosecutor and rapporteur of the Supreme Court of Chile. He also founded several public funds and institutions, including those related to agriculture, workers' insurance and public employees.

In politics, Barros served as president of the Liberal Party. He was secretary to General Manuel Baquedano when President José Manuel Balmaceda relinquished control of the government in 1891 during the Chilean Civil War of 1891. Barros served as Minister of War and Navy under Balmaceda from 1889 to 1890, under Baquedano in 1891, and under President Jorge Montt in 1892 and from 1895 to 1896. He also served as Minister of Foreign Affairs under Montt in 1894.

During the administration of Germán Riesco, Barros served as Minister of Finance in 1901, and under Juan Luis Sanfuentes he served as Minister of Foreign Affairs in 1918. He also carried out diplomatic duties in Argentina and was a member of the Permanent Court of International Justice.

Barros was nominated as a candidate in the 1920 Chilean presidential election by the Liberal-Unionist and Conservative sectors. He faced Arturo Alessandri, the Liberal Alliance candidate known as the Lion of Tarapacá. Some Conservatives were cautious in supporting Barros because, although he represented the National Union, he came from a family associated with freethinking liberalism. The election was extremely close: Barros received more votes in the popular tally, while Alessandri secured more electors.

Following Alessandri's resignation in 1925, Barros assumed the vice presidency, serving for more than two months until Emiliano Figueroa took office on 23 December of that year. He later served as Chilean ambassador to Argentina from 1936 to 1938, during Alessandri's second administration.

== Written works ==
Alongside his political career, Barros was an author of several works dealing primarily with historical and international affairs. His works include:

- Curso de historia general
- Historia de la Misión Muzi
- La Liga de las Naciones
- Los tratados de Bolivia
- Vida del Almirante Lynch
- Misión Barros Arana en La Plata (a work in which he defended the role of his uncle, Diego Barros Arana, in negotiations with Argentina)
- La Cuestión del Pacífico y Las Nuevas Orientaciones de Bolivia (1922)
- El Jeneral José Manuel Borgoño (1910)

== Honours and decorations ==
- Grand Cross of the Order of Isabella the Catholic (Spain), 30 August 1896.

== Cabinet ==
Portfolio	Minister	Took office	Left office	Party
Minister of the Interior	Manuel Véliz	2 October 1925	23 October 1925	Military
Minister of Foreign Affairs and Commerce	Jorge Matte Gormaz	2 October 1925	15 October 1925	Liberal
Minister of Foreign Affairs and Commerce	Ernesto Barros Jarpa	15 October 1925	23 October 1925	Liberal
Minister of Justice and Public Instruction	Oscar Fenner	2 October 1925	23 October 1925	Military
Minister of Finance	Guillermo Edwards Matte	2 October 1925	23 October 1925	Liberal
Minister of War	Carlos Ibáñez del Campo	2 October 1925	23 October 1925	Military
Minister of Navy	Braulio Bahamonde	2 October 1925	23 October 1925	Military
Minister of Public Works, Commerce and Transport	Alejandro García Castelblanco	2 October 1925	23 October 1925	Military
Minister of Agriculture, Industry and Colonisation	Luis Correa Vergara	2 October 1925	23 October 1925	Independent
Minister of Hygiene, Assistance, Social Security and Labour	José Santos Salas	2 October 1925	10 October 1925	Independent
Minister of Hygiene, Assistance, Social Security and Labour	Pedro Lautaro Ferrer	10 October 1925	23 October 1925	Independent
