= National Party (Chile, 1857) =

National Party Partido Nacional
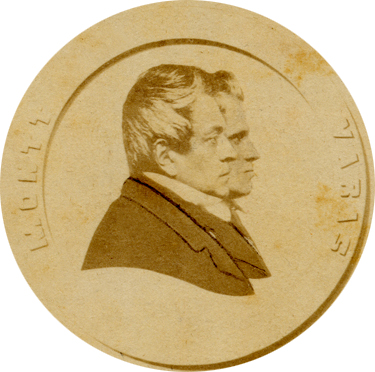
- Leader: Manuel Montt; Antonio Varas; José Joaquín Pérez; Agustín Edwards; Pedro Montt
- Founded: 29 December 1857
- Dissolved: 1925 (de facto); 1930 (de jure)
- Split from: Conservatives
- Merged into: United Liberal Party
- Ideology: Secularism; Liberal conservatism Economic liberalism
- Political position: Centre-right

The National Party (Spanish: Partido Nacional) or Montt-Varist (Spanish: Monttvarista) was a Chilean political party formed in 1857 as a split from the Conservatives by the supporters of President Manuel Montt and Interior Minister Antonio Varas. The National Party had a liberal-conservative ideology and was primarily supported by middle-high businessmen, bankers and journalists. The Welsh-born Edwards family was a bigger financer of the party, along with the aristocratic Balmaceda, who was linked to the Liberal Party. The party never was more than an influential third party, and since the late 1910s its influences declined considerably, stopping from participating to national elections after 1924, finally merging into the United Liberal Party in 1933. The monttvarista National Party is not to be confused with the National Party formed in 1966.

== Electoral history ==
=== Presidential election ===
Election year	Candidate	Votes		Results
Election year	Candidate	# Votes	% Votes	Results
1856	Manuel Montt	207	99.1%	Won
1861	José Joaquín Pérez	214	100%	Won
1866	José Joaquín Pérez	191	88.0%	Won
1871	José Tomás Urmeneta	58	20.4%	Lost
1876	Not contested			Lost
1881	Not contested			Lost
1886	José Francisco Vergara (Note: Official candidate for the Radical Party.)	6	1.8%	Lost
1891	Not contested			Lost
1896	Federico Errázuriz Jr. (Note: Candidate for the Liberal Party (conservative wing).)	137	55.5%	Won
1901	Pedro Montt	83	31.1%	Lost
1906	Pedro Montt	164	62.6%	Won
1910	Ramón Barros (Note: Official candidate for the Liberal Party, elected by unanimity.)	268	100%	Won
1915	Juan Luis Sanfuentes (Note: Official candidate for the Liberal Democratic Party, supported by the Coalición.)	77	50.1%	Won
1920	Luis Barros Borgoño (Note: Candidate for the Liberal Party (conservative wing), supported by the National Union.)	175	50.1%	Lost
1925	Not contested			Lost
1927	Not contested			Lost

=== Congress election ===
Election year	Chamber of Deputies			Senate			Status
Election year	# Votes	% Votes	Seats	# Votes	% Votes	Seats	Status
1864	N/A	25.0%	18 / 72				Minority
1867	N/A	8.3%	6 / 72				Minority
1870	N/A	15.3%	11 / 72				Minority
1873	N/A	5.6%	4 / 72				Minority
1876	N/A	11.1%	12 / 108				Minority
1879	N/A	11.1%	12 / 108				Minority
1882	N/A	13.0%	14 / 108				Minority
1885	N/A	14.2%	16 / 113				Minority
1888	N/A	15.9%	18 / 113				Minority
1891	1,196	1.5%	1 / 94				Minority
1894	455	0.4%	0 / 94				Minority
1897	7,692	5.6%	4 / 94				Minority
1900	8,916	6.0%	6 / 94				Minority
1903	Not contested						Minority
1906	24,169	12.5%	11 / 94				Minority
1909	38,341	17.0%	16 / 94				Minority
1912	35,243	14.2%	10 / 118				Minority
1915	14,530	9.7%	29 / 118	N/A	10.5%	2 / 19	Minority
1918	18,526	9.1%	10 / 118	N/A	7.7%	1 / 13	Minority
1921	8,097	2.7%	4 / 118	N/A		2 / 13	Minority
1924	6,400	3.1%	3 / 118	N/A		3 / 13	Minority

== See also ==
- Category:National Party (Chile, 1857) politicians
