= Ricardo Matte =

Chilean lawyer and politician (1860–1913)

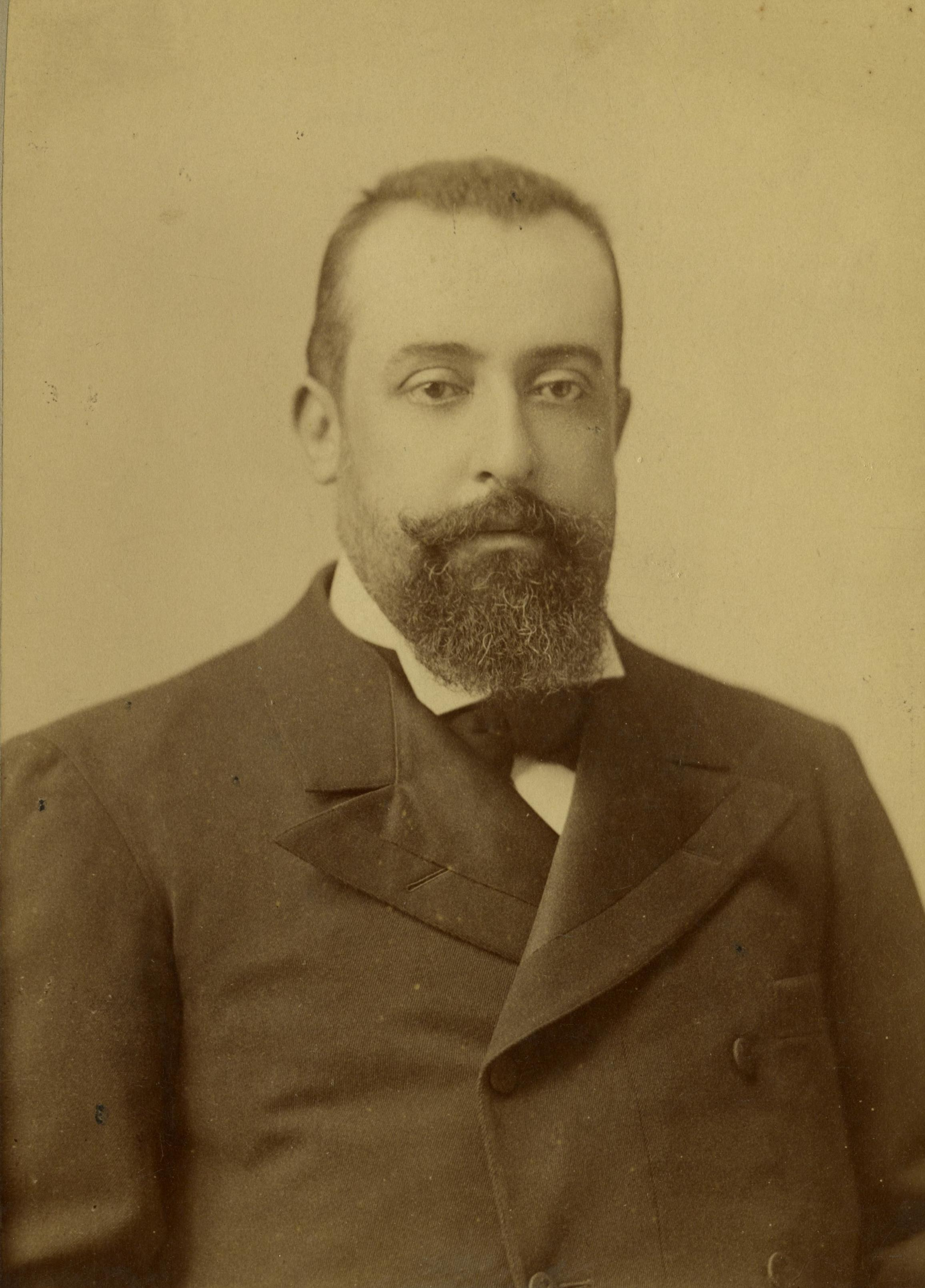

President of the Senate
- In office 1909–1912
- In office 1907–1908

Member of the Senate
- In office 15 May 1912 – August 1913
- Constituency: Santiago
- In office 1900 – 15 May 1912
- Constituency: Chiloé Province

Minister of the Interior
- In office 1 September 1903 – 23 October 1903
- President: Germán Riesco

Minister of War and Navy
- In office 7 April 1903 – 1 September 1903
- President: Germán Riesco

Minister of War and Navy
- In office 27 November 1899 – 3 November 1900

Member of the Chamber of Deputies
- In office 1891–1900
- Constituency: Ancud, Quinchao and Castro

Personal details
- Born: March 1860 Santiago, Chile
- Died: August 1913 (aged 53) Santiago, Chile
- Party: Conservative Party
- Spouse: Luisa Amunátegui Reyes
- Children: 7
- Parent(s): Domingo Matte Mesías; Rosario Pérez Vargas
- Education: Instituto Nacional; University of Chile
- Profession: Lawyer

José Adolfo Ricardo Matte Pérez (March 1860 – August 1913) was a Chilean lawyer and Conservative politician who served as a member of the Chamber of Deputies of Chile, as a senator for Chiloé and Santiago, as President of the Senate of Chile, and as a minister of state.

== Early life ==
Matte was born in Santiago in March 1860 to Domingo Matte Mesías and Rosario Pérez Vargas. He studied humanities at the Instituto Nacional and later law at the University of Chile, qualifying as a lawyer.

He married Luisa Amunátegui Reyes, with whom he had seven children.

Before entering national politics, Matte served as a municipal councillor in Santiago. He was also a rentier.

== Political career ==
A member of the Conservative Party, Matte was elected to the Chamber of Deputies for Ancud, Quinchao and Castro for the 1891–1894 parliamentary period. He was reelected for the same constituency for the 1894–1897 and 1897–1900 terms.

During his service in the Chamber, Matte was a member of the permanent committees for war and navy, ecclesiastical affairs and internal police. He also served on the Conservative Commission during the 1897–1898 recess. He was second vice president of the Chamber from 29 December 1897 to 21 December 1898 and first vice president from 21 December 1898 to 6 July 1899, serving again in the latter position from 14 October to 16 December 1899.

Matte served as Minister of War and Navy from 27 November 1899 to 3 November 1900. He returned to the ministry under President Germán Riesco, serving from 7 April to 1 September 1903. On the latter date, he became Minister of the Interior, remaining in office until 23 October 1903.

In 1900, Matte was elected to the Senate for Chiloé Province. He represented the province through the 1900–1906, 1906–1909 and 1909–1912 parliamentary periods. During these terms, he served on several permanent committees, including those for public works, budgets, finance, industry and public works, worship and colonization, public education, and war and navy. He also chaired the finance and budget committees.

Matte served as vice president of the Senate from 5 June 1906 to 26 August 1908, again from 17 December 1908 to 18 January 1909, and from 29 December 1909 to 8 August 1911. On 8 August 1911, he became President of the Senate of Chile.

In 1912, Matte was elected senator for Santiago for the 1912–1918 parliamentary period. He served as provisional president of the Senate from 15 May to 3 June 1912 and was elected president on 3 June, remaining in the position until his death in August 1913. He also chaired the permanent committee for finance.

Matte died in Santiago in August 1913 while serving as senator and president of the Senate.
