= Federico Errázuriz Echaurren =

Chilean politician (1850–1901)

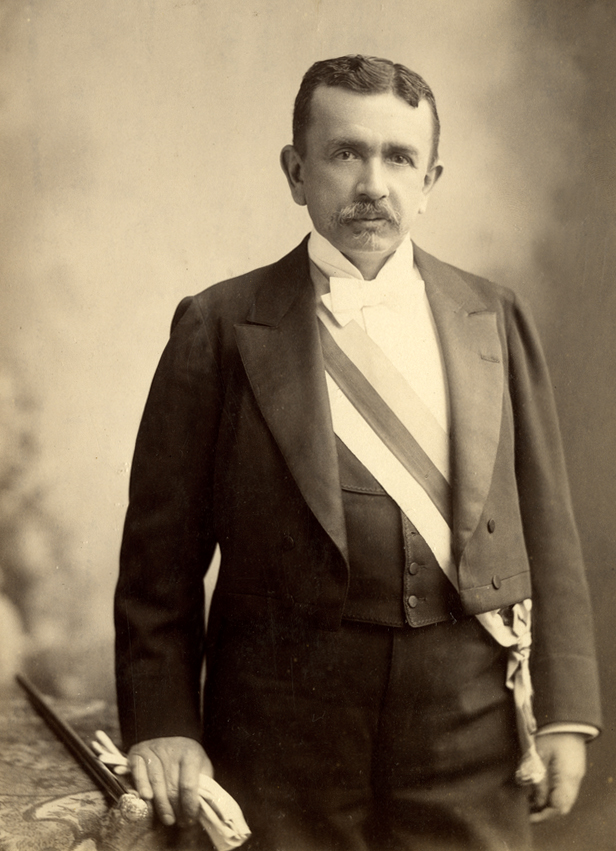

13th President of Chile
- In office September 18, 1896 – July 12, 1901
- Vice President: Aníbal Zañartu
- Preceded by: Jorge Montt
- Succeeded by: Aníbal Zañartu

Personal details
- Born: November 16, 1850 Santiago, Chile
- Died: July 12, 1901 (aged 50) Valparaíso, Chile
- Party: Liberal
- Spouse: Gertrudis Echeñique Mujica

Federico Errázuriz Echaurren (Santiago, November 16, 1850 – Valparaíso, July 12, 1901) was a Chilean politician who served as the 13th president of Chile.

== Early life ==
He was son of the president Federico Errázuriz Zañartu and of Eulogia Echaurren García-Huidobro. He studied at San Ignacio School of Santiago de Chile and in the National Institute of Santiago, where he received a bachelor's degree. He was joined the University of Chile where he became a lawyer on March 23, 1873.

In 1875 he married Gertrudis Echeñique Mujica, a direct descendant of the governor of Chile Martín de Mujica, of whom she was the last heir of the El Huique; They had six children: Juan José, Elena, Federico, Eulogia, Jorge and María Jesús.

Errázuriz Echaurren joined the Liberal Party and started his political life in 1876, when he was elected as a deputy for Constitución. He was reelected in 1879 and was characterized as a centrist politician. He did not participate in the campaigns of the War of the Pacific, preferring instead to remain in his hacienda, but during the religious controversies between Church and State under President Domingo Santa María, he joined the conservative forces. In August 1890, President José Manuel Balmaceda named him Minister of War and Navy, under the conciliation cabinet of Belisario Prats; but when Prats resigned his position, so did Errázuriz, and both joined the opposition. In 1891 he was one of the signers of the Act of Deposition of Presidente Balmaceda. Even so, he did not participate in the 1891 Chilean Civil War.

After the end of the civil war, he was elected deputy for Cauquenes and Constitución (1891–1894). His ill-health forced him to travel to Germany, in search of specialists. During a year and a half, he travelled through Europe, even visiting Pope Leo XIII. He returned to Chile and in 1894 was elected Senator for Maule and designed Minister of Justice and Public Instruction, under President Jorge Montt.

== Presidency ==
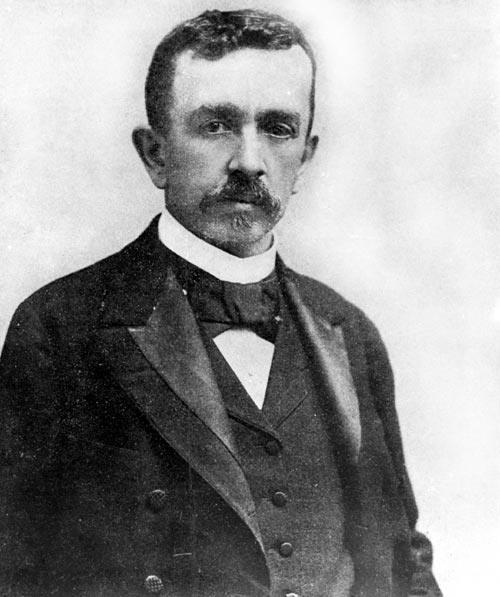
President Errázuriz Echaurren (1894)

After a very contested election, Errázuriz Echaurren was elected President and assumed power on September 18, 1896. He took over office at the age of 46, but by then he already was showing the symptoms of the illness that was going to kill him before the end of his mandate. Both his supporters and the opposition considered him a man of great political cunning, but while his supporters saw him as a true patriot, the opposition pictured him as a corrupt politician capable of the worst excesses. These characterizations made his rule difficult from the start, since he had a majority in the Senate but not in the Chamber of Deputies. He received a country where the economic situation had steadily worsened due to the progressive crisis of the nitrate industry and the associated unemployment and social crisis caused by it; while the international relationships with Perú, Bolivia, and Argentina were also in a critical state. To counteract the instability he tried to broaden the political consensus of his supporting coalition by forming a cabinet made up of three liberals and three conservatives, with the Liberal Aníbal Zañartu as Minister of the Interior. This seemingly impeccable arrangement only lasted for two months. In what was the norm during the governments of the period, Errázuriz Echaurren went on to have 17 cabinets during his administration.

Between 1896 and 1897, he named Carlos Antúnez as his Minister of the Interior and charged him with guaranteeing free and "clean" elections. Antúnez was in charge until after the general election of March 1897, considered his mission accomplished afterwards and resigned. These elections were greeted with general acceptance, but did not change the political support for the government, so Errázuriz Echaurren had to continue trying to achieve a balance, to maintain a semblance of political stability. In the course of this search, Errázuriz Echaurren became closer and closer to the Conservative Party, until in 1898 he named Carlos Walker Martínez, president of the Conservatives as Minister of the Interior. Nonetheless, he remained always loyal to the coalition that elected him, and for example never allowed any member of the Radical party into any of his cabinets. Errázuriz's responses to the cabinet crisis, elections and in general to any problem within his administration was always consistent. He never took any decision without first consulting his political basis in congress, and always subordinated himself to the will of the political parties.

=== Public policies ===
Errázuriz's administration was characterized by a marked advancement in public education. Under his direction several institutions for the development of health professionals were created, such as courses for matrons and nurses, the Professional School for Girls of Valparaíso, the Commercial Institute of Santiago, and new high schools in Santiago and Iquique. This administration also contributed with new tram systems in Santiago, Valparaíso, San Felipe and San Bernardo. Errázuriz Echaurren contracted the new sewerage system for Santiago, and the water reservoir of Peñuelas, which still provides the water for Valparaíso.

He faced his biggest problems in the area of monetary policy. The much-wanted return to the metallic conversion, to which he was opposed but which was favored by the parliamentary majorities, was shelved due to the threat of a war with Argentina. The delay of the measure until 1902 pushed the banking system to near collapse, forcing the government to issue and circulate paper money.

=== Argentine problem ===
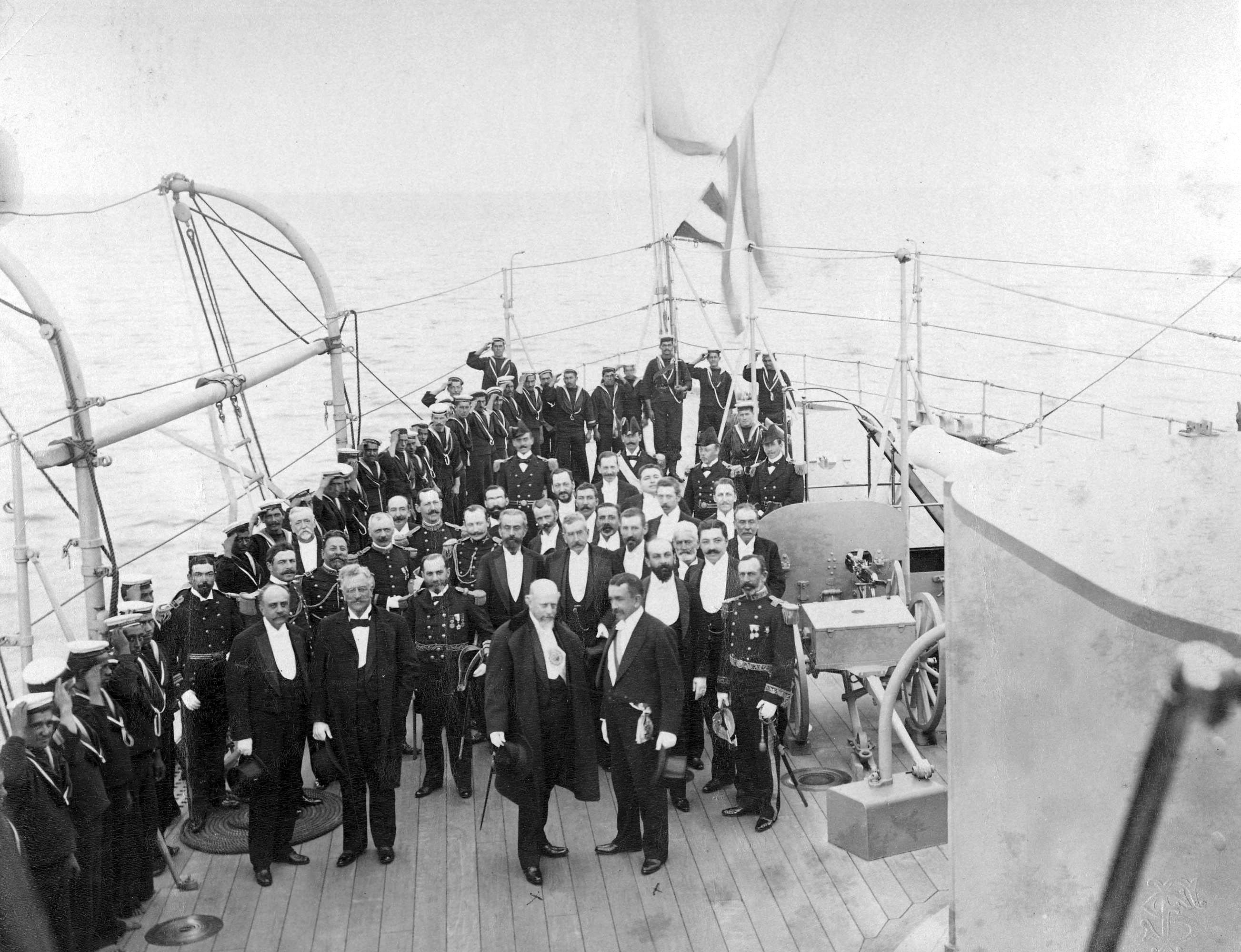
President Errázuriz with president of Argentina, Julio A. Roca, at the straits (1899)

The biggest problem that the administration had to face was on the international area. Chile and Argentina were on the brink of war, due to long-standing border disputes stemming from the peace treaty of 1881, the situation of the Puna de Atacama (a disputed territory formerly owned by Bolivia and claimed by both countries) and an ongoing naval arms race. President Errázuriz was avowedly pacifist, but at one point both countries got to the point of calling up their reserve soldiers. The final solution was to submit the problem to an arbitration by the King of England, the adjudication of which was not resolved until 1902, during the administration of Germán Riesco, President Errázuriz's cousin and successor.

To celebrate the decision to arbitrate and avoid war, President Errázuriz and Argentinian President Julio Argentino Roca held an international meeting in the Strait of Magellan. This meeting, known as the Embrace of the Strait, took place in front of the city of Punta Arenas on February 15, 1899.

=== Succession controversy ===
Like most presidents of the time, he became involved early in the election of his successor. The Liberal-Conservative Coalition that supported him went on to proclaim Germán Riesco, cousin and brother-in-law of President Errázuriz, as their candidate on March 8, 1901. The President responded in a public letter:

[...] as I have the firm purpose of not intervening in any political campaign and I don't have or want to have any candidate, I am firmly resolved to prevent the participation of any member of this administration in the upcoming elections.

=== Health problems and death ===
Errázuriz's ill-health continued to plague him during all his period. Before his election, he already had had to travel to Germany in 1893 for treatment, and the death of his oldest son from tuberculosis in 1897 weakened him further. On June 11, 1900, he had to delegate his mandate to Elías Fernández Albano, the Vice President, so he could travel again to seek medical advice. He reassumed his duties on October 11 of the same year, but died suddenly of cerebral thrombosis on July 12, 1901, while in Valparaíso. He was constitutionally replaced by his Minister of the Interior Aníbal Zañartu, who assumed as Vice President for the remainder of his mandate.

== Cabinet ==
Portfolio	Minister	Took office	Left office	Party
Zañartu-Putron Ministry
Minister of the Interior	Aníbal Zañartu	18 September 1896	20 November 1896	Liberal
Minister of Foreign Affairs	Enrique de Putron	18 September 1896	20 November 1896	Conservative
Minister of Justice and Public Instruction	Adolfo Ibáñez	18 September 1896	20 November 1896	Liberal Democratic
Minister of War and Navy	Manuel Bulnes Pinto	18 September 1896	20 November 1896	Liberal
Minister of Finance	José Francisco Fabres	18 September 1896	20 November 1896	Conservative
Minister of Industry and Public Works	Francisco Baeza Sotomayor	18 September 1896	20 November 1896	National
Antúnez-Morla Ministry
Minister of the Interior	Carlos Antúnez González	20 November 1896	26 June 1897	Liberal Democratic
Minister of Foreign Affairs	Carlos Morla Vicuña	28 December 1896	26 June 1897	Liberal
Minister of Justice and Public Instruction	Federico Puga Borne	20 November 1896	11 May 1897	Liberal
Minister of Justice and Public Instruction	José Domingo Amunátegui Rivera	11 May 1897	26 June 1897	National
Minister of War and Navy	Elías Fernández Albano	20 November 1896	26 June 1897	National
Minister of Finance	Justiniano Sotomayor	20 November 1896	26 June 1897	National
Minister of Industry and Public Works	Francisco de Borja Valdés	20 November 1896	26 June 1897	Liberal
Orrego-Morla Ministry
Minister of the Interior	Augusto Orrego Luco	26 June 1897	25 August 1897	National
Minister of Foreign Affairs	Carlos Morla Vicuña	26 June 1897	25 August 1897	Liberal
Minister of Justice and Public Instruction	José Domingo Amunátegui Rivera	26 June 1897	25 August 1897	National
Minister of War and Navy	Benjamín Vergara Echavarría	26 June 1897	25 August 1897	Liberal
Minister of Finance	Juan Tocornal Doursther	26 June 1897	25 August 1897	Liberal
Minister of Industry and Public Works	Belisario Prats Bello	26 June 1897	25 August 1897	Liberal
Valdés-Silva Ministry
Minister of the Interior	Antonio Valdés Cuevas	25 August 1897	14 April 1898	Liberal
Minister of Foreign Affairs	Raimundo Silva Cruz	25 August 1897	14 April 1898	Liberal Democratic
Minister of Justice and Public Instruction	José Domingo Amunátegui Rivera	25 August 1897	14 April 1898	National
Minister of War and Navy	Carlos Alberto Palacios Zapata	25 August 1897	23 December 1897	Liberal
Minister of War and Navy	Patricio Larraín Alcalde	23 December 1897	14 April 1898	Conservative
Minister of Finance	Elías Fernández Albano	25 August 1897	23 December 1897	National
Minister of Finance	Alberto González Errázuriz	23 December 1897	14 April 1898	Conservative
Minister of Industry and Public Works	Domingo de Toro Herrera	25 August 1897	16 November 1897	Liberal
Minister of Industry and Public Works	Emilio Orrego Luco	16 November 1897	23 December 1897	Liberal
Minister of Industry and Public Works	Julio Bañados Espinosa	23 December 1897	14 April 1898	Liberal Democratic
Walker-Latorre Ministry
Minister of the Interior	Carlos Walker Martínez	14 April 1898	27 June 1899	Conservative
Minister of Foreign Affairs	Juan José Latorre	14 April 1898	19 December 1898	Liberal Democratic
Minister of Foreign Affairs	Ventura Blanco Viel	19 December 1898	27 June 1899	Conservative
Minister of Justice and Public Instruction	Augusto Orrego Luco	14 April 1898	18 June 1898	National
Minister of Justice and Public Instruction	Juan Antonio Orrego	18 June 1898	27 June 1898	Liberal
Minister of Justice and Public Instruction	Carlos Alberto Palacios Zapata	27 June 1898	27 June 1899	Liberal
Minister of War and Navy	Patricio Larraín Alcalde	14 April 1898	5 May 1898	Conservative
Minister of War and Navy	Ventura Blanco Viel	5 May 1898	19 December 1898	Conservative
Minister of War and Navy	Carlos Concha Subercaseaux	19 December 1898	27 June 1899	Conservative
Minister of Finance	Darío Zañartu	14 April 1898	18 June 1898	National
Minister of Finance	Rafael Sotomayor Gaete	28 June 1898	27 June 1899	National
Minister of Industry and Public Works	Emilio Bello Codesido	14 April 1898	5 November 1898	Liberal Democratic
Minister of Industry and Public Works	Arturo Alessandri	19 December 1898	27 June 1899	Liberal
Silva-Puga Ministry
Minister of the Interior	Raimundo Silva Cruz	27 June 1899	2 September 1899	Liberal Democratic
Minister of Foreign Affairs	Federico Puga Borne	27 June 1899	2 September 1899	Liberal
Minister of Justice and Public Instruction	Francisco Herboso España	27 June 1899	2 September 1899	Liberal Democratic
Minister of War and Navy	Javier Ángel Figueroa	27 June 1899	2 September 1899	Liberal
Minister of Finance	Federico Pinto Izarra	27 June 1899	2 September 1899	Liberal
Minister of Industry and Public Works	Daniel Rioseco	27 June 1899	2 September 1899	Liberal
Sotomayor-Errázuriz Ministry
Minister of the Interior	Rafael Sotomayor Gaete	2 September 1899	27 November 1899	National
Minister of Foreign Affairs	Rafael Errázuriz Urmeneta	2 September 1899	27 November 1899	Conservative
Minister of Justice and Public Instruction	Francisco Herboso España	2 September 1899	27 November 1899	Liberal Democratic
Minister of War and Navy	Carlos Concha Subercaseaux	2 September 1899	22 November 1899	Conservative
Minister of Finance	Manuel Salinas González	2 September 1899	27 November 1899	Liberal Democratic
Minister of Industry and Public Works	Gregorio Antonio Pinochet	2 September 1899	30 October 1899	Liberal
Minister of Industry and Public Works	José Florencio Valdés Cuevas	30 October 1899	27 November 1899	Liberal
Fernández-Errázuriz Ministry
Minister of the Interior	Elías Fernández Albano	27 November 1899	3 November 1900	National
Minister of Foreign Affairs	Rafael Errázuriz Urmeneta	2 September 1899	14 October 1900	Conservative
Minister of Foreign Affairs	Manuel Salinas González	14 October 1900	3 November 1900	Liberal Democratic
Minister of Justice and Public Instruction	Francisco Herboso España	2 September 1899	14 October 1900	Liberal Democratic
Minister of Justice and Public Instruction	Emilio Bello Codesido	14 October 1900	3 November 1900	Liberal Democratic
Minister of War and Navy	Ricardo Matte	27 November 1899	3 November 1900	Conservative
Minister of Finance	Manuel Salinas González	2 September 1899	14 October 1900	Liberal Democratic
Minister of Finance	Ramón Eufrasio Santelices	14 October 1900	3 November 1900	Conservative
Minister of Industry and Public Works	José Florencio Valdés Cuevas	30 October 1899	3 August 1900	Liberal
Minister of Industry and Public Works	Abraham Gacitúa Brieba	3 August 1900	14 October 1900	Liberal
Minister of Industry and Public Works	Rafael Orrego	14 October 1900	3 November 1900	Liberal
Sánchez-Bello Ministry
Minister of the Interior	Mariano Sánchez Fontecilla	3 November 1900	27 December 1900	Liberal
Minister of Foreign Affairs	Emilio Bello Codesido	3 November 1900	27 December 1900	Liberal Democratic
Minister of Justice and Public Instruction	Francisco Herboso España	3 November 1900	27 December 1900	Liberal Democratic
Minister of War and Navy	Arturo Besa Navarro	3 November 1900	27 December 1900	National
Minister of Finance	Nicolás González Errázuriz	3 November 1900	27 December 1900	Conservative
Minister of Industry and Public Works	Manuel Alejandro Covarrubias Ortúzar	3 November 1900	27 December 1900	Conservative
Orrego-Bello Ministry
Minister of the Interior	Juan Antonio Orrego	27 December 1900	14 March 1901	Liberal
Minister of Foreign Affairs	Emilio Bello Codesido	27 December 1900	23 February 1901	Liberal Democratic
Minister of Foreign Affairs	Raimundo Silva Cruz	23 February 1901	14 March 1901	Liberal Democratic
Minister of Justice and Public Instruction	Francisco Herboso España	27 December 1900	4 February 1901	Liberal Democratic
Minister of Justice and Public Instruction	Ramón Antonio Vergara Donoso	4 February 1901	14 March 1901	Liberal Democratic
Minister of War and Navy	Arturo Besa Navarro	27 December 1900	14 March 1901	National
Minister of Finance	Nicolás González Errázuriz	27 December 1900	14 March 1901	Conservative
Minister of Industry and Public Works	Manuel Alejandro Covarrubias Ortúzar	27 December 1900	14 March 1901	Conservative
Amunátegui-Silva Ministry
Minister of the Interior	José Domingo Amunátegui Rivera	14 March 1901	1 May 1901	National
Minister of Foreign Affairs	Raimundo Silva Cruz	14 March 1901	1 May 1901	Liberal Democratic
Minister of Justice and Public Instruction	Ventura Carvallo	14 March 1901	1 May 1901	Liberal
Minister of War and Navy	Vicente Palacios Baeza	14 March 1901	1 May 1901	Liberal
Minister of Finance	Manuel Fernández García	15 March 1901	1 May 1901	National
Minister of Industry and Public Works	José Ramón Nieto Nieto	14 March 1901	1 May 1901	Liberal Democratic
Zañartu-Rodríguez Ministry
Minister of the Interior	Aníbal Zañartu	1 May 1901	18 September 1901	Liberal
Minister of Foreign Affairs	Luis Martiniano Rodríguez	1 May 1901	18 September 1901	Liberal
Minister of Justice and Public Instruction	Ramón Escobar Escobar	1 May 1901	23 August 1901	Liberal Democratic
Minister of War and Navy	Wenceslao Bulnes Riquelme	1 May 1901	18 September 1901	Liberal
Minister of Finance	Juan Luis Sanfuentes	1 May 1901	18 September 1901	Liberal Democratic
Minister of Industry and Public Works	Joaquín Fernández Blanco	1 May 1901	18 September 1901	Liberal Democratic

== Legacy ==
In the late 18th century, zoologist and paleontologist Rodolfo Amando Philippi named a newly discovered species of plant after Errázuriz Echaurren: Errazurizia glandulifera, a "curious leguminous plant with 'long rat-tail spikes of flowers of a peculiar purple and yellow' with an 'incense-like' scent.

== See also ==
- Martín de Mujica y Buitrón
- President of Chile

Political offices
Preceded by José Velásquez	Minister of War and Navy; 1890	Succeeded by José Francisco Gana
Preceded by Francisco Antonio Pinto Cruz	Minister of Justice and Public Instruction; 1894	Succeeded by Osvaldo Rengifo
Preceded by Jorge Montt	President of Chile; 1896–1901	Succeeded by Aníbal Zañartu
