= Coalition (Chile) =

The Coalition (Note: Also called, though rarely, **Conservative Coalition**) was a Chilean political coalition created in 1891, at the end of the Civil War, in opposition to the Liberal Alliance. The Coalition was made up of the Conservative Party (the main pole of attraction of the grouping), Democrats, Nationals, and various liberal factions depending on the electoral and political circumstances of the moment. Together with its rival, the Liberal Alliance, it formed a sort of two-party system during the period of the Chilean parliamentary era.

== Presidential candidacies supported by the Coalition ==
- 1891 - Jorge Montt Álvarez (chosen as president thanks to an agreement between all the political parties of his candidacy)
- 1896 – Federico Errázuriz Echaurren (chosen as president)
- 1901 – Pedro Montt Montt (not chosen)
- 1906 – Fernando Lazcano (not chosen)
- 1910 – Ramón Barros Luco (chosen as president thanks to an agreement between all the political parties of his candidacy)
- 1915 – Juan Luis Sanfuentes Andonaegui (chosen as president)
- 1920 – Luis Barros Borgoño (not chosen)

=== Electoral Results (1891-1924) ===
Number of parliament members and senators

Year of election of parliament members	1891	1894	1897	1900	1903	1906	1909	1912	1915	1918	1921	1924
Liberal Alliance	54	66	26	42	38	53	52	62	53	67	68	75
Coalition	40	28	68	52	56	41	43	56	65	51	48	43
Max number of parliament seats	94	94	94	94	94	94	95	118	118	118	116	118

Year of election of senators	1891	1894	1897	1900	1903	1906	1909	1912	1915	1918	1921	1924
Liberal Alliance	23	22	14	16	9	7	17	18	21	24	24	23
Coalition	9	10	18	16	23	22	15	19	16	13	13	14
Max number of senators	32	32	32	32	32	29	32	37	37	37	37	37

== See also ==
- Conservative Party (Chile)

== Sources ==
The original version of this article draws heavily on the corresponding article in the Spanish-language Wikipedia, which was accessed in the version of 8 June 2007.
