= Germán Riesco =

Chilean political figure

Germán Riesco Errázuriz
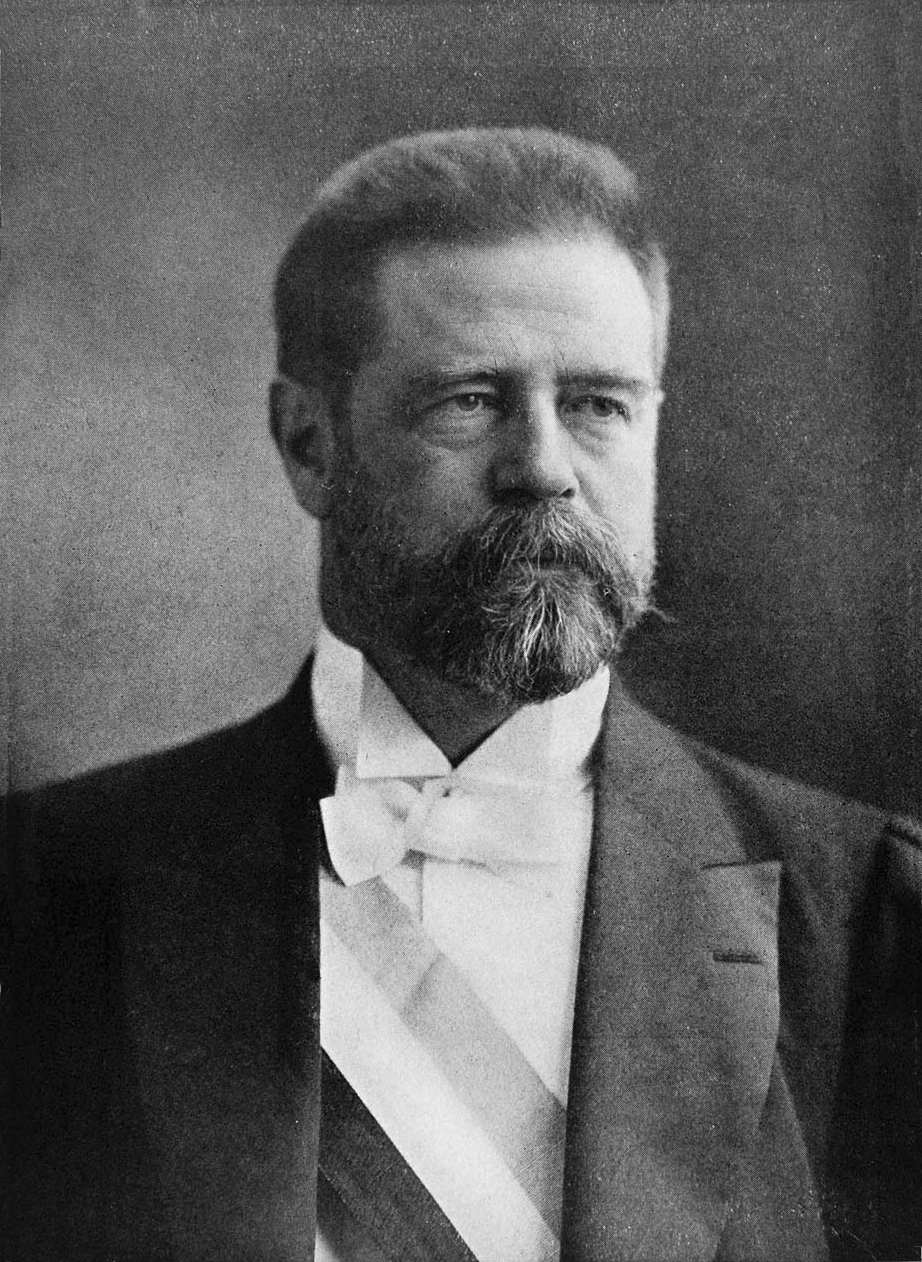
- Germán Riesco, c. 1906

14th President of Chile
- In office September 18, 1901 – September 18, 1906
- Preceded by: Aníbal Zañartu Zañartu
- Succeeded by: Pedro Montt Montt

Personal details
- Born: May 28, 1854 Rancagua, Chile
- Died: December 8, 1916 (aged 62) Santiago, Chile
- Party: Liberal
- Spouse: María Errázuriz Echaurren

Germán Riesco Errázuriz (Spanish pronunciation: [xeɾˈman ˈrjesko]; May 28, 1854 – December 8, 1916) was a Chilean political figure, and he served as President of Chile between 1901 and 1906.

== Early life ==
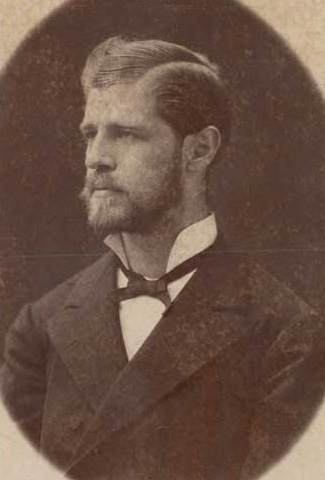
Germán Riesco (1875)

He was born in Rancagua, the son of Mauricio Riesco, a Spanish merchant and of Carlota Errázuriz Zañartu, sister of President Federico Errázuriz Zañartu, of Basque descent. He studied at the Seminario Conciliar and at the University of Chile. At the age of 17 (four years before graduating as a lawyer) he obtained his first public job as a clerk at the ministry of Justice, in order to help support his family financially.

He graduated as a lawyer on April 19, 1875, and was promoted to chief clerk at the ministry in 1880. The same year he married his cousin, María Errázuriz Echaurren, thus becoming brother-in-law to future president Federico Errázuriz Echaurren. He became clerk of the Appeals Court of Santiago in 1891, and clerk of the Supreme Court in 1897. He retired from the judiciary in 1898, to dedicate himself to private practice.

== Presidency ==
Germán Riesco's first incursion into politics was when he was elected as a senator for Talca in 1900. After the sudden death of president Federico Errázuriz Echaurren and due to the proximity of the presidential elections, he was proclaimed candidate by the Liberal Alliance, on March 8, 1901. This alliance was formed by the radicals, the democrats, the Balmacedists and the liberals, even though Riesco Errázuriz was more of a Conservative.

From the beginning his candidacy was strongly opposed by the clerical-conservative groups. Their newspaper El Porvenir led a campaign accusing him of being a "threat against religion". Nonetheless, he was elected by a huge majority of votes, thanks mainly to the fact that he had almost no political exposure, since most of his life had been spent in the judiciary. He himself summarized his appeal by saying that he wasn't a threat to anybody. He assumed on September 18, 1901.

=== Public policies ===
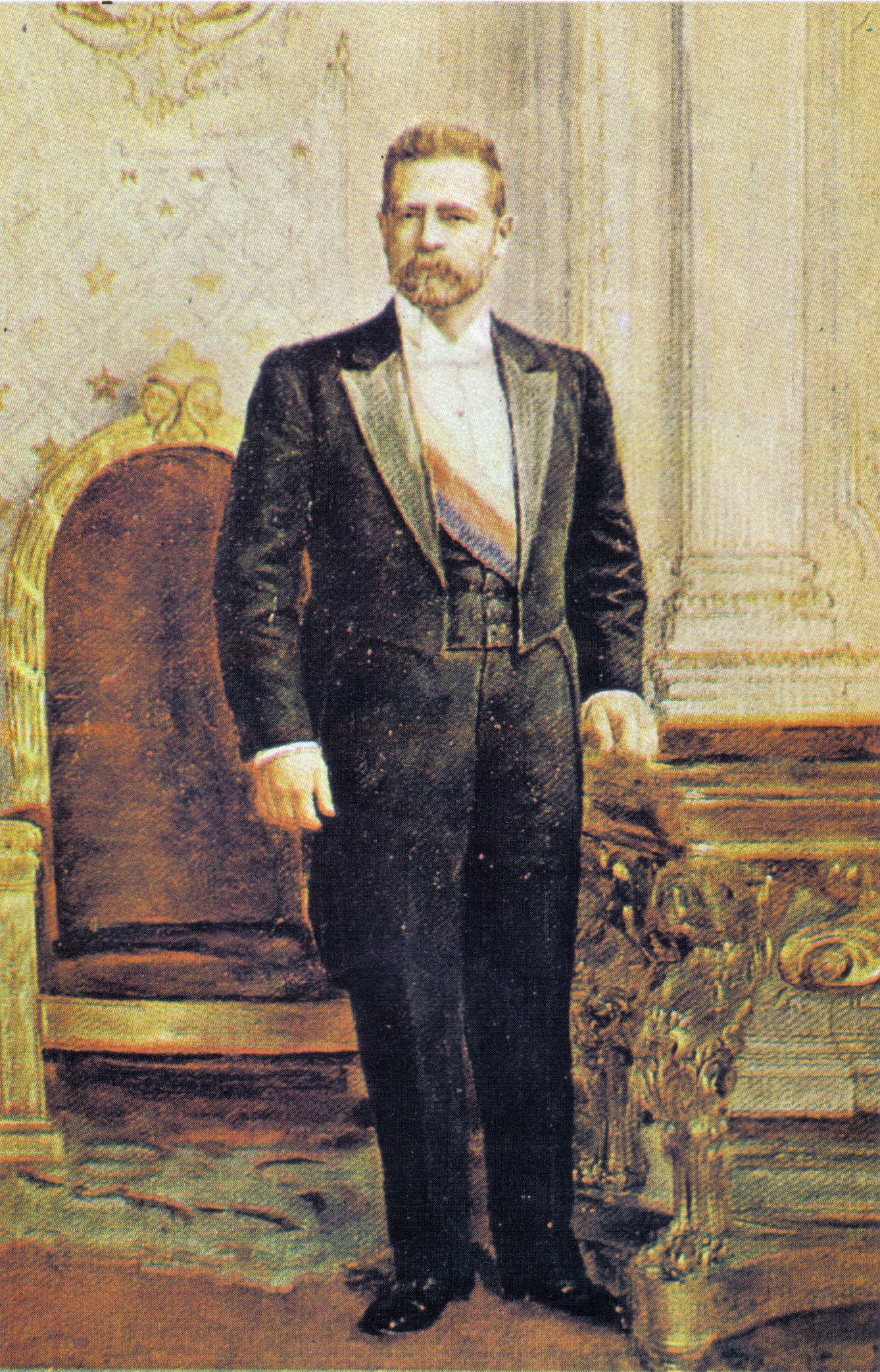
Portrait of President Riesco

As president Riesco was faced with crippling parliamentary divisions. He was forced to appoint no fewer than 17 different governments, each lasting an average of just three and a half months. Even though he had been elected with the support of the Liberal Alliance, he was deserted by them and had to seek the support of the Conservative Coalition (his former opponents). In the end, he had to switch back and forth between both groups in order to complete his term. The result was that since he lacked a congressional majority of his own, he was forced to name caretaker ministers, lacking efficacy or permanence.

As a former member of the judiciary, his principal efforts were channeled towards legal reforms. He managed to establish a new Code of Civil Procedure (1902) which is still in force today, and a Code of Penal Procedure (1906), which lasted almost 100 years. In 1905 he began construction of the new building for the Supreme Court, that was finished in 1911. He concluded several important public works, such as the sewers for the city of Santiago and the new network of electrical trams. He greatly expanded secondary education, especially for women, and doubled the number of Normal Schools for the preparation of new teachers.

In 1906, a housing law was passed with the intention of improving housing conditions and promote the construction of new homes.

Due to the rising inflation, he was forced to refuse a return to the metallic conversion, and to authorize a new emission of paper money. This measure caused a dramatic fall in the exchange rate and higher inflation, which in turn gave way to higher social unrest.

=== International situation ===
On the international stage, at the end of 1901, Chile and Argentina were on the brink of war, due to border disputes. There was an ongoing naval arms race, and both countries called their reserve soldiers. Nonetheless, diplomacy prevailed, and both countries signed the May Treaties on May 28, 1902, followed by arbitration on Patagonia, on November 20 of the same year. These treaties were complemented by the union of the telegraphic lines of both countries, with commonality of tariffs.

He signed a final peace treaty with Bolivia on October 20, 1904, putting an official end to the War of the Pacific. He also re-established diplomatic relations with Peru in 1906, in order to move ahead on the solution of the Tacna and Arica controversy; and gave the first impulse to establishing a claim to Antarctica, by issuing a law regimenting seal-hunting there.

== Social unrest ==
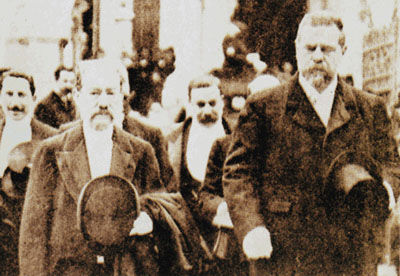
President Riesco, accompanied by Abdon Cifuentes, leaves congress (1906)

During his administration, the so-called "social question" suddenly became critical. Between 1903 and 1905, there were a great many strikes in different areas: miners, ship-loaders and railroad workers in the north of the country; house-painters, tanners, postal workers, policemen, garbage collectors and bus drivers in Santiago; coal miners in La Calera, Lebu, Lota and Coronel, ship-loaders in Valparaíso; most of which ended in deaths and injuries of the protesters.

=== Meat riots ===
On October 22, 1905, some of the poorest people in Santiago organized a march to protest for the high price of meat. The price of meat was kept artificially high by the government, by means of the combination of a special tariff applied to cattle imports from Argentina, in order to protect the domestic producers, and high inflation. These factors put the price of the product beyond the financial means of a high percentage of the population. By the time the march had arrived peacefully to La Moneda and asked for an audience with President Riesco, it had already swelled to about 25 to 30 thousand people.

The people started to grow impatient when the president didn't appear, and when the police tried to dissolve them, they fought back and tried to storm the presidential palace. The police responded by shooting at the crowd, and riots ensued. The violence lasted for almost a week, with widespread riots and looting, in what was called the Meat riots or the red week. Between 200 and 250 protesters were killed over this period. This revolt emphasized that the social problems were far more serious than what the authorities believed.

=== Antofagasta general strike ===
A few months later, a similar revolt took place in Antofagasta. The workers that were laying the rails for the Antofagasta-Bolivia railroad presented a letter of demands to management, that was completely refused by the company. As a result, a general strike was called. The previous experience with the Meat riots alerted the government, that decided to send in the Esmeralda regiment and the cruise-ship Blanco Encalada to reinforce the local forces.

On February 6, 1906, approximately 3 thousand workers gathered in the public square of Antofagasta to protest in favor of his demands. The troops opened fire on the unarmed workers, causing approximately 58 deaths and more than 300 injured.

== Valparaiso earthquake ==
The earthquake had been announced ten days earlier by the chief of the Navy Metheorological Office. August 16, 1906, started as a very clear day, but in the afternoon started to drizzle. As the sun was setting, and when most of the people were having their suppers, came the first shock. It lasted for about 4 minutes.

After the first shock, people started to look for survivors. After approximately fifteen minutes, the second shock hit the port. This one was shorter, approximately a minute, but far stronger than the first one. It completed the destruction of the city and caused most of the victims. Most of the city was leveled, and some looting happened. The governor decreed martial law and any looter caught in the act was shot immediately.

With the total interruption of the communications, the city was isolated. The first news arrived to Santiago (located only 120 kilometers inland) on the afternoon of the 17. Three days later, on the 20, the ministers of Interior and War managed to arrive to the port. President Riesco and the newly elected Pedro Montt arrived on the 25. They had to travel by train, on foot and by horseback in order to arrive to the destroyed port.

== Cabinet ==
Portfolio	Minister	Took office	Left office	Party
Barros-Yáñez Ministry
Minister of the Interior	Ramón Barros Luco	18 September 1901	18 November 1901	Liberal
Minister of Foreign Affairs	Eliodoro Yáñez	18 September 1901	18 November 1901	Liberal
Minister of Justice and Public Instruction	Manuel Egidio Ballesteros	18 September 1901	18 November 1901	Liberal Democratic
Minister of War and Navy	Beltrán Mathieu	18 September 1901	18 November 1901	Radical
Minister of Finance	Juan Luis Sanfuentes	18 September 1901	3 October 1901	Liberal Democratic
Minister of Finance	Luis Barros Borgoño	3 October 1901	18 November 1901	Liberal
Minister of Industry and Public Works	Ismael Tocornal	18 September 1901	18 November 1901	Liberal
Tocornal-Yáñez Ministry
Minister of the Interior	Ismael Tocornal	18 November 1901	6 May 1902	Liberal
Minister of Foreign Affairs	Eliodoro Yáñez	18 November 1901	6 May 1902	Liberal
Minister of Justice and Public Instruction	José Rafael Balmaceda	18 November 1901	6 May 1902	Liberal Democratic
Minister of War and Navy	Beltrán Mathieu	18 November 1901	6 May 1902	Radical
Minister of Finance	Enrique Villegas Encalada	18 November 1901	6 May 1902	Liberal Democratic
Minister of Industry and Public Works	Rafael Orrego	18 November 1901	6 May 1902	Liberal
Barros-Vergara Ministry
Minister of the Interior	Ramón Barros Luco	6 May 1902	20 November 1902	Liberal
Minister of Foreign Affairs	José Francisco Vergara Donoso	6 May 1902	20 November 1902	Liberal
Minister of Justice and Public Instruction	José Rafael Balmaceda	6 May 1902	20 November 1902	Liberal Democratic
Minister of War and Navy	Víctor Manuel Lamas Benavente	6 May 1902	24 October 1902	Radical
Minister of Finance	Guillermo Barros Jara	6 May 1902	20 November 1902	Liberal
Minister of Industry and Public Works	Joaquín Villarino	6 May 1902	20 November 1902	Liberal Democratic
Fernández-Pinto Ministry
Minister of the Interior	Elías Fernández Albano	20 November 1902	4 April 1903	National
Minister of Foreign Affairs	Horacio Pinto Agüero	20 November 1902	7 April 1903	Liberal Democratic
Minister of Justice and Public Instruction	José Domingo Amunátegui Rivera	20 November 1902	7 April 1903	National
Minister of War and Navy	Francisco Baeza Sotomayor	20 November 1902	7 April 1903	National
Minister of Finance	Ricardo Cruzat Hurtado	20 November 1902	7 April 1903	Liberal Democratic
Minister of Industry and Public Works	Agustin Gana Urzúa	20 November 1902	7 April 1903	Liberal Democratic
Barros-Sotomayor Ministry
Minister of the Interior	Ramón Barros Luco	4 April 1903	6 June 1903	Liberal
Minister of Foreign Affairs	Rafael Sotomayor Gaete	7 April 1903	6 June 1903	National
Minister of Justice and Public Instruction	Aníbal Sanfuentes Velasco	7 April 1903	6 June 1903	Liberal Democratic
Minister of War and Navy	Ricardo Matte	7 April 1903	6 June 1903	Conservative
Minister of Finance	Manuel Salinas González	7 April 1903	6 June 1903	Liberal Democratic
Minister of Industry and Public Works	Francisco Rivas Vicuña	7 April 1903	6 June 1903	Conservative
Sotomayor-Del Campo Ministry
Minister of the Interior	Rafael Sotomayor Gaete	6 June 1903	1 September 1903	National
Minister of Foreign Affairs	Máximo del Campo Yávar	6 June 1903	1 September 1903	National
Minister of Justice and Public Instruction	Aníbal Sanfuentes Velasco	6 June 1903	1 September 1903	Liberal Democratic
Minister of War and Navy	Ricardo Matte	6 June 1903	1 September 1903	Conservative
Minister of Finance	Manuel Salinas González	6 June 1903	1 September 1903	Liberal Democratic
Minister of Industry and Public Works	Francisco Rivas Vicuña	6 June 1903	1 September 1903	Conservative
Matte-Edwards Ministry
Minister of the Interior	Ricardo Matte	1 September 1903	23 November 1903	Conservative
Minister of Foreign Affairs	Agustín Edwards Mac-Clure	1 September 1903	23 November 1903	National
Minister of Justice and Public Instruction	Francisco Javier Concha Berguecio	1 September 1903	23 November 1903	Liberal Democratic
Minister of War and Navy	Carlos Besa Navarro	1 September 1903	23 November 1903	National
Minister of Finance	Miguel Cruchaga Tocornal	1 September 1903	23 November 1903	Conservative
Minister of Industry and Public Works	Maximiliano Espinosa Pica	1 September 1903	23 November 1903	Liberal Democratic
Besa-Edwards Ministry
Minister of the Interior	Carlos Besa Navarro	23 November 1903	10 January 1904	National
Minister of Foreign Affairs	Agustín Edwards Mac-Clure	23 November 1903	10 January 1904	National
Minister of Justice and Public Instruction	Francisco Javier Concha Berguecio	23 November 1903	10 January 1904	Liberal Democratic
Minister of War and Navy	Luis Barros Méndez	23 November 1903	10 January 1904	Conservative
Minister of Finance	Miguel Cruchaga Tocornal	23 November 1903	10 January 1904	Conservative
Minister of Industry and Public Works	Maximiliano Espinosa Pica	23 November 1903	10 January 1904	Liberal Democratic
Errázuriz-Silva Ministry
Minister of the Interior	Rafael Errázuriz Urmeneta	10 January 1904	12 April 1904	Conservative
Minister of Foreign Affairs	Raimundo Silva Cruz	10 January 1904	12 April 1904	Liberal Democratic
Minister of Justice and Public Instruction	Efraín Vásquez Guarda	10 January 1904	12 April 1904	Liberal Democratic
Minister of War and Navy	Aníbal Cruz Díaz	10 January 1904	12 April 1904	National
Minister of Finance	Ramón Santelices Cuevas	10 January 1904	12 April 1904	Conservative
Minister of Industry and Public Works	Manuel Espinosa Jara	10 January 1904	12 April 1904	National

== Death ==
He died in Santiago, at the age of 62, on December 8, 1916, of a heart ailment.

== See also ==
- Riesco Island

Political offices
Preceded by Aníbal Zañartu Zañartu	President of Chile; 1901-1906	Succeeded by Pedro Montt Montt
