= Fernando Lazcano =

Chilean footballer (born 1988)

Personal information
- Full name: Fernando Tómas Lazcano Barros
- Date of birth: 7 April 1988 (age 38)
- Place of birth: La Calera, Chile
- Height: 1.77 m (5 ft 10 in)
- Position: Midfielder

Youth career
- 2003–2006: Huachipato

Senior career*
Years	Team	Apps	(Gls)
2007–2011	Huachipato	21	(1)
2009–2010	→ Deportes Concepción (loan)	64	(3)
2012	Unión La Calera	10	(0)
2013	Naval	6	(0)
2013–2014	Curicó Unido	21	(1)
2015–2016	Deportes Iquique	31	(0)
2016–2017	Deportes Temuco	11	(0)
2017–2018	Trofense	17	(0)
2018	Lusitanos	1	(1)
2019	Ñublense	21	(0)
2020	Curicó Unido	3	(0)
2021	Cobreloa	8	(0)
Total		214	(6)

Managerial career
- 2023–2024: Fernández Vial (sporting director)
- 2024–: Deportes Concepción (technical director)
- * Club domestic league appearances and goals

Fernando Tómas Lazcano Barros (born 10 November 1988) is a Chilean former professional footballer who played as a midfielder.

== Career ==
In his country of birth, Lazcano played for clubs such as Huachipato, Deportes Concepción, Deportes Iquique, Ñublense, among others.

He retired at the end of the 2021 season and his last club was Cobreloa in the Primera B de Chile.

== Post-retirement ==
Following his retirement, he joined amateur club Colo-Colito from Concepción, Chile in May 2022.

In his last years as a footballer, Lazcano got a degree in sport management. In 2023, he assumed as sport manager of Fernández Vial.
