= Emiliano Figueroa =

President of Chile (1925 to 1927)

Emiliano Figueroa Larraín
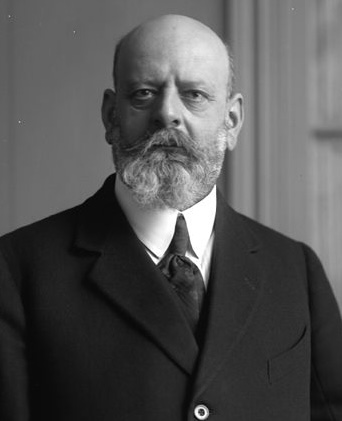
- Emiliano Figueroa, c. 1925

19th President of Chile
- In office December 23, 1925 – May 10, 1927
- Preceded by: Luis Barros Borgoño
- Succeeded by: Carlos Ibáñez del Campo

Vice President of Chile
- In office September 6, 1910 – December 23, 1910
- Preceded by: Elías Fernández Albano
- Succeeded by: Ramón Barros Luco

Personal details
- Born: 12 July 1866 Santiago, Chile
- Died: 16 May 1931 (aged 64) Santiago, Chile
- Party: Liberal Democratic
- Spouse: Leonor Sánchez Vicuña

Emiliano Figueroa Larraín (Latin American Spanish: [emiˈljano fiɣeˈɾo.a]; 12 July 1866 – 16 May 1931) was President of Chile from December 23, 1925, until his resignation on May 10, 1927. He also served as acting president for a few months in 1910.

== Biography ==
Figueroa was born on July 12, 1866, in Santiago, son of Francisco de Paula Figueroa Araoz and of Rosalía Larraín Echeverría. He studied in the San Ignacio School and then went on to study law at the State University. He graduated in 1889 and that same year was named secretary to the Intendant of Santiago.

Figueroa decided to embark on a political career and joined the Liberal Democratic Party, which supported a stronger executive. He was elected deputy for Victoria and Melipilla in 1900 and reelected in 1903. In 1907, once his term had ended, he was selected to replace Juan José Valenzuela, deputy for Rere and Puchacay, who had died in July that year. In 1909, Figueroa was once again elected to the Chamber of Deputies, this time representing Itata.

On October 25, 1907, President Pedro Montt named Figueroa Minister of Justice, a position which he kept until September 15, 1909. President Montt died on August 16, 1910, and was replaced by his Minister of Interior, Elías Fernández Albano, who became acting president. Fernández named Figueroa Minister of Interior but died on September 6 that very year. Figueroa then replaced Fernández as acting president and stayed in that position until December 23, when Ramón Barros Luco was inaugurated as president.

Barros named Figueroa to the post of ambassador to Spain in 1911, and in 1914 became ambassador to Argentina. Figueroa was considered a harmless politician and the three major political parties in Chile, Conservative, Liberal, and Radical, chose him as a consensus candidate for the 1925 Chilean presidential election. The purpose of having a single candidate was to avoid political campaigning in the volatile political situation the country was in. Nevertheless, leftist José Santos Salas ignored the three parties' agreement and declared his candidacy, backed by the Social Republican Worker's Union.

Figueroa easily defeated Salas and became president on 23 December 1925. Figueroa kept the ambitious General Carlos Ibáñez as Minister of War, and later named him Minister of the Interior. In 1927, Ibáñez ordered the arrest of Figueroa's brother Javier Ángel, President of the Supreme Court. Unable to withstand the political pressure, Figueroa resigned and Ibáñez became acting president. After winning the presidential election that year with 98% of the vote, Ibáñez became president and wielded dictatorial powers.

Ibáñez named Figueroa ambassador to Peru in 1928. Upon his return in 1929, Figueroa became president of the Central Bank of Chile. He died in a car accident on May 16, 1931.

Political offices
Preceded by Elías Fernández Albano	Acting President of Chile; 1910	Succeeded by Ramón Barros Luco
Preceded by Luis Barros Borgoño	President of Chile; 1925–1927	Succeeded by Carlos Ibáñez del Campo
Government offices
Preceded by Ismael Tocornal	Governor of Central Bank; 1929–1931	Succeeded by Francisco Garcés
