= Liberal Alliance (Chile) =

Historical political party in Chile

After the 1891 Chilean Civil War and the dissolution of the coalition between conservatives, radicals and anti-balmacedist liberals the Radical Party, the Democrat Party and several liberal organizations formed the Liberal Alliance (Spanish: Alianza Liberal). It was the main opposer of the Coalition. Along with the Coalition, it was one of the two parties of the bipartisan system of that period, the era of the Chilean parliamentary republic. The Alliance would later be called the Liberal Union, during a period in which it was a union of the radicals, the democrats, and all liberal groups (liberals, liberal democrats, nationals and the doctrinary liberals). It dissolved in 1925.

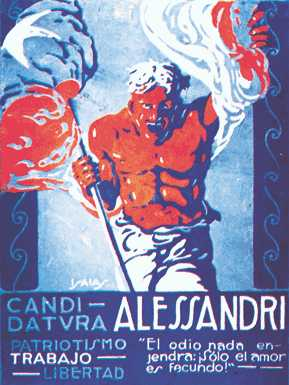
Poster supporting Liberal Alliance candidate Arturo Alessandri in the 1920 Chilean presidential election

== Presidential candidacies supported by the Liberal Alliance ==
- 1891 - Jorge Montt Álvarez (elected as president thanks to an agreement between all the political parties of his candidacy)
- 1896 – Vicente Reyes Palazuelos (not elected)
- 1901 – Germán Riesco Errázuriz (elected as president)
- 1906 – Pedro Montt Montt (elected as president)
- 1910 – Ramón Barros Luco (elected as president thanks to an agreement between all the political parties of his candidacy)
- 1915 – Javier Ángel Figueroa Larraín (not elected)
- 1920 – Arturo Alessandri Palma (elected as president)

== Electoral Results (1891-1924) ==
=== Members of the parliament ===
Year of election of parliament members	1891	1894	1897	1900	1903	1906	1909	1912	1915	1918	1921	1924
Liberal Alliance	54	66	26	42	38	53	52	62	53	67	68	75
Coalition	40	28	68	52	56	41	43	56	65	51	48	43
Max number of parliament seats	94	94	94	94	94	94	95	118	118	118	116	118

=== Senators ===
Year of election of senators	1891	1894	1897	1900	1903	1906	1909	1912	1915	1918	1921	1924
Liberal Alliance	23	22	14	16	9	7	17	18	21	24	24	23
Coalition	9	10	18	16	23	22	15	19	16	13	13	14
Max number of senators	32	32	32	32	32	29	32	37	37	37	37	37

== See also ==
- Liberal Party (Chile, 1849–1966)
- Liberalism and radicalism in Chile

== Sources ==
The original version of this article draws heavily on the corresponding article in the Spanish-language Wikipedia, which was accessed in the version of 8 June 2007.
