= Pedro Montt =

14th President of Chile

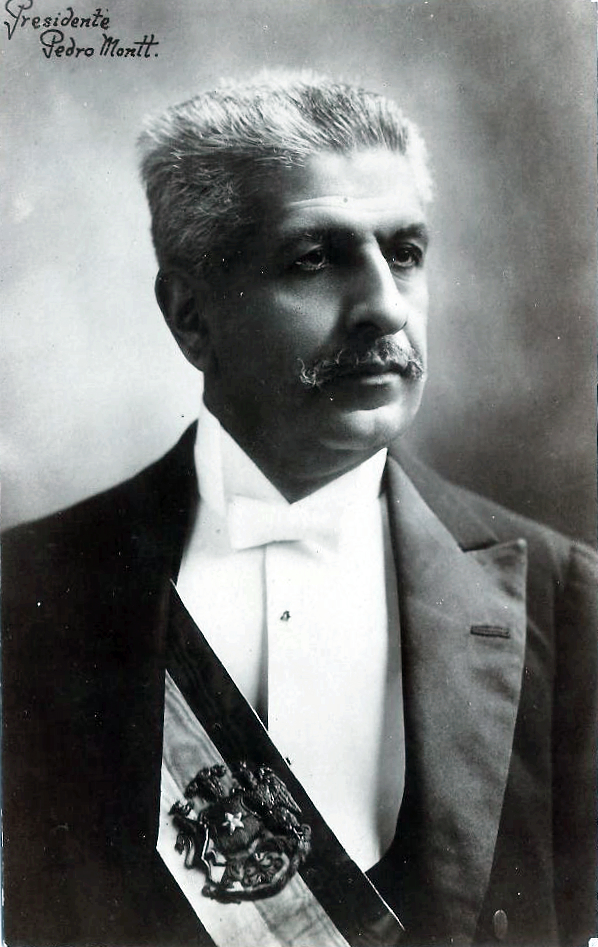
- Montt, c. 1902

15th President of Chile
- In office September 18, 1906 – August 16, 1910
- Preceded by: Germán Riesco Errázuriz
- Succeeded by: Elías Fernández Albano (Ramón Barros Luco as the 16th President)

Personal details
- Born: June 29, 1849 Santiago, Chile
- Died: August 16, 1910 (aged 61) Bremen, Germany
- Party: National
- Spouse: Sara del Campo Yávar

Pedro Elías Pablo Montt Montt (Latin American Spanish: [ˈpeðɾo ˈmond]; 29 June 1849, Santiago, Chile – 16 August 1910, Bremen, Germany) was a Chilean political figure. He served as the president of Chile from 1906 to his death from a probable stroke in 1910. His government furthered railroad and manufacturing activities but is said to have ignored pressing social and labour problems. Montt did, however, preside over the establishment in April 1907 of a labor office which was created for the purpose principally (as one authority has noted) “of investigating social problems, compiling labor statistics, and enforcing social legislation.” In addition, in 1908, an eight-hour day was introduced for those employed on public works.

== Biography ==
The son of the former Chilean president Manuel Montt Torres and Rosario Montt Goyenechea, Pedro Montt graduated in law from the National Institute in 1870. He was elected a member of the Chamber of Deputies in 1876 and became its president in 1885. Montt held two posts in the cabinet of President José Manuel Balmaceda, but in 1891 he took an active part in the revolution that overthrew Balmaceda. He then went to the United States, first as an agent of the revolutionary junta and later (after U.S. recognition) as Minister.

Unsuccessful in his first bid for the presidency in 1901, Montt was elected by a large majority in 1906 as the candidate of the National Union ticket. His first action was to call out the army to suppress large-scale strikes in 1907, which resulted in the Santa María School massacre. His administration supported the construction of a railway that ran the length of the country and stimulated the production of nitrates and copper. It did little, however, to improve the living conditions of the people. In 1909, then-child-prodigy pianist Claudio Arrau played for Montt, who was so taken by the performance that he authorized a ten-year grant from the Chilean government for Arrau to study in Europe. In 1910, Montt left Chile for medical treatment in Germany, but died before he could return to Chile.

== See also ==
- Montt family

Political offices
| Preceded by Position created | Minister of Industry and Public Works; 1887–1888 | Succeeded by Vicente Dávila |
| Preceded by Juan de Dios Vial | Minister of Finance; 1889–1890 | Succeeded by Pedro Nolasco Gandarillas |
| Preceded by Ramón Barros Luco | Minister of the Interior; 1893–1894 | Succeeded by Enrique Mac-Iver |
| Preceded by Germán Riesco Errázuriz | President of Chile; 1906–1910 | Succeeded by Elías Fernández Albano |
