= Democrat Party (Chile) =

Democrat Party Partido Demócrata
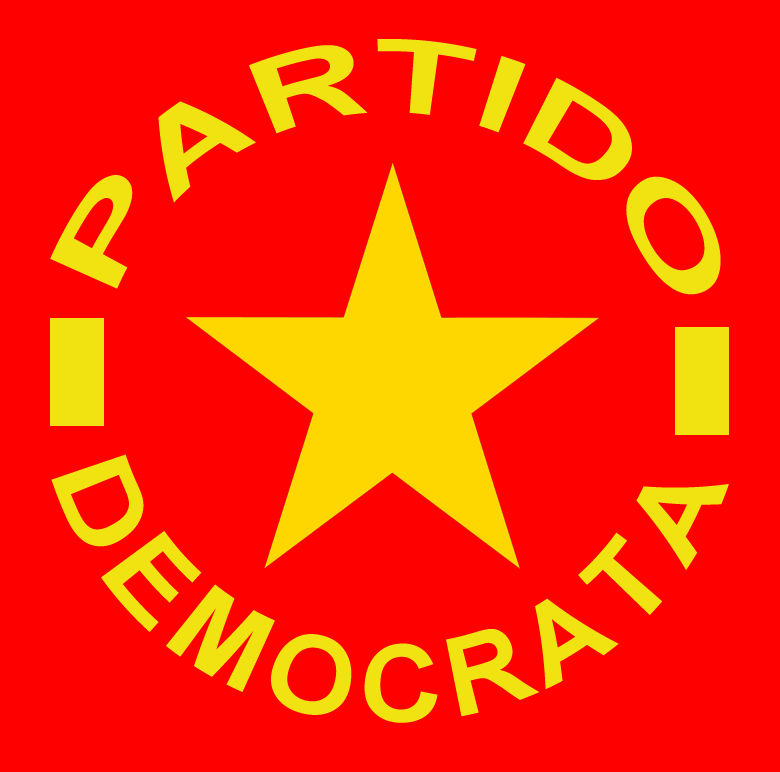
- Founded: 1887
- Dissolved: 1941
- Split from: Radical Party
- Merged into: Democratic Party
- Headquarters: Santiago de Chile
- Ideology: Social democracy Social liberalism Centrism
- Political position: Centre-left to Centre-right

The Democrat Party (Partido Demócrata) of Chile was a Chilean political party created by a left-wing faction of the Radical Party in 1887. It was created to protect the working and middle class, but over the years it became a traditional political movement, with factions of centre-right and centre-left.

Luis Emilio Recabarren was active in the party until 1912, when he founded the Socialist Workers Party (POS), which later changed its name to the Communist Party.

== Presidential candidates ==
The following is a list of the presidential candidates supported by the Democrat Party.

- 1896: Vicente Reyes (lost)
- 1901: Germán Riesco Errázuriz (won)
- 1906: Zenón Torrealba Ilabaca (lost)
- 1910: Ramón Barros Luco (won)
- 1915: Javier Ángel Figueroa (lost)
- 1920: Arturo Alessandri (won)
- 1925: Emiliano Figueroa (won)
- 1927: none
- 1931: Arturo Alessandri (lost)
- 1932: Arturo Alessandri (won)
- 1938: Gustavo Ross (lost)
