= Liberal Democratic Party (Chile, 1893) =

Liberal Democratic Party Partido Liberal Democrático
- Founded: 5 November 1893
- Dissolved: 1933
- Split from: Liberal Party
- Merged into: Liberal Party
- Headquarters: Santiago
- Ideology: Balmacedism; Liberalism
- Political position: Centre

The Liberal Democratic Party (Spanish: Partido Liberal Democrático, PLD), also called Balmacedists, was a liberal party in Chile. It was one of the main actors of the Chilean parliamentary system from 1891 to 1925.

== Liberal Democratic Party or balmacedist 1893–1933 ==
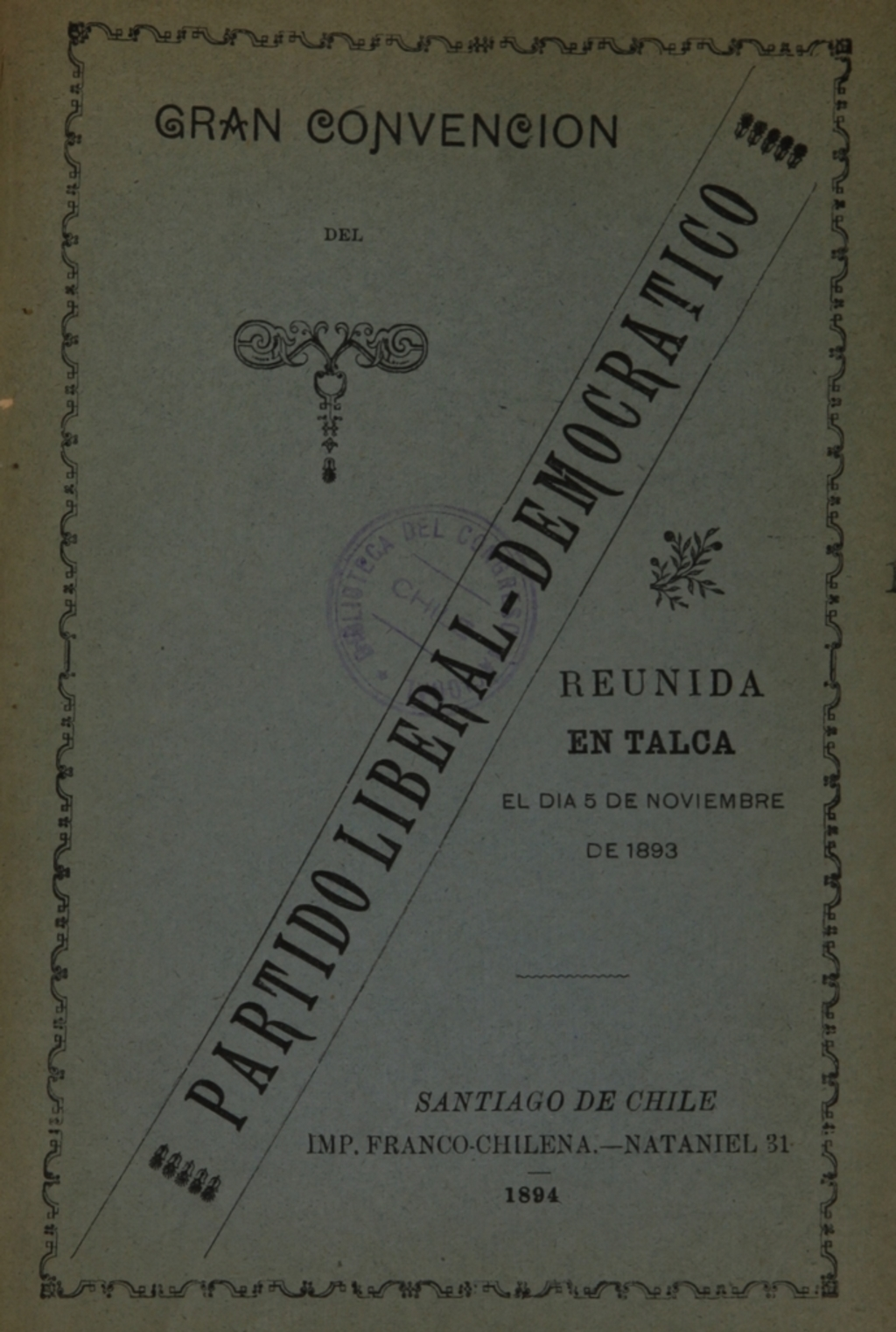
Party constitution published in 1894

The Liberal Democratic Party or balmacedist was formed on 5 November 1893 during a convention in Talca. It assembled former supporters of president José Manuel Balmaceda. Its party platform was a return to a strong presidency like those previous to the 1891 Chilean Civil War.

The LDP would split into the LDP-Aliancist, supporters of Arturo Alessandri and the LDP-Unionist, the opposers to Alessandri. It lasted until 1930, when it merged into the United Liberal Party. After the downfall of president Carlos Ibáñez in 1931 it rearranged as an independent party before finally merging into the Liberal Party in 1933.

=== Results in parliamentary elections ===
Year of elections (parliament seats)	Number of members of the parliament	Votes members of the parliament
1894 (94)	22	n/d
1897 (94)	22	n/d
1900 (94)	22	n/d
1903 (94)	27	n/d
1906 (94)	20	n/d
1909 (94)	15	n/d
1912 (118)	27	n/d
1915 (118)	21	n/d
1918 (118)	15	n/d
1921 (118)	8	n/d
1924 (118)	9	n/d
1932 (142)	1	1.086 (0.5%)

== Presidential candidates ==
The following is a list of the presidential candidates supported by the Liberal Democratic Party (balmacedist). (Information gathered from the Archive of Chilean Elections).

- 1896: Vicente Reyes (lost)
- 1901: Germán Riesco (won)
- 1906: Fernando Lazcano (lost)
- 1910: Ramón Barros Luco (won)
- 1915: Juan Luis Sanfuentes (won)
- 1920: Arturo Alessandri (won), Luis Barros Borgoño (lost)
- 1925: Emiliano Figueroa (won)
- 1927: none
- 1931: Arturo Alessandri (lost)
- 1932: Enrique Zañartu Prieto (lost)

== See also ==
- Category:Liberal Democratic Party (Chile, 1893) politicians
- Liberal Party (Chile, 1849–1966)
- Liberal Democratic Party (Chile, 1875-1886)
- Liberalism and radicalism in Chile
