= Juan Luis Sanfuentes =

President of Chile from 1915 to 1920

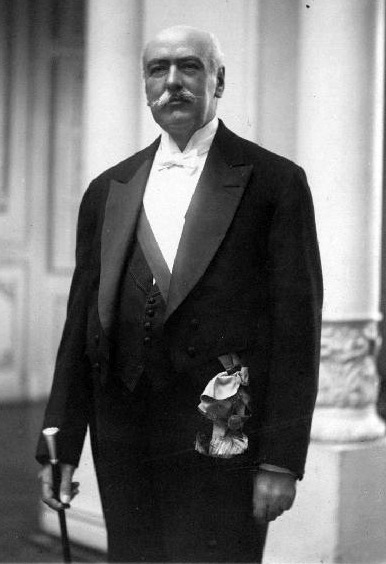

17th President of Chile
- In office 23 December 1915 – 23 December 1920
- Preceded by: Ramón Barros Luco
- Succeeded by: Arturo Alessandri

Member of the Senate
- In office 1912 – 23 December 1915
- Succeeded by: Alfredo Escobar
- Constituency: Concepción
- In office 15 May 1900 – 15 May 1906
- In office 1906–1912

President of the Senate
- In office 5 June 1906 – 14 October 1907
- Preceded by: Fernando Lazcano Echaurren
- Succeeded by: Ramón Escobar

Personal details
- Born: December 27, 1858 Santiago, Chile
- Died: July 16, 1930 (aged 71) Santiago, Chile
- Party: Liberal Democratic
- Spouse: Ana Echazarreta

Juan Luis Sanfuentes Andonaegui (Latin American Spanish: [xwan lwis saɱˈfwentes]; 27 December 1858 – 16 July 1930) was President of Chile between 1915 and 1920.

== Early life ==
Sanfuentes was the son of writer and politician Salvador Sanfuentes Torres and Matilde Andonaegui. Orphaned at an early age and raised by his older brother, Enrique Salvador Sanfuentes, he trained as a lawyer at the University of Chile. He graduated with a Doctor of Law in 1879. He married Ana Echazarreta (ca. 1865–1927) in 1885, and the couple had five children.

== Career ==
Rising to the position of Minister of Finance under Federico Errázuriz Echaurren in 1901, Sanfuentes served as President of the Senate of Chile from 1906 through 1909.

The Chilean presidential election of 1915 developed into a bitter contest between Sanfuentes —a coalition candidate of the Liberal Democratic Party and the Conservative Party— and Javier Ángel Figueroa —supported by the Liberal Alliance parties. Sanfuentes beat Figueroa by a single vote, among allegations of fraud and electoral intervention. The National Congress was called to confirm the result.

== Presidency ==
Through World War I Chile remained neutral, despite pressure from the United States after 1917. While the conflict lasted, domestic industry had one of its biggest booms, with the national industry growing 53% in those four years. But the end of the war led to a crisis of the nitrate industry, which resulted in a wave of social unrest.

In 1916, a law was introduced that safeguarded blue-collars against accidents, and an Act of November 1917 introduced mandatory Sunday rest for employees and workers in commercial and industrial establishments. However, Sanfuentes' hard line against striking coal miners and trade unionists in the final year of his presidency was a key factor in the rise of his liberal reformer successor.

After office, Sanfuentes retired from public life, devoting himself to family life with his wife in his estate, Camarico, near Talca.

== Honours and awards ==
=== Foreign Honours ===
Portugal:

- Grand Cross of the Order of the Tower and Sword (22 April 1921)

Spain:

- Grand Cross of the Order of Charles III (19 June 1922)

Political offices
Preceded by Ramón Barros Luco	President of Chile; 1915–1920	Succeeded by Arturo Alessandri
