= Ramón Barros Luco =

Chilean politician and President (1835–1919)

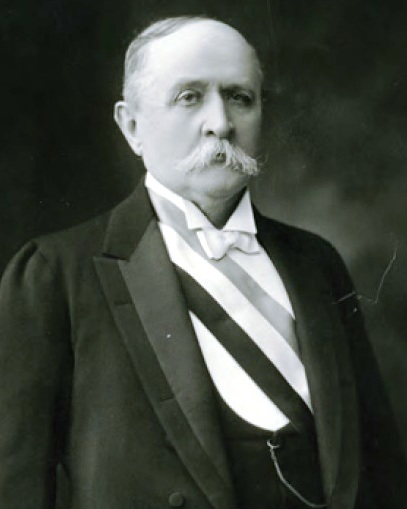

16th President of Chile
- In office December 23, 1910 – December 23, 1915
- Preceded by: Emiliano Figueroa (Pedro Montt as the 15th)
- Succeeded by: Juan Luis Sanfuentes

Personal details
- Born: June 9, 1835 Santiago, Chile
- Died: September 20, 1919 (aged 84) Santiago, Chile
- Party: Liberal
- Spouse: Mercedes Valdés Cuevas

Ramón Barros Luco (Latin American Spanish: [raˈmom ˈbaros ˈluko]; June 9, 1835 – September 20, 1919) was President of Chile between 1910 and 1915.

Barros Luco was born in 1835 in Santiago, Barros Luco was son of Ramón Luis Barros Fernández and Dolores Luco Fernández de Leiva. He graduated from Law School in 1858. He died in Santiago in 1919.

He was elected representative for the city of Casablanca in 1861, and from then on occupied a seat in the Lower House, being elected representative for Caldera (1867–70), Curicó (1870–73), Valparaíso (1873–76, and 1888–91), as well as for Santiago, during four separate terms, between 1876 and 1894. Later, he was elected senator for Linares (1900–06).

In his position as President of the House of Deputies in 1891, he endorsed the move to dismiss the then President of the Republic, José Manuel Balmaceda, a move drawn up by the Congress. In addition, he lent his support to the uprising of the National Army, whose movements he oversaw, (alongside Waldo Silva, vice-president of the Senate), until they took their place in the government in Iquique. The revolution having succeeded, he resumed his functions as a parliamentarian, performing as a minister on several occasions, whenever the situation called for, "someone who posed no threat to anybody".

In 1910, given the existing tensions between liberals and nationals in the debate over a common candidate, he was chosen as the representative for both parties. His career to date assured both parties that, if he were to be elected, their interests would remain unharmed.

== Government ==
The philosophy of Barros Luco's government can be summarised with the following phrase, well known in Chile, "99% of problems solve themselves, and the remaining 1% have no solution" ("El 99% de los problemas se resuelven solos y el 1% restante no tiene solución"). He applied this maxim to his administration, which would be consumed by the machinations of the parliament at large, the propensity of which was to delay or hinder the government under any pretense, including the most trivial claim of a minor deputy. However, Barros Luco cannot be accused of mere acceptance and reluctance to act, as he possessed a plan to counter the aforementioned political strategy of accusations and delays, and subsequent frequent change of ministers, known as the "rotativa". His policy was as follows: anytime a deputy placed an accusation against a minister leading to said minister's downfall, the accusing deputy would be called upon to head the new cabinet.

His hopes were dashed however, as this "rotary" system arrived at a total of 15 ministers, the first of whom lasted only 18 days in office, and the last of whom failed even to appear before Congress, the previous minister having resigned only days before the handover of government.

Some deputies, led by the liberal Manuel Rivas Vicuña, tried to correct the parliamentary vices, with the support of Pres. Barros Luco. In 1912 he approved a modification to the system of parliamentary debate (in particular the system to finish debates), however if a large enough group opposed a motion or accused a minister, parliament could still be severely delayed.

Meanwhile, the corruption amongst the political parties had reached alarming levels, in answer to which laws against fraud were approved in 1914 and 1915, in addition to a reform of the municipal system, which managed to eliminate the falsification of results, allowing for greater transparency. However this reform brought with it an unexpected negative side effect: an increase in electoral bribery.

Barros Luco also focused his efforts on public works; during his term of office he initiated the construction of the port of San Antonio, in addition to the construction of roads, bridges, drinking water and sewers.

Also, the national School of Engineering, Museum of History, National Archives, School of Aviation and the Arica-La Paz railway were built during his tenure as president. However, the large majority of works during his time represented the completion of projects begun by Pedro Montt Montt, fulfilling a promise of Montt's, "like the tale of a child with an egg. Another started the work, and no one will know in the end to whom the credit is due. They will end up by paying graditude to the one who has had the least to do with the project" (Pres. Montt was reputed to have complained thus as he laid the cornerstone of the National Library of Chile).

== Foreign policy ==
On the international scene, on 25 May 1915, he signed the ABC Pact. This pact, signed between the so-called "ABC Powers" (Argentina, Brazil and Chile), was a means to combat the influence of the United States in the region, as well as to establish an equilibrium and channels of communication between the three signatories. The official name of the pact was the Non-Aggression, Consultation and Arbitration pact.

During his government the First World War broke out, with Chile adopting a neutral position. While this position would bring initial economic benefits, in the long term the consequences were dire; although the price of salitre (sodium nitrate) had risen due to European demand, the limitation of salitre exports to Germany would mean that, apart from losing a valuable market, Chile would also lose their natural monopoly as a result of the development of synthetic salitre. This would spell the beginning of the end of the salitre industry in Chile.

== Namesake sandwich ==
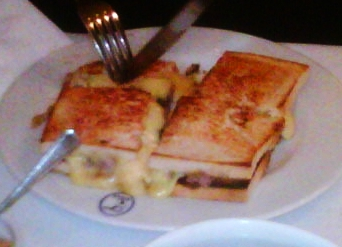
Barros Luco sandwich

Barros Luco used to eat a particular sandwich often, which became known as a Barros Luco. The sandwich is made with a slab of steak or multiple slices of beef with melted cheese, prepared on the grill and served hot. It is available today in most restaurants throughout Chile.

Political offices
Preceded by Emiliano Figueroa Larraín	President of Chile; 1910-1915	Succeeded by Juan Luis Sanfuentes
Government offices
Preceded by Camilo Cobo	Minister of Finance; 1872-1876	Succeeded by Rafael Sotomayor
Preceded by Pedro Lucio Cuadra	Minister of Finance; 1884-1885	Succeeded by Pedro Nolasco Gandarillas Luco
Preceded by José Manuel Balmaceda	Minister of the Interior; 1885	Succeeded by José Ignacio Vergara
Preceded by Pedro Lucio Cuadra Luque	Minister of the Interior; 1888-1889	Succeeded by Demetrio Lastarria
Preceded by Jorge Riesco	Minister of Industry and Public Works; 1889	Succeeded by José Miguel Valdés
Preceded by Manuel José Yrarrázabal	Minister of the Interior; 1891-1892	Succeeded by Eduardo Matte Pérez
Preceded by Eduardo Matte Pérez	Minister of the Interior; 1892-1893	Succeeded by Pedro Montt Montt
Preceded by Enrique Mac-Iver	Minister of the Interior; 1894-1895	Succeeded by Manuel Recabarren Recoret
Preceded by Aníbal Zañartu	Minister of the Interior; 1901	Succeeded by Ismael Tocornal
Preceded by Ismael Tocornal	Minister of the Interior; 1902	Succeeded by Elías Fernández Albano
Preceded by Elías Fernández Albano	Minister of the Interior; 1903	Succeeded by Rafael Sotomayor Gaete
