= List of presidents of Chile =

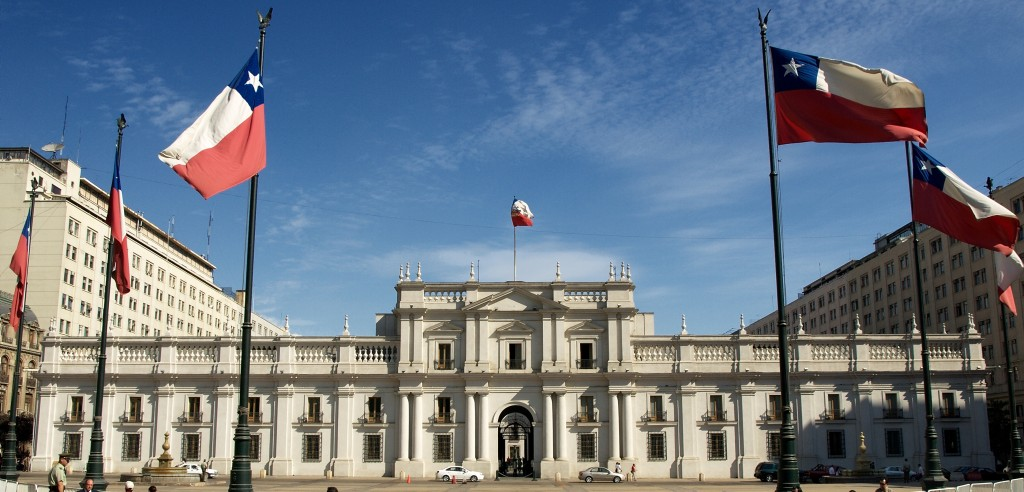
The La Moneda Palace, the president's official residence and centre of the administration.

This article contains a list of presidents of Chile from the establishment of the first government junta in 1810, at the beginning of the Chilean War of Independence, to the present day.

== Patria Vieja (1810–1814) ==
=== Government Juntas (1810–1814) ===
No.	Portrait	Name (Birth–Death)	Term of office		Notes	Ref.
—		Mateo de Toro y Zambrano (1727–1811)	18 September 1810	26 February 1811 †	President of the First Government Junta. Died in office.	
—		Juan Martínez de Rozas (1759–1813)	27 February 1811	2 April 1811	Interim President of the First Government Junta.	
—		Fernando Márquez de la Plata (1740–1818)	2 April 1811	4 July 1811	President of the First Government Junta.	
—		Juan Antonio Ovalle (1750–1819)	4 July 1811	20 July 1811	President of the First National Congress.	
—		Martín Calvo Encalada (1756–1828)	20 July 1811	11 August 1811	President of the First National Congress.	
—		Martín Calvo Encalada (1756–1828)	11 August 1811	4 September 1811	President of the Provisional Executive Authority.	
—		Juan Enrique Rosales (1755–1825)	4 September 1811	16 November 1811	President of the Executive Court.	
—		José Miguel Carrera (1785–1821)	16 November 1811	13 December 1811	President of the Provisional Government Junta.	
—		José Miguel Carrera (1785–1821)	13 December 1811	8 January 1812	Provisional Supreme Authority.	
—		José Miguel Carrera (1785–1821)	8 January 1812	8 April 1812	President of the Provisional Government Junta.	
—		José Santiago Portales y Larraín (1764–1835)	8 April 1812	6 August 1812	President of the Provisional Government Junta.	
—		Pedro José Prado Jaraquemada (1754–1827)	6 August 1812	6 December 1812	President of the Provisional Government Junta.	
—		José Miguel Carrera (1785–1821)	6 December 1812	30 March 1813	President of the Provisional Government Junta.	
—		Juan José Carrera (1782–1818)	30 March 1813	13 April 1813	President of the Provisional Government Junta.	
—		Francisco Antonio Pérez (1764–1828)	13 April 1813	23 August 1813	President of the Superior Governmental Junta.	
—		José Miguel Infante (1778–1844)	23 August 1813	11 January 1814	President of the Superior Governmental Junta.	
—		Agustín Eyzaguirre (1768–1837)	11 January 1814	7 March 1814	President of the Superior Governmental Junta.	

=== Supreme directors (1814) ===
No.	Portrait	Name (Birth–Death)	Term of office		Notes
—		Antonio José de Irisarri (1786–1868)	7 March 1814	14 March 1814	Interim Supreme Director.
1		Francisco de la Lastra (1777–1852)	14 March 1814	23 July 1814	Supreme Director.
—		José Miguel Carrera (1785–1821)	23 July 1814	2 October 1814	President of the Government Junta. Chilean defeat in the Battle of Rancagua, Spain regains control of Chile.

== Reconquest (1814–1817) ==
No.	Portrait	Name (Birth–Death)	Term of office		Head of State
No.	Portrait	Name (Birth–Death)	Took office	Left office	Head of State
No.	Portrait	Name (Birth–Death)	Time in office		Head of State
RG		Mariano Osorio (1777–1819)	3 October 1814	26 December 1815	Ferdinand VII
RG		Mariano Osorio (1777–1819)	1 year, 84 days		Ferdinand VII
RG		Francisco Marcó del Pont (1770–1819)	26 December 1815	12 February 1817 (Deposed)	Ferdinand VII
RG		Francisco Marcó del Pont (1770–1819)	1 year, 48 days		Ferdinand VII

== Patria Nueva (1817–1826) ==
No.	Portrait	Name (Birth–Death)	Term of office		Party
No.	Portrait	Name (Birth–Death)	Took office	Left office	Party
No.	Portrait	Name (Birth–Death)	Time in office		Party
2nd SD		Bernardo O'Higgins (1778–1842)	16 February 1817	28 January 1823 (Resigned)	Independent
2nd SD		Bernardo O'Higgins (1778–1842)	5 years, 346 days		Independent
Junta		Agustín Eyzaguirre (1768–1837)	28 January 1823	4 April 1823	Independent
Junta		Agustín Eyzaguirre (1768–1837)	66 days		Independent
3rd SD		Ramón Freire (1787–1851)	4 April 1823	9 July 1826	Pipiolos
3rd SD		Ramón Freire (1787–1851)	3 years, 96 days		Pipiolos

== Presidents (1826–present) ==
=== Organization of the Republic (1826–1830) ===
No.	Portrait	Name (Birth–Death)	Term of office		Party	Elected	Vice President (Note: The position of "Vice President" was created along with the position of "President" in 1826. The Vice President served to replace the President in case of the latter's death or absence. The post was abolished with the Constitution of 1833 and since then the title of "Vice President" has been given to an ex officio member replacing the elected President.)
No.	Portrait	Name (Birth–Death)	Took office	Left office	Party	Elected	Vice President
No.	Portrait	Name (Birth–Death)	Time in office		Party	Elected	Vice President
1		Manuel Blanco Encalada (1790–1876)	9 July 1826	9 September 1826 (Resigned)	Independent	1826	Agustín Eyzaguirre
1		Manuel Blanco Encalada (1790–1876)	62 days		Independent	1826	Agustín Eyzaguirre
Acting		Agustín Eyzaguirre (1768–1837)	9 September 1826	25 January 1827 (Resigned)	Independent	Interim Vice-President under Manuel Blanco Encalada, assumed the presidency after his resignation.	Vacant
Acting		Agustín Eyzaguirre (1768–1837)	138 days		Independent	Interim Vice-President under Manuel Blanco Encalada, assumed the presidency after his resignation.	Vacant
Acting		Ramón Freire (1787–1851)	25 January 1827	8 May 1827 (Resigned)	Pipiolos	Provisional President.	Francisco Antonio Pinto
2		Ramón Freire (1787–1851)	103 days		Pipiolos	1827	Francisco Antonio Pinto
Acting		Francisco Antonio Pinto (1785–1858)	8 May 1827	2 November 1829 (Resigned)	Pipiolos	(Note: Interim Vice-President under Ramon Freire, assumed the presidency after his resignation)	Vacant
Acting		Francisco Antonio Pinto (1785–1858)	8 May 1827	2 November 1829 (Resigned)	Pipiolos	(Note: For health reasons, Francisco Antonio Pinto made the President of the Senate, Francisco Ramón Vicuña, Delegate President. Between 16 July 1829 and 19 October 1829)	Vacant
3 (Note: First President elected by the electoral college)		Francisco Antonio Pinto (1785–1858)	2 years, 178 days		Pipiolos	1829	Joaquín Vicuña
Acting		Francisco Ramón Vicuña (1775–1849)	2 November 1829	7 November 1829 (Deposed)	Pipiolos	President of the Senate. Deposed during the Chilean Civil War of 1829–1830.	Vacant
Acting		Francisco Ramón Vicuña (1775–1849)	5 days		Pipiolos	President of the Senate. Deposed during the Chilean Civil War of 1829–1830.	Vacant
Junta		Ramón Freire (1787–1851)	7 November 1829	8 November 1829 (Deposed)	Pipiolos	President of the Government Junta.	Vacant
Junta		Ramón Freire (1787–1851)	1 day		Pipiolos	President of the Government Junta.	Vacant
Acting		Francisco Ramón Vicuña (1775–1849)	8 November 1829	7 December 1829 (Resigned)	Pipiolos	President of the Senate. Restoration of its original mandate.	Vacant
Acting		Francisco Ramón Vicuña (1775–1849)	29 days		Pipiolos	President of the Senate. Restoration of its original mandate.	Vacant
Civil War. There was no president in this period. 7 December 1829 – 24 December 1829							Vacant
Junta		José Tomás Ovalle y Bezanilla (1787–1831)	24 December 1829	18 February 1830	Pelucones	President of the Government Junta.	Vacant
Junta		José Tomás Ovalle y Bezanilla (1787–1831)	56 days		Pelucones	President of the Government Junta.	Vacant
Acting		Francisco Ruiz-Tagle Portales (1790–1860)	18 February 1830	1 April 1830 (Resigned)	Pelucones	Provisional President.	José Tomás Ovalle y Bezanilla
Acting		Francisco Ruiz-Tagle Portales (1790–1860)	42 days		Pelucones	Provisional President.	José Tomás Ovalle y Bezanilla
Acting		José Tomás Ovalle y Bezanilla (1787–1831)	1 April 1830	8 March 1831 (Resigned)	Pelucones	Provisional Vice-President under Francisco Ruiz-Tagle, assumed the presidency after his resignation.	Vacant
Acting		José Tomás Ovalle y Bezanilla (1787–1831)	341 days		Pelucones	Provisional Vice-President under Francisco Ruiz-Tagle, assumed the presidency after his resignation.	Vacant
Acting		Fernando Errázuriz Aldunate (1777–1841)	8 March 1831	18 September 1831	Pelucones	Provisional President appointed by the Congress.	Vacant
Acting		Fernando Errázuriz Aldunate (1777–1841)	194 days		Pelucones	(Note: On 21 March 1831 the Congress appointed José Joaquín Prieto as president and Fernando Errázuriz as vice president, but Prieto did not take office and instead resigned immediately, making Fernando Errázuriz president automatically.)	Vacant

=== Conservative Republic (1830–1861) ===
No.	Portrait	Name (Birth–Death)	Term of office		Party	Elected	Vice President
No.	Portrait	Name (Birth–Death)	Took office	Left office	Party	Elected	Vice President
No.	Portrait	Name (Birth–Death)	Time in office		Party	Elected	Vice President
4		Joaquín Prieto (1786–1854)	18 September 1831	18 September 1841	Pelucones	1831	Diego Portales (Note: Did not take office and instead resigned immediately, but this was not accepted by the Congress. Continued to be de jure Vice-President until the abolition of the post with a new Constitution on 26 May 1833.)
4		Joaquín Prieto (1786–1854)	18 September 1831	18 September 1841	Pelucones	1831	Post abolished
4		Joaquín Prieto (1786–1854)	10 years		Conservative	1836	Post abolished
5		Manuel Bulnes (1799–1866)	18 September 1841	18 September 1851	Conservative	1841	Post abolished
5		Manuel Bulnes (1799–1866)	10 years		Conservative	1846	Post abolished
6		Manuel Montt (1809–1880)	18 September 1851	18 September 1861	Conservative	1851	Post abolished
6		Manuel Montt (1809–1880)	10 years		National	1856	Post abolished

=== Liberal Republic (1861–1891) ===
No.	Portrait	Name (Birth–Death)	Term of office		Party	Elected
No.	Portrait	Name (Birth–Death)	Took office	Left office	Party	Elected
No.	Portrait	Name (Birth–Death)	Time in office		Party	Elected
7		José Joaquín Pérez (1801–1889)	18 September 1861	18 September 1871	National	1861
7		José Joaquín Pérez (1801–1889)	10 years (Note: In 1871, a constitutional reform prohibited re-election for the following term)		National	1866
8		Federico Errázuriz Zañartu (1825–1877)	18 September 1871	18 September 1876	Liberal	1871
8		Federico Errázuriz Zañartu (1825–1877)	5 years		Liberal	1871
9		Aníbal Pinto (1825–1884)	18 September 1876	18 September 1881	Liberal	1876
9		Aníbal Pinto (1825–1884)	5 years		Liberal	1876
10		Domingo Santa María (1825–1889)	18 September 1881	18 September 1886	Liberal	1881
10		Domingo Santa María (1825–1889)	5 years		Liberal	1881
11		José Manuel Balmaceda (1840–1891)	18 September 1886	29 August 1891 (Resigned)	Liberal	1886
11		José Manuel Balmaceda (1840–1891)	4 years, 345 days		Liberal	1886
Acting / Manuel Baquedano (1823–1897) / 29 August 1891 / 31 August 1891 / Military / Head of Provisional Government.; Acting / Manuel Baquedano (1823–1897) / 2 days / / Military / Head of Provisional Government.

=== Parliamentary Republic (1891–1925) ===
No.	Portrait	Name (Birth–Death)	Term of office		Party	Elected
No.	Portrait	Name (Birth–Death)	Took office	Left office	Party	Elected
No.	Portrait	Name (Birth–Death)	Time in office		Party	Elected
Junta		Jorge Montt (1845–1922)	31 August 1891	18 September 1896	Military	President of the Government Junta.
Acting		Jorge Montt (1845–1922)	31 August 1891	18 September 1896	Military	(Note: Head of the Executive Power since 10 November 1891 until 26 December 1891)
12		Jorge Montt (1845–1922)	5 years, 18 days		Military	October 1891
13		Federico Errázuriz Echaurren (1850–1901)	18 September 1896	12 July 1901 (Died in office)	Liberal	1896
13		Federico Errázuriz Echaurren (1850–1901)	4 years, 297 days		Liberal	1896
Acting / Aníbal Zañartu (1847–1902) / 12 July 1901 / 18 September 1901 / Liberal / Minister of the Interior acting as vice president.; Acting / Aníbal Zañartu (1847–1902) / 68 days / / Liberal / Minister of the Interior acting as vice president.
14		Germán Riesco (1854–1916)	18 September 1901	18 September 1906	Liberal	1901
14		Germán Riesco (1854–1916)	5 years		Liberal	1901
15		Pedro Montt (1849–1910)	18 September 1906	16 August 1910 (Died in office)	National	1906
15		Pedro Montt (1849–1910)	3 years, 332 days		National	1906
Acting / Elías Fernández Albano (1845–1910) / 16 August 1910 / 6 September 1910 (Died in office) / National / Minister of the Interior acting as vice president.; Acting / Elías Fernández Albano (1845–1910) / 21 days / / National / Minister of the Interior acting as vice president.; Acting / Emiliano Figueroa (1866–1931) / 6 September 1910 / 23 December 1910 / Liberal Democratic / Minister of Justice acting as vice president.; Acting / Emiliano Figueroa (1866–1931) / 108 days / / Liberal Democratic / Minister of Justice acting as vice president.
16		Ramón Barros Luco (1835–1919)	23 December 1910	23 December 1915	Liberal	1910
16		Ramón Barros Luco (1835–1919)	5 years		Liberal	1910
17		Juan Luis Sanfuentes (1858–1930)	23 December 1915	23 December 1920	Liberal Democratic	1915
17		Juan Luis Sanfuentes (1858–1930)	5 years		Liberal Democratic	1915
18		Arturo Alessandri (1868–1950)	23 December 1920	11 September 1924 (Deposed)	Liberal	1920
18		Arturo Alessandri (1868–1950)	3 years, 263 days		Liberal	1920
Junta / Luis Altamirano (1876–1938) / 11 September 1924 / 23 January 1925 (Deposed) / Military / President of the Government Junta of 1924.; Junta / Luis Altamirano (1876–1938) / 134 days / / Military / President of the Government Junta of 1924.; Junta / Pedro Dartnell (1874–1944) / 23 January 1925 / 27 January 1925 (Resigned) / Military / President of the Government Junta of 1925.; Junta / Pedro Dartnell (1874–1944) / 4 days / / Military / President of the Government Junta of 1925.; Junta / Emilio Bello Codesido (1868–1963) / 27 January 1925 / 12 March 1925 / Liberal Democratic / President of the Government Junta of 1925.; Junta / Emilio Bello Codesido (1868–1963) / 44 days / / Liberal Democratic / President of the Government Junta of 1925.

=== Presidential Republic (1925–1973) ===
No.	Portrait	Name (Birth–Death)	Term of office		Party	Elected
No.	Portrait	Name (Birth–Death)	Took office	Left office	Party	Elected
No.	Portrait	Name (Birth–Death)	Time in office		Party	Elected
18 (Note: Restoration of his original mandate.)		Arturo Alessandri (1868–1950)	12 March 1925	1 October 1925	Liberal	1920
18		Arturo Alessandri (1868–1950)	203 days		Liberal	1920
Acting / Luis Barros Borgoño (1858–1943) / 1 October 1925 / 23 December 1925 / Liberal / Minister of the Interior acting as vice president.; Acting / Luis Barros Borgoño (1858–1943) / 83 days / / Liberal / Minister of the Interior acting as vice president.
19 (Note: First President elected under universal suffrage)		Emiliano Figueroa (1866–1931)	23 December 1925	10 May 1927 (Resigned)	Liberal Democratic	1925
19		Emiliano Figueroa (1866–1931)	1 year, 138 days		Liberal Democratic	1925
Acting		Carlos Ibáñez del Campo (1877–1960)	10 May 1927	26 July 1931 (Resigned)	Independent	Minister of the Interior acting as vice president.
20		Carlos Ibáñez del Campo (1877–1960)	4 years, 77 days		Independent	1927
Acting / Pedro Opaso (1876–1957) / 26 July 1931 / 27 July 1931 (Resigned) / Liberal Democratic / President of the Senate acting as vice president.; Acting / Pedro Opaso (1876–1957) / 1 day / / Liberal Democratic / President of the Senate acting as vice president.; Acting / Juan Esteban Montero (1879–1948) / 27 July 1931 / 20 August 1931 (Resigned) / Radical / Minister of the Interior acting as vice president.; Acting / Juan Esteban Montero (1879–1948) / 24 days / / Radical / Minister of the Interior acting as vice president.; Acting / Manuel Trucco (1875–1954) / 20 August 1931 / 15 November 1931 / Radical / Minister of the Interior acting as vice president.; Acting / Manuel Trucco (1875–1954) / 87 days / / Radical / Minister of the Interior acting as vice president.
Acting		Juan Esteban Montero (1879–1948)	15 November 1931	4 June 1932 (Deposed)	Radical	Minister of the Interior acting as vice president.
21		Juan Esteban Montero (1879–1948)	202 days		Radical	1931
Junta / Arturo Puga (1879–1970) / 4 June 1932 / 16 June 1932 (Resigned) / Military / President of the Government Junta.; Junta / Arturo Puga (1879–1970) / 12 days / / Military / President of the Government Junta.; Junta / Carlos Dávila (1887–1955) / 16 June 1932 / 8 July 1932 (Resigned) / Socialist / President of the Government Junta.; Acting / Carlos Dávila (1887–1955) / 22 days / / Socialist / Provisional President of the Socialist Republic of Chile since 8 July 1932.; Acting / Bartolomé Blanche (1879–1970) / 13 September 1932 / 2 October 1932 (Resigned) / Military / Provisional President.; Acting / Bartolomé Blanche (1879–1970) / 19 days / / Military / Provisional President.; Acting / Abraham Oyanedel (1874–1954) / 2 October 1932 / 24 December 1932 / Independent / President of the Supreme Court acting as vice president.; Acting / Abraham Oyanedel (1874–1954) / 83 days / / Independent / President of the Supreme Court acting as vice president.
22		Arturo Alessandri (1868–1950)	24 December 1932	24 December 1938	Liberal	1932
22		Arturo Alessandri (1868–1950)	6 years		Liberal	1932
23		Pedro Aguirre Cerda (1879–1941)	24 December 1938	25 November 1941 (Died in office)	Radical	1938 (Note: Supported by the center-left coalition Popular Front)
23		Pedro Aguirre Cerda (1879–1941)	2 years, 336 days		Radical	1938
Acting / Jerónimo Méndez (1887–1959) / 25 November 1941 / 2 April 1942 / Radical / Minister of the Interior acting as vice president.; Acting / Jerónimo Méndez (1887–1959) / 97 days / / Radical / Minister of the Interior acting as vice president.
24		Juan Antonio Ríos (1888–1946)	2 April 1942	27 June 1946 (Died in office)	Radical	1942
24		Juan Antonio Ríos (1888–1946)	4 years, 117 days		Radical	1942
Acting / Alfredo Duhalde (1898–1985) / 27 June 1946 / 3 August 1946 (Resigned) / Radical / Minister of the Interior acting as vice president.; Acting / Alfredo Duhalde (1898–1985) / 37 days / / Radical / Minister of the Interior acting as vice president.; Acting / Vicente Merino (1889–1977) / 3 August 1946 / 13 August 1946 (Resigned) / Military / Minister of the Interior acting as vice president.; Acting / Vicente Merino (1889–1977) / 10 days / / Military / Minister of the Interior acting as vice president.; Acting / Alfredo Duhalde (1898–1985) / 13 August 1946 / 17 October 1946 (Resigned) / Radical / Minister of the Interior acting as vice president.; Acting / Alfredo Duhalde (1898–1985) / 65 days / / Radical / Minister of the Interior acting as vice president.; Acting / Juan Antonio Iribarren (1885–1968) / 17 October 1946 / 3 November 1946 / Radical / Minister of the Interior acting as vice president.; Acting / Juan Antonio Iribarren (1885–1968) / 17 days / / Radical / Minister of the Interior acting as vice president.
25		Gabriel González Videla (1898–1980)	3 November 1946	3 November 1952	Radical	1946 (Note: Supported by the center-left Democratic Alliance)
25		Gabriel González Videla (1898–1980)	6 years		Radical	1946
26		Carlos Ibáñez del Campo (1877–1960)	3 November 1952	3 November 1958	Independent	1952
26		Carlos Ibáñez del Campo (1877–1960)	6 years		Independent	1952
27		Jorge Alessandri (1896–1986)	3 November 1958	3 November 1964	Liberal independent	1958 (Note: Supported by the Liberal and Conservative center-right)
27		Jorge Alessandri (1896–1986)	6 years		Liberal independent	1958
28		Eduardo Frei Montalva (1911–1982)	3 November 1964	3 November 1970	Christian Democratic	1964
28		Eduardo Frei Montalva (1911–1982)	6 years		Christian Democratic	1964
29		Salvador Allende (1908–1973)	3 November 1970	11 September 1973 (Died in office) (Note: Died in a military coup; he killed himself while the presidential palace was under attack.)	Socialist	1970 (Note: Supported by the left coalition Popular Unity)
29		Salvador Allende (1908–1973)	2 years, 312 days		Socialist	1970

=== Military rule (1973–1990) ===
No.	Portrait	Name (Birth–Death)	Term of office		Party	Elected
No.	Portrait	Name (Birth–Death)	Took office	Left office	Party	Elected
No.	Portrait	Name (Birth–Death)	Time in office		Party	Elected
Junta		Augusto Pinochet (1915–2006)	11 September 1973	11 March 1990	Military	None (Note: President of the Government Junta.)
Acting		Augusto Pinochet (1915–2006)	11 September 1973	11 March 1990	Military	None (Note: Supreme Chief of the Nation (appointed by decree on 17 June 1974).)
Acting		Augusto Pinochet (1915–2006)	16 years, 181 days		Military	1980

=== Presidential Republic (1990–present) ===
No.	Portrait	Name (Birth–Death)	Term of office		Party	Elected	Ref.
No.	Portrait	Name (Birth–Death)	Took office	Left office	Party	Elected	Ref.
No.	Portrait	Name (Birth–Death)	Time in office		Party	Elected	Ref.
30		Patricio Aylwin (1918–2016)	11 March 1990	11 March 1994	Christian Democratic independent (Note: He resigned from his PDC membership as a campaign promise.)	1989 (Note: Supported by the center-left coalition Concertación)	
30		Patricio Aylwin (1918–2016)	4 years (Note: Elected for a four-year term according to Temporary Provisions of the Constitution of 1980.)		Christian Democratic independent	1989	
31		Eduardo Frei Ruiz-Tagle (born 1942)	11 March 1994	11 March 2000	Christian Democratic	1993	
31		Eduardo Frei Ruiz-Tagle (born 1942)	6 years (Note: Elected for an eight-year term according to the Constitution of 1980. Days before his inauguration, the Constitutional reform of 1994 reduced the presidential term from eight to six years.)		Christian Democratic	1993	
32		Ricardo Lagos (born 1938)	11 March 2000	11 March 2006	Socialist independent (Note: Member of the PPD until 11 March 2000. He resigned from his party membership as a campaign promise.)	2000	
32		Ricardo Lagos (born 1938)	6 years (Note: The Constitutional reform of 2005 reduced the presidential term from six to four years.)		Socialist independent	2000	
33 (Note: First female president of Chile.)		Michelle Bachelet (born 1951)	11 March 2006	11 March 2010	Socialist	2006	
33		Michelle Bachelet (born 1951)	4 years		Socialist	2006	
34 (Note: First democratically elected conservative president since 1958.)		Sebastián Piñera (1949–2024)	11 March 2010	11 March 2014	Conservative independent (Note: Member of National Renewal until March 11, 2010. Resigned due to the party's statutes.)	2010 (Note: Supported by the center-right coalition Coalition for Change)	
34		Sebastián Piñera (1949–2024)	4 years		Conservative independent	2010	
35 (Note: Second term.)		Michelle Bachelet (born 1951)	11 March 2014	11 March 2018	Socialist	2013 (Note: Supported by the center-left coalition New Majority)	
35		Michelle Bachelet (born 1951)	4 years		Socialist	2013	
36		Sebastián Piñera (1949–2024)	11 March 2018	11 March 2022	Conservative independent	2017 (Note: Supported by the center-right coalition Chile Vamos)	
36		Sebastián Piñera (1949–2024)	4 years		Conservative independent	2017	
37 (Note: Youngest president.)		Gabriel Boric (born 1986)	11 March 2022	11 March 2026	Social Convergence Broad Front	2021 (Note: Supported by the left-wing coalition Apruebo Dignidad)	
37		Gabriel Boric (born 1986)	4 years		Social Convergence Broad Front	2021	
38		José Antonio Kast (born 1966)	11 March 2026	Incumbent (Term ends on 11 March 2030)	Conservative independent (Note: A member of the Republican Party until March 11, 2026, he resigned his membership as a campaign promise.)	2025 (Note: Supported by the far-right coalition Change for Chile)	
38		José Antonio Kast (born 1966)	241 days		Conservative independent	2025	

== See also ==
- President of Chile
- Presidents of Chile timeline
- Vice President of Chile
- Politics of Chile
- History of Chile
- List of government juntas of Chile
- List of female Chilean presidential candidates
