= Conservative Party (Chile) =

Conservative Party Partido Conservador
- Founded: 1836
- Dissolved: 1948
- Merger of: Pelucones, O'Higginistas and Estanqueros
- Succeeded by: Traditionalist Conservative Party
- Headquarters: Santiago de Chile
- Ideology: Conservatism (Chile); Clericalism; Traditional Catholicism; Presidentialism; Faction: Corporatism; Economic liberalism
- Political position: Right-wing
- Religion: Catholicism

The Conservative Party (in Spanish: Partido Conservador, PCon) of Chile was one of the principal Chilean political parties since its foundation in 1836 until 1948, when it broke apart. In 1953 it reformed as the United Conservative Party and in 1966 joined with the Liberal Party to form the National Party. The Conservative Party was a right-wing party, originally created to be the clericalist, pro-Catholic Church group.

== Origins: 1823-1829 ==
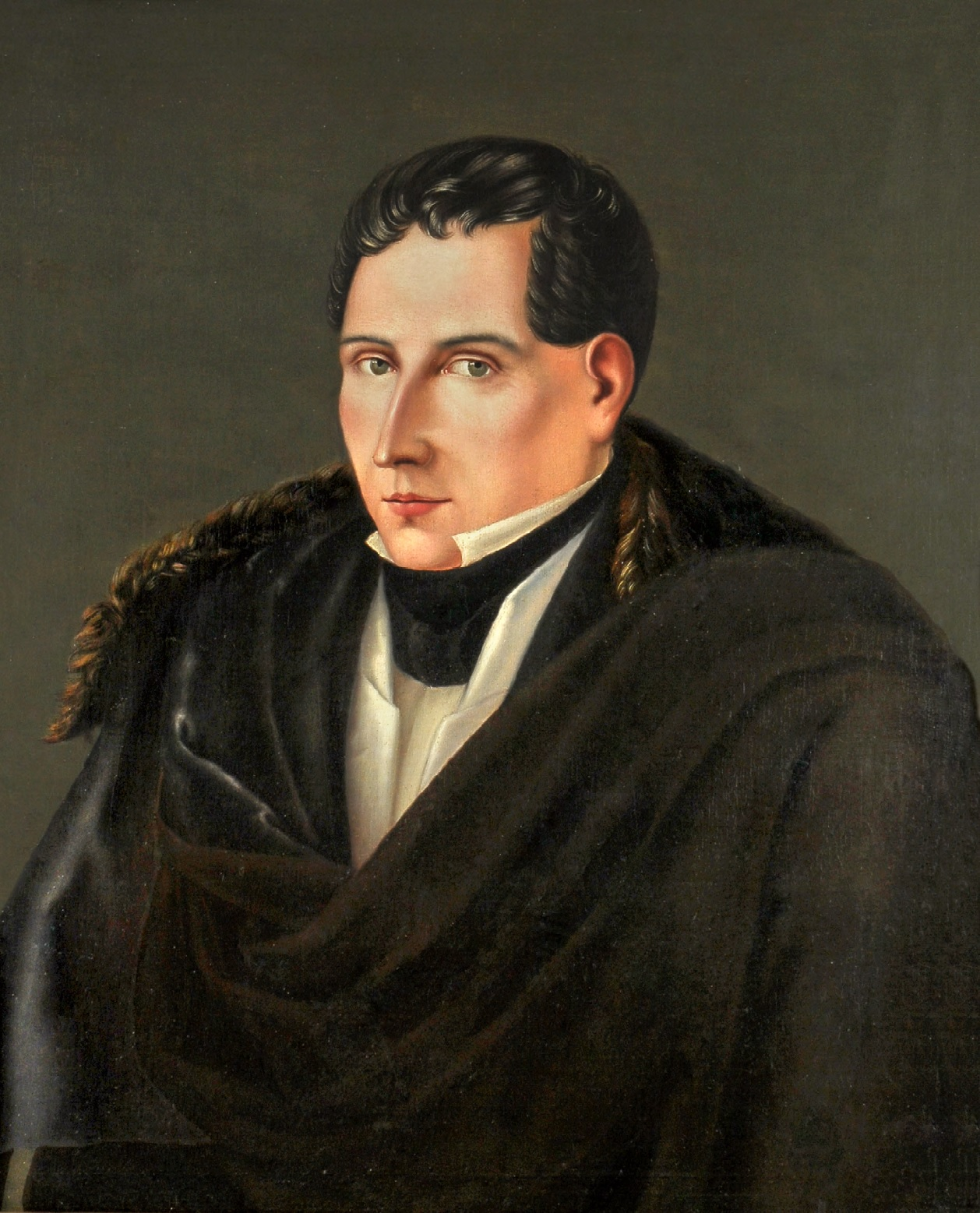
Diego Portales

The Conservative Party's origins go back to the fall of Bernardo O'Higgins' government on January 28, 1823. The Chilean political situation during those years was divided into six main groups: the pelucones, conservatives who supported authority and stability over personal freedoms; the pipiolos, who supported personal freedoms even over stability; the liberales, moderates who supported personal freedoms; the federalistas, mainly liberales and pipiolos who also supported a federalist system similar to that of the United States; the o'higginistas, supporters of O'Higgins, who had gone into exile; and the carrerinos, supporters of O'Higgins' old enemy José Miguel Carrera, who had been executed in Argentina.

After the abdication of O'Higgins, the new government of liberal Ramón Freire called for new parliamentary elections. These were won by moderates, who obtained 31 seats out of 58. The pelucones received only 4 seats, and were therefore the smallest group in Congress. In the next election, which took place in 1824, the pelucones made significant gains. They won 21 seats out of 58 in the Chamber of Deputies, becoming the second-largest group after the pipiolos. The pelucones gained control of the Chamber in 1825, when they won eight more seats. The pipiolos, however, maintained hold over the Senate.

Freire resigned in 1826, but his successor, the politically neutral admiral Manuel Blanco Encalada, was unable to govern because of a hostile Congress. In 1827, the pelucones lost control of the Chamber, and the pipiolos appointed Freire to the presidency once more. Freire resigned almost immediately and was replaced by vice president Francisco Antonio Pinto, a liberal.

Pinto's government wrote a new constitution, which stated that presidents were to be elected by a system of electors similar to that of the United States today. The candidate who received the second majority was to become vice president. Parliamentary and presidential elections were held in 1829. Pinto was reelected as president and the liberals (pipiolos and liberales) won control of Congress. Francisco Ruiz-Tagle, a pelucón, received the second majority in the presidential election and therefore should have become vice president. The liberal Congress, however, refused to accept Ruiz-Tagle as vice president and instead named a liberal, Joaquín Vicuña, to that position.

== In power: 1830-1861 ==
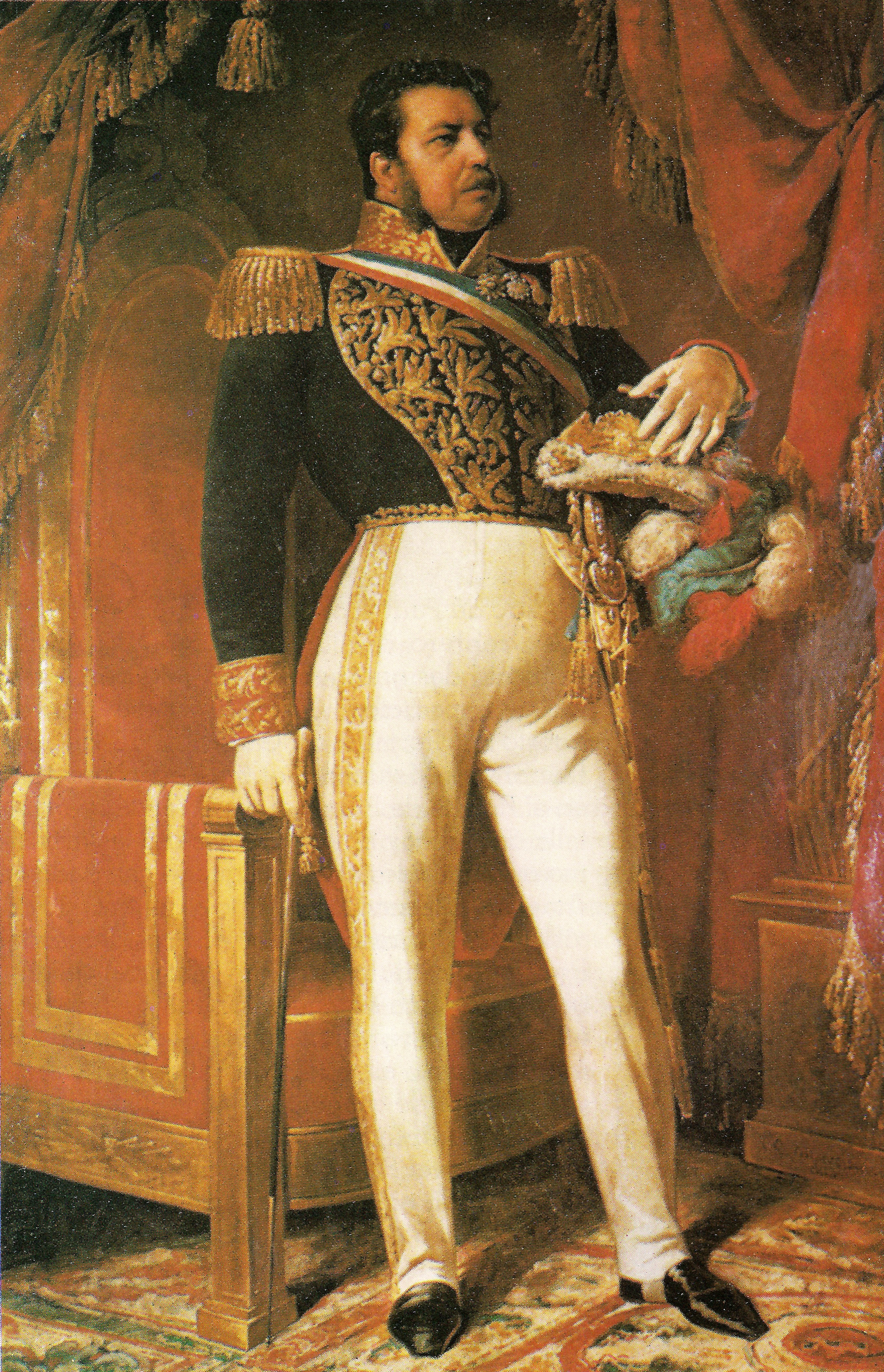
Manuel Bulnes.

Furious with this violation of the constitution, the pelucones began a revolt against the liberal-dominated government. President Pinto resigned and Vicuña refused to accept the vice presidency. A series of provisional presidents succeeded Pinto, each of them unable to quell the pelucón revolt.

This civil war saw the rise of a new group, the estanqueros, moderates who wanted an end to the political instability. This group was led by Diego Portales and became allied to the pelucón forces which finally defeated the liberals, led by former president Ramón Freire, in the Battle of Lircay of 1830. The next year, presidential elections were held and won by José Joaquín Prieto, an ex-o'higginista sympathetic to the pelucones who had led the conservative forces in Lircay.

Prieto's government was dominated by influential minister Diego Portales. Portales convinced Prieto to establish a commission to draft a new constitution. This constitution was completed and put into effect in 1833. It contained numerous authoritarian elements but nevertheless guaranteed a few essential liberties. Also under Portales' advice, Prieto declared war on the Peru-Bolivian Confederation, which had backed a failed anti-government revolt. Although Portales was assassinated before the war was over, Chile defeated the confederation, which was dissolved. This brought the pelucones a huge amount of popularity.

This popularity was reflected in the 1834 parliamentary elections, in which the pelucones received 49 seats out of 63 in the Chamber of Deputies and 10 seats out of 20 in the Senate, thus gaining control of all of Congress. Prieto was easily reelected to another five-year term in 1836. In 1841, the conservative candidate, Manuel Bulnes was elected to the presidency and reelected again in 1846. Throughout Prieto and Bulnes' presidencies, the pelucones maintained control of Congress.

== Opposition: 1861-1891 ==
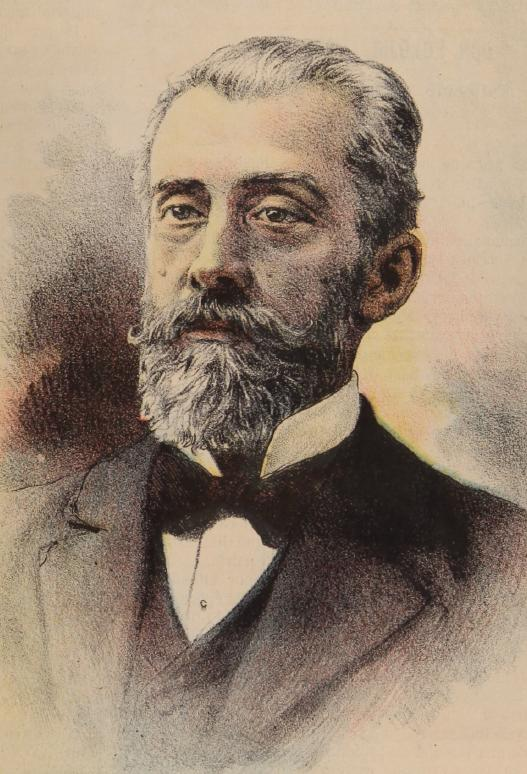
Eulogio Altamirano Aracena

In the 1851 presidential election, the conservative candidate was Manuel Montt. He triumphed, but many conservatives were unhappy with him and accused him of anticlericalism. In 1851, the Conservative Party was officially formed by the anti-Montt pelucones. Although Montt won reelection in 1856, the Conservative Party defeated his National Party in the parliamentary elections of 1858.

The Conservative, National, and Liberal parties all agreed to support José Joaquín Pérez, a National, in the 1861 presidential election. In the parliamentary elections that year, however, the conservatives lost control of Congress, finishing in third-place after the Nationals and Liberals.

Some conservatives refused to support Pérez for reelection in 1866, instead supporting the ailing Manuel Bulnes, who was defeated. The liberals won Congress in 1867. The Conservative and Liberal Parties then created the Liberal-Conservative Fusion, which brought Federico Errázuriz Zañartu to the presidency in 1871.

The alliance soon broke down, however. The liberals began employing electoral fraud in order to maintain their control over the government. There were no opposition candidates in the presidential elections of 1876, 1881 or 1886. Thanks to electoral fraud, liberals maintained complete control over Congress. In one instance, liberal president Domingo Santa María even admitted fraud was occurring, stating that "I have been accused of electoral intervention. I have intervened. I belong to the old school and participate in electoral intervention because I want an efficient, disciplined Parliament. [...] I cannot allow the legacy of Portales, Bulnes, Montt and Errázuriz to be destroyed."

As a result, the Conservative Party was unable to participate in government until 1891. That year, president José Manuel Balmaceda's fights with Congress had reached a climax and he decided to dissolve Congress. In response, Congress impeached Balmaceda. The Congressional forces, helped mainly by the Navy, set up an alternative government led by Jorge Montt in Iquique. After a series of Congressional victories, they reached Santiago and deposed Balmaceda, who fled to the Argentine embassy and committed suicide.

== The "Parliamentary Republic": 1891-1920 ==
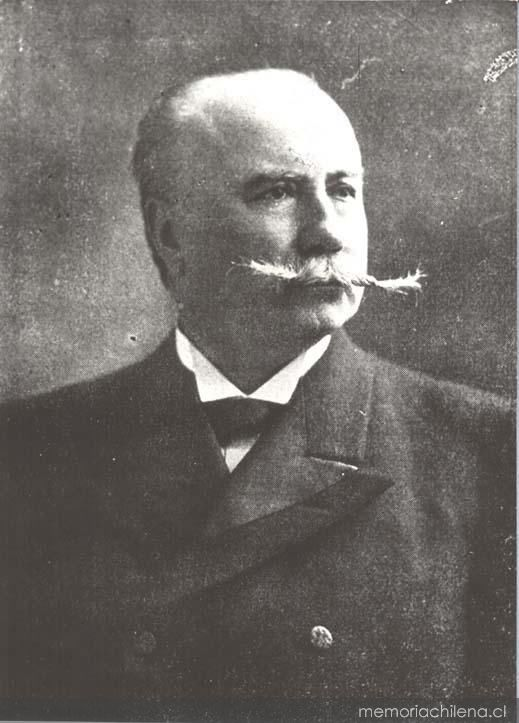
Carlos Walker Martínez.

Jorge Montt called for presidential and parliamentary elections that year. He was the only candidate for the presidency, supported by the Conservative, Liberal, and Radical parties, and won unanimously. In the first free and clean parliamentary elections for almost a half-century, the Conservative Party won the majority of the seats in the Chamber of Deputies, but won only 4 seats out of 32 in the Senate. The Congressional forces established what became known as the "Parliamentary Republic". The president became little more than a figurehead, and Congress' power grew immensely.

The Conservative Party won all of Congress in 1894, but their candidate, Pedro Montt, lost in the 1901 presidential election. Throughout the Parliamentary Republic period, the Conservatives were one of the dominant parties in Congress. Nevertheless, the excessive power of the legislative body made government ineffective in the eyes of many, leading to the crisis of the 1920s.

During this period, the conservatives joined with other small, like-minded groups to form the alliance known as the Coalition. The Coalition candidate in the contentious 1915 presidential election, Juan Luis Sanfuentes, won with just a little more than 50% of the vote.

== Anarchy and Stability: 1920-1938 ==
In the 1920 presidential election, the Conservative Party teamed up with a group of dissident liberals to form the National Union alliance. Their candidate in the elections was the liberal Luis Barros Borgoño, who competed with Arturo Alessandri of the Liberal Alliance. The election was very violent and in the end Barros won the popular vote but Alessandri won the electoral vote. Finally, a special tribunal declared Alessandri the victor by a single electoral vote. The next year, however, conservatives won control of Congress.

The inefficiency of government angered many Chileans, particularly in the army. Finally, in 1924, the army revolted and Alessandri resigned. A junta, led by Luis Altamirano, governed until 1925, when General Carlos Ibáñez and Commodore Marmaduque Grove led a counter-coup that deposed Altamirano and brought Alessandri back. The traditional political parties, including the conservatives, played no part in these coups. Alessandri resigned once more in 1925 because of the excessive power wielded by General Ibáñez.

The Conservatives, Liberals, and Radicals all agreed to support Emiliano Figueroa in the 1925 presidential election. Figueroa won with an overwhelming 71%. Nevertheless, Ibáñez's pressure led to Figueroa's resignation as well, and in 1927 new elections were held. The Conservative Party chose not to participate, and Ibáñez won with 98%.

During Ibáñez's dictatorship, Congress was dissolved. Finally, in 1930, Ibáñez called the political party leaders for a meeting in the Chillán thermal baths, a popular tourist destination. To avoid a victory by his opponents, Ibáñez asked each party to nominate potential Congressmen. Then, Ibáñez himself appointed a Chamber of Deputies and a Senate. In this Congress, known as the "Thermal Congress" because of the place where it was decided on, the Conservatives received only 24 seats in the Chamber out of 133. In the Senate, they got 10 out of 42.

Ibáñez was unable to solve the problems caused by the Great Depression and fled the country in 1931. Conservatives, Liberals, and Radicals all agreed to support Juan Esteban Montero (a Radical) in the presidential election. Montero won, but was likewise unable to solve Chile's economic problems. In the end, even his own party abandoned him. Supported only by the Liberals and Conservatives, Montero was deposed by a military coup led by socialist Commodore Marmaduque Grove. Grove was deposed in a counter-coup led by radical Carlos Dávila. Amid the political turmoil, Dávila resigned and was replaced by Bartolomé Blanche, who restored democracy.

A presidential election was held in 1932. The Conservative Party candidate, Héctor Rodríguez finished in third place with only 14% of the vote. Nevertheless, the winner, Arturo Alessandri, was also a right-winger and received the Conservative Party's support during his presidency.

During Alessandri's presidency, a social-Christian faction of the Conservative Party became more powerful. Finally, in 1935, they broke away and created the Falange Nacional (National Falange), which was to give way to the Christian Democrat Party of Chile.

== The Divided Right-Wing: 1938-1953 ==
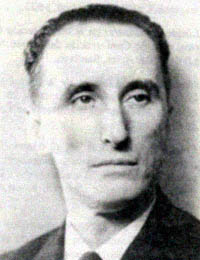
Eduardo Cruz-Coke

In the 1938 presidential election, the right-wing candidate, Gustavo Ross, supported by the Liberal and Conservative Parties, was defeated by Pedro Aguirre Cerda. Conservatives and Liberals were by now very similar ideologically, but they refused to unite. Additionally, despite the formation of the Falange Nacional, some social-Christians remained in the Conservative Party.

The 1942 presidential election was another divisive moment for the right. Both the Conservative and Liberal parties agreed to support the candidacy of Carlos Ibáñez. However, the pro-Alessandri elements in both parties refused to do so, arguing that Ibáñez was an ambitious former dictator. These groups broke away and formed the Movimiento Liberal Antifascista (Liberal Anti-Fascist Movement), and supported the left-wing candidate Juan Antonio Ríos, who won.

The Liberal and Conservative parties were unable to agree on a candidate for the 1946 presidential election. The Conservatives nominated Eduardo Cruz-Coke, who finished in second place after radical Gabriel González Videla. During González's presidency, the Conservatives enjoyed a brief stay in power when González broke with the communists who had supported him.

In 1948, the Conservative Party ceased to exist. The social-Christian elements created the Social Christian Conservative Party and their opponents created the Traditionalist Conservative Party. In the 1952 presidential election, the Traditionalist Conservatives and the Liberal Party nominated Arturo Matte as their candidate, while the National Falange, the Radical Party, and the Social Christian Conservative Party supported Pedro Alfonso. Both lost to independent Carlos Ibáñez.

== Unity and Fall: 1953-1966 ==
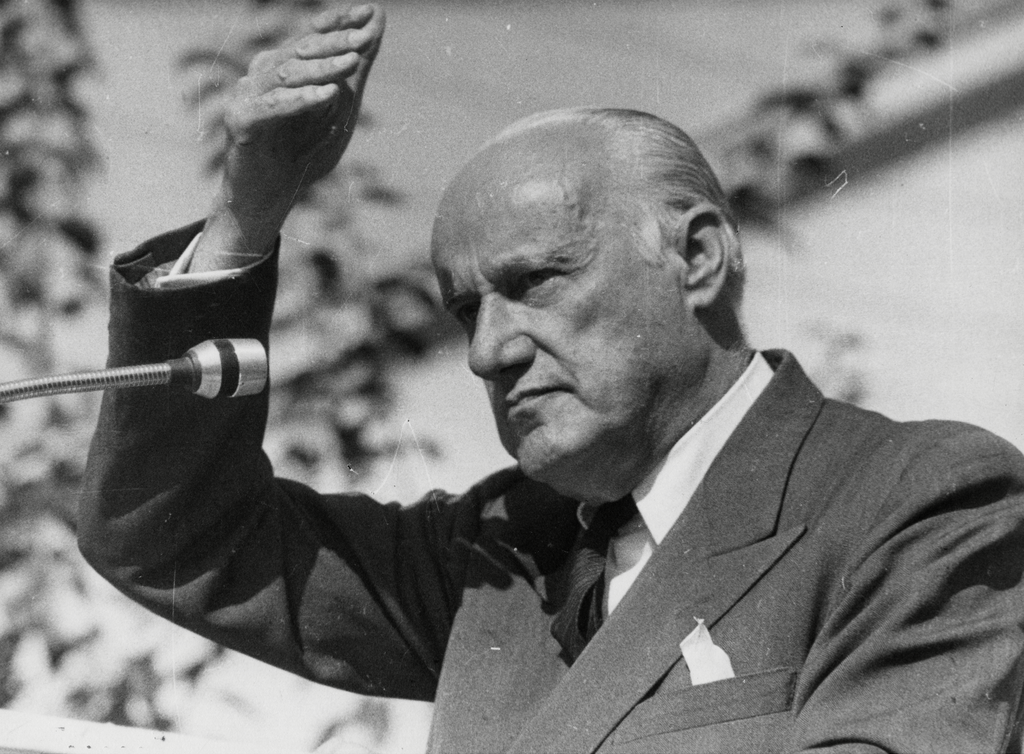
Jorge Alessandri

In December 1953, the Traditionalist Conservative Party joined with part of the Social Christian Conservative Party and formed the United Conservative Party. The other half of the Social Christian Conservatives joined with the Falange Nacional in 1957 and formed the Christian Democrat Party.

The United Conservative Party and the Liberal Party backed independent Jorge Alessandri in the 1958 presidential election. He triumphed with 32%, defeating socialist Salvador Allende and Christian Democrat Eduardo Frei Montalva. In the parliamentary elections, however, the conservatives did not do well. In 1961, they won only 17 seats out of 150 in the Chamber and zero seats in the Senate. In 1965, the right-wing suffered a historic low. In the Chamber, Conservatives and Liberals won only 3 seats each, and in the Senate the Liberals won 1 seat and the Conservatives none.

In response to this huge loss, the conservatives and liberals united to form the National Party in 1966, under which they staged a political comeback in the next election.

== Presidential candidates ==
The following is a list of the presidential candidates supported by the Conservative Party or the pelucones. (Information gathered from the Archive of Chilean Elections).

- 1829: Francisco Ruiz-Tagle (lost), Diego José Benavente (lost)
- 1831: José Joaquín Prieto (won)
- 1836: José Joaquín Prieto (won)
- 1841: Manuel Bulnes (won)
- 1846: Manuel Bulnes (won)
- 1851: Manuel Montt (won)
- 1856: José Santiago Aldunate (lost)
- 1861: José Joaquín Pérez (won)
- 1866: José Joaquín Pérez (won), Manuel Bulnes (lost)
- 1871: Federico Errázuriz Zañartu (won)
- 1876: none
- 1881: Manuel Baquedano (lost)
- 1886: none
- 1891: Jorge Montt (won)
- 1896: Federico Errázuriz Echaurren (won)
- 1901: Pedro Montt (lost)
- 1906: Fernando Lazcano (lost)
- 1910: Ramón Barros Luco (won)
- 1915: Juan Luis Sanfuentes (won)
- 1920: Luis Barros Borgoño (lost)
- 1925: Emiliano Figueroa (won)
- 1927: none
- 1931: Juan Esteban Montero (won)
- 1932: Héctor Rodríguez (lost)
- 1938: Gustavo Ross (lost)
- 1942: Carlos Ibáñez (lost)
- 1946: Eduardo Cruz-Coke (lost)

== Sources ==
- San Francisco, Alejandro, and Ángel Soto, eds. Camino a La Moneda. Santiago: Centro De Estudios Bicentenario, 2005.
