= Álvaro Covarrubias =

Chilean politician

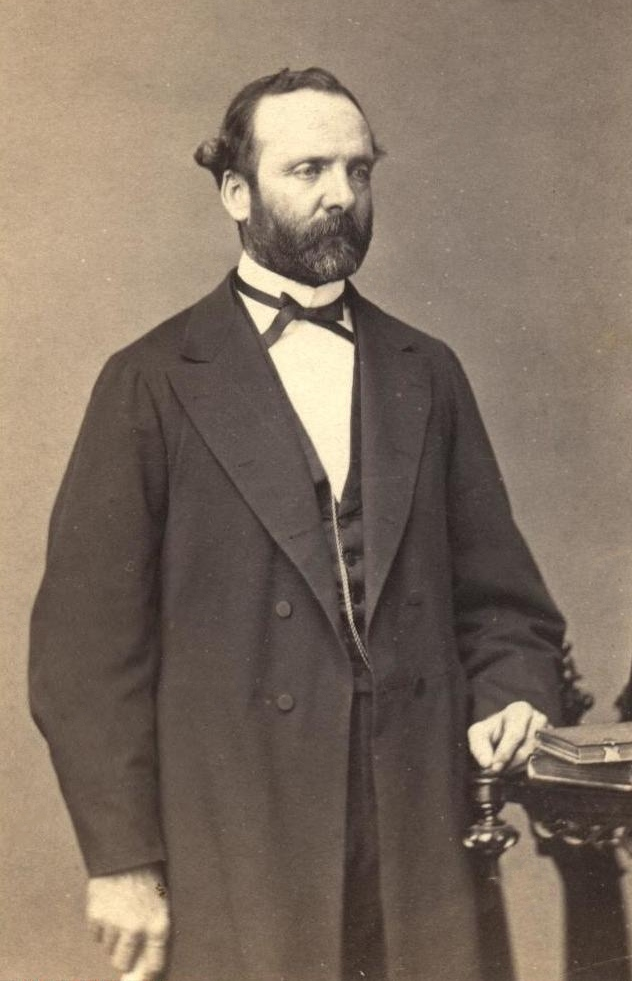

President of the Senate
- In office 1870–1882

Personal details
- Born: 19 February 1824 Santiago, Chile
- Died: 24 April 1899 (aged 75) Santiago, Chile
- Party: Liberal Party (1842–1899)
- Education: University of Chile (LL.B)
- Occupation: Politician
- Profession: Lawyer

Álvaro José Miguel Covarrubias Ortúzar (born 19 February 1824 – 24 April 1899) was a Chilean politician and lawyer who served as President of the Senate of Chile. He also stood as an independent candidate in the Chilean presidential elections in 1871, 1876, 1881 and 1886.

== Biography ==
Álvaro Covarrubias was born on 19 February 1824 in Santiago de Chile. He was the son of Manuel Covarrubias Ortúzar, a Chilean deputy, and María de la Luz Ortúzar Formas. His younger brother Ramón Covarrubias Ortúzar was a member of the Conservative Party of Chile.

Covarrubias attended the Instituto Nacional in Santiago where he took courses on law. In 1845 he began his studies at the University of Chile in the academy of law and forensics. Two years later he graduated as a lawyer with a thesis about the majorat in Chile. In 1857 he started teaching as a professor in the Faculty of Law and Political Science at the University of Chile.

During his lifetime Covarrubias was a member of the Liberal Party of Chile. He ran for the office of president four times, though as an independent candidate. In the 1871 presidential election he gained 0.35% of the votes. During the presidency of the conservative Manuel Montt (1851-1861), Covarrubias was persecuted for his beliefs and affiliation with the Liberal Party.

Beginning in 1870 Covarrubias served as the President of the Senate of Chile until 1873. Several years later, in 1876, he became President of the Senate once more, keeping the position until 1882.

Covarrubias died on 24 April 1899 aged 75 years.

== Political Positions ==
- Substitute Rapporteur of the Santiago Court of Appeals (1852)
- Substitute Minister of the Santiago Court of Appeals (1863)
- Minister of Foreign Affairs (1864-1868)
- Minister of the Supreme Court (1869-1889)
- President of the Senate of the Republic of Chile (1870-1873 and 1876-1882)
- Senator of the Liberal Party (1888-1894)
