= Liberal Party (Chile, 1849) =

Liberal Party Partido Liberal
- In political campaigns, the Liberal Party often used a torch as their symbol.
- Founded: 1849
- Dissolved: 11 May 1966
- Merger of: Pipiolos and Federalists
- Merged into: National Party
- Headquarters: Santiago de Chile
- Ideology: Liberalism; Classical liberalism Economic liberalism
- Political position: 1849-1860s: Left-wing; 1860s-1891: Centre-left; 1891-1932: Centre; 1932-1966: Centre-right

The Liberal Party (Spanish: Partido Liberal) was a Chilean political party created by a faction of pipiolos in 1849. After the conservative victory in the Chilean Civil War of 1829 the liberals became the principal opposition party to the Conservative Party. During the Liberal Party's early history one of its main goal was to create a new constitution to replace the Chilean Constitution of 1833. Rigged election helped to prevent the Liberal Party's presidential candidates to be elected until 1861, during that time elements of the liberal party made attempts to overthrow the government, these were the Revolution of 1851 and the Revolution of 1859. These failed insurrections led many liberals to emigrate, among them Benjamín Vicuña Mackenna. In 1863 a group of liberal split off to form the Radical Party which would hold power from 1938 to 1952. Originally an anticlericalist party that championed classical liberalism, the liberals later became a right-wing party.

In 1966 the Liberal Party joined with their old antagonists, the United Conservative Party, to form the National Party.

== Presidents elected under Liberal Party ==
- 1871 - Federico Errázuriz Zañartu
- 1876 - Aníbal Pinto
- 1881 - Domingo Santa María
- 1886 - José Manuel Balmaceda
- 1896 - Federico Errázuriz Echaurren
- 1901 - Germán Riesco
- 1910 - Ramón Barros Luco
- 1920 - Arturo Alessandri
- 1932 - Arturo Alessandri

== Presidential candidates ==
The following is a list of the presidential candidates supported by the Liberal Party or the pipiolos. (Information gathered from the Archive of Chilean Elections).

- 1829: Francisco Antonio Pinto (won), Joaquín Vicuña (lost)
- 1831: none
- 1836: none
- 1841: Francisco Antonio Pinto (lost)
- 1846: none
- 1851: José María de la Cruz (lost)
- 1856: none
- 1861: José Joaquín Pérez (won)
- 1866: José Joaquín Pérez (won)
- 1871: Federico Errázuriz Zañartu (won), José Tomás de Urmeneta (lost)
- 1876: Aníbal Pinto (won)
- 1881: Domingo Santa María (won), Manuel Baquedano (lost)
- 1886: José Manuel Balmaceda (won)
- June 1891: Claudio Vicuña (won)
- October 1891: Jorge Montt (won)
- 1896: Vicente Reyes (lost)
- 1901: Germán Riesco (won)
- 1906: Pedro Montt (won)
- 1910: Ramón Barros Luco (won)
- 1915: Javier Ángel Figueroa (lost)
- 1920: Alliance faction: Arturo Alessandri (won), Union faction: Luis Barros Borgoño (lost)
- 1925: Emiliano Figueroa (won)
- 1927: none
- 1931: Juan Esteban Montero (won), Arturo Alessandri (lost)
- 1932: Arturo Alessandri (won), Enrique Zañartu Prieto (lost)
- 1938: Gustavo Ross (lost)
- 1942: Carlos Ibáñez (lost)
- 1946: Fernando Alessandri (lost)
- 1952: Arturo Matte (lost)
- 1958: Jorge Alessandri (won)
- 1964: Eduardo Frei Montalva (won)

== See also ==
- Category:Liberal Party (Chile, 1849) politicians
- Liberal Party of Chile (2013)
- Armando Jaramillo Valderrama
