= Gerardo Smitmans =

Chilean politician

Member of the Senate
- In office 15 May 1926 – 15 May 1930
- Constituency: 8th Provincial Grouping
- In office 1 June 1924 – 11 September 1924

Member of the Chamber of Deputies
- In office 15 May 1912 – 15 May 1921
- Constituency: Angol and Traiguén
- In office 13 July 1911 – 15 May 1912
- Constituency: Angol, Traiguén, Mariluán and Collipulli

Personal details
- Born: 17 December 1876 Angol, Chile
- Died: 2 May 1953 (aged 76) Santiago, Chile
- Party: Liberal Party
- Spouse: Mercedes López Torres
- Occupation: Agriculturist, politician

Gerardo Augusto Smitmans Rothamel (17 December 1876 – 2 May 1953) was a Chilean agriculturist and politician who served as deputy and later as senator of the Republic. Initially a member of the Radical Party, he later joined the Liberal Party and played a role in regional political life in southern Chile.
