= Radical Party of Chile =

Defunct Chilean political party

Radical Party Partido Radical
- Leader (s): Manuel Antonio Matta, Ramón Allende Padín, Enrique Mac Iver, Juan Esteban Montero, Pedro Aguirre Cerda, Juan Antonio Ríos, Gabriel González Videla, Anselmo Sule
- Founded: 27 December 1863
- Dissolved: 18 August 1994; 12 February 2026
- Split from: Liberal Party
- Merged into: Social Democrat Radical Party
- Headquarters: Santiago de Chile
- Youth wing: Juventud Radical de Chile
- Ideology: Liberalism; Radicalism; Anti-clericalism; Social liberalism
- Political position: Centre-left
- National affiliation: Liberal Alliance (1891–1925); Popular Front (1937–41); Democratic Alliance (1942–47); Democratic Front (1962–64); Popular Unity (1969–73); Concertación (1988–1994)
- International affiliation: Socialist International (1981–94)
- Colours: Blue, white, red

The Radical Party (Spanish: Partido Radical) was a Chilean political party. It was formed in 1863 in Copiapó by a split in the Liberal Party. Not coincidentally, it was formed shortly after the organization of the Grand Lodge of Chile, and has maintained a close relationship with Chilean Freemasonry throughout its life. It has historically represented an anticlericalist position in Chilean politics, and was instrumental in producing the "theological reforms" in Chilean law in the early 1880s.

These laws removed the cemeteries from the control of the Roman Catholic Church, established a civil registry of births and death in place of the previous recordkeeping of the church, and established a civil law of matrimony, which removed the determination of validity of marriages from the church. Prior to these laws, it was impossible for non-Catholics to contract marriage in Chile, and meant that any children they produced were illegitimate. Non-Catholics had also been barred from burial in Catholic cemeteries, which were virtually the only cemeteries in the country; instead, non-Catholics were buried in the beaches, and even on the Santa Lucia Hill in Santiago, which, in the 19th century, functioned as Santiago's dump.

In the 20th century, the radicals adopted a moderately center-left stance, taking part to Pedro Aguirre Cerda's Popular Front and then to the Democratic Alliance left-wings coalition which succeeded to Cerda's death. During the presidency of Gabriel Gonzalez Videla (1946–1952) it shifted to the right, and many of its members were anti-Communists. In 1950s, the party started to lose ground. At the end of the 1960s, left-wingers gained upper hand in the Radical party, causing some of the more right-wing leaders to leave the party. The anticommunist Radicals formed the Radical Democracy. In the crucial 1970 election, which resulted in the presidency of Salvador Allende, they formed an alliance with the right-wing National Party and, later, supported Pinochet's 1973 coup. In contrast, the Radical Party was part of the Unidad Popular coalition supporting Salvador Allende who became president in 1970. Radicals, supporting gradual reforms, were generally loyal to the leftist governing coalition.

In its XXV Congress that took place from 31 July to 5 August 1971, the Radical Party confirmed the left-wing line it had taken already in 1967. The congress demanded that the Radicals discard bourgeois democracy as an instrument of capitalist domination and declared the Radical Party was now a socialist party which subscribed to class struggle and historical materialism. On 3 August, Senators Bossay, Baltra, Acuña, Juliet and Aguirre and deputies Ibáñez, Magalahes, Naudón, Basso, Clavel, Sharpe and Muñoz Barra left the Radical Party. They founded a new party of radicals with more moderate views, paradoxically called Partido Izquierda Radical (Radical Left Party). The new party initially remained part of the Unidad Popular. On the other hand, a moderate Social Democrat Party, up to then an independent party within the Unidad Popular bloc, merged with the Radical Party. During that time, the Radical Party of Chile declared their organization to be socialist and they officially adhered to the doctrines of historical materialism, class struggle, and anti-capitalism. Like other parties, it was banned after the 11 September 1973 coup.

In 1983, the Radical Party was one of the creators along with the Christian Democrat, Liberal, Social Democrat parties and the renewed sector of the Socialist Party of Chile, of the Democratic Alliance coalition opposing the Pinochet regime. Another area of radicalism, led by Luis Fernando Luengo, came to the United Left and founded the Democratic Socialist Radical Party (PRSD). Both parties supported the option NO in the plebiscite of 1988 and proclaimed Patricio Aylwin as their presidential candidate, but in the parliamentary elections of 1989 were presented in different lists; the PR was part of the coalition, while the PRSD participated in the list Unity for the Democracy with Broad Party of Socialist Left. After the return to democracy, the Radical Party reformed as a center-left group, and joined the Concertación de Partidos por la Democracia, a coalition of parties which also included the Christian Democrats and the Socialists. Its electoral strength was greatly reduced from that which it had enjoyed between 1880 and 1950. In 1994 joined with the Social Democracy Party to form the Social Democrat Radical Party (PRSD).

== Presidents elected under Radical Party of Chile ==
- 1932 - Juan Esteban Montero
- 1938 - Pedro Aguirre Cerda
- 1942 - Juan Antonio Ríos
- 1946 - Gabriel González Videla

== Presidential candidates ==
The following is a list of the presidential candidates supported by the Radical Party. (Information gathered from the Archive of Chilean Elections).

- 1866: Pedro León Gallo (lost)
- 1871: José Tomás de Urmeneta (lost)
- 1876: Aníbal Pinto (won)
- 1881: Domingo Santa María (won)
- 1886: none
- 1891: Jorge Montt (won)
- 1896: Vicente Reyes (lost)
- 1901: Germán Riesco (won)
- 1906: Pedro Montt (won)
- 1910: Ramón Barros Luco (won)
- 1915: Javier Ángel Figueroa (lost)
- 1920: Arturo Alessandri (won)
- 1925: Emiliano Figueroa (won)
- 1927: none
- 1931: Juan Esteban Montero (won)
- 1932: Arturo Alessandri (won)
- 1938: Pedro Aguirre Cerda (won)
- 1942: Juan Antonio Ríos (won)
- 1946: Gabriel González Videla (won)
- 1952: Pedro Alfonso (lost)
- 1958: Luis Bossay (lost)
- 1964: Julio Durán (lost)
- 1970: Salvador Allende (won)
- 1988: Plebiscite to extend term of Augusto Pinochet: "No" (won)
- 1989: Patricio Aylwin (won)
- 1993: Eduardo Frei Ruiz-Tagle (won)

== See also ==
- Category:Radical Party of Chile politicians
