= 1836 election =

1836 election may refer to:

- Chilean presidential election, 1836
- 1836 United States presidential election
- 1836 United States House of Representatives elections
