= 1856 elections =

1856 election may refer to:

- Chilean presidential election, 1856
- 1856 United States presidential election
- United States House of Representatives elections, 1856
