= Carlos Schürmann =

Chilean politician

Carlos Schürmann (20 May 1880 – 30 September 1941) was a Chilean politician. A member of the Radical Party, he served in the Senate of Chile.
