= Hermógenes Labbé =

Chilean politician

Hermógenes Labbé (born 1889) was a Chilean politician. A member of the Liberal Party, he served in the Chamber of Deputies of Chile.
