= Nicanor Silva =

Chilean politician

Member of the Senate
- In office 15 May 1926 – 6 June 1932
- Constituency: 6th Provincial Grouping

Personal details
- Born: Chile
- Died: September 1937 Chile
- Party: Radical Party
- Occupation: Politician

Nicanor Silva Silva (– September 1937) was a Chilean politician and member of the Radical Party who served as senator of the Republic.

He died in September 1937.
