= Vicente Reyes =

Vicente Reyes may refer to:

- Vicente Reyes (politician) (1835–1918), Chilean lawyer, journalist and politician
- Vicente Reyes (footballer) (born 2003), Chilean footballer

== See also ==
- Vicente Reynés (born 1981), Spanish cyclist
