= Carlos Werner =

Chilean politician

Carlos Werner (23 September 1864 – 31 December 1926) was a Chilean politician. A member of the Liberal Party, he served in the Senate of Chile.
