= Pipiolo =

Pipiolo may refer to:

- Pipiolos the name under which early 19th century Chilean liberals were known under
- The Puerto Rican Independence Party
