= Guillermo Bahamonde =

Chilean politician

Guillermo Bahamonde (1878 – 26 August 1915) was a Chilean politician. A member of the Radical Party, he served in the Chamber of Deputies of Chile.
