= Luis Garnham =

Chilean politician

Luis Garnham Moreno (29 April 1866 – 1942) was a Chilean politician. A member of the Liberal Party, he served in the Senate of Chile.
