= Timeline of presidents of Chile =

The timeline shows changes, both personal or title, of the head of state and the head of government of the Republic of Chile from 18 September 1810 until today, regardless of whether president, vice-president, supreme director, interim or junta.

== Notable ==
- Presidents died before the end of term:

Federico Errázuriz Echaurren, Pedro Montt, Elías Fernández, Pedro Aguirre Cerda, Juan Antonio Ríos, Salvador Allende

- Presidents democratically elected then resigned or overthrown:

José Manuel Balmaceda, Arturo Alessandri, Emiliano Figueroa, Carlos Ibáñez del Campo, Salvador Allende

- the shortest and longest terms:

Pedro Opazo (one day) and Augusto Pinochet (17 years)

- Most non-consecutive periods:

Arturo Alessandri (three times, although his second term is seen as termination of the first term)

== See also ==
- President of Chile
- List of presidents of Chile
