= 1851 Chilean presidential election =

Presidential elections were held in Chile in July 1851. Carried out through a system of electors, they resulted in the election of Manuel Montt as president. Montt was the country's first non-military president.

Montt's opponent, José María de la Cruz, refused to accept the results and started a rebellion, the Revolution of 1851, in Concepción. He was defeated by former president Manuel Bulnes.

== Results ==
Candidate	Party	Votes	%
Manuel Montt	Independent (Conservative)	132	81.48
José María de la Cruz	Liberal Party	29	17.90
Ramón Errázuriz	Independent (Conservative)	1	0.62
Total		162	100.00
Source: Chilean Elections Database
