= 1871 Chilean presidential election =

Presidential elections were held in Chile in 1871. Carried out through a system of electors, they resulted in the election of Federico Errázuriz Zañartu as president.

== Results ==
Candidate	Party	Votes	%
Federico Errázuriz Zañartu	Liberal–Conservative	226	79.30
José Tomás de Urmeneta	National–Radical–Liberal	58	20.35
Álvaro Covarrubias	Independent	1	0.35
Total		285	100.00
Source: Chilean Elections Database
