= 1931 Chilean presidential election =

- 4 October 1931
- Registered: 388,959
- Turnout: 73.47% (▲3.08pp)
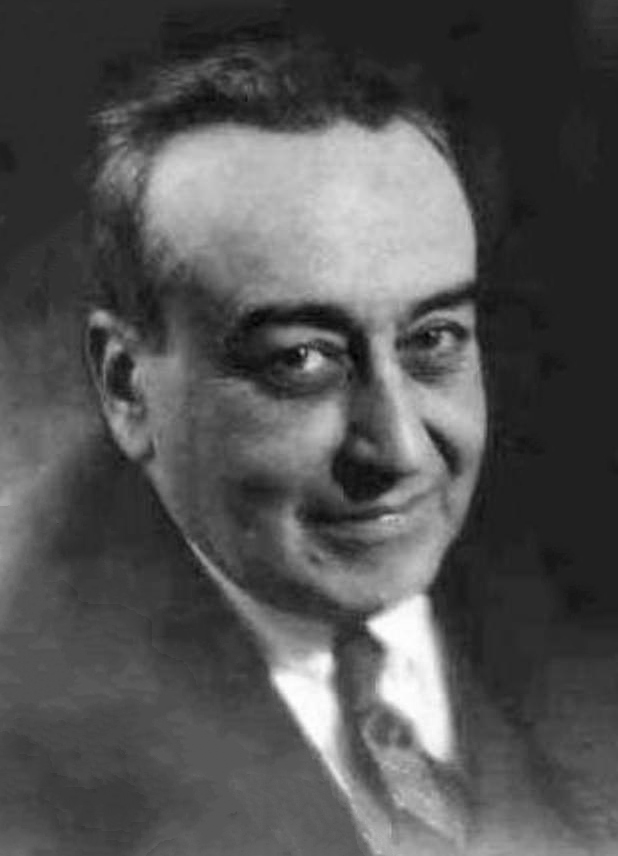

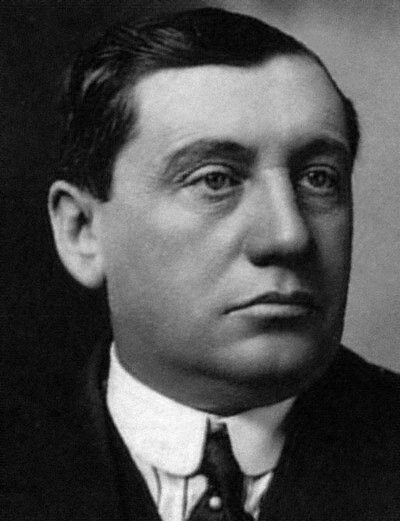
Nominee	Juan Esteban Montero	Arturo Alessandri
Party	Radical	Liberal
Popular vote	182,177	99,075
Percentage	63.94%	34.77%
President before election
Manuel Trucco (acting)
Radical
Elected President
Juan Esteban Montero
Radical

Presidential elections were held in Chile on 4 October 1931. The result was a landslide victory for Juan Esteban Montero of the Radical Party, who received 64% of the vote. He was the first member of the Radical Party to be elected president.

The elections took place amid economic turmoil due to the Great Depression and in the aftermath of the toppling of Carlos Ibáñez del Campo's military government.

== Electoral system ==
The election was held using the absolute majority system, under which a candidate had to receive over 50% of the popular vote to be elected. If no candidate received over 50% of the vote, both houses of the National Congress would come together to vote on the two candidates who received the most votes.

== Results ==
Candidate	Party	Votes	%
Juan Esteban Montero	Radical Party	182,177	63.94
Arturo Alessandri	Liberal Party	99,075	34.77
Elías Lafertte	Communist Party	2,434	0.85
Manuel Hidalgo	Communist Left	1,226	0.43
Total		284,912	100.00
Valid votes		284,912	99.70
Invalid/blank votes		861	0.30
Total votes		285,773	100.00
Registered voters/turnout		388,959	73.47
Source: Gamonal, Nohlen
