= Communist Left (Chile) =

The Communist Left (Spanish: Izquierda Comunista) was a political party in Chile. The party was founded by Senator Manuel Hidalgo in 1931, as a split from the Communist Party of Chile. The organization organized various illegal trade unions. In 1937 the party merged into the Socialist Party.
