= 1896 Chilean presidential election =

- 1896
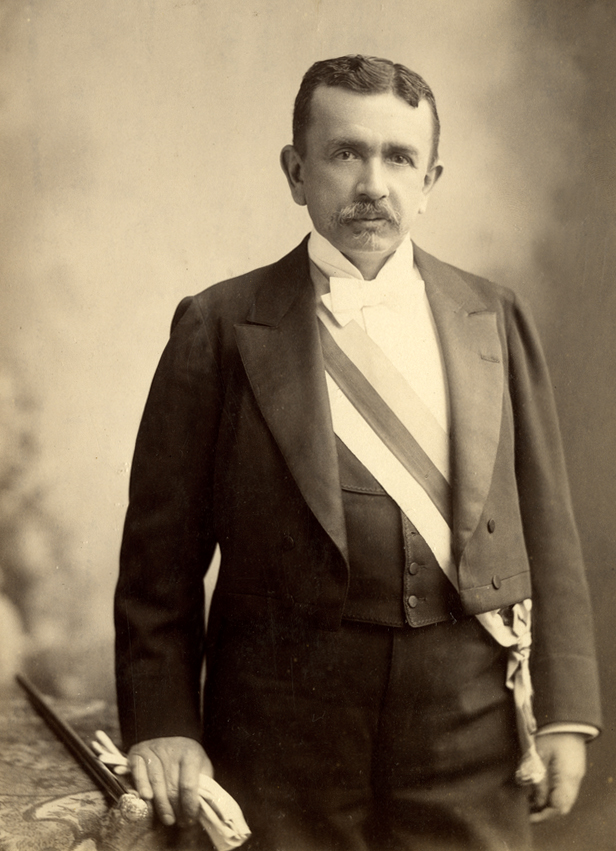

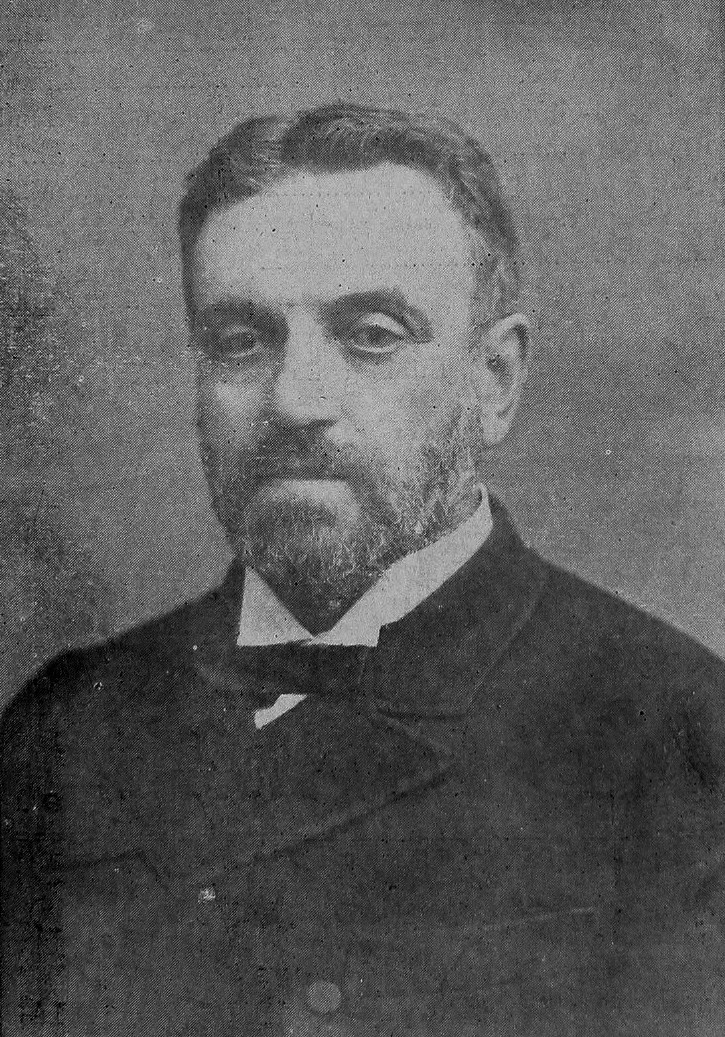
Candidate	Federico Errázuriz Echaurren	Vicente Reyes
Party	Coalition	Liberal Alliance
Electoral vote	137	134
Congress vote	62	60
President before election
Jorge Montt
Liberal–Radical–Conservative
President
Federico Errázuriz Echaurren
Coalition

Presidential elections were held in Chile in 1896. Carried out through a system of electors, they resulted in the election of Federico Errázuriz Echaurren as president. However, the elections were marred by controversy and there had to be a confirmation vote in Congress to satisfy Errázuriz's opponents.

== Campaign ==
For this campaign the political forces organized themselves in two big alliances: Liberal-Conservative Coalition, whose candidate was Federico Errázuriz Echaurren, and the Liberal Alliance, whose candidate was the Senator for Santiago Vicente Reyes Palazuelos.

The campaign itself was furious and fairly even. Reyes was a member of the Doctrinary Liberal party and boasted of being a "free-thinker". On the other hand, Errázuriz was very popular with the conservatives and belonged to a well-known political family of impeccable catholic credentials. The economic issues also came to the fore: Reyes and his followers were in favor of going back to the metallic conversion, while Errázuriz (whose voting base was heavily influenced by the large land-owners and agricultural producers) was in favor of a variable conversion system that could keep the exchange rate favorable for their exports.

After a very close vote, in which the decision Errázuriz won, the Liberal Alliance refused to recognize the result. The decision was moved to the full congress, where finally Errázuriz prevailed by only two votes.

== Results ==
Candidate	Party	Electoral vote		Congressional vote	
Candidate	Party	Votes	%	Votes	%
Federico Errázuriz Echaurren	Coalition	137	50.55	62	50.82
Vicente Reyes	Liberal Alliance	134	49.45	60	49.18
Total		271	100.00	122	100.00
Valid votes		271	96.10	122	100.00
Invalid/blank votes		11	3.90	0	0.00
Total votes		282	100.00	122	100.00
Registered voters/turnout				123	99.19
Source: Chilean Elections Database
