= 1866 Chilean presidential election =

Election for the president of Chile

Presidential elections were held in Chile in 1866. Carried out through a system of electors, they resulted in the election of José Joaquín Pérez as president.

== Results ==
Candidate	Party	Votes	%
José Joaquín Pérez	Liberal–Conservative	191	88.02
Manuel Bulnes	Conservative Party	15	6.91
Pedro León	Radical Party	11	5.07
Total		217	100.00
Source: Chilean Elections Database
