= 1841 Chilean presidential election =

Presidential elections were held in Chile in June and July 1841. Voters in each parish elected presidential electors between 26 June and 2 July 1841. These electors then met on 25 July to elect a president. The National Congress counted the votes on 30 August 1841, General Manuel Bulnes was elected with 94% of the votes cast.

== Background ==
Manuel Bulnes was the overwhelming favorite, with his success accredited to his decisive victory in the 1839 Battle of Yungay, for which he was widely celebrated by the ruling elite and became the consensus candidate of the Pelucones faction.

There was no organized opposition to Bulnes. The liberal Pipiolo party nominally rallied around former president Francisco Antonio Pinto, but he was nominated without his consent and asked the electors not to vote for him, stating that he would not run against his son-in-law. Pinto had returned to politics largely because his daughter, Enriqueta Pinto, was married to Bulnes.

Independence leader Bernardo O'Higgins was still living in exile in Peru at the time.

== Results ==
A total of 168 electors were expected to vote, but four were absent – three because elections had been suspended in La Serena, and one because of illness in Concepeción. A total of 164 electoral votes were cast.

Candidate	Party	Votes	%
Manuel Bulnes	Independent (Conservative)	154	93.90
Francisco Antonio Pinto	Independent (Liberal)	9	5.49
Bernardo O'Higgins	Independent	1	0.61
Total		164	100.00
Total votes		164	–
Registered voters/turnout		168	97.62
Source: Chilean Elections Database

== Aftermath ==
Bulnes was inaugurated as president later in 1841 and served until 1851. Pinto later served as a member of the Council of State and returned to political life under Bulnes' government.
