= 1942 Chilean presidential election =

- 1 February 1942
- Registered: 581,486
- Turnout: 80.23% (▼8.17pp)
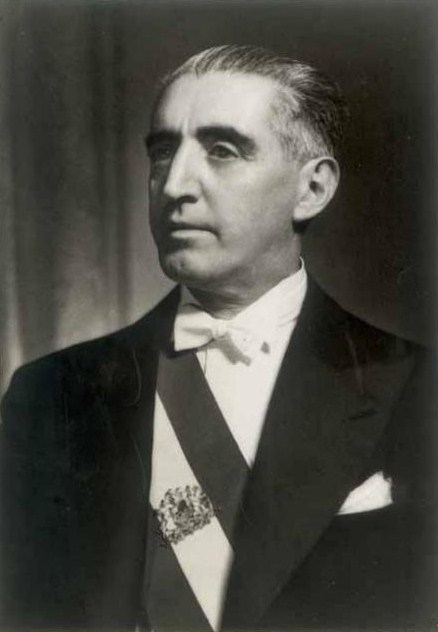

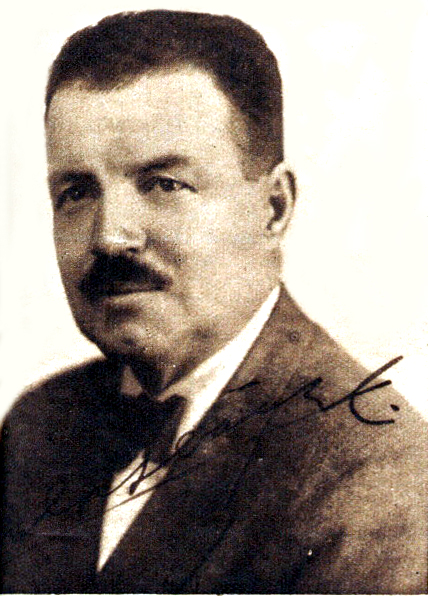
Candidate	Juan Antonio Ríos	Carlos Ibáñez del Campo
Party	Radical	Independent
Popular vote	260,034	204,635
Percentage	55.95%	44.03%
- Results by commune
President before election
Jerónimo Méndez (acting)
Radical
Elected President
Juan Antonio Ríos
Radical

Presidential elections were held in Chile on February 1, 1942. The result was a victory for Juan Antonio Ríos of the Radical Party, who received 56% of the vote.

== Electoral system ==
The election was held using the absolute majority system, under which a candidate had to receive over 50% of the popular vote to be elected. If no candidate received over 50% of the vote, both houses of the National Congress would come together to vote on the two candidates who received the most votes.

== Background ==
In 1941, due to his rapidly escalating illness, President Pedro Aguirre Cerda appointed his Minister of the Interior, Jerónimo Méndez as vice-president and died soon after, on November 25, 1941. Aguirre Cerda's two natural successors were Juan Antonio Ríos and Gabriel González Videla, both members of his Radical Party, while the right-wing coalition was united by a common candidate, former President Carlos Ibáñez del Campo, who had the support of the Conservative party, Liberal Party, National Socialist Party, Popular Socialist Vanguard and the majority of the independents.

Ríos started to campaign early but two days before the internal primaries of his party, Gabriel González Videla (the ambassador to Brazil) returned to Chile to dispute him the nomination. The results were too close to call, so a tribunal of honor (electoral commission) was constituted, and Juan Antonio Ríos was finally proclaimed the candidate of a left-wing coalition of parties, the Democratic Alliance, which was formed by the Radical Party, the Socialist Party, the Communist Party, the Democratic Party and the Workers' Socialist Party.

One of the candidates in the election was identified by American and British intelligence as an ally of the Axis countries, which led to debates in the US government about intervening in the election and abandoning Franklin D. Roosevelt's Good Neighbor policy.

== Results ==
Candidate	Party	Votes	%
Juan Antonio Ríos	Radical Party	260,034	55.95
Carlos Ibáñez del Campo	Independent	204,635	44.03
Other candidates		124	0.03
Total		464,793	100.00
Valid votes		464,793	99.63
Invalid/blank votes		1,714	0.37
Total votes		466,507	100.00
Registered voters/turnout		581,486	80.23
Source: Nohlen
