= October 1891 Chilean presidential election =

- 18 October 1891
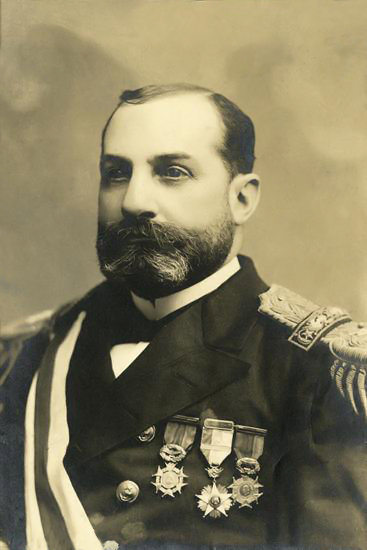
Candidate	Jorge Montt
Party	Liberal–Radical–Conservative
Electoral vote	255
President before election
Claudio Vicuña Guerrero
Liberal Party
President
Jorge Montt
Liberal–Radical–Conservative

Presidential elections were held in Chile on 18 October 1891. Carried out through a system of electors, they resulted in the election of Jorge Montt (the sole candidate) as President.

== Results ==
Candidate	Party	Votes	%
Jorge Montt	Liberal–Radical–Conservative	255	100.00
Total		255	100.00
Source: Chilean Elections Database
