= 1861 Chilean presidential election =

Presidential elections were held in Chile in 1861. Carried out through a system of electors, they resulted in the election of José Joaquín Pérez as president.

Pérez was a "unity" candidate between the conservatives and liberals. He won the election unanimously.

== Results ==
Candidate	Party	Votes	%
José Joaquín Pérez	Conservative–Liberal–National	214	100.00
Total		214	100.00
Total votes		214	–
Registered voters/turnout		216	99.07
Source: Chilean Elections Database
