= 1958 Chilean presidential election =

- 4 September 1958
- Registered: 1,497,493
- Turnout: 83.50% (▼3.11pp)
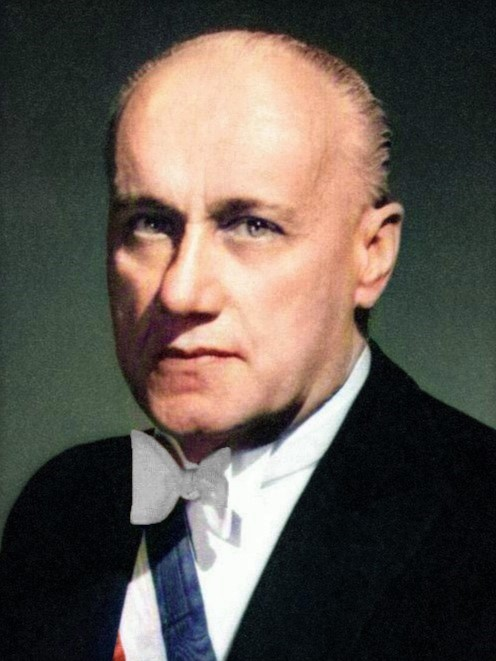

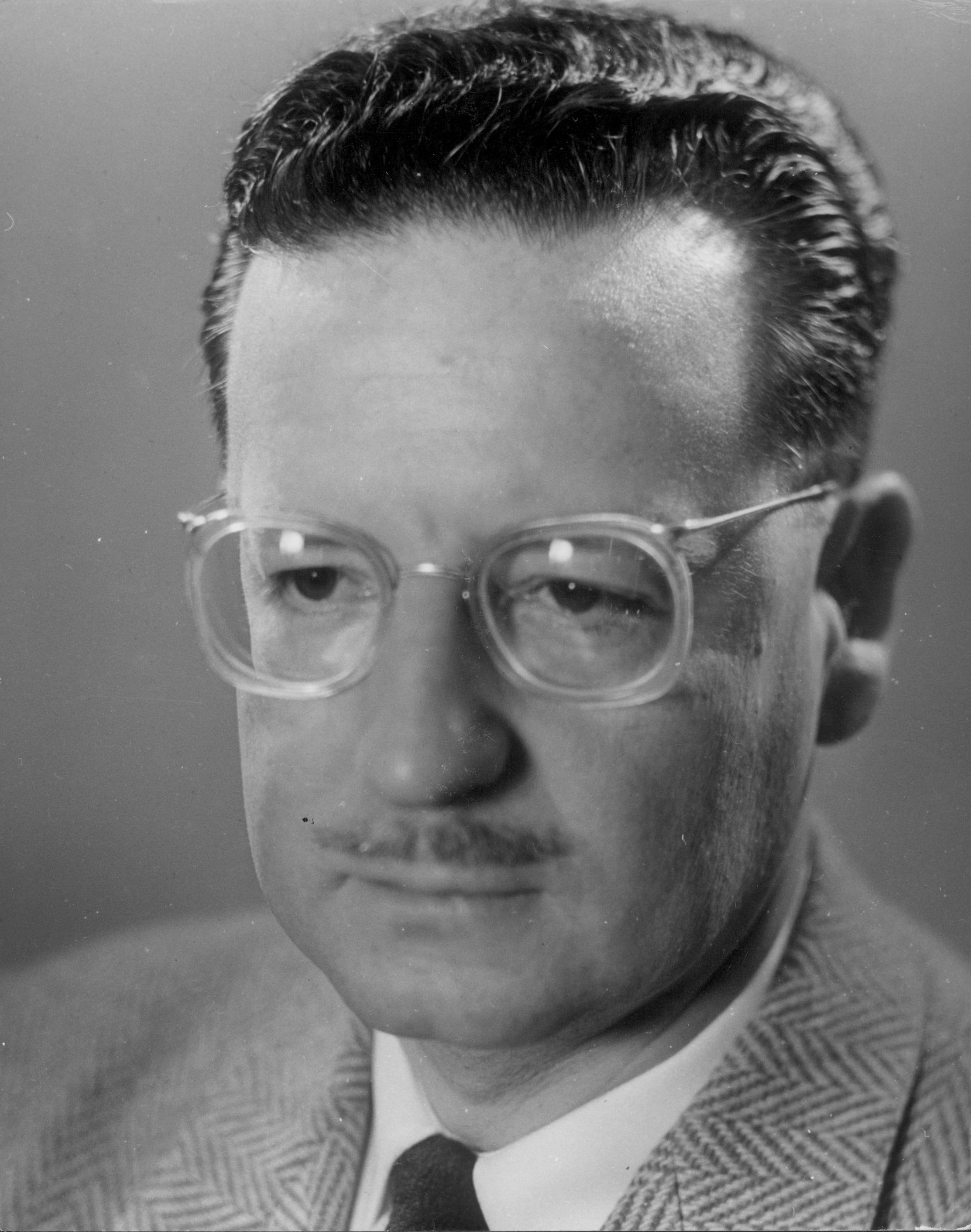

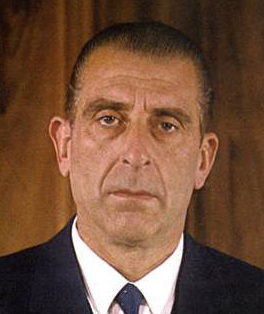

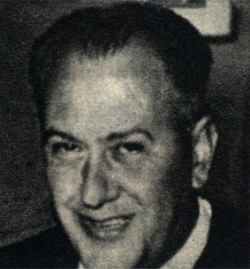
Candidate	Jorge Alessandri	Salvador Allende
Party	Independent	Socialist
Alliance	Liberal–Conservative	FRAP
Popular vote	389,909	356,493
Percentage	31.56%	28.85%
Congress vote	147	26
Candidate	Eduardo Frei Montalva	Luis Bossay
Party	PDC	Radical
Popular vote	255,769	192,077
Percentage	20.70%	15.55%
President before election
Carlos Ibáñez del Campo
Independent
Elected President
Jorge Alessandri
Independent

Presidential elections were held in Chile on 4 September 1958. The result was a victory for Jorge Alessandri, who ran as an independent. Allende's defeat has been commonly attributed to Antonio Zamorano, also known as "Cura de Catapilco", entering the race as a populist left-wing candidate and taking votes from Allende's electorate. This explanation has been questioned by modern research that infers Zamorano took votes from across the political spectrum. The "Catapilco" effect remains a trope in Chilean electoral discourse used to indicate a candidate that finishes third and is believed to have hindered the runner-up.

== Electoral system ==
The election was held using the absolute majority system, under which a candidate had to receive over 50% of the popular vote to be elected. If no candidate received over 50% of the vote, both houses of the National Congress would come together to vote on the two candidates that received the most votes.

== Results ==
Candidate	Party	Popular vote		Congress vote	
Candidate	Party	Votes	%	Votes	%
Jorge Alessandri	Independent (Liberal–Conservative)	389,909	31.56	147	84.97
Salvador Allende	Socialist Party	356,493	28.85	26	15.03
Eduardo Frei Montalva	Christian Democratic Party	255,769	20.70		
Luis Bossay	Radical Party	192,077	15.55		
Antonio Zamorano	Independent	41,304	3.34		
Total		1,235,552	100.00	173	100.00
Valid votes		1,235,552	98.82	173	92.51
Invalid/blank votes		14,798	1.18	14	7.49
Total votes		1,250,350	100.00	187	100.00
Registered voters/turnout		1,497,493	83.50	192	97.40
Source: Nohlen, Chilean Electoral Database
