= 1846 Chilean presidential election =

Presidential elections were held in Chile in 1846. General Manuel Bulnes was the only candidate and elected unopposed.

== Results ==
Candidate	Party	Votes	%
Manuel Bulnes	Independent (Conservative)	161	100.00
Total		161	100.00
Total votes		161	–
Registered voters/turnout		164	98.17
Source: Chilean Elections Database
