= Javier Figueroa =

Chilean lawyer and politician

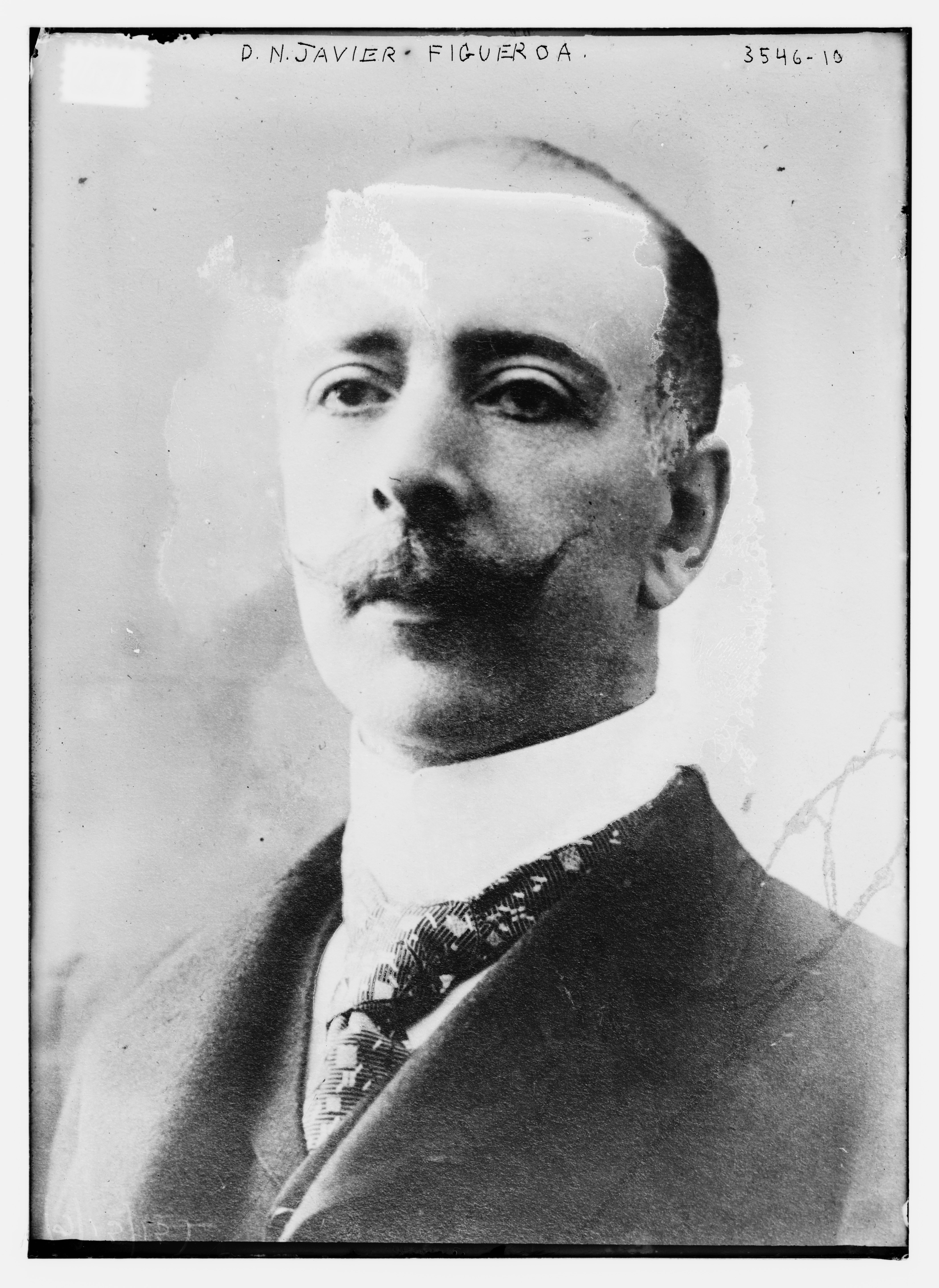
Javier Ángel Figueroa Larraín

Javier Ángel Figueroa Larraín (January 17, 1862 – June 26, 1945) was a Chilean lawyer, politician and older brother of former President Emiliano Figueroa Larraín.

He was sworn in as a lawyer in 1882 and then married Agnes Cañas Arrieta. They had five children together.

He ran in the presidential election of 1915, but was narrowly defeated by Juan Luis Sanfuentes. He became a member of the Chilean Supreme Court in 1920, but was removed by Carlos Ibáñez del Campo during a power struggle between Ibáñez and Figueroa's brother, the president.
