= 1938 Chilean presidential election =

- 25 October 1938
- Registered: 503,871
- Turnout: 88.40% (▲14.00pp)
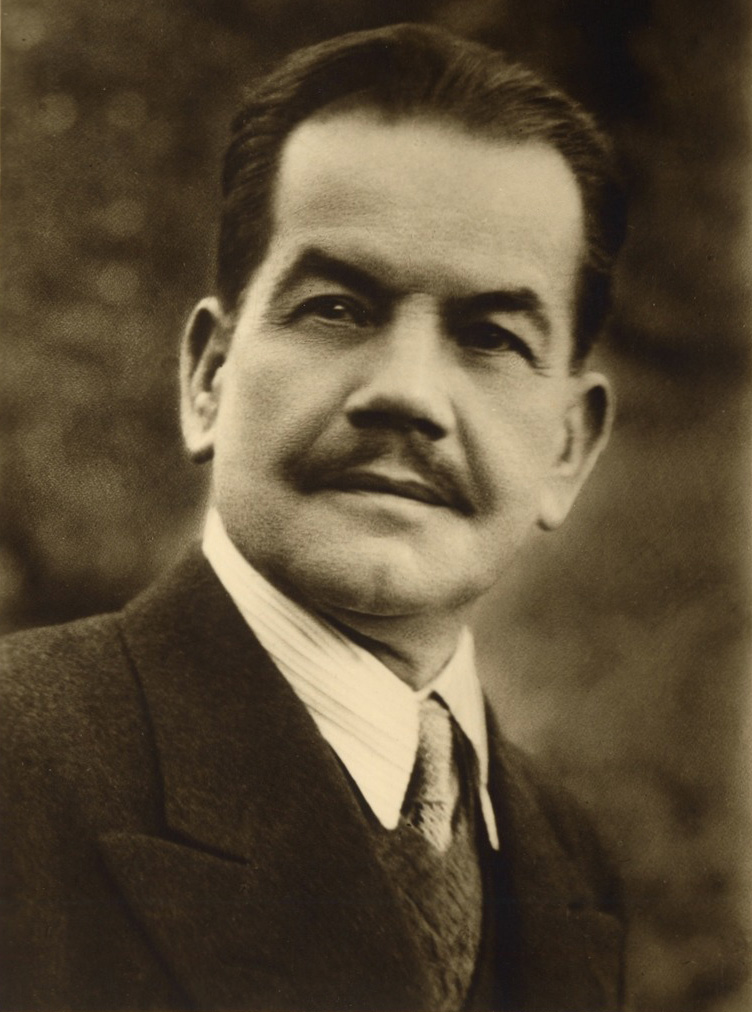

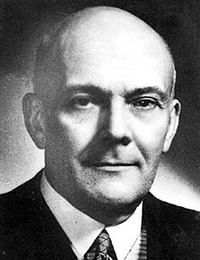
Candidate	Pedro Aguirre Cerda	Gustavo Ross
Party	Radical	Liberal
Alliance	Popular Front	Right-wing
Popular vote	222,720	218,609
Percentage	50.45%	49.52%
- Results by commune
President before election
Arturo Alessandri
Liberal
Elected President
Pedro Aguirre Cerda
Radical

Presidential elections were held in Chile on 25 October 1938. The result was a narrow victory for Pedro Aguirre Cerda of the Radical Party, who received 50.5% (or 50.3%) of the vote.

== Electoral system ==
The election was held using the absolute majority system, under which a candidate had to receive over 50% of the popular vote to be elected. If no candidate received over 50% of the vote, both houses of the National Congress would come together to vote on the two candidates that received the most votes.

== Results ==
Candidate	Party	Votes	%
Pedro Aguirre Cerda	Radical Party	222,720	50.45
Gustavo Ross	Liberal Party	218,609	49.52
Carlos Ibáñez del Campo	Popular Freedom Alliance	112	0.03
Total		441,441	100.00
Valid votes		441,441	99.11
Invalid/blank votes		3,970	0.89
Total votes		445,411	100.00
Registered voters/turnout		503,871	88.40
Source: Nohlen
