= Vicente Reyes (politician) =

Chilean lawyer, journalist and political figure

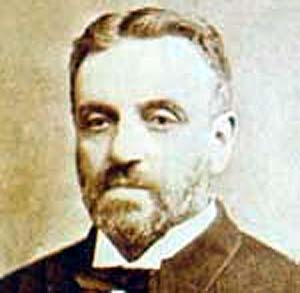
Vicente Reyes

Pedro Vicente Reyes Palazuelos (b. 1835 - July 6, 1918), was a Chilean lawyer, journalist, political figure, and candidate during the 1896 presidential election.

Vicente Reyes was born in Santiago, the son of Manuel Reyes Saravia and of Mercedes Palazuelos Astaburiaga. He completed his studies in the Instituto Nacional and at the Universidad de Chile, where he graduated as a lawyer in 1858 with a thesis about the copyright of literary works. By 1856 he was already well known in the literary circles of the time and as a journalist of the El Ferrocarril newspaper and the La Semana magazine. In 1857 he joined the civil service as section chief at the Ministry of the Interior and later at the Ministry of Public Instruction, where he remained until 1861, when he was elected as alternate deputy for Ovalle for the period 1861–1864. He also became a professor at the School of Law of the Universidad de Chile and was one of the original members of the Chilean Academy of Language.

On June 15, 1863 he married Luisa Solar Valdés and together they had 10 children. In 1869 he was elected president of the Club de la Reforma, the historical nucleus of the Liberal party. He was elected deputy (this time representing Talca) for the period 1870-1873 and reelected to congress as a deputy for Valparaíso for the period 1876-1879 and 1879–1882. President Aníbal Pinto designed him Minister of the Interior, a position he held from October 27, 1877 to August 5, 1878.

In 1885, he was elected Senator for Coquimbo for the period 1885–1891; and was one of the principal supporters of the presidential bid of José Francisco Vergara, who went on to lose the party nomination to José Manuel Balmaceda. On June 5, 1889 was elected President of the Senate; position he resigned shortly after and was one of the few senators who refused to sign the Act of Destitution of President Balmaceda; and did not participate in the 1891 Chilean Civil War. In 1894, President Jorge Montt asked him to head a coalition cabinet, but he refused.

Reyes was reelected a Senator (for Santiago this time) for the period 1891–1897, was elected President of the Senate on April 26, 1895 and again on August 25, 1909. For the 1896 presidential election, the Liberal party named him their candidate. He lost to Federico Errázuriz Echaurren by only two electoral votes. He was reelected a Senator for the periods 1897–1903, 1903–1909, 1909–1915 and 1915–1921, but died in Santiago before completing his last period, of Bronchopneumonia at the age of 83 in 1918.

Political offices
Preceded by José Victorino Lastarria	Minister of the Interior; 1877-1878	Succeeded by Belisario Prats
Preceded by Agustín Edwards Ross	President of the Senate of Chile; 1895-1896	Succeeded by Ramón Barros Luco
Preceded by José Elías Balmaceda	President of the Senate of Chile; 1909	Succeeded by Ismael Valdés
