= 1881 Chilean presidential election =

- 1881
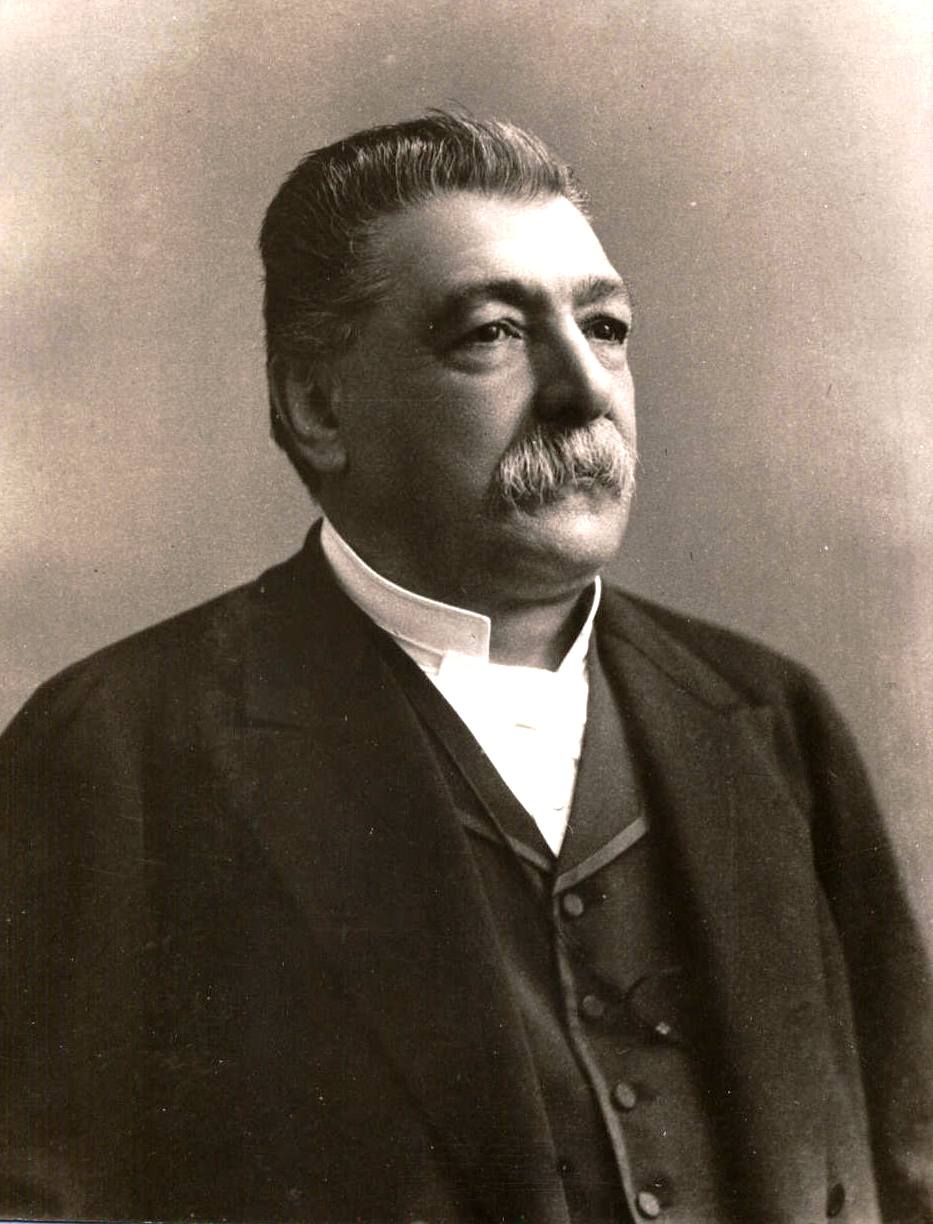

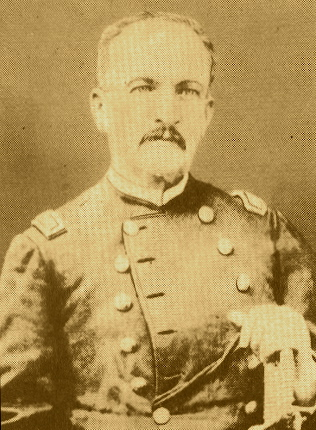
Candidate	Domingo Santa María	Manuel Baquedano
Party	Liberal–Radical	Conservative–Liberal
Electoral vote	255	12
Percentage	95.51%	4.49%
President before election
Aníbal Pinto
National–Liberal
Elected President
Domingo Santa María
Liberal–Radical

Presidential elections were held in Chile in 1881, during the War of the Pacific. Carried out through a system of electors, they resulted in the election of Domingo Santa María as president. The election was not free and fair, and occurred in the context of election violence. Santa María was the sole candidate after Manuel Baquedano's resignation. Santa María had been hand-picked by incumbent President Pinto. However, Baquedano received 12 electoral votes in Santiago.

== Results ==
Candidate	Party	Votes	%
Domingo Santa María	Liberal Alliance (PL–PR)	255	95.51
Manuel Baquedano	Conservative–Liberal	12	4.49
Total		267	100.00
Valid votes		267	87.54
Invalid/blank votes		38	12.46
Total votes		305	100.00
Source: Chilean Elections Database
