= 1915 Chilean presidential election =

- 25 June 1915
- Turnout: 81.28% ▲28 pp
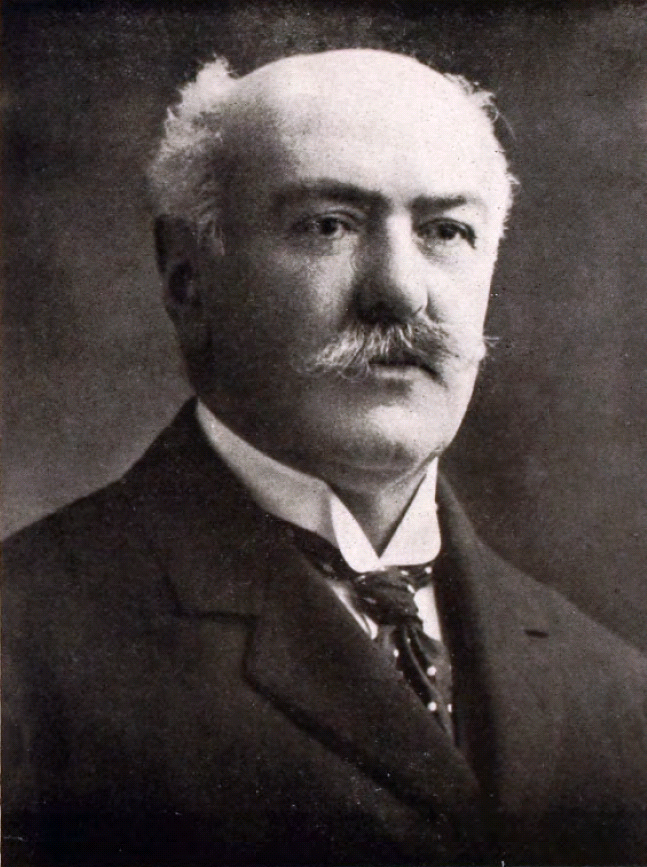

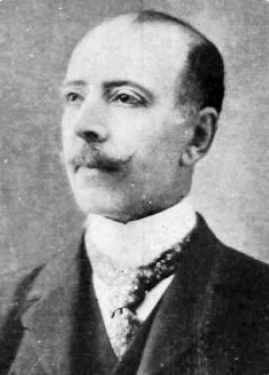
Candidate	Juan Luis Sanfuentes	Javier Ángel Figueroa
Party	Liberal Democratic	Liberal
Alliance	Coalition	Liberal Alliance
Electoral vote	174	173
Congress vote	77	41
President before election
Ramón Barros Luco
Liberal
Elected President
Juan Luis Sanfuentes
Liberal Democratic

Presidential elections were held in Chile in 1915. They were a bitter contest between Juan Luis Sanfuentes – a Coalition candidate of the Liberal Party and Conservative Party – and Javier Ángel Figueroa – supported by the Liberal Alliance parties. Sanfuentes beat Figueroa by a single vote in the electoral vote, with numerous allegations of fraud and electoral intervention. Due to the controversy, the National Congress made a contingent vote, which Sanfuentes won by 77 votes to 41.

== Results ==
Candidate	Party	Electoral vote		Congress vote	
Candidate	Party	Votes	%	Votes	%
Juan Luis Sanfuentes	Coalition	174	50.14	77	65.25
Javier Ángel Figueroa	Liberal Alliance	173	49.86	41	34.75
Total		347	100.00	118	100.00
Source: Chilean Elections Database
