= 1906 Chilean presidential election =

- 25 June 1906
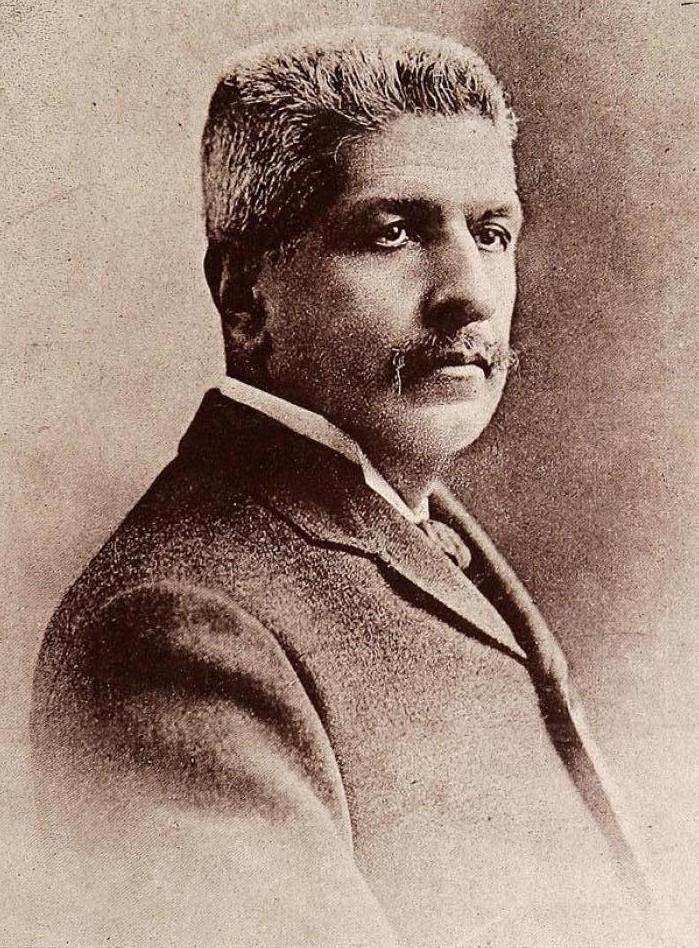

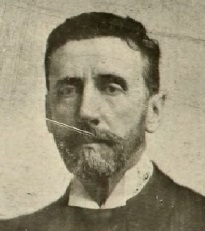
Candidate	Pedro Montt	Fernando Lazcano Echaurren
Party	National Party	Liberal Party
Alliance	Liberal Union	Coalition
Electoral vote	164	97
Percentage	62.60%	37.02%
President before election
Germán Riesco
Liberal Party
President
Pedro Montt
National Party

Presidential elections were held in Chile in 1906. Conducted through a system of electors, they resulted in the election of Pedro Montt as President.

== Results ==
Candidate	Party	Votes	%
Pedro Montt	Liberal Alliance	164	62.60
Fernando Lazcano Echaurren	Coalition	97	37.02
Zenón Torrealba	Democrat Party	1	0.38
Total		262	100.00
Source: Chilean Elections Database
