= Joaquín Vicuña =

Vice President of Chile

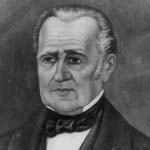
José Joaquín Vicuña

José Joaquín Vicuña Larraín (Spanish pronunciation: [xoˈse xo.aˈkim biˈkuɲa laraˈin]; 1786–1857) was a Chilean politician whose selection as Vice President of Chile by Congress precipitated the Chilean Civil War of 1829. He was of Basque descent.

Vicuña was from a powerful family; of his brothers, Francisco Ramón Vicuña was an influential politician, and Manuel Vicuña was Archbishop of Santiago. He is primarily known for his role in the presidential election of 1829. He ran for president, finishing fourth; but rather than appointing the runner-up (or even second runner-up) as vice president, the Congress controlled by his brother's party appointed Joaquín, precipitating a civil war.

He founded the town of Vicuña in 1821.
