= 1831 Chilean presidential election =

Presidential elections were held in Chile on 5 April 1831. Carried out through a system of electors, they resulted in the election of General Joaquín Prieto as president.

== Background ==
Following the victory by the conservatives at the Battle of Lircay, which put an end to the Chilean Civil War of 1829–30, order was restored. A new Congress was elected, and a call for presidential elections was made. A restricted number of citizens voted for electors, who in turn voted to elect a new president.

On June 2, the day following the first session of the new Congress, the vote recount took place. Joaquín Prieto was elected president, and Diego Portales vice president. The position of Vice President was later abolished with the Constitution of 1833.

== Results ==
Candidate	Votes	%
Joaquín Prieto	207	50.00
Diego Portales	186	44.93
Francisco Ruiz-Tagle	18	4.35
Ambrosio Aldunate	2	0.48
Fernando Errázuriz Aldunate	1	0.24
Total	414	100.00
Source: Chilean Elections Database
