= 1886 Chilean presidential election =

- 1886
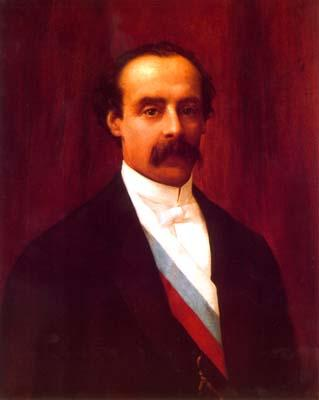

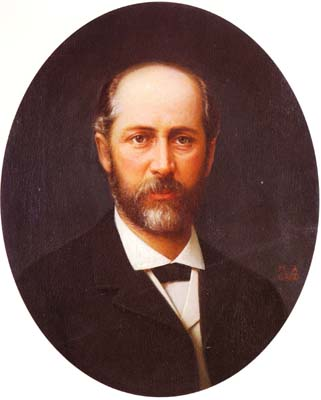
Candidate	José Manuel Balmaceda	José Francisco Vergara
Party	Liberal Party	Radical–National
Electoral vote	324	6
Percentage	98.18%	1.82
President before election
Domingo Santa María
Liberal Alliance (PL–PR)
Elected President
José Manuel Balmaceda
Liberal Party

Presidential elections were held in Chile in 1886. Carried out through a system of electors, they resulted in the election of José Manuel Balmaceda as president.

The election was not free and fair. The opposition candidate Vergara withdrew his candidacy before the final votes were counted.

== Results ==
Electoral college results.

Candidate	Party	Votes	%
José Manuel Balmaceda	Liberal Party	324	98.18
José Francisco Vergara	Radical–National	6	1.82
Total		330	100.00
Source: Chilean Elections Database
