= 1876 Chilean presidential election =

Election for the president of Chile

- 1876
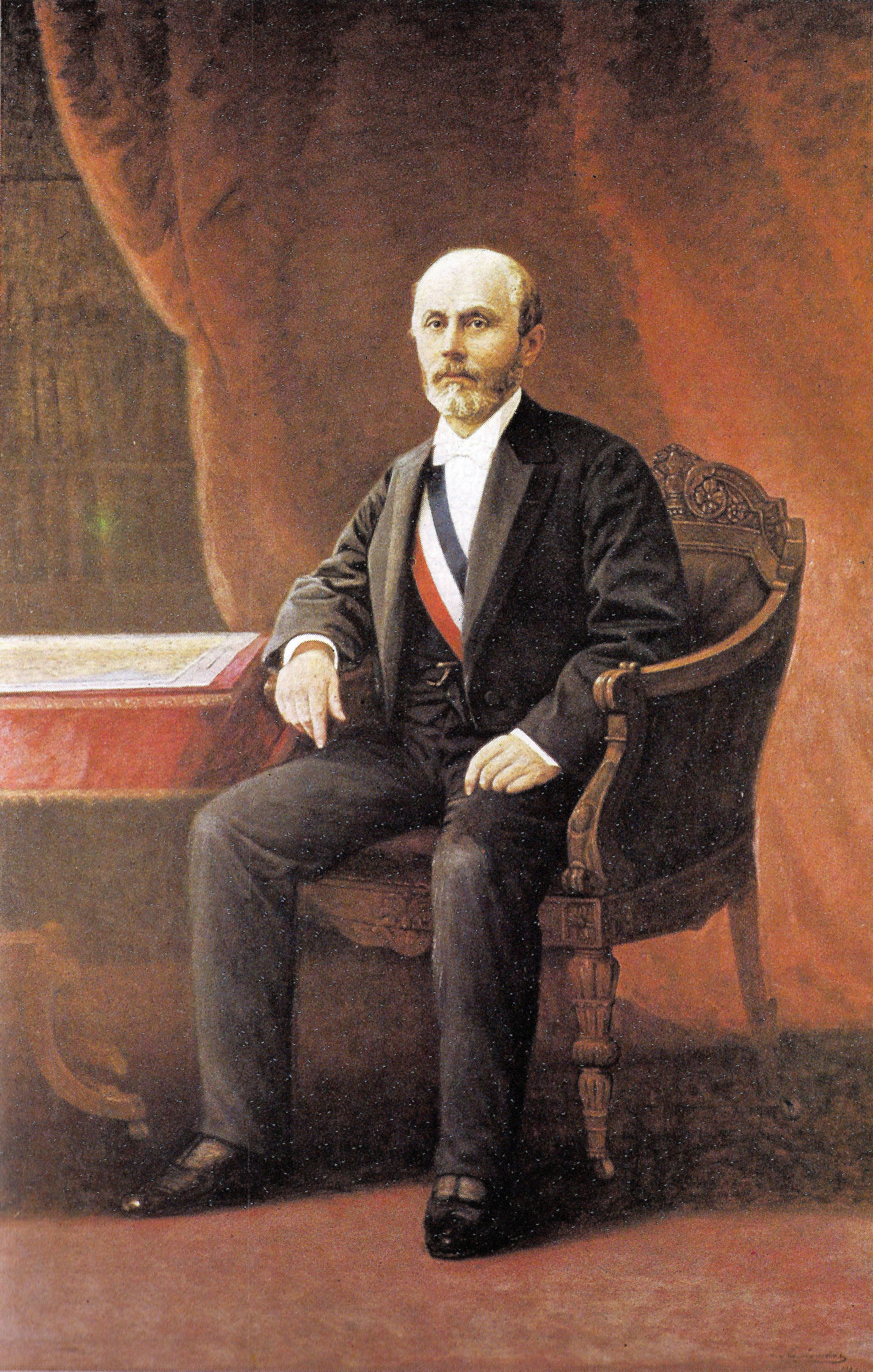
Candidate	Aníbal Pinto
Party	National–Liberal
Electoral vote	293
Popular vote	45114
Percentage	100%
President before election
Federico Errázuriz Zañartu
Liberal–Conservative
Elected President
Aníbal Pinto
National–Liberal

Presidential elections were held in Chile in 1876. Carried out through a system of electors, they resulted in the election of Aníbal Pinto (the sole candidate) as President.

== Results ==
Candidate	Party	Popular vote		Electoral vote	
Candidate	Party	Votes	%	Votes	%
Aníbal Pinto	National–Liberal	45,114	100.00	293	100.00
Total		45,114	100.00	293	100.00
Total votes		45,114	–	293	–
Registered voters/turnout		106,194	42.48	307	95.44
Source: Chilean Elections Database
