= 1901 Chilean presidential election =

- 25 June 1901
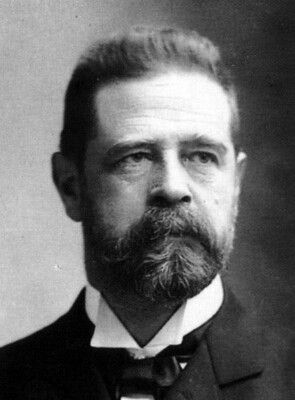

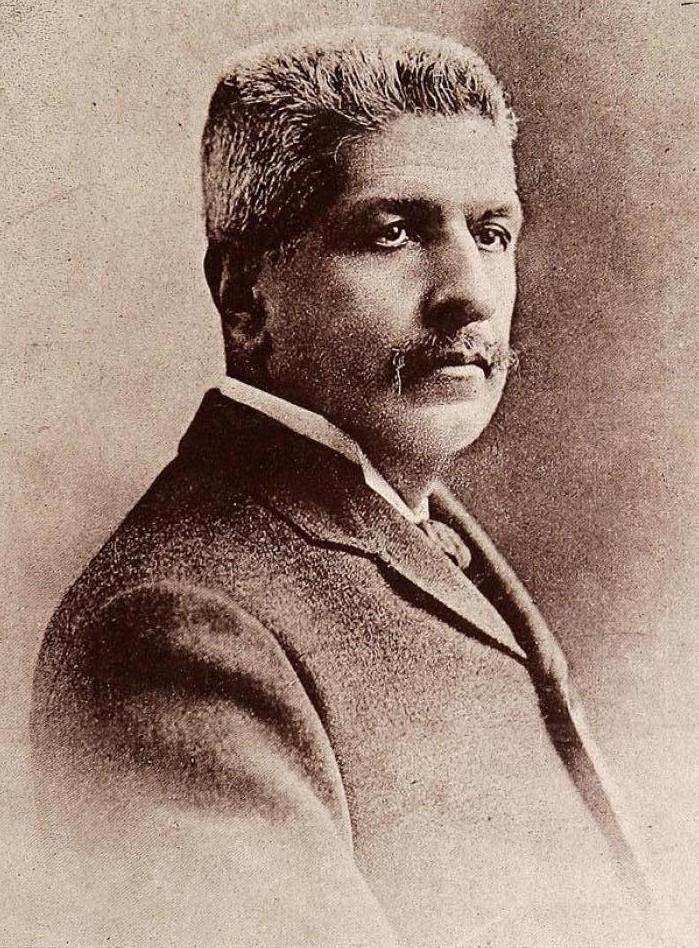
| Candidate | Germán Riesco | Pedro Montt |
| Party | Liberal Party | National Party |
| Alliance | Liberal Alliance | Coalition |
| Electoral vote | 184 | 83 |
| Percentage | 68.91% | 31.09% |
President before election
Aníbal Zañartu
Liberal Party
President
Germán Riesco
Liberal Party

Presidential elections were held in Chile in 1901. Conducted through a system of electors, they resulted in the election of Germán Riesco as President.

The election of the electors took place on 25 June 1901 and the indirect election of the president took place on 25 July 1901.

== Results ==
| Candidate | Party | Votes | % |
|---|---|---|---|
| Germán Riesco | Liberal Alliance | 184 | 68.91 |
| Pedro Montt | Coalition | 83 | 31.09 |
| Total | | 267 | 100.00 |
| Total votes | | 267 | – |
| Registered voters/turnout | | 279 | 95.70 |
Source: Chilean Elections Database
