= 1910 Chilean presidential election =

- 15 October 1910
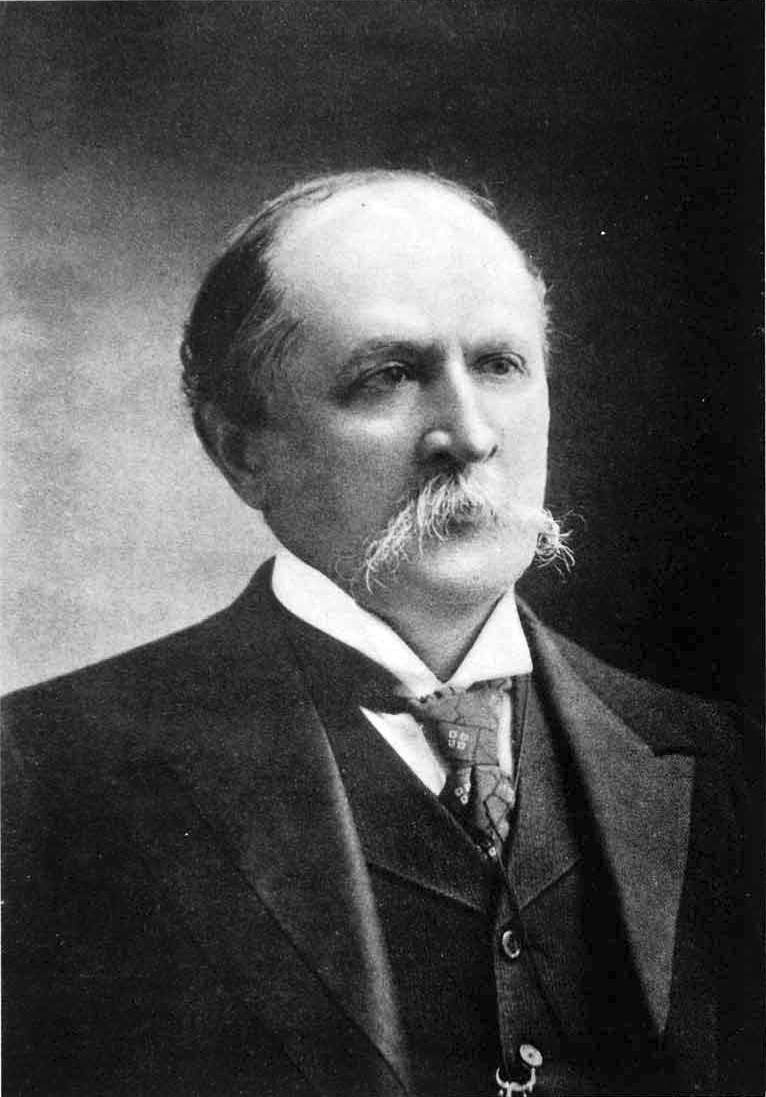
Nominee	Ramón Barros Luco
Party	Liberal Party
Alliance	Coalition–Liberal Alliance
Electoral vote	268
Popular vote	263,148
Percentage	100%
President before election
Emiliano Figueroa
Liberal Democratic
President
Ramón Barros Luco
Liberal Party

Presidential elections were held in Chile in 1910, following the death of President Pedro Montt on August 16 that year and the death of his successor, Vice President Elías Fernández Albano, less than a month later.

Fernández's vice president Emiliano Figueroa called new presidential elections. Political parties agreed on presenting a single candidate – Ramón Barros – as a symbol of unity in celebration of Chile's first centenary of independence.

== Results ==
Candidate	Party	Votes	%
Ramón Barros Luco	Liberal Alliance–Coalition	268	100.00
Total		268	100.00
Source: Chilean Elections Database
