= 1856 Chilean presidential election =

Indirect presidential elections were held in Chile on 25 July 1856. Incumbent President Manuel Montt was re-elected by a system of electors

== Results ==
Candidate	Party	Votes	%
Manuel Montt	Independent (Conservative)	207	99.04
José Santiago Aldunate	Conservative Party	2	0.96
Total		209	100.00
Source: Chilean Elections Database
