= 1829 Chilean presidential election =

- 16–17 September 1829

216 members of the Electoral College 109 electoral votes votes needed to win
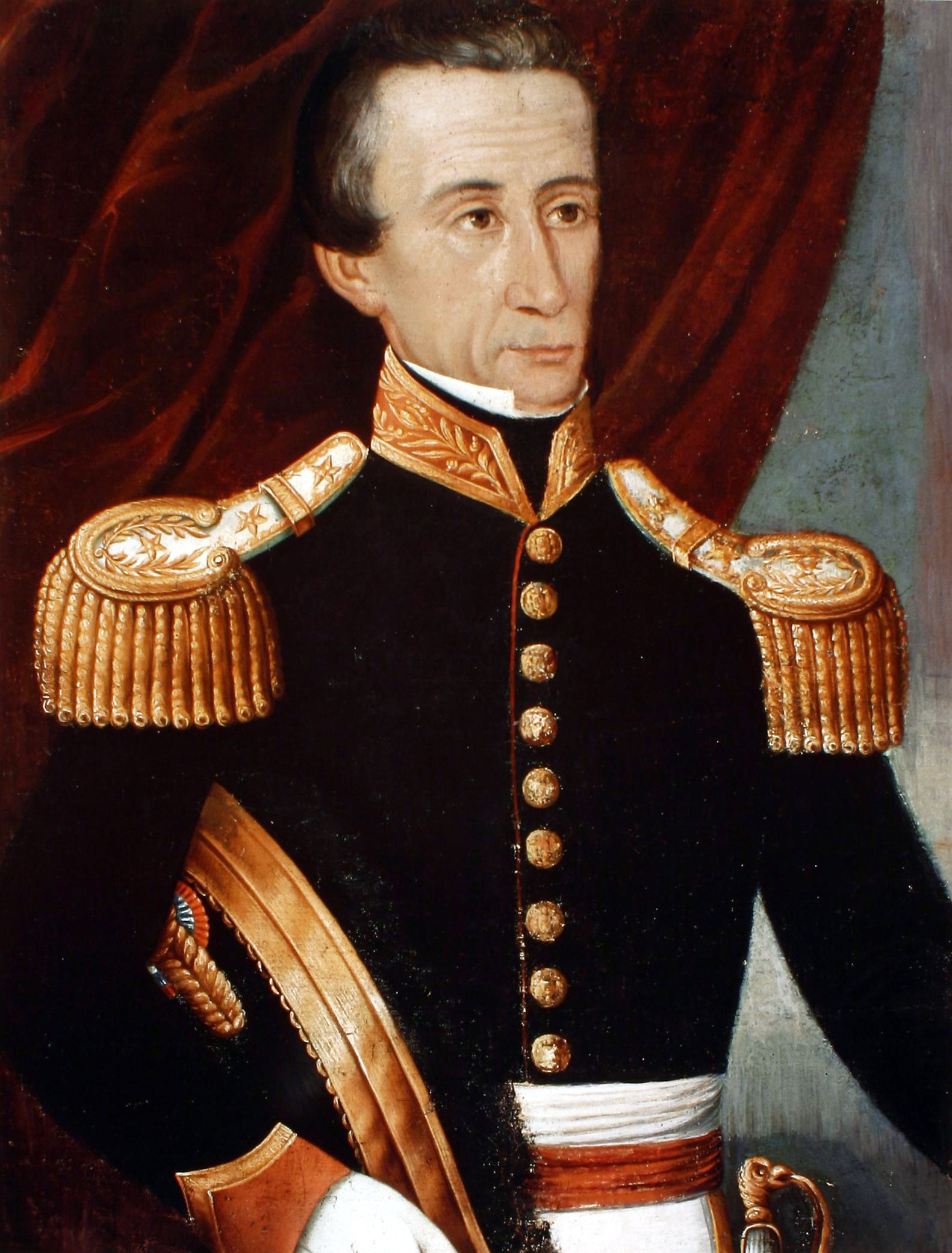

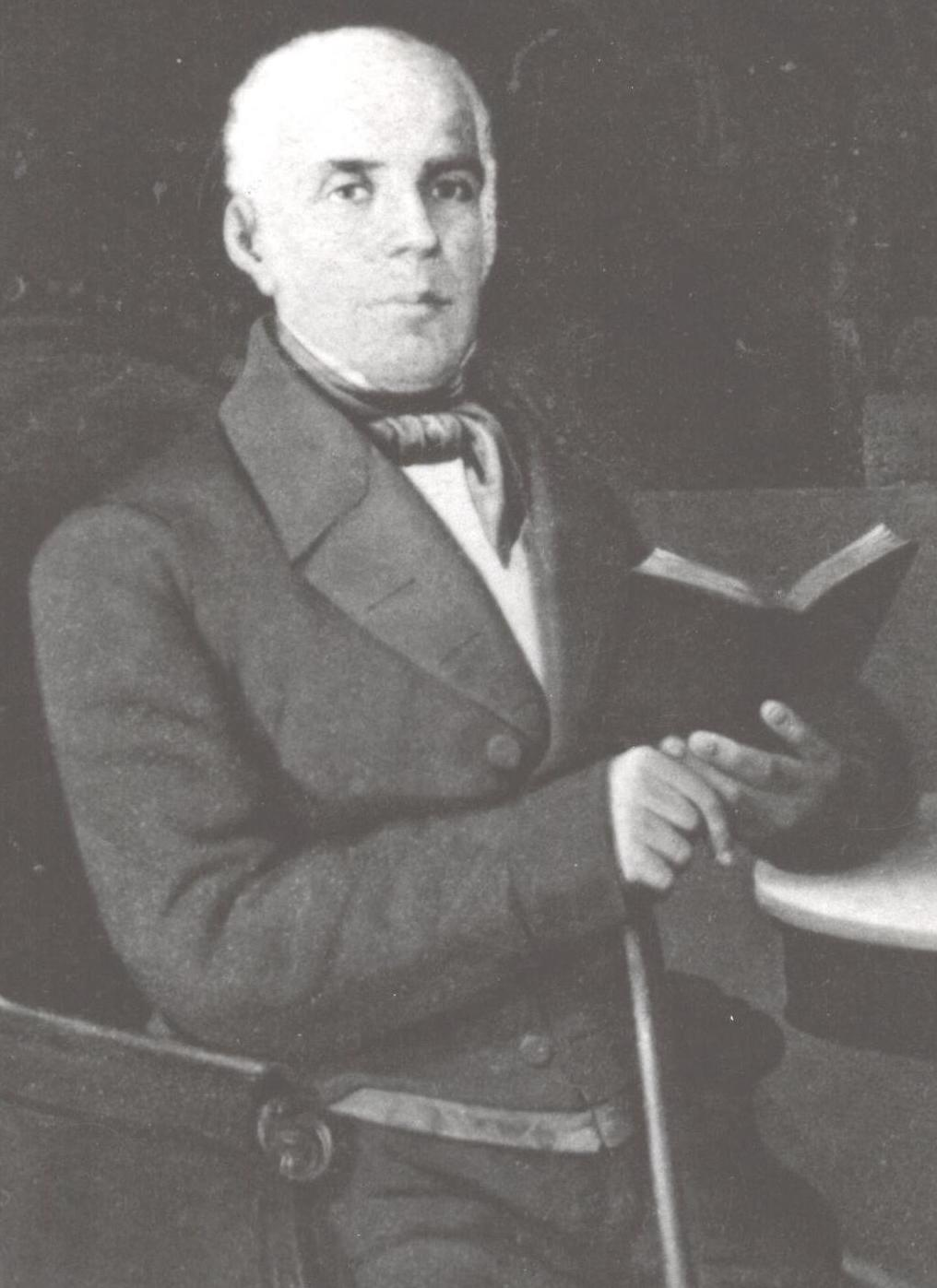

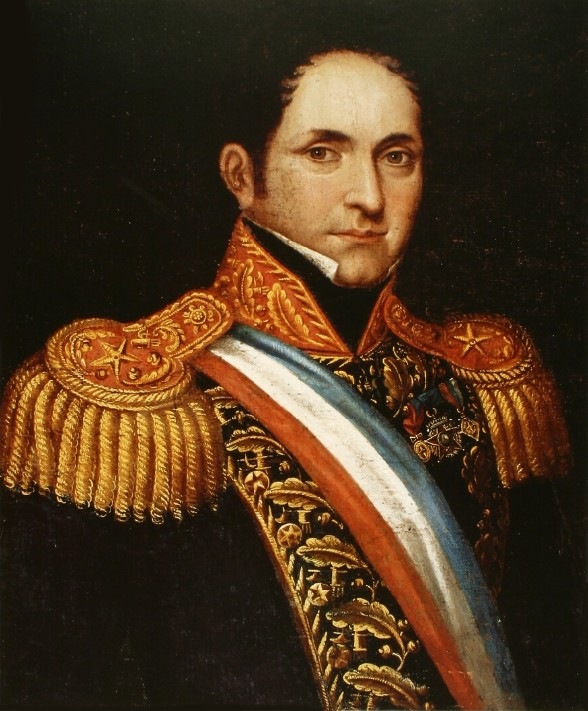

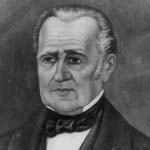
| Nominee | Francisco Antonio Pinto | Francisco Ruiz-Tagle |
| Electoral vote | 122 | 98 |
| Nominee | Joaquín Prieto | Joaquín Vicuña |
| Electoral vote | 61 | 48 |
Acting President before election
Francisco Ramón Vicuña
Elected President
Francisco Antonio Pinto

Presidential elections were held in Chile on September 16 and 17, 1829, through a system of electors.

== Background ==
The newly enacted Constitution of 1828 provided that the President was to be chosen by electors. Two hundred and sixteen electors, three for each congressman, were to be chosen. Each elector voted for two names, without specifying which vote was for President or Vice President.

The election was subject to abuses, so electors gave their vote to Francisco Antonio Pinto and to Joaquín Vicuña.

Even though Pinto was accepted as president, his resignation and replacement by Vice President Joaquín Vicuña triggered the Chilean Civil War of 1829.

== Results ==
| Candidate | Votes | % |
|---|---|---|
| Francisco Antonio Pinto | 122 | 29.61 |
| Francisco Ruiz-Tagle | 98 | 23.79 |
| José Joaquín Prieto | 61 | 14.81 |
| Joaquín Vicuña | 48 | 11.65 |
| José Gregorio Argomedo | 33 | 8.01 |
| Juan de Dios Rivera y Freire de Andrade | 13 | 3.16 |
| José Miguel Infante | 8 | 1.94 |
| José María Benavente | 7 | 1.70 |
| Bernardo del Solar Marín | 6 | 1.46 |
| Juan Esteban Manzano de la Sotta | 3 | 0.73 |
| Gregorio Cordovez | 3 | 0.73 |
| Manuel Bulnes | 2 | 0.49 |
| José Ánjel Jiménez | 1 | 0.24 |
| Sebastian Villalobos | 1 | 0.24 |
| Bernardo O'Higgins | 1 | 0.24 |
| Félix Antonio Novoa | 1 | 0.24 |
| Lucas Grez | 1 | 0.24 |
| Mariano Peñafiel | 1 | 0.24 |
| Pedro Rios | 1 | 0.24 |
| Francisco Merino | 1 | 0.24 |
| Total | 412 | 100.00 |
Source: Letelier
