= 1927 Chilean presidential election =

- 22 May 1927
- Registered: 328,700
- Turnout: 70.39% (▼15.96pp)
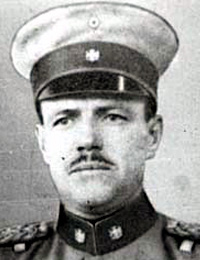

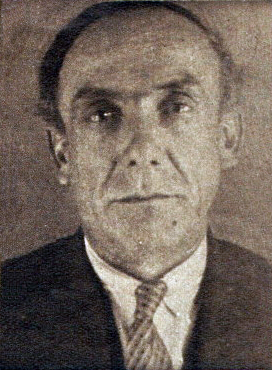
Nominee	Carlos Ibáñez del Campo	Elías Lafertte
Party	Independent	Communist
Popular vote	223,741	4,627
Percentage	97.97%	2.03%
President before election
Carlos Ibáñez (acting)
Independent
Elected President
Carlos Ibáñez
Independent

Presidential elections were held in Chile on 22 May 1927, following the resignation of President Emiliano Figueroa. The result was a victory for Interior Minister Carlos Ibáñez del Campo, who ran as an independent and received 98% of the vote.

Ibáñez's only opponent was the communist Elías Lafertte, who was exiled in the Juan Fernández Archipelago throughout the electoral campaign.

== Electoral system ==
The election was held using the absolute majority system, under which a candidate had to receive over 50% of the popular vote to be elected. If no candidate received over 50% of the vote, both houses of the National Congress would come together to vote on the two candidates who received the most votes.

== Results ==
Candidate	Party	Votes	%
Carlos Ibáñez del Campo	Independent	223,741	97.97
Elías Lafertte	Communist Party	4,627	2.03
Total		228,368	100.00
Valid votes		228,368	98.70
Invalid/blank votes		3,004	1.30
Total votes		231,372	100.00
Registered voters/turnout		328,700	70.39
Source: Nohlen, Chilean Electoral Database
