= 1836 Chilean presidential election =

- March 31, 1836

165 members of the Electoral College at least 83 electoral votes needed to win
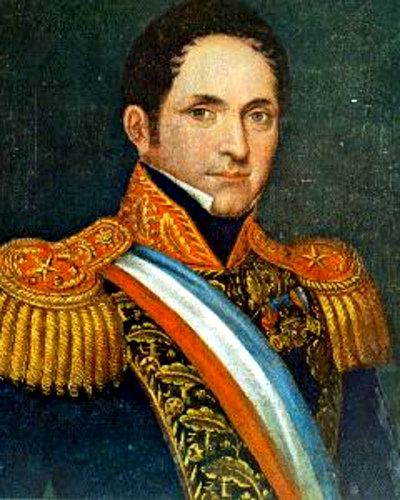

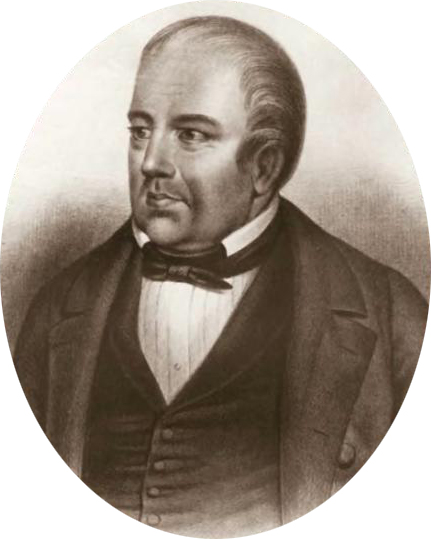
Nominee	Joaquín Prieto	José Miguel Infante
Electoral vote	143	11
- Presidential election results map. Blue denotes states won by Prieto, green denotes those won by Infante, red those won by Borgoño and light blue those won by Portales. Numbers indicate electoral votes cast by each province.
President before election
Joaquín Prieto
Conservative
Elected President
Joaquín Prieto
Conservative

Presidential elections were held in Chile in 1836. Carried out through a system of electors, they resulted in the re-election of incumbent president Joaquín Prieto.

Prieto faced little opposition in this election and was easily re-elected. Manuel Rengifo considered running in the election as a candidate for moderates.

== Results ==
Candidate	Votes	%
Joaquín Prieto	143	91.08
José Miguel Infante	11	7.01
José Manuel Borgoño	2	1.27
Diego Portales	1	0.64
Total	157	100.00
Source: Chilean Elections Database
