= Pipiolos =

Term for liberal aristocrats in early 19th-century Chile

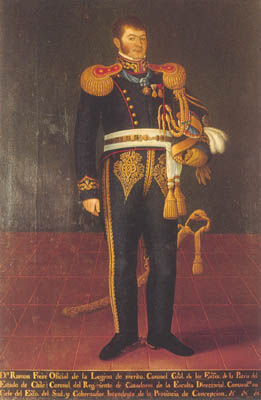
Ramón Freire, hero of the Chilean War of Independence and head of state between 1823 and 1826 and again in 1827, was an icon of the Pipiolo movement

Pipiolos (Spanish for a young or naive person) was a name used to refer to Chilean upper class liberals in the early 19th century. The name "pipiolo" was originally used by the conservative Pelucones in a derogatory manner by associating the liberals to inexperience. In the Chilean Civil War of 1829 the Pipiolos, led by Ramón Freire, were defeated, which made it so the Pelucones could enforce the Chilean Constitution of 1833, which led to creation of a strong unitarian and authoritarian presidential system held up by upper-class democracy.

During the Revolution of 1851, the Pipiolos made a failed attempt to seize power from conservatives. With the Liberal–Conservative Fusion in 1858, the term "Pipiolo" fell into disuse.

== Historical leaders ==
- Ramón Freire
- Francisco Antonio Pinto
- Jorge Beauchef
- Francisco de la Lastra
- José Manuel Borgoño
- Guillermo Tupper
- José Rondizzoni
- Enrique Castro
- Francisco Ramón Vicuña
