= Ministry of Foreign Affairs (Chile) =

Government ministry of Chile

- Ministerio de Relaciones Exteriores
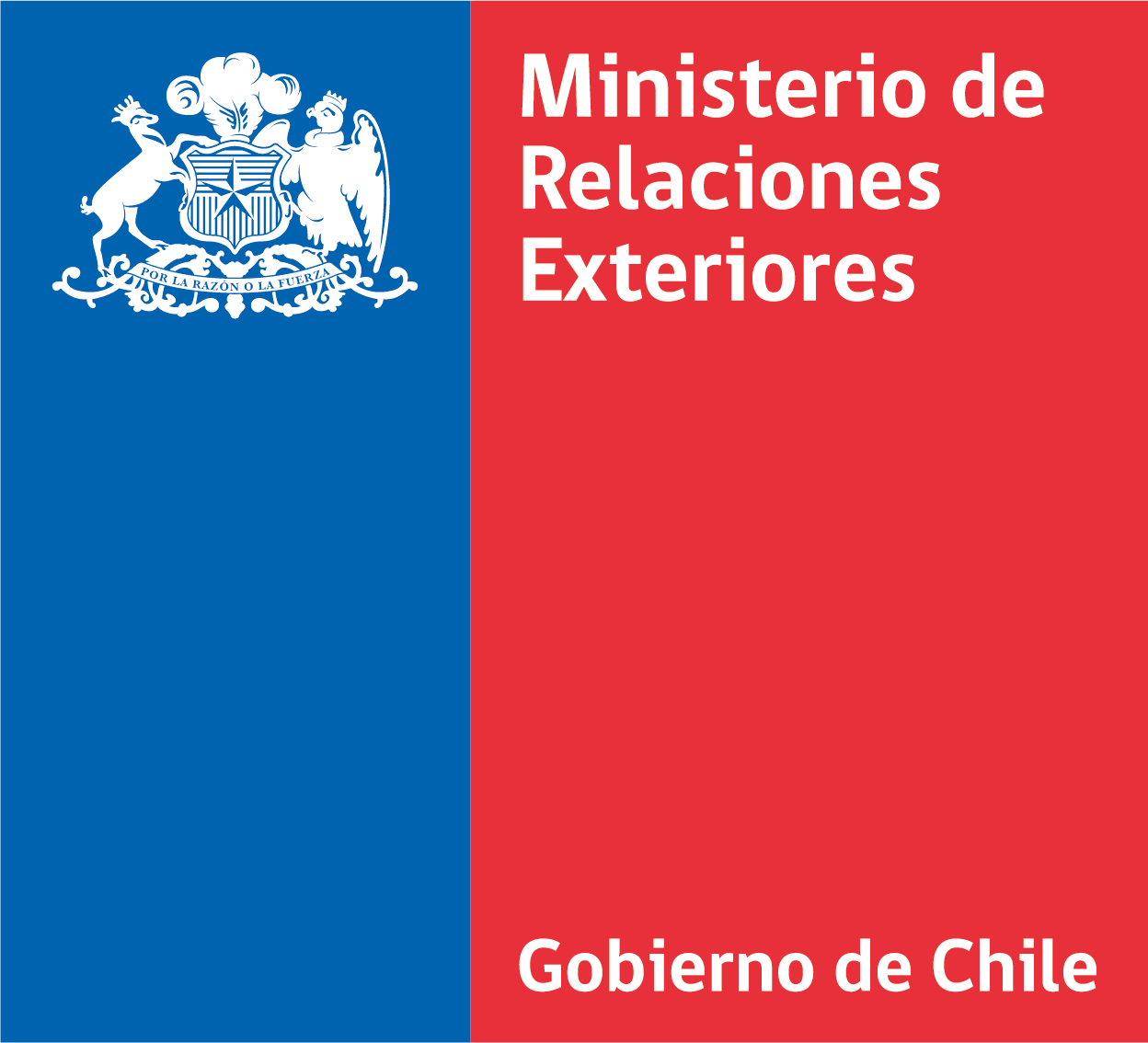

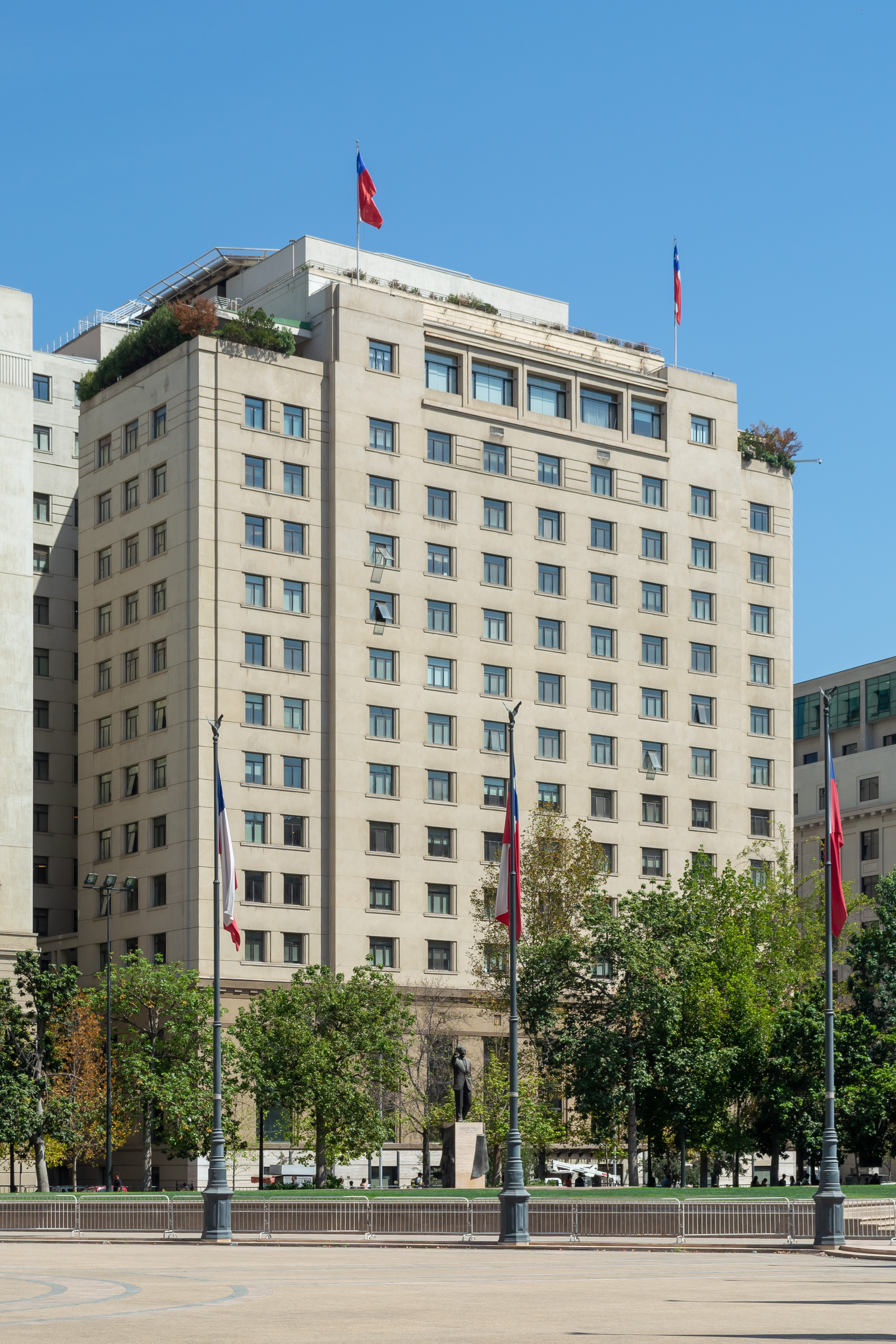
- José Miguel Carrera Building, Santiago, Metropolitan Region, Chile

Agency overview
- Formed: 26 October 1812 (as Secretariat of Foreign Affairs); 5 January 1942 (as Ministry of Foreign Affairs)
- Preceding agencies: Secretariat of Foreign Affairs (1810, 1812-1814); Ministry of Government and Foreign Affairs (1818-1824); Ministry of the Interior and Foreign Affairs (1824-1871); Ministry of Foreign Affairs and Colonization (1871-1887); Ministry of Foreign Affairs, Worship, and Colonization (1888-1924); Ministry of Foreign Affairs (1924-1930) Ministry of Foreign Affairs and Commerce (1930-1941)
- Jurisdiction: Government of Chile
- Headquarters: Teatinos 180, Santiago
- Employees: 2,017 (2025)
- Annual budget: 107,791,085 CLP (2026)
- Agency executives: Francisco Pérez Mackenna, Minister of Foreign Affairs; Patricio Torres Espinosa, Undersecretary of Foreign Affairs; Paula Estévez Weinstein, Undersecretary for International Economic Relations; Alex Wetzig Abdale, Secretary General for Foreign Policy
- Child agencies: Undersecretary of Foreign Affairs (Subsecretaría de Relaciones Exteriores de Chile, Sub. RR.EE.); Undersecretary for International Economic Relations (Subsecretaría de Relaciones Económicas Internacionales, SUBREI); Undersecretary of Commerce (Subsecretaría de Comercio) (1930-1941); General Directorate of International Economic Relations (Dirección General de Relaciones Económicas Internacionales, DIRECON) (1979-2019); National Directorate of State Borders and Boundaries of Chile (Dirección Nacional de Fronteras y Límites del Estado de Chile, DIFROL); General Directorate for Export Promotion (Dirección General de Promoción de Exportaciones, ProChile); Chilean Antarctic Institute (Instituto Antártico Chileno, INACH); Chilean Agency for International Development Cooperation (Agencia Chilena de Cooperación Internacional para el Desarrollo, AGCID); Diplomatic Academy of Chile (Academia Diplomática de Chile); Embassies of Chile
- Website: minrel.gob.cl (in Spanish)

The Ministry of Foreign Affairs of Chile (Spanish: Ministerio de Relaciones Exteriores) is the cabinet-level administrative office in charge of planning, directing, coordinating, executing, controlling and informing the foreign policy formulated by the President of Chile. It is located in the Edificio José Miguel Carrera at Plaza de la Constitución (Constitution Square), in downtown Santiago.

The current minister of foreign affairs (who is also known colloquially as Chancellor) is Francisco Pérez Mackenna.

== History ==
The office was first organized in 1812, during the War of Independence, under the name of Foreign Affairs Secretariat. It was abolished in 1814, after the Battle of Rancagua, when the Spanish government was re-established.

In 1818, after independence, the secretariat was re-established, but this time as a dependency of the Ministry of the Interior, which at that time was named "Ministry of Government and Foreign Affairs" (1818–1824) or "Ministry of the Interior and Foreign Affairs" (1824–1871). In 1871 is established as a separate government entity.

== Mission and objectives ==
According to the website of the Ministry of Foreign Affairs, its mission is to contribute to the formulation of Chile's foreign policy, directing and coordinating its implementation through its organizational structure and the interaction of public and private actors, in order to safeguard the interests of the country and its citizens in their relations with the world.

The ministry's objectives are as follows:

- Work toward building peaceful neighborly relations based on mutual trust, integration, and expanded cooperation.
- Promote regional integration through Chile's participation in the various mechanisms currently underway, generating initiatives and areas of convergence among states, organizations, and relevant actors, while recognizing the diversity of development models, mechanisms, and instruments existing in the hemisphere.
- Contribute to preserving the territorial integrity and political independence of the Republic of Chile in accordance with international law, through participation in the multilateral system (bodies, organizations, conferences, programs, agencies, etc.), with particular emphasis on Chile's contribution to international peace and security, the full implementation of democracy and human rights, and the promotion of sustainable and equitable development. The ministry also seeks to proactively take advantage of the assistance, capacity-building, and educational opportunities offered by the multilateral system.
- Promote and defend recognition of the civic rights of Chilean citizens abroad and develop a migration policy based on respect for international human rights law and the rights of migrants, providing consular assistance and protection to Chilean nationals and foreigners who require consular services in Chile and abroad. It also seeks to strengthen connections and associations among Chilean communities abroad.
- Strengthen policies, initiatives, and strategic ties with different regions of the world and countries of interest through political consultation mechanisms and the activities of Chilean missions abroad, in order to advance the country's economic and human development objectives, prioritizing actions aimed at Chile's educational, scientific, and technological development.
- Coordinate implementation of the “National Antarctic Policy” with the various national Antarctic actors, with the aim of strengthening and increasing Chile's influence within the Antarctic Treaty System and thereby promoting Chile's interests in its Antarctic territory.
- Modernize the structure and management mechanisms of the Ministry of Foreign Relations (the Cancillería) so that it can fully fulfill the objectives of foreign policy and respond to the challenges of a globalized world.
- Strengthen the role of the Diplomatic Academy as a driver of the diplomatic career through high-quality training, as well as promote greater dissemination of foreign policy through professional-development courses and activities aimed at political, economic, and social actors involved in foreign policy.
- Continue promoting a country image consistent with national interests, including effective dissemination of Chilean culture.

== Organization ==
The ministry is composed of two Undersecretariats of State: the Undersecretariat of Foreign Relations and the Undersecretariat of International Economic Relations.

=== General Secretariat of Foreign Policy ===
The ministry also includes the General Secretariat of Foreign Policy (Secretaría General de Política Exterior, abbreviated SEGEN), an institution whose purpose is to study, coordinate, implement, monitor, and provide information on the political and diplomatic activities to be carried out by Chilean embassies and missions around the world, in accordance with the relevant directives.

It consists of a national director, a chief of staff, and five secretaries. Since March 11, 2026, the SEGEN has been headed by Ambassador Frank Tressler Zamorano.

==== Functions ====
SEGEN has five main functions:

- As the body responsible for implementing and coordinating Chile's international policy, the General Secretariat receives information provided by Chilean embassies and missions abroad and, in coordination with the minister and undersecretary, issues instructions to embassies and subordinate departments.
- The body is also responsible for the “International Meetings in Chile Program” (Programa de Reuniones Internacionales en Chile) and for monitoring the performance indicators and commitments of its subordinate departments. At the same time, it coordinates the implementation of the “Specific Activities Abroad Program” (Programa de Actividades Específicas en el Exterior, PAEE) and “Political and Strategic Engagements” (Acercamientos Políticos y Estratégicos, APE) carried out by Chilean embassies.
- It is responsible for coordinating the Ministry of Foreign Relations with other ministries and government bodies on matters affecting Chile's foreign policy. It is also responsible for coordinating international interinstitutional agreements.
- SEGEN is responsible for coordinating, reviewing, and approving briefing notes, background materials, and other inputs prepared for the senior authorities of the Ministry of Foreign Relations.
- In carrying out its activities, the organization maintains close coordination with the offices of the minister and undersecretary, as well as with the other General Directorates of the Ministry of Foreign Relations.

==== Departments Reporting to the General Secretariat of Foreign Policy ====
The following departments report to SEGEN:

- Division of South America (División de América del Sur, DIRAMESUR)
- Division of North America, Central America and the Caribbean (División América del Norte, Centroamérica y Caribe, DIRAMENORTE)
- Division of Europe (División de Europa, DIREUROPA)
- Division of Asia-Pacific (División de Asia Pacífico, DIRAPAC)
- Division of the Middle East and Africa (División de Medio Oriente y África, DIREMOA)
- Division of Multilateral Affairs (División de Asuntos Multilaterales)
- Division of Regional Multilateral Integration (División de Integración Regional Multilateral)
- Division of Antarctic Affairs (División de Asuntos Antárticos)
- Division of Science, Energy, Education, Innovation, and Astronomy (División de Ciencias, Energía, Educación, Innovación y Astronomía)
- Division of Cultures, Arts, Heritage and Public Diplomacy (División de las Culturas, las Artes, el Patrimonio y Diplomacia Pública, DIRAC)
- Division of Human Rights (División de Derechos Humanos)
- Division of Environment, Climate Change and Oceans (División de Medio Ambiente, Cambio Climático y Océanos)
- Division of International and Human Security (División de Seguridad Internacional y Humana)
- Division of Gender Affairs (División de Asuntos de Género)

=== Subordinate agencies ===
Five agencies also operate under the ministry:

- General Directorate for the Promotion of Exports (Dirección General de Promoción de Exportaciones, PROCHILE): Implements the policies formulated by the ministry concerning participation in foreign trade, in accordance with ministry directives regarding the promotion, diversification, and encouragement of exports of goods and services.
- Chilean Agency for International Cooperation for Development (Agencia Chilena de Cooperación Internacional para el Desarrollo, AGCID): Provides advice on international development cooperation and promotes South-South and triangular cooperation, both as a recipient and provider, particularly in Central America and the Caribbean.
- National Directorate of State Borders and Boundaries (Dirección Nacional de Fronteras y Límites del Estado de Chile, DIFROL)
- Chilean Antarctic Institute (Instituto Antártico Chileno, INACH)
- Andrés Bello Diplomatic Academy (Academia Diplomática Andrés Bello, ADAB): An institution responsible for the education and preparation of members of Chile's Foreign Service.

== Titulars ==
=== Ministers of foreign affairs and colonization ===
Picture	Name	Entered office	Exited office	Notes	Appointed by
	Adolfo Ibáñez	1871	1875		Federico Errázuriz Zañartu
	Enrique Cood	1875	1876		Federico Errázuriz Zañartu
	José Alfonso Cavada	1876	1878		Aníbal Pinto
	Alejandro Fierro Pérez	1878	1879		Aníbal Pinto
	Domingo Santa María	1879	1879		Aníbal Pinto
	Miguel Luis Amunátegui	1879	1880		Aníbal Pinto
	Melquiades Valderrama	1880	1881		Aníbal Pinto
	José Manuel Balmaceda Fernández	1881	1882		Domingo Santa María
	Luis Aldunate Carrera	1882	1884		Domingo Santa María
	Aniceto Vergara Albano	1884	1885		Domingo Santa María
	Aníbal Zañartu Zañartu	1885	1886		Domingo Santa María
	Joaquín Godoy Cruz	1886	1886		José Manuel Balmaceda
	Francisco Freire Caldera	1886	1887		José Manuel Balmaceda

=== Ministers of foreign affairs and worship ===
Picture	Name	Entered office	Exited office	Notes	Appointed by
	Miguel Luis Amunátegui	1887	1888		José Manuel Balmaceda
	Augusto Matte Pérez	1888	1888		José Manuel Balmaceda
	Demetrio Lastarria	1888	1889		José Manuel Balmaceda
	Mariano Sánchez Fontecilla	1889	1889		José Manuel Balmaceda
	Eduardo Matte Pérez	1889	1890		José Manuel Balmaceda
	Juan Castellón Larenas	1890	1890		José Manuel Balmaceda
	Juan Eduardo Mackenna Astorga	1890	1890		José Manuel Balmaceda
	José Tocornal	1890	1891		José Manuel Balmaceda
	Domingo Godoy Cruz	1891	1891		José Manuel Balmaceda
	Ricardo Cruzat Hurtado	1891	1891		José Manuel Balmaceda
	Manuel Aldunate Solar	1891	29 August 1891		José Manuel Balmaceda
	Manuel Antonio Matta	7 September 1891	26 December 1891		Revolutionary Junta of Iquique
	Luis Pereira Cotapos	26 December 1891	1892		Jorge Montt
	Juan Castellón Larenas	1892	1892		Jorge Montt
	Isidoro Errázuriz Errázuriz	1892	1893		Jorge Montt
	Ventura Blanco Viel	1893	1894		Jorge Montt
	Mariano Sánchez Fontecilla	1894	1894		Jorge Montt
	Luis Barros Borgoño	1894	1895		Jorge Montt
	Claudio Matte Pérez	1895	1895		Jorge Montt
	Adolfo Guerrero Vergara	1895	18 September 1896		Jorge Montt

=== Ministers of foreign affairs, worship and colonization ===
Picture	Name	Entered office	Exited office	Notes	Appointed by
	Enrique de Putrón	18 September 1896	1896		Federico Errázuriz Echaurren
	Carlos Morla Vicuña	1896	1897		Federico Errázuriz Echaurren
	Raimundo Silva Cruz	1897	1898		Federico Errázuriz Echaurren
	Juan José Latorre	1898	1898		Federico Errázuriz Echaurren
	Ventura Blanco Viel	1898	1899		Federico Errázuriz Echaurren
	Federico Puga	1899	1899		Federico Errázuriz Echaurren
	Rafael Valentín Errázuriz	1899	1899		Federico Errázuriz Echaurren
	Manuel Salinas	1899	1900		Federico Errázuriz Echaurren
	Emilio Bello	1900	1900		Federico Errázuriz Echaurren
	Raimundo Silva	1900	1901		Federico Errázuriz Echaurren
	Luis Rodríguez Herrera	1901	18 September 1901	Appointed by	Federico Errázuriz Echaurren
	Luis Rodríguez Herrera	1901	18 September 1901	Reappointed by	Aníbal Zañartu
	Eliodoro Yáñez Ponce de León	18 September 1901	1902		Germán Riesco
	Horacio Pinto Agüero	1902	1902		Germán Riesco
	José Vergara Donoso	5 May 1902	1903		Germán Riesco
	Máximo del Campo	1903	1903		Germán Riesco
	Agustín Edwards Mac Clure	1903	1903		Germán Riesco
	Rafael Sotomayor Gaete	1903	1904		Germán Riesco
	Emilio Bello Codecido	1904	1904		Germán Riesco
	Adolfo Guerrero Vergara	1904	1904		Germán Riesco
	Raimundo Silva Cruz	1904	1904		Germán Riesco
	Luis Vergara Ruiz	1904	1905		Germán Riesco
	Agustín Edwards Mac Clure	1905	1905		Germán Riesco
	Federico Puga	1905	1906		Germán Riesco
	Santiago Aldunate B.	1906	1906		Germán Riesco
	Antonio Huneeus	1906	18 September 1906		Germán Riesco
	Ricardo Salas	18 September 1906	1907		Pedro Montt
	Federico Puga	1907	1908		Pedro Montt
	José Rafael Balmaceda Fernández	1908	1909		Pedro Montt
	Agustín Edwards Mac Clure	1909	1910		Pedro Montt
	Luis Izquierdo Fredes	1910	23 December 1910		Pedro Montt
	Rafael Orrego González	23 December 1910	1911		Ramón Barros Luco
	Enrique Rodríguez Carmona	1911	1912		Ramón Barros Luco
	Joaquín Figueroa Larraín	1912	1912		Ramón Barros Luco
	Antonio Huneeus	1912	1912		Ramón Barros Luco
	Renato Sánchez García de la Huerta	1912	1913		Ramón Barros Luco
	Enrique Villegas	1913	1914		Ramón Barros Luco
	Alejandro Lira Lira	1914	1914		Ramón Barros Luco
	Manuel Salinas González	1914	1915		Ramón Barros Luco
	Rafael Orrego Gónzalez	1915	23 December 1915		Ramón Barros Luco
	Ramón Subercaseaux Vicuña	23 December 1915	27 April 1916		Juan Luis Sanfuentes
	Silvestre Ochagavía	27 April 1916	1 July 1916		Juan Luis Sanfuentes
	Juan Enrique Tocornal	1 July 1916	20 November 1916		Juan Luis Sanfuentes
	Alamiro García-Huidobro	20 November 1916	14 July 1917		Juan Luis Sanfuentes
	Arturo Besa Navarro	14 July 1917	13 October 1917		Juan Luis Sanfuentes
	Eduardo Suárez Mujica	13 October 1917	18 January 1918		Juan Luis Sanfuentes
	Guillermo Pereira Iñiguez	18 January 1918	22 April 1918		Juan Luis Sanfuentes
	Daniel Feliú	22 April 1918	6 September 1918		Juan Luis Sanfuentes
	Ruperto Bahamonde	6 September 1918	28 November 1918		Juan Luis Sanfuentes
	Luis Barros Borgoño	28 November 1918	8 November 1919		Juan Luis Sanfuentes
	Alamiro García-Huidobro	8 November 1919	29 March 1920		Juan Luis Sanfuentes
	Antonio Huneeus	29 March 1920	1 July 1920		Juan Luis Sanfuentes
	Luis Aldunate Echeverría	1 July 1920	23 December 1920		Juan Luis Sanfuentes
	Jorge Matte Gormaz	23 December 1920	1921		Arturo Alessandri
	Ernesto Barros Jarpa	1921	1922		Arturo Alessandri
	Samuel Claro Lastarria	1922	16 October 1922		Arturo Alessandri
	Carlos Aldunate Solar	16 October 1922	21 December 1922		Arturo Alessandri
	Luis Izquierdo Fredes	21 December 1922	1923		Arturo Alessandri
	Pedro Rivas Vicuña	1923	1923		Arturo Alessandri
	Emilio Bello Codecido	1923	1923		Arturo Alessandri
	Armando Jaramillo Valderrama	1923	1924		Arturo Alessandri
	Roberto Sánchez García de la Huerta	1924	14 March 1924		Arturo Alessandri
	Galvarino Gallardo Nieto	14 March 1924	20 July 1924		Arturo Alessandri
	Ramón Briones Luco	20 July 1924	1924		Arturo Alessandri
	Emilio Bello Codecido	1924	12 September 1924		Arturo Alessandri

=== Ministers of foreign affairs (first creation) ===
Picture	Name	Entered office	Exited office	Notes	Appointed by
	Carlos Aldunate Solar	12 September 1924	23 January 1925		September Junta
	Jorge Matte Gormaz	29 January 1925	13 October 1925		January Junta
	Ernesto Barros Jarpa	13 October 1925	23 December 1925		Luis Barros Borgoño
	Beltrán Mathieu Andrews	23 December 1925	2 August 1926		Emiliano Figueroa
	Antonio Huneeus Gana	2 August 1926	20 November 1926		Emiliano Figueroa
	Jorge Matte Gormaz	20 November 1926	22 February 1927		Emiliano Figueroa
	Conrado Ríos Gallardo	22 February 1927	3 September 1929		Emiliano Figueroa

=== Ministers of foreign affairs and commerce ===
Picture	Name	Entered office	Exited office	Notes	Appointed by
	Manuel Barros Castañón	3 September 1929	27 April 1931		Carlos Ibáñez del Campo
	Antonio Planet	27 April 1931	13 July 1931		Carlos Ibáñez del Campo
	Carlos Aldunate Errázuriz	13 July 1931	22 July 1931		Carlos Ibáñez del Campo
	Guillermo Edwards Matte	22 July 1931	23 July 1931		Carlos Ibáñez del Campo
	Alberto Edwards Vives	23 July 1931	26 July 1931		Carlos Ibáñez del Campo
	Carlos Balmaceda Saavedra	26 July 1931	3 September 1931	Appointed by	Pedro Opazo
	Carlos Balmaceda Saavedra	26 July 1931	3 September 1931	Reappointed by	Juan Esteban Montero
	Carlos Balmaceda Saavedra	26 July 1931	3 September 1931	Reappointed by	Manuel Trucco
	Luis Izquierdo Fredes	3 September 1931	15 November 1931		Manuel Trucco
	Carlos Balmaceda Saavedra	15 November 1931	5 June 1932		Juan Esteban Montero
	Luis Barriga Errázuriz	5 June 1932	3 October 1932	Appointed by	Socialist Junta
	Luis Barriga Errázuriz	5 June 1932	3 October 1932	Reappointed by	Carlos Dávila
	Luis Barriga Errázuriz	5 June 1932	3 October 1932	Reappointed by	Bartolomé Blanche
	Jorge Matte Gormaz	3 October 1932	24 December 1932		Abraham Oyanedel
	Miguel Cruchaga Tocornal	24 December 1932	14 February 1937		Arturo Alessandri
	Gustavo Ross Santa María	14 February 1937	24 March 1937		Arturo Alessandri
	José Gutiérrez Alliende	24 March 1937	15 September 1938		Arturo Alessandri
	Luis Arteaga García	15 September 1938	24 December 1938		Arturo Alessandri
	Abraham Ortega Aguayo	24 December 1938	8 February 1940		Pedro Aguirre Cerda
	Cristóbal Sáenz Cerda	8 February 1940	30 July 1940		Pedro Aguirre Cerda
	Marcial Mora Miranda	30 July 1940	7 November 1940		Pedro Aguirre Cerda
	Manuel Bianchi Gundián	7 November 1940	26 March 1941		Pedro Aguirre Cerda
	Luis Álamos Barros	26 March 1941	10 June 1941		Pedro Aguirre Cerda
	Juan Bautista Rossetti Colombino	10 June 1941	2 April 1942		Pedro Aguirre Cerda

=== Ministers of foreign affairs (second creation) ===
Picture	Name	Entered office	Exited office	Notes	Appointed by
	Ernesto Barros Jarpa	2 April 1942	21 October 1942		Juan Antonio Ríos
	Joaquín Fernández	21 October 1942	3 November 1946		Juan Antonio Ríos
	Raúl Juliet Gomez	3 November 1946	2 August 1947		Gabriel González Videla
	Germán Vergara Donoso	2 August 1947	6 July 1948		Gabriel González Videla
	Germán Riesco Errázuriz	7 July 1948	27 February 1950		Gabriel González Videla
	Horacio Walker Larraín	27 February 1950	19 June 1951		Gabriel González Videla
	Eduardo Yrarrázabal	19 June 1951	29 July 1952		Gabriel González Videla
	Fernando García Oldini	29 July 1952	3 November 1952		Gabriel González Videla
	Arturo Olavarría Bravo	3 November 1952	1952		Carlos Ibáñez del Campo
	Oscar Fenner	1953	1954		Carlos Ibáñez del Campo
	Roberto Aldunate	1954	15 January 1954		Carlos Ibáñez del Campo
	Tobías Barros	15 January 1954	6 January 1955		Carlos Ibáñez del Campo
	Osvaldo Koch	6 January 1955	30 May 1955		Carlos Ibáñez del Campo
	Kaare Olsen	30 May 1955	2 January 1956		Carlos Ibáñez del Campo
	José Serrano Palma	2 January 1956	4 January 1956		Carlos Ibáñez del Campo
	Enrique Barbosa	4 January 1956	24 May 1956		Carlos Ibáñez del Campo
	Osvaldo Sainte Marie	24 May 1956	28 October 1957		Carlos Ibáñez del Campo
	Alberto Sepúlveda	28 October 1957	3 November 1958		Carlos Ibáñez del Campo
	Germán Vergara Donoso	3 November 1958	26 August 1961		Jorge Alessandri
	Carlos Martinez Sotomayor	26 August 1961	17 December 1963		Jorge Alessandri
	Julio Philippi Izquierdo	17 December 1963	3 November 1964		Jorge Alessandri
	Gabriel Valdés Subercaseaux	3 November 1964	3 November 1970		Eduardo Frei Montalva
	Clodomiro Almeyda Medina	3 November 1970	5 July 1973		Salvador Allende
	Orlando Letelier del Solar	5 July 1973	8 August 1973		Salvador Allende
	Clodomiro Almeyda Medina	8 August 1973	11 September 1973		Salvador Allende
	Ismael Huerta Díaz	12 September 1973	3 July 1974		Augusto Pinochet
	Patricio Carvajal Prado	3 July 1974	20 April 1978		Augusto Pinochet
	Hernán Cubillos Sallato	20 April 1978	20 March 1980		Augusto Pinochet
	René Rojas Galdames	20 March 1980	14 February 1983		Augusto Pinochet
	Miguel Schweitzer Walters	15 February 1983	19 December 1983		Augusto Pinochet
	Jaime del Valle	19 December 1983	7 July 1987		Augusto Pinochet
	Ricardo García Rodríguez	8 July 1987	21 October 1988		Augusto Pinochet
	Hernán Felipe Errázuriz	22 October 1988	11 March 1990		Augusto Pinochet
	Enrique Silva Cimma	11 March 1990	11 March 1994		Patricio Aylwin
	Carlos Figueroa Serrano	11 March 1994	20 September 1994		Eduardo Frei Ruiz-Tagle
	José Miguel Insulza Salinas	20 September 1994	21 June 1999		Eduardo Frei Ruiz-Tagle
	Juan Gabriel Valdés Soublette	22 June 1999	11 March 2000		Eduardo Frei Ruiz-Tagle
	María Soledad Alvear Valenzuela	11 March 2000	1 October 2004		Ricardo Lagos
	Ignacio Walker Prieto	1 October 2004	11 March 2006		Ricardo Lagos
	Alejandro Foxley Rioseco	11 March 2006	12 March 2009		Michelle Bachelet
	Mariano Fernández	12 March 2009	11 March 2010		Michelle Bachelet
	Alfredo Moreno Charme	11 March 2010	11 March 2014		Sebastián Piñera
	Heraldo Muñoz	11 March 2014	11 March 2018		Michelle Bachelet
	Roberto Ampuero	11 March 2018	13 June 2019		Sebastián Piñera
	Teodoro Ribera	13 June 2019	28 July 2020		Sebastián Piñera
	Andrés Allamand	28 July 2020	6 February 2022		Sebastián Piñera
	Antonia Urrejola	11 March 2022	10 March 2023		Gabriel Boric
	Alberto van Klaveren	10 March 2023	11 March 2026		Gabriel Boric
	Francisco Pérez Mackenna	11 March 2026	Incumbent		José Antonio Kast

== Additional information ==
=== See also ===
- Foreign relations of Chile
- List of diplomatic missions in Chile
- List of diplomatic missions of Chile
