= Opazo =

Opazo (Latin America: [oˈpa.so], Spain: [oˈpa.θo]) is a Spanish surname.

Notable people with this surname include:

- Daniel Opazo (born 1996), Argentinian footballer
- Diego Opazo (born 1991), Chilean footballer
- Eduardo Opazo Letelier (1865–1925), Chilean politician
- Mario Opazo (born 1969), Colombian artist
- Mirko Opazo (born 1991), Chilean footballer
- Óscar Opazo (born 1990), Chilean footballer
- Yerson Opazo (born 1984), Chilean footballer

== See also ==
- Pedro Opaso (same pronunciation) (1876-1957), Chilean politician
