= Juan Esteban Montero =

Chilean political figure (1879–1948)

Juan Esteban Montero OMCh
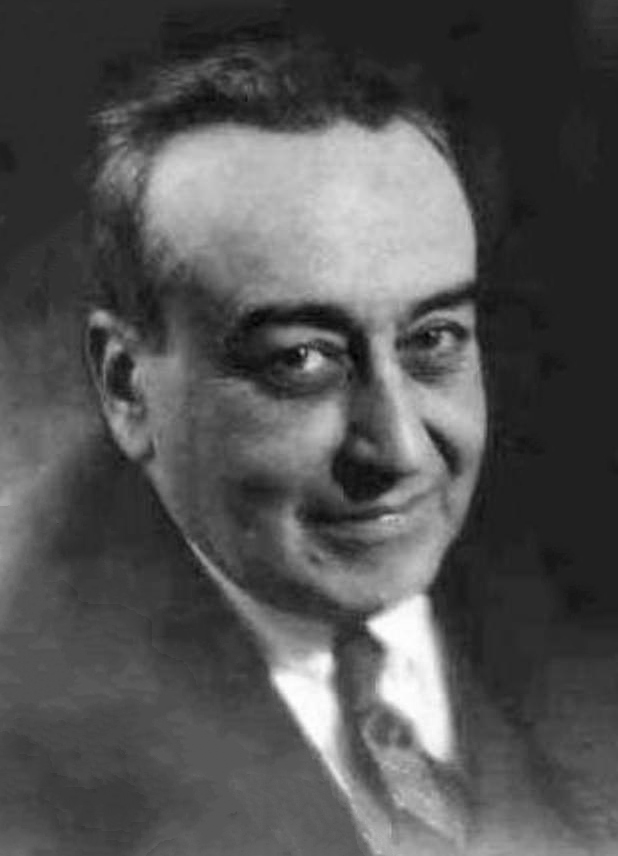

21st President of Chile
- In office 4 December 1931 – 4 June 1932
- Preceded by: Carlos Ibáñez del Campo
- Succeeded by: Government Junta

Acting President of Chile
- In office November 15, 1931 – December 4, 1931
- Preceded by: Manuel Trucco
- In office July 27, 1931 – August 20, 1931
- Preceded by: Pedro Opaso
- Succeeded by: Manuel Trucco

Personal details
- Born: February 12, 1879 Santiago, Chile
- Died: February 25, 1948 (aged 69) Santiago, Chile
- Party: Radical
- Spouse: Graciela Fehrman Martínez
- Children: Juan Esteban; Pedro; Benjamín; Carmen
- Education: University of Chile
- Occupation: Lawyer

Juan Esteban Montero Rodríguez (February 12, 1879 – February 25, 1948) was a Chilean political figure. He served twice as president of Chile between 1931 and 1932. He was overthrown in the 1932 military coup.

== Early life ==
He was born in Santiago, the son of Benjamín Montero and of Eugenia Rodríguez. Juan Esteban Montero studied at the colegio de San Ignacio and at the Universidad de Chile. He graduated as a lawyer on September 16, 1901, and soon after became professor of civil and Roman law at his alma mater. He also worked as a government lawyer and in private practice. He married Graciela Fehrman Martínez, with whom he had four children: Juan Esteban, Pedro, Benjamín and Carmen.

== Presidency ==
Montero's first incursion in politics was in 1931, when President Carlos Ibáñez del Campo named him Minister of the Interior and Social Welfare. After the resignation of president Ibáñez on July 26, 1931, he reluctantly agreed to serve in similar position to Ibáñez's successor, Pedro Opazo; just to find himself promoted to president the very next day, after Opazo's resignation. Montero, as a way out of the political impasse, immediately called for presidential elections. In the meanwhile he assumed as vice president.

Very soon after, Montero accepted the presidential nomination of the Radical Party, and in order to qualify, he resigned his vicepresidency on August 20, 1931. The position was assumed by Manuel Trucco. The Trucco administration was only supposed to be a caretaker one, keeping order in the country until the presidential elections. Nonetheless, it was faced with very difficult moments such as the Sailors' mutiny in the navy, caused by the reduction of the salaries of the enlisted men (September 1–5, 1931), which was controlled only after an aerial bombing of the fleet and presaged difficult times ahead.

Supported by the Liberals and Conservatives as well as the Radicals, Juan Esteban Montero was the clear winner of the presidential elections, obtaining almost 64% of the popular vote, defeating leftist José Santos Salas, a protégé of former President Carlos Ibáñez. He took over on November 15, in the midst of a political and economic chaos that resulted from the market crash of 1929. His program called for the implementation of an austerity program that involved the reduction of public expenditures and public salaries, a downsizing of the public administration and an increase of the foreign debt. Notwithstanding these harsh measures, the depreciation of the currency continued, and inflation soared while the Central Bank reserves were at an all-time low. This economic program only managed to cause widespread discontent, while in no way improving the economy, and in turn led to his downfall.

On June 4, 1932, colonel Marmaduke Grove staged a coup d'état by taking over the Air Force base of El Bosque, in Santiago, and demanding the resignation of President Montero. Montero refused to call on the army to put down the coup, and instead chose to resign. That same night, the victorious revolutionaries organized a Government Junta composed of retired General Arturo Puga, Eugenio Matte and Carlos Dávila, with colonel Grove as their minister of Defense. After this episode, Montero retired completely from politics, and went back to private practice and business. He died in Santiago, on February 25, 1948, at the age of 69.

== Cabinet ==
Portfolio	Minister	Took office	Left office	Party
First Ministry
Minister of the Interior	Marcial Mora	15 November 1931	7 April 1932	Radical
Minister of Foreign Affairs and Commerce	Carlos Balmaceda Saavedra	15 November 1931	8 April 1932	United Liberal
Minister of Finance	Luis Izquierdo Fredes	15 November 1931	8 April 1932	United Liberal
Minister of Justice	Luis Gutiérrez Alliende	15 November 1931	8 April 1932	Conservative
Minister of Public Education	Santiago Labarca	15 November 1931	8 April 1932	Radical
Minister of War	Carlos Vergara Montero	15 November 1931	4 March 1932	Military
Minister of Navy	Enrique Spoerer	15 November 1931	4 March 1932	Military
Minister of National Defense	Miguel Urrutia Barboza	9 March 1932	8 April 1932	United Liberal
Minister of Development	Herman Echeverría	15 November 1931	8 April 1932	United Liberal
Minister of Social Welfare	Sótero del Río	15 November 1931	8 April 1932	Radical
Minister of Land and Colonisation	Teodoberto Álvarez	15 November 1931	8 April 1932	Democrat
Minister of Agriculture	Joaquín Prieto Concha	15 November 1931	8 April 1932	Conservative
Second Ministry
Minister of the Interior	Víctor Vicente Robles	7 April 1932	4 June 1932	Radical
Minister of Foreign Affairs and Commerce	Carlos Balmaceda Saavedra	8 April 1932	4 June 1932	United Liberal
Minister of Finance	Luis Izquierdo Fredes	8 April 1932	4 June 1932	United Liberal
Minister of Justice	Arturo Ureta Echazarreta	8 April 1932	4 June 1932	Conservative
Minister of Public Education	Alfredo Bravo Zamora	8 April 1932	4 June 1932	Radical
Minister of National Defense	Ignacio Urrutia Manzano	8 April 1932	4 June 1932	United Liberal
Minister of Development	Marco Antonio de la Cuadra	8 April 1932	4 June 1932	United Liberal
Minister of Social Welfare	Sótero del Río	8 April 1932	4 June 1932	Radical
Minister of Land and Colonisation	Gaspar Mora	8 April 1932	4 June 1932	Democrat
Minister of Agriculture	Héctor Rodríguez de la Sotta	8 April 1932	4 June 1932	Conservative

== See also ==
- History of Chile
- Norte Grande insurrection
- Government Junta of Chile (1932)
- Socialist Republic of Chile
- List of Chilean coups d'état

Political offices
Preceded by Carlos Frödden	Minister of the Interior and Social Welfare; 1931	Succeeded by Miguel Letelier
Preceded by Carlos Frödden	Minister of the Interior; 1931	Succeeded by Luis Gutiérrez
Preceded by Pedro Opazo	President of Chile; 1931	Succeeded by Manuel Trucco
Preceded by Manuel Trucco	President of Chile; 1931–1932	Succeeded by Arturo Puga
