= List of ambassadors of Chile to the United States =

Coordinates: 38.90855°N 77.039913°W

Ambassador of Chile to the United States
- Coat of Arms of Chile

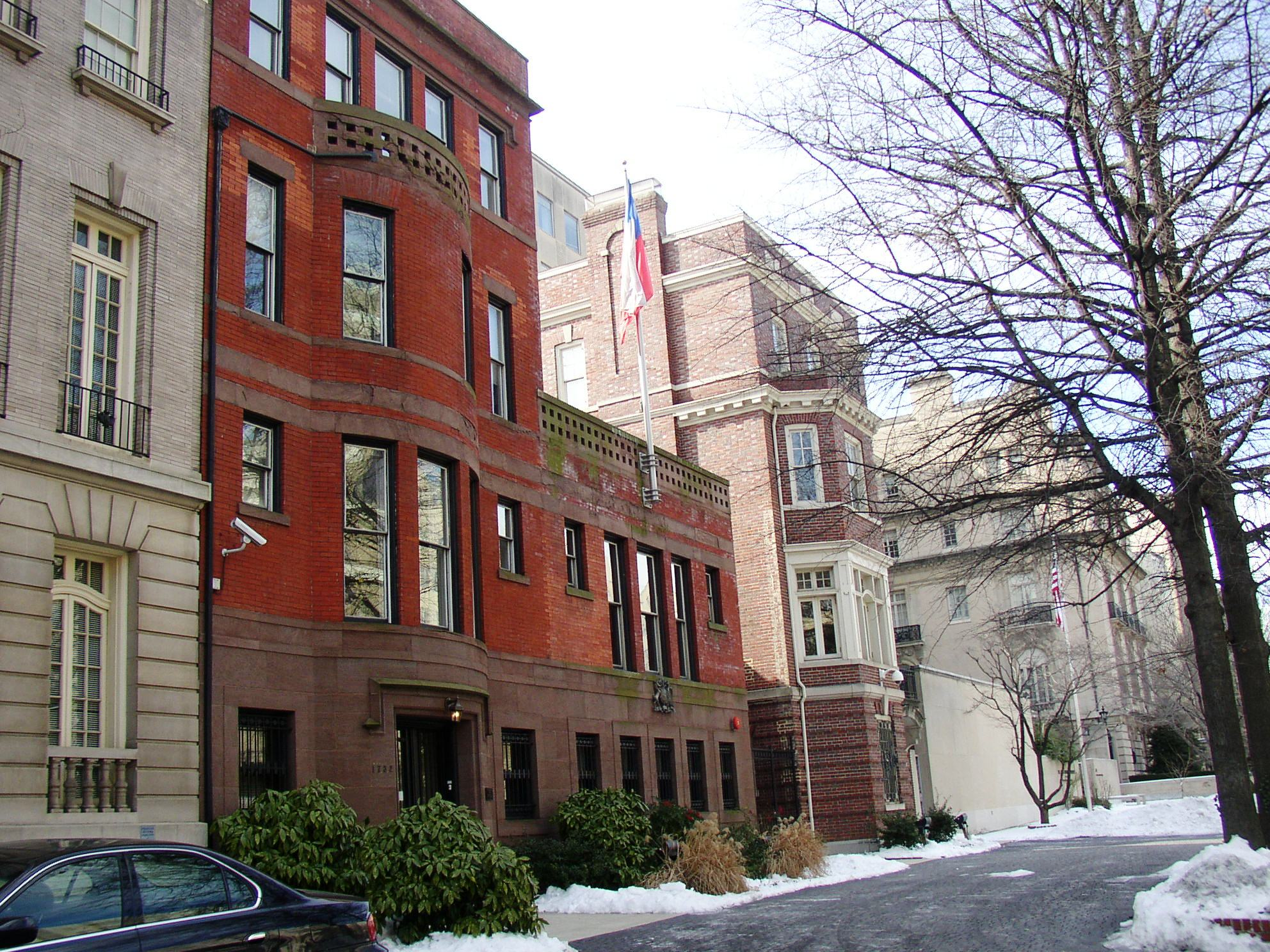
- Incumbent; Andrés Ergas Heymann since April 15, 2026
- Inaugural holder: Domingo Gama
- Formation: June 21, 1893

The Chilean ambassador in Washington, D.C. is the official representative of the Government in Santiago de Chile to the Government of the United States.

== List of representatives ==
| Agrément | Diplomatic accreditation | Ambassador | Observations | List of presidents of Chile | List of presidents of the United States | Term end |
|---|---|---|---|---|---|---|
| June 21, 1893 | | Domingo Gama | | Jorge Montt Álvarez | Grover Cleveland | |
| April 1, 1898 | | Eliodoro Infante | Chargé d'affaires | Federico Errázuriz Echaurren | William McKinley | |
| August 16, 1898 | | Carlos Morla Vicuña | (1846, Santiago de Chile – 1900, Buffalo, New York) December 28, 1896 May 11, 1897: Chilean Minister of Foreign affairs, Cult and Colonization, also accreditedt to Japan. | Federico Errázuriz Echaurren | William McKinley | |
| September 1, 1901 | | Eliodoro Infante | Chargé d'affaires. | Aníbal Zañartu | Theodore Roosevelt | |
| March 4, 1902 | | Joaquin Walker-Martinez | | Aníbal Zañartu | Theodore Roosevelt | |
| November 16, 1907 | | Anibal Cruz | | Pedro Montt Montt | Theodore Roosevelt | |
| December 18, 1910 | | Alberto Yoacham | Chargé d'affaires. | Elías Fernández Albano | William Howard Taft | |
| June 27, 1911 | | Eduardo Suarez | On December 1, 1914, the mission was upgraded to an embassy. | Elías Fernández Albano | William Howard Taft | |
| December 1, 1914 | | Eduardo Suarez-Mujica | | Elías Fernández Albano | Woodrow Wilson | |
| June 16, 1916 | | Gustavo Munizaga-Varela | Chargé d'affaires. | Juan Luis Sanfuentes Andonaegui | Woodrow Wilson | |
| April 16, 1917 | | Santiago Aldunate | (; † April 17, 1918) | Juan Luis Sanfuentes Andonaegui | Woodrow Wilson | |
| April 17, 1918 | | Gustavo Munizaga Varela | Chargé d'affaires. | Juan Luis Sanfuentes Andonaegui | Woodrow Wilson | |
| November 27, 1918 | | Beltran Mathieu | | Juan Luis Sanfuentes Andonaegui | Woodrow Wilson | |
| March 23, 1926 | | Miguel Cruchaga Tocornal | | Arturo Alessandri Palma | Calvin Coolidge | |
| October 6, 1927 | | Carlos G. Davila | | Carlos Ibáñez del Campo | Calvin Coolidge | |
| September 18, 1931 | | Miguel Cruchaga Tocornal | | Pedro Opazo | Herbert C. Hoover | |
| October 17, 1933 | | Manuel Trucco | | Carlos Dávila | Franklin D. Roosevelt | |
| May 24, 1939 | May 25, 1939 | Alberto Cabero Diaz | | Pedro Aguirre Cerda | Franklin D. Roosevelt | |
| November 16, 1940 | | Guillermo Gazitua | Chargé d'affaires | Pedro Aguirre Cerda | Franklin D. Roosevelt | |
| January 16, 1941 | January 17, 1941 | Rodolfo Michels | | Jerónimo Méndez | Franklin D. Roosevelt | |
| January 1, 1943 | | Luis Muñoz Cortés | | Juan Antonio Ríos Morales | Franklin D. Roosevelt | 1947 |
| September 22, 1944 | October 5, 1944 | Marcial Mora | | Juan Antonio Ríos Morales | Franklin D. Roosevelt | |
| January 14, 1947 | January 27, 1947 | Felix Nieto del Rio | | Alfredo Duhalde | Harry S. Truman | |
| February 11, 1953 | February 24, 1953 | Anibal Jara | | Carlos Ibáñez del Campo | Dwight D. Eisenhower | |
| February 6, 1956 | February 7, 1956 | Mario Rodriguez Altamirano | | Carlos Ibáñez del Campo | Dwight D. Eisenhower | |
| March 12, 1957 | March 12, 1957 | Mariano Puga | | Carlos Ibáñez del Campo | Dwight D. Eisenhower | |
| June 25, 1958 | July 16, 1958 | José Serrano Palma | | Jorge Alessandri Rodríguez | Dwight D. Eisenhower | |
| January 30, 1959 | February 13, 1959 | Walter Müller Hess | | Jorge Alessandri Rodríguez | Dwight D. Eisenhower | |
| February 11, 1963 | February 21, 1963 | Sergio Gutierrez-Olivos | | Jorge Alessandri Rodríguez | Lyndon B. Johnson | |
| March 12, 1965 | April 13, 1965 | Radomiro Tomic | | Eduardo Frei Montalva | Lyndon B. Johnson | |
| July 1, 1968 | July 1, 1968 | Domingo Santa María Santa Cruz | | Eduardo Frei Montalva | Lyndon B. Johnson | |
| February 22, 1971 | March 2, 1971 | Orlando Letelier | | Salvador Allende Gossens | Richard Nixon | |
| July 30, 1973 | | Patricio Rodríguez | Chargé d'affaires | Augusto Pinochet Ugarte | Richard Nixon | |
| November 5, 1973 | November 9, 1973 | Walter Herbert Heitmann Wörner | | Augusto Pinochet Ugarte | Richard Nixon | |
| March 31, 1975 | | Enrique Guzman | Chargé d'affaires | Augusto Pinochet Ugarte | Gerald Ford | |
| April 9, 1975 | April 29, 1975 | Manuel Trucco Gaete | | Augusto Pinochet Ugarte | Gerald Ford | |
| March 10, 1977 | March 23, 1977 | Jorge Cauas | | Augusto Pinochet Ugarte | Jimmy Carter | |
| May 18, 1978 | June 5, 1978 | José Miguel | | Augusto Pinochet Ugarte | Jimmy Carter | |
| June 29, 1981 | | Carlos De Costa Nora | Chargé d'affaires | Augusto Pinochet Ugarte | Ronald Reagan | |
| July 27, 1981 | September 21, 1981 | Valenzuela Blanquier | | Augusto Pinochet Ugarte | Ronald Reagan | |
| May 21, 1984 | June 18, 1984 | Hernán Felipe Errázuriz | | Augusto Pinochet Ugarte | Ronald Reagan | |
| March 2, 1989 | May 11, 1989 | Octavio Errázuriz | | Augusto Pinochet Ugarte | George H. W. Bush | |
| April 23, 1990 | May 29, 1990 | Patricio Silva Echenique | | Patricio Aylwin Azócar | George H. W. Bush | |
| August 3, 1994 | August 11, 1994 | John Biehl | | Eduardo Frei Ruiz-Tagle | Bill Clinton | |
| September 17, 1998 | October 27, 1998 | Genaro Arriagada | | Eduardo Frei Ruiz-Tagle | Bill Clinton | |
| September 9, 1999 | November 29, 1999 | Mario Artaza | | Eduardo Frei Ruiz-Tagle | Bill Clinton | |
| June 9, 2000 | September 5, 2000 | Andrés Bianchi | | Ricardo Lagos Escobar | Bill Clinton | 2006 |
| January 1, 2006 | | Mariano Fernández | | Michelle Bachelet | George W. Bush | April 20, 2009 |
| April 20, 2009 | May 2010 | José Goñi | | Michelle Bachelet | Barack Obama | |
| June 21, 2010 | June 28, 2010 | Arturo Fermandois | | Sebastián Piñera | Barack Obama | |
| April 25, 2012 | May 2, 2012 | Felipe Bulnes | | Sebastián Piñera | Barack Obama | |
| May 14, 2014 | May 21, 2014 | Juan Gabriel Valdés Soublette | | Michelle Bachelet | Barack Obama | |
| | | Julio Pedro Fiol Zuniga | Chargé d'affaires | Michelle Bachelet | Barack Obama | |
| August 10, 2018 | | Alfonso Silva Navarro [es] | | Sebastián Piñera | Donald Trump | |
| April 22, 2022 | | Juan Gabriel Valdés Soublette | | Gabriel Boric | Joe Biden | |
| April 15, 2026 | May 21, 2026 | Andrés Ergas Heymann | | José Antonio Kast | Donald Trump | |

|}
