= United Liberal Party =

United Liberal Party may refer to:

- United Liberal Party (Chile)
- United Liberal Party (Victoria)
- United Liberal Party (Zambia)
