= Conrado Ríos =

Chilean politician (1896–1983)

Conrado Ríos Gallardo
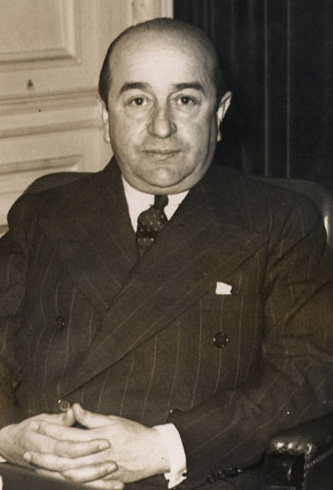

Ambassador of Chile to Argentina
- In office 1953–1956
- President: Carlos Ibáñez del Campo
- Preceded by: Germán Vergara
- Succeeded by: Fernando Aldunate
- In office 1939–1944
- President: Pedro Aguirre Cerda; Juan Antonio Ríos
- Preceded by: Luis Barros
- Succeeded by: Alfonso Quintana

Ambassador of Chile to Peru
- In office 1929–1930
- President: Carlos Ibáñez del Campo
- Preceded by: Emiliano Figueroa
- Succeeded by: Manuel Rivas

Minister of the Interior Interim
- In office August 24, 1929 – August 30, 1929
- President: Carlos Ibáñez del Campo
- Preceded by: Guillermo Edwards
- Succeeded by: Enrique Bermúdez

Minister of Social Welfare
- In office February 29, 1928 – March 5, 1928
- President: Carlos Ibáñez del Campo
- Preceded by: Enrique Balmaceda
- Succeeded by: Enrique Balmaceda

Minister of Development
- In office February 29, 1928 – March 5, 1928
- President: Carlos Ibáñez del Campo
- Preceded by: Adolfo Ibáñez
- Succeeded by: Luis Schmidt

Minister of Foreign Affairs
- In office February 9, 1927 – August 31, 1929
- President: Carlos Ibáñez del Campo
- Preceded by: Jorge Matte
- Succeeded by: Manuel Barros Castañón

Personal details
- Born: 14 May 1896 Santiago, Chile
- Died: 21 July 1983 (aged 87) Santiago, Chile
- Party: Liberal Party
- Spouse: María Izquierdo Phillips
- Children: 1
- Education: University of Chile

Conrado Ríos Gallardo (14 May 1986 — 21 August 1983) was a Chilean journalist, diplomat and politician, member of the Liberal Party (PL). He served as Minister of Foreign Affairs during the first government of President Carlos Ibáñez del Campo, from 1927 to 1929.

He also served as Chile's ambassador to the Republic of Peru between 1929 and 1931 (under the same government); and as Chile's ambassador to the Argentine Republic during the presidencies of the radicals Pedro Aguirre Cerda, Juan Antonio Ríos, and the second administration of Ibáñez del Campo, the latter position between 1953 and 1956.

== Early life ==
He was born in Santiago de Chile on May 14, 1896, son of Conrado Ríos Venegas and Josefina Gallardo Nieto, in addition to having been the nephew of the diplomat and politician Galvarino Gallardo and great-grandson of José Camilo Gallardo, the first Chilean printer and typographer. He completed his primary studies at the National Institute and his secondary studies at the Barros Arana National Boarding School, both in Santiago. He continued his studies at the Faculty of Law of the University of Chile.

In 1948 he married María Izquierdo Phillips, with whom he had a son.

== Career ==
He did not graduate as a lawyer, and instead entered public life as a journalist. He worked since 1918 at the newspaper La Nación, where he was head of codes, later an international commentator and, in 1928, editor-in-chief. Likewise, he was a contributor to the newspapers El Mercurio and El Diario Ilustrado, under the pseudonym Víctor E. Morla. In 1932 he founded the Hoy magazine, together with Aníbal Jara and Carlos Dávila. In the company of the lawyer and politician Ismael Edwards Matte he organized the Ercilla Publishing House.

On February 9, 1927, he was appointed by President Carlos Ibáñez del Campo as head of the Ministry of Foreign Affairs and Commerce, holding the position until August 31, 1929. During his management in charge of the government division, the controversy with Peru over the provinces of Tacna and Arica was put to an end through the Treaty of Lima, he made negotiations between Bolivia and Paraguay in their dispute over the Gran Chaco and served as arbitrator in the issue of pending boundaries between Panama and Costa Rica.

He carried out a process of modernization of the Chancellery, dividing the Ministry in 1927 into two large departments, the Diplomatic and the Economic, and then adding, in 1929, the Consular Department. On the other hand, simultaneously, between March 23 and 26, 1928, he took over as Minister of Social Welfare, in an interim capacity; and between February 29 and March 5, 1928, he took over as Minister of Development, as a substitute. Likewise, between August 24 and 30, 1929, he took over as Minister of the Interior, acting as deputy after the resignation of Guillermo Edwards Matte.

After leaving the cabinet, he was appointed ambassador extraordinary to Spain, on the occasion of the Exposition of Latin American Nations in Seville, and ambassador to Peru until 1930. Later, in the government of President Pedro Aguirre Cerda, in 1939 he was appointed ambassador in Argentina, serving in that diplomatic mission until 1944, two years into the administration of President Juan Antonio Ríos. With the arrival of Carlos Ibáñez del Campo to the presidency of the Republic for the second time, in 1953, he once again served as ambassador to Argentina, until 1956.

Among other activities, he held the position of director of the construction company Sigdo Koppers and president of Impregnadora de Maderas S.A.

== Written works ==
He was the author of a series of books on diplomatic history:

- Después de la paz... Las relaciones chileno-bolivianas (1926).
- Chile y Perú: Los pactos de 1929 (1959).
- Chile y Argentina. Consolidación de sus fronteras (1960).
- Chile y Bolivia definen sus fronteras, 1842–1904 (1963).

== Bibliography ==
- Diccionario Biográfico de Chile (11th ed.). Santiago: Empresa Periodística "Chile"; Talleres Gráficos Periodística Chile Ltda. 1959–1961.
