= Independent Liberal Party (Chile) =

The Independent Liberal Party or Doctrinary (Spanish: Partido Independiente Liberal) was an independent Chilean political party which was formed during Domingo Santa María's presidency by a group of parliament members, known as the doctrinaries, who opposed him. The party began with a manifesto published on 22 October 1885. They were members of some presidential cabinets from 1891 onwards.

Its founders were Miguel Luis Amunategui, Gregorio Víctor Amunategui, Vicente Reyes, Eliodoro Yáñez, Ismael Valdés and José Victorino Lastarria. Its party platform wanted an increase of public liberties, to apply universal suffrage and to establish a real democratic regime.

The ILP could be seen as a tendency in the Liberal Party, it usually shared its candidate lists, but its members used to vote in a different way than the official one. Sometimes, it didn't even share a candidacy with the Liberal Party. Contrarily to the PL, whose members could be from both Liberal Alliance and the Coalition, doctrinary liberals were always members or supporters of the Alliance.

In 1930 it merged into the United Liberal Party. With the downfall of president Carlos Ibáñez (1931) it rearranged as an autonomous organization. During the VI Convention of the Liberal Party, in October 1933 the ILP merged into the LP.

== Resultados electorales ==
Year of election (max number of parliament seats)	1932 (142)
Number of parliament members	2
Votes obtained	5.643
Votes percentage	1,7

== Sources ==
The original version of this article draws heavily on the corresponding article in the Spanish-language Wikipedia, which was accessed in the version of 7 June 2007.

== See also ==
- Liberal Party (Chile, 1849–1966)
- Liberalism and radicalism in Chile
