= Domingo Godoy =

Domingo Godoy may refer to:

- Domingo Godoy Cruz (1847–1916), Chilean politician and diplomat, foreign minister in 1891
- Domingo Godoy Matte (1922–2013), Chilean agronomist and politician
- Domingo Godoy Pérez (fl. 1940s), Chilean politician
