= Beltrán Mathieu =

Chilean politician (1852–1931)

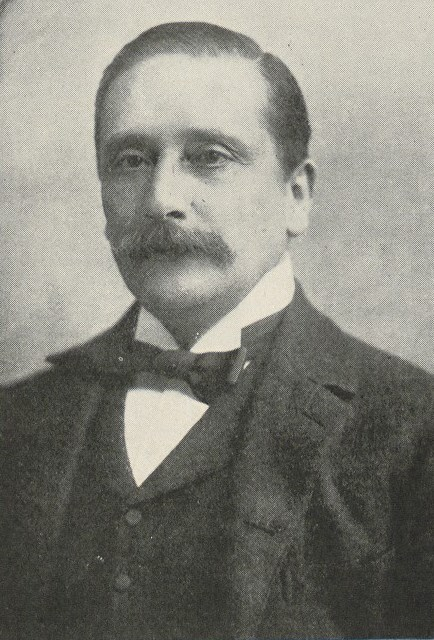

Minister Plenipotentiary of Chile to the United Kingdom
- In office August 1926 – July 1927
- Preceded by: Gustavo Munizaga Varela (As chargé d'affaires)
- Succeeded by: Enrique Villegas (As ambassador)

Minister of Foreign Affairs
- In office February 4, 1926 – August 2, 1926
- Preceded by: Ernesto Barros Jarpa
- Succeeded by: Antonio Huneeus

Minister Plenipotentiary of Chile to the United States
- In office 1915–1923
- Preceded by: Gustavo Munizaga Varela (As chargé d'affaires)
- Succeeded by: Miguel Cruchaga

Minister of Industries, Public Works and Railways
- In office November 23, 1910 – December 23, 1910
- Preceded by: Fidel Muñoz
- Succeeded by: Ismael Valdés

Minister Plenipotentiary of Chile to Bolivia
- In office 1903–1906
- Preceded by: Manuel J. Vega (As chargé d'affaires)
- Succeeded by: Manuel J. Vega

Minister of War and Navy
- In office March 8, 1902 – May 6, 1902
- Preceded by: Wenceslao Bulnes Garmendia
- Succeeded by: Víctor Manuel Lamas
- In office September 18, 1901 – January 31, 1902
- Preceded by: Wenceslao Bulnes Garmendia
- Succeeded by: Rafael Orrego González

Minister Plenipotentiary of Chile to Ecuador
- In office 1896–1900
- Preceded by: Domingo Godoy Cruz (As chargé d'affaires)
- Succeeded by: Domingo Gana Edwards (As chargé d'affaires)

Deputy of the Republic of Chile (Representing La Laja, Nacimiento and Mulchén)
- In office 1891–1897

Deputy of the Republic of Chile (Representing Angol)
- In office 1882–1885

Personal details
- Born: April 10, 1852 Talcahuano, Chile
- Died: May 20, 1931 Paris, France
- Party: Radical Party
- Education: University of Chile

Beltrán Luis Mathieu Andrews (Talcahuano, April 10, 1852 — Paris, May 20, 1931) was a Chilean lawyer, diplomat and politician, member of the Radical Party (PR). He served as a deputy, and Minister of State of his country, during the government of President Emiliano Figueroa Larraín.

== Early life ==
He was born in the Chilean commune of Talcahuano on April 10, 1852, the son of Ramona Andrews Santibáñez and Luis Mathieu Solar, who was mayor of Talcahuano in 1865, 1870–1873 and 1885–1888. He completed his primary and secondary studies in the Liceo de Concepción (former Literary Institute). He continued his higher education in Santiago, studying law at the University of Chile, graduating as a lawyer on November 22, 1875.

He married Josefina Prieto Molina in July 1875, with whom he had five children. He was widowed in 1889, and subsequently married again, in November 1896 with Elena Serrano Squella; without having children.

== Political career ==
In the political sphere, in 1881 he joined the ranks of the Radical Party (PR) of Concepción, and through said community, he joined Freemasonry; He being one of the founders of the Peace and Concord Lodge, of the same city.

He began his public career as secretary of the Army of La Frontera. His boss was the governor of Angol, General Basilio Urrutia. He was elected substitute deputy for Angol, for the period 1882–1885; He joined the property, replacing the elected deputy owner Domingo Gana Cruz, who did not take the oath, having been appointed, on June 6, 1882, envoy extraordinary and minister plenipotentiary of Chile in Mexico and the Central American Republics. Then, on April 26, 1884, he was appointed prosecutor of Angol, which was included in the Agreement of September 27 of the same year, and consequently left this department without representation in the Chamber of Deputies.

On the other hand, in 1882 he was one of the founding partners of the newspaper El Sur from Concepción.

In 1885 he was appointed fiscal promoter of Angol and in 1886, first secretary of the Chilean Legation in Washington, D.C.; He belonged to what was called the "Class of 1886" in the chancellery. He graduated as a lawyer again from Columbia University in 1887. In 1889, he went on to serve as secretary of the Legation in Lima, where his spouse died of tuberculosis; His children were still young.

He returned to Chile and at the end of 1890, he joined the constitutionalist movement that fought against President José Manuel Balmaceda in the civil war of 1891. He left for Iquique and was added to the army as an advisor to General Adolfo Holley, with the rank of captain. Next, in the parliamentary elections of that year, he was elected as deputy for Laja, Nacimiento and Mulchén, for the legislative period 1891–1894. During his administration he was a member of the Permanent Commission on Constitution, Legislation and Justice. He obtained re-election in the parliamentary elections of that year, representing the same area, for the period 1894–1897. On that occasion he continued to be a member of the Permanent Commission of Constitution, Legislation and Justice and also joined the Internal Police Commission.

However, he did not manage to finish his term because he accepted a diplomatic mission in 1896: he was appointed by President Jorge Montt as minister plenipotentiary of Chile in Ecuador and Central America. Consequently, his seat in the lower house was occupied by Julio Fredes Ortíz, who on July 2 of that year joined as his replacement.

Later, during the government of President Germán Riesco, on September 18, 1901, he was appointed Minister of War and Navy, a position he held until January 31, 1902, which he resumed between March 8 and May 6. In the exercise of his functions, between January 30 and 31, 1902, he took over as Minister of Finance, as a substitute. The following year, he was appointed by President Germán Riesco as minister plenipotentiary in La Paz.

On the occasion of the vice presidency of Emiliano Figueroa Larraín, on November 21, 1910, he was appointed by him as Minister of Industries, Public Works and Railways, serving as such until December 23 of the same year.

Later, in 1915, he was appointed minister plenipotentiary in Washington, D.C., where after carrying out several missions, he returned in 1923. Between February 4 and August 2, 1926, he served as Minister of Foreign Affairs, appointed under the presidency of Emiliano Figueroa Larraín.

== Later life and death ==
In 1926 he began to serve as minister plenipotentiary of Chile in the United Kingdom, a position from which he retired in July 1927 and then took up residence in Paris. He died in this city on May 20, 1931, at the age of 79. His remains were repatriated to Chile in 1935, and he was buried in the Talcahuano Cemetery, as was his wish.
