= Barros Luco =

Chilean hot sandwich

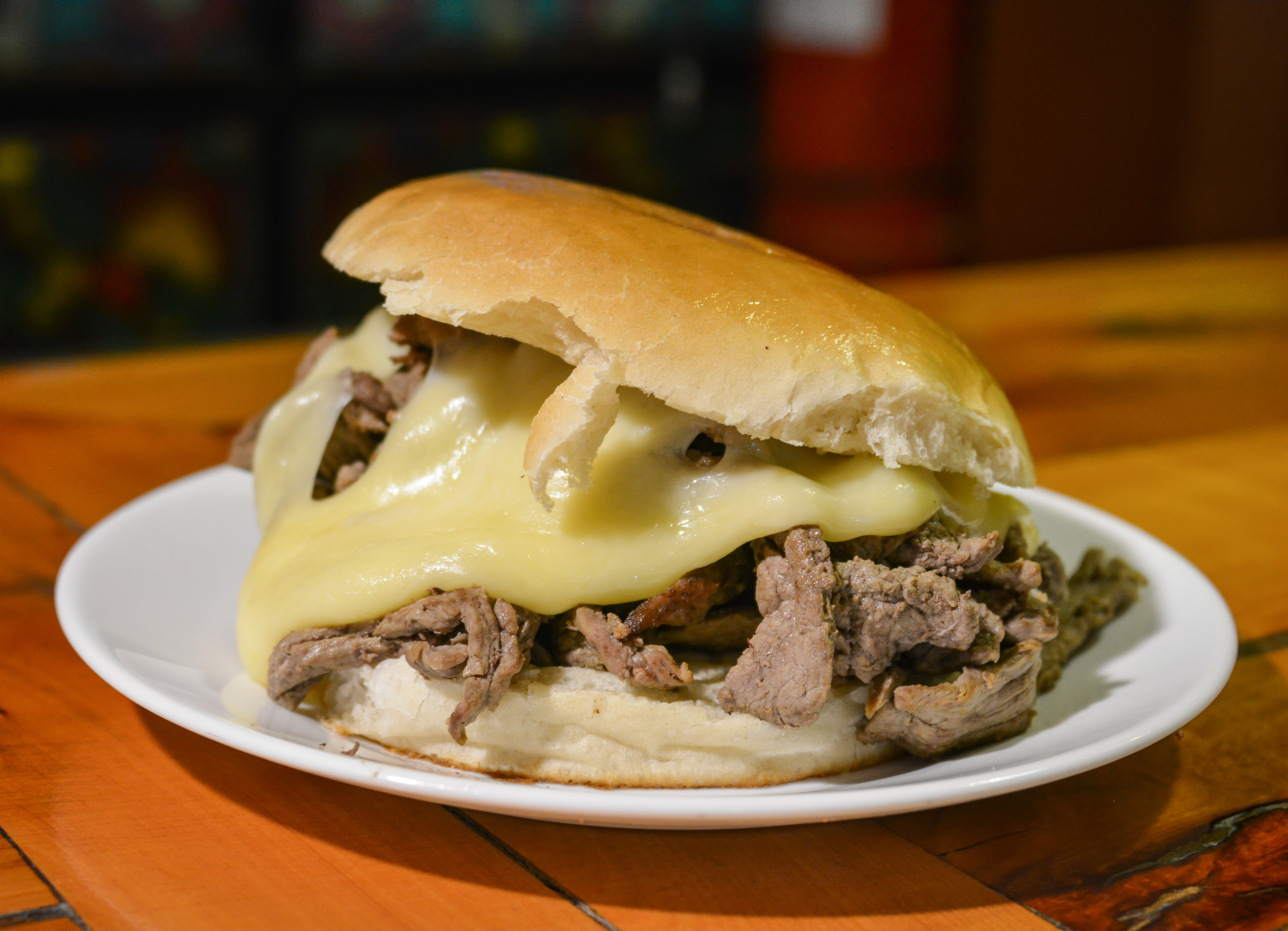
- Type: Sandwich
- Place of origin: Chile
- Main ingredients: Bread, beef, cheese

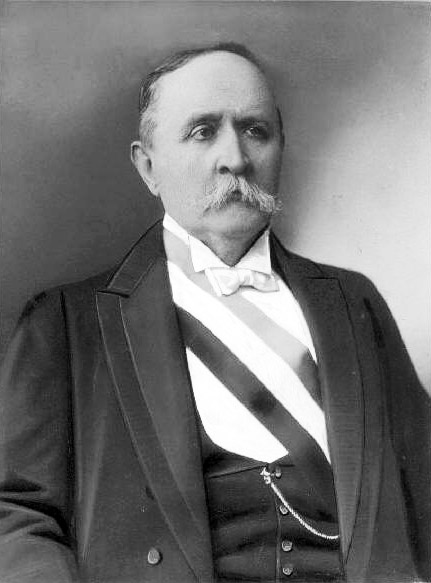
Ramón Barros Luco, after whom the sandwich is named

Barros Luco is a hot sandwich in Chile that includes beef and melted cheese in one of several types of bread. The sandwich is named after Ramón Barros Luco, who served as president of Chile from 1910 to 1915. The sandwich was created in the restaurant of the National Congress of Chile in Santiago, where Barros Luco always asked for this sandwich. Other sources point to Confitería Torres as the place where the sandwich was created.

The president's cousin, Senator Ernesto Barros Jarpa, asked instead for sandwiches with ham and cheese, as he found the beef hard to eat. These sandwiches became known as Barros Jarpa.

== See also ==
- List of sandwiches
- Cheesesteak
