= Marcial Mora =

Chilean politician (1895–1972)

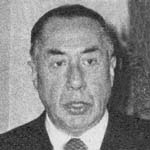

Senator of the Republic of Chile for the 1st Provincial Group, Tarapacá & Antofagasta
- In office 1953 – 1961

Ambassador of Chile to the United States
- In office 1944 – 1946
- President: Juan Antonio Ríos
- Preceded by: Rodolfo Michels Cabero
- Succeeded by: Félix Nieto del Río

Minister of Finance
- In office November 7, 1940 – June 10, 1941
- President: Pedro Aguirre Cerda
- Preceded by: Pedro Enrique Alfonso
- Succeeded by: Guillermo del Pedregal

Minister of Foreign Affairs
- In office July 30, 1940 – November 6, 1940
- President: Pedro Aguirre Cerda
- Preceded by: Cristóbal Sáenz Cerda
- Succeeded by: Manuel Bianchi Gundián

President of the Central Bank of Chile
- In office 1939 – 1940
- Preceded by: Ramón Subercaseaux
- Succeeded by: Enrique Oyarzún Mondaca

Minister of the Interior
- In office September 2, 1931 – April 7, 1932
- President: Juan Esteban Montero
- Preceded by: Horacio Hevia Labbé
- Succeeded by: Víctor Vicente Robles

Deputy of the Republic of Chile for the 15th Dept. Group, San Carlos, Chillán, Bulnes & Yungay
- In office 1926 – 1930

Personal details
- Born: Marcial Mora Miranda; January 12, 1895 Cobquecura, Parliamentary Republic (Chile)
- Died: May 13, 1972 (aged 77) Santiago, Chile
- Party: Radical (c. 1915–1969); Radical Democracy (1969–1972)
- Occupation: Lawyer, professor, politician

Marcial Mora Miranda (12 January 1895 – 13 May 1972) was a Chilean politician, and a minister in the cabinet of Chile in 1930s and 1940s. Mora was the president of Central Bank of Chile from 1939 to 1940 and Ambassador to the United States from 1945 to 1946.

Initially a member of the Radical Party, he served in the Chamber of Deputies from 1926 to 1930 and in the Senate of Chile from 1953 to 1961. He held several cabinet positions, including Minister of the Interior, Minister of Foreign Affairs and Commerce, and Minister of Finance. He was also Chilean ambassador to the United States from 1944 to 1946.

Mora held a number of positions in Chilean public institutions. He served as director of the postal and telegraph service and of the Caja de Amortización. He was president of the Caja Nacional de Ahorros from 1933 to 1939, president of the Central Bank of Chile in 1939, and later president of Banco del Estado de Chile. He also served as a councillor of the Corporación de Fomento de la Producción (CORFO).

Mora received Bolivia's Order of the Condor of the Andes. He died in Santiago on 13 May 1972, aged 77.

== Early life and education ==
Mora was born in Cobquecura on 12 January 1895, the son of Víctor Mora Arenas and Semíramis Miranda Rojas. He attended the Liceo de Chillán and later studied at the Pedagogical Institute of the University of Chile. He qualified as a teacher of history and geography in 1918. He also studied law at the University of Chile and was admitted to legal practice on 14 September 1918. His thesis, Historia del derecho chileno: las leyes marianas, dealt with the history of Chilean law.

On 19 May 1920, he married Elena Wackenhut, with whom he had three children.

Mora initially worked as a history and geography teacher at the Liceo de Chillán. He was also active in journalism, serving as director of the Chillán newspaper El Día and later as an editorial secretary at La Nación in Santiago.

He was a member of Chilean Freemasonry, joining the La Montaña No. 50 lodge before the age of 23. He later served as president of the Automóvil Club de Chile and belonged to the Casa del Estudiante Americano and the Sociedad Chileno-Brasilera de Cultura.

== Political career ==
Mora joined the Radical Party and represented the party as vice-president of the University of Chile Students' Federation in 1915.

He was elected to the Chamber of Deputies for the Fifteenth Departmental Constituency of San Carlos, Chillán, Bulnes and Yungay for the 1926–1930 term. In the Chamber, he chaired the Permanent Committee on Internal Government and served on the Permanent Committee on Public Education. He was also a substitute member of the Internal Police Committee and participated in the Special Committee on Water Rights in 1926.

In July 1930, during the presidency of Carlos Ibáñez del Campo, Mora was sent into internal exile in Ancud, Chiloé. His experiences during this period later formed part of his book Una jornada solitaria, published in 1931.

Mora was appointed Minister of the Interior on 2 September 1931 during the vice presidency of Manuel Trucco. He remained in office until 24 February 1932. Under President Juan Esteban Montero, he returned to the ministry on 5 March and served until 7 April 1932.

Under President Pedro Aguirre Cerda, Mora served as Minister of Foreign Affairs and Commerce from 30 July to 6 November 1940. He was subsequently appointed Minister of Finance, holding that office from 7 November 1940 until 10 June 1941.

Following Aguirre Cerda's death in November 1941, Mora became president of the Radical Party and participated in the political coalition that supported Juan Antonio Ríos in the 1942 Chilean presidential election. During this period, he also founded the Unión para la Victoria, an organization opposed to Nazism and supportive of breaking Chilean relations with the Axis powers.

=== Diplomatic career ===
Mora served as Chilean ambassador to the United States from 1944 to 1946 during the presidency of Juan Antonio Ríos. On 12 December 1944, while serving as ambassador, he participated in the establishment of diplomatic and consular relations between Chile and the Soviet Union.

Antarctic affairs formed an important part of Mora's diplomatic and political activities. During his tenure as foreign minister, President Aguirre Cerda issued the decree of 6 November 1940 defining the boundaries claimed by Chile in Antarctica. Mora later participated in the Washington conference associated with the Antarctic Treaty, signed in December 1959, and attended the first two Antarctic Treaty Consultative Meetings, held in Australia and Argentina.

He also served as a member of the Chilean delegation to the United Nations.

=== Later career ===
Mora returned to Congress after being elected to the Senate of Chile for the First Provincial Grouping of Tarapacá and Antofagasta for the 1953–1961 term. He served on the Permanent Committee on Public Education and as a substitute member of committees dealing with foreign affairs and commerce; constitutional affairs, legislation and justice; finance and budgets; and national defense. In 1955, he participated in the Joint Committee for the Study of the New Regulatory System for the Nitrate Industry.

During his senatorial term, Mora participated in the consideration of Law No. 11,846 of 21 June 1955, which incorporated the territory claimed by Chile in Antarctica into Magallanes Province. He was also a member of the Inter-Parliamentary Union and the Pan-American Regional Group.

In 1958, while serving as senator, Mora was again elected president of the Radical Party. He left the party in 1969 and joined other politicians in establishing Radical Democracy, subsequently serving on the new party's supreme tribunal.

== Works ==
- Historia del derecho chileno: las leyes marianas (1917), his university thesis.
- Una jornada solitaria: discursos, vida parlamentaria, artículos (1931).
