= Juan Gabriel Valdés =

Chilean political scientist, diplomat and minister

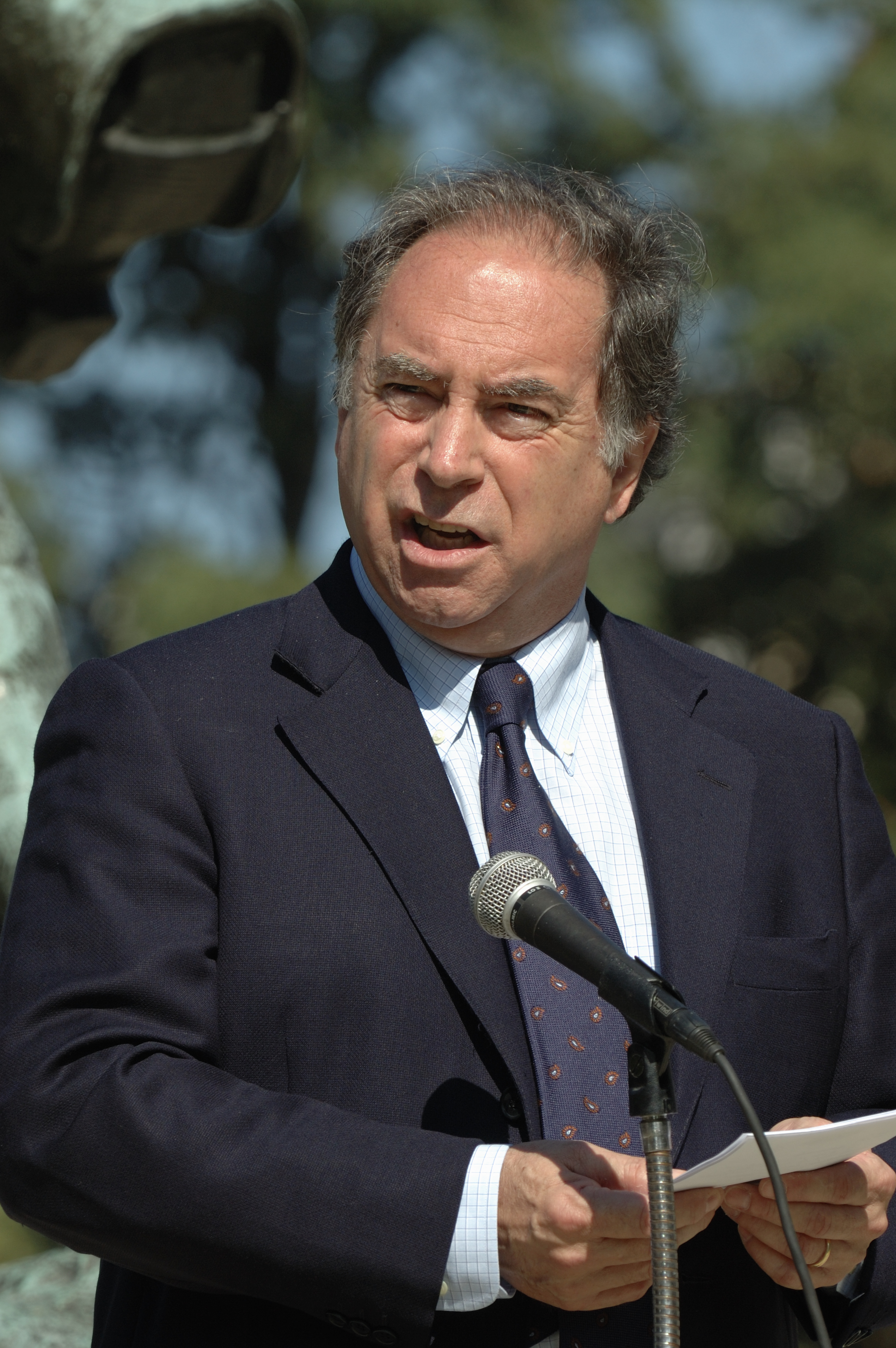

Chilean Ambassador to the United States
- In office 23 April 2022 – 15 April 2026
- Appointed by: Gabriel Boric
- Preceded by: Alfonso Silva Navarro
- Succeeded by: Andrés Ergas
- In office 21 May 2014 – 11 March 2018
- Appointed by: Michelle Bachelet
- Preceded by: Felipe Bulnes
- Succeeded by: Alfonso Silva Navarro

13th Permanent Representative of Chile to the United Nations
- In office 2000–2003
- President: Ricardo Lagos
- Preceded by: Juan Somavía
- Succeeded by: Heraldo Muñoz

Minister of Foreign Affairs
- In office 22 June 1999 – 11 March 2000
- President: Eduardo Frei Ruíz-Tagle
- Preceded by: José Miguel Insulza
- Succeeded by: Soledad Alvear

Personal details
- Born: Juan Gabriel Valdés Soublette; 2 June 1947 (age 79) Santiago, Chile
- Parent: Gabriel Valdés (father)
- Education: Pontifical Catholic University of Chile (LL.B); Essex University (M.D); Princeton University (PhD)
- Occupation: Political scientist

Juan Gabriel Valdés Soublette (Santiago, June 2, 1947) is a Chilean political scientist, diplomat and former minister during the Eduardo Frei Ruiz-Tagle presidency. Between 1973 and 1976 he studied political science at Princeton University in the United States, where he obtained a Ph.D.

In 2014, Chilean president Michelle Bachelet appointed Valdés as Chilean ambassador to the United States.

From 2000 to 2003, Valdes was Chile's Ambassador to the United Nations.

He is the son of composer Sylvia Soublette and Gabriel Valdes, who also served as a Chilean diplomat.

== Early life ==
Valdés is the son of Gabriel Valdés Subercaseaux and Sylvia Soublette. He studied law at the Pontifical Catholic University of Chile. Between 1970 and 1973, he pursued political science at the University of Essex in England, earning a Master of Arts degree in Latin American Studies. From 1973 to 1976, he undertook doctoral studies in political science at Princeton University in the United States, where he received his Ph.D..

In 1976, Valdés worked at the Institute for Policy Studies in Washington, D.C. as a research assistant to former Chilean foreign minister Orlando Letelier. Following Letelier's assassination that same year, he left the United States and settled in Mexico, where he became active in the Chilean exile community and, together with Juan Somavía, co-founded the Institute for Transnational Studies (ILET). During this period, he also taught international relations at the Center for Research and Teaching in Economics (CIDE).

After returning to Chile in 1982, he directed the Chilean branch of ILET, publishing numerous studies on foreign relations and globalization.

In 1986 and 1987, he was a visiting scholar at the University of Notre Dame, Indiana University, and Princeton University, where he completed his doctoral dissertation on the influence of the University of Chicago in Chile. The dissertation was first published in Buenos Aires and later by Cambridge University Press under the title Pinochet's Economists: The Chicago School in Chile.

In 2025, the Academy of Christian Humanism University awarded him an honorary doctorate.

== Political career ==
=== Opposition to Pinochet ===
Beginning in the early 1980s, Valdés participated in Socialist Convergence, the political movement that brought together his original party, the MAPU, with the Socialist Party of Chile.

He served on the editorial boards of the magazines Análisis and APSI. During the 1988 Chilean national plebiscite, he played a leading role in the No campaign, jointly directing its television campaign with Patricio Silva Echenique.

=== Return to democracy ===
During the administration of President Patricio Aylwin, Valdés was appointed Ambassador of Chile to Spain. Upon his return to Chile, he became head of the International Affairs Division of the Ministry of Finance, where he led Chile's trade negotiations with Canada and initiated negotiations for Chile's accession to the proposed Free Trade Area of the Americas.

During the presidency of Eduardo Frei Ruiz-Tagle, he served as Director General of International Economic Relations at the Ministry of Foreign Affairs from October 1996 to July 1999, before being appointed Minister of Foreign Affairs. His tenure was dominated by the arrest of Augusto Pinochet in London. Like his predecessor, José Miguel Insulza, Valdés argued that Chile retained criminal jurisdiction over Pinochet and that he should therefore be tried only in Chile. The British Home Secretary, Jack Straw, ultimately ordered Pinochet's release on humanitarian grounds on 2 March 2000.

During the administration of Ricardo Lagos, Valdés was appointed Permanent Representative of Chile to the United Nations. In 2003, while serving on the United Nations Security Council, he represented Chile's opposition to the resolution authorizing military action against Iraq. Later that year, he was appointed Ambassador of Chile to Argentina.

In August 2004, he accepted appointment by the Secretary-General of the United Nations as head of the United Nations Stabilisation Mission in Haiti (MINUSTAH), a position he held until June 2006, following the 2006 Haitian presidential election.

He subsequently directed the Chile Country Brand Project and the Image of Chile Foundation, a government agency reporting directly to the Presidency of the Republic.

In September 2008, he was appointed head of the Union of South American Nations (UNASUR) commission established to support Bolivia.

Following the 2010 Haiti earthquake, President Michelle Bachelet appointed him presidential delegate to coordinate Chile's humanitarian assistance to Haiti.

In 2013, Valdés unsuccessfully sought his party's nomination for a Senate seat representing the Los Ríos Region, losing the party primary to Alfonso de Urresti.

In 2014, President Michelle Bachelet appointed him Ambassador of Chile to the United States during her second administration.

After Bachelet joined the United Nations High-Level Advisory Board on Mediation in 2017, she vacated the position upon becoming United Nations High Commissioner for Human Rights the following year. Valdés succeeded her on the advisory board on 17 January 2019.

In 2022, President Gabriel Boric again appointed Valdés as Ambassador of Chile to the United States.
