= Barros Jarpa (sandwich) =

Chilean hot sandwich

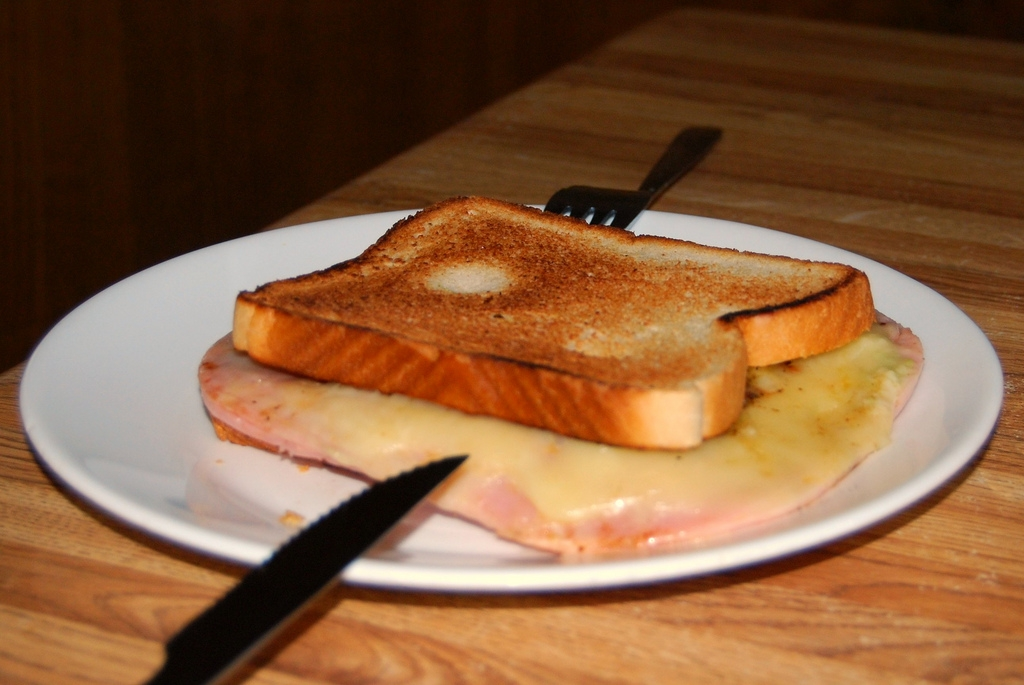
- Place of origin: Chile
- Main ingredients: Bread Ham Cheese

Barros Jarpa is a popular sandwich in Chilean cuisine that includes ham and melted cheese. It is named after the 19th century Chilean Minister Ernesto Barros Jarpa, and was coined in the restaurant of the National Congress of Chile, where Barros Jarpa always asked for this sandwich. It is a derivative of the Barros Luco sandwich.

The minister's cousin, President Ramón Barros Luco, asked for sandwiches with beef and cheese; these sandwiches were called Barros Luco. Barros Jarpa found this combination hard to eat, so he replaced the beef with ham.

== See also ==
- List of sandwiches
