= Sylvia Soublette =

Chilean composer, singer, choirmaster, and educator (1924–2020)

Sylvia Soublette Asmussen (February 5, 1924 – January 29, 2020) was a Chilean composer, singer, choirmaster and educator. She won the 1964 Elizabeth Sprague Coolidge Gold Medal, the 1997 Critics Award from the Valparaíso Art Critics Circle, the 1998 music medal from the National Music Council, and the Pablo Neruda Order of Artistic and Cultural Merit, which was awarded posthumously. She published and performed under the name Sylvia Soublette.

== Early life and family ==
Soublette was born in Viña del Mar to a musical family. Her brother is the musicologist Gastón Soublette. Their mother, Isabel Asmussen Urrutia, was a singer, and their father, Luis Soublette García-Vidaurre, took them to choral concerts. Their paternal grandmother was composer Rosa García Vidaurre. Sylvia Soublette began singing with her cousins at age 12.

In 1941, while studying at the Colegio de los Sagrados Corazones, she founded the Coro Femenino Viña del Mar. She later founded a male choir at the Pontifical Catholic University of Valparaíso and a mixed one at the same institution in 1945. The next year, she married Gabriel Valdés, who later became Chile's Minister of Foreign Affairs. They had three children (Maximiano, Juan Gabriel and María Gracia) and adopted a fourth (Enrique Bravo, son of their housemaid).

Soublette studied music privately with Alina Piderit and at the Conservatorio Nacional de Música with Federico Heinlein, Clara Oyuela, and Domingo Santa Cruz. She received a scholarship from the French government in 1951 to study at the Paris Conservatory with Darius Milhaud and Olivier Messiaen. After returning to Chile, she studied privately with Juan Orrego Salas.

== Career ==
Soublette taught at university in Valparaíso as well as at the Pontifical Catholic University of Chile in Santiago. She founded the Ancient Music Ensemble in 1960, directing it until the 1973 military coup in Chile. Following the coup, she and her husband traveled first to the United States, then to Venezuela for two years. There, she met Jose Antonio Abreu, who had developed the youth orchestra program of Venezuela. She formed an early music ensemble in Venezuela, the Ars Musicae. After returning to Chile, Soublette established the San Francisco Musical Center for the study of colonial music in 1981. In 1991, she formed the nonprofit Santiago Music Institute. She toured as the director of various groups throughout Europe, Latin America, and the United States.

Soublette said, "I am a composer, but from another time. Not from the 21st century, but from the 20th century. However, at this point in time, what I feel most like is an educator." Her works were recorded commercially by RCA Victor.

== Compositions ==
=== Chamber ===
- Preludes (violin and piano)
- Suite in Three Movements (flute and piano)

=== Orchestra ===
- Prelude and Fugue

=== Piano ===
- Sonatina

=== Theatre ===
- Alicia in the Country of Mirrors (text inspired by Lewis Carroll)
- Le Sicilien (text by Moliere)

=== Vocal ===
- Aquel Pastorcito (four voices; text by Jose M. Peman)
- "Balada" (text by Gabriela Mistral)
- "Cancion de Cuna" (text by Gabriela Mistral)
- Cancion Madre de Copacabana (soprano and three recorders)
- "Del Rosal Vengo" (text by Gil Vicente)
- "Donde Estoy?" (soprano)
- Eva (cantata on text by Carmen Valle)
- Hallazgo (four voices)
- "Liuvia" (text by Juana Ibarbourou)
- Mass (solo voices, choir and orchestra)
- Muy ma Clara que la Luna (soprano and four recorders)
- Stabat Mater Dolorosa
- Suite Pastoril (soprano, tenor, flute, violin and harp)
- Three Choruses for Children
- Three Fables (mixed voices)
- "Unos Ojos Bellos" (text by Josef Valdivielso)

- Hear music by Sylvia Soublette
