= Carlos Balmaceda =

Chilean agricultural engineer, businessman and politician

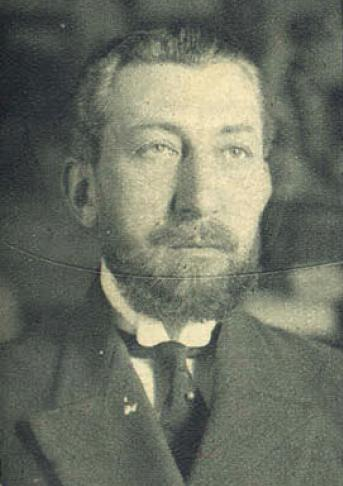

Minister of Foreign Affairs and Trade
- In office 15 November 1931 – 4 June 1932
- President: Juan Esteban Montero
- Preceded by: Luis Izquierdo Fredes
- Succeeded by: Luis Barriga Errázuriz

Minister of Lands and Colonization
- In office 26 July 1931 – 14 August 1931
- President: Carlos Ibáñez del Campo
- Preceded by: Oscar Fenner
- Succeeded by: Carlos Alberto Martínez

Personal details
- Born: April 8, 1879 Santiago, Chile
- Died: August 21, 1958 (aged 79) Santiago, Chile
- Party: Liberal Democratic Party (Chile, 1893)
- Education: University of Chile
- Occupation: Agricultural engineer and politician

Carlos Balmaceda Saavedra (April 8, 1879, Santiago, Chile – August 21, 1958) was a Chilean agricultural engineer, businessman and politician, member of the Liberal Democratic Party. He served as a congressman during the 1900s and 1910s, as well as Minister of State under the governments of Presidents Pedro Montt, Carlos Ibáñez del Campo and Juan Esteban Montero.

== Biography ==
Born in Santiago de Chile on April 8, 1879, son of José María Balmaceda Fernández and Amelia Saavedra Rivera, he was the nephew of President José Manuel Balmaceda. He attended primary and secondary school at the Colegio Inglés and the Instituto Nacional. He later graduated as an agricultural engineer from the University de Chile.

He married María Lazcano Valdés, with whom he had four children.

== Political career ==
He was a member and president of the Liberal Democratic Party. In 1909, Balmaceda was elected to the Chamber of Deputies for the Liberal Democratic Party. He remained a member of the lower house until 1921. From 1912 to 1916, he held the position of President of the Chamber of Deputies.

On June 25, 1910, President Pedro Montt Montt appointed the 31-year-old Balmaceda as the Minister of Finance. He held this position for a few months, from June 25 to December 23, 1910.

In 1931, Carlos Balmaceda served as the Minister of Foreign Affairs and Trade from July 26 to September 2, 1931, and as the Minister of Land and Colonization from July 16 to August 14, 1931. From November 15, 1931, to June 4, 1932, he once again held the position of Minister of Foreign Affairs and Trade.

Among other activities, he was a member of the Society for Industrial Development (Sofofa), the Club de La Unión, the Club Hípico de Santiago, and the Club de Viña del Mar.

He died in Santiago, Chile, on August 21, 1958.

== See also ==
- Balmaceda family
