= Eduardo Opazo Letelier =

Chilean politician

Member of the Senate
- In office 29 June 1922 – 11 September 1924
- Preceded by: Jorge Errázuriz Tagle
- Parliamentary group: Conservative Commission, Treasury and Municipal Loans Commission

Member of Chamber of Deputies

Assembly Member for Curepto and Lontué
- In office 1915-1918; 1918-1921; 1921-1924
- Parliamentary group: Legislation and Justice Commission, Treasury Commission

Personal details
- Born: July 20, 1865 Talca, Chile
- Died: October 26, 1925 (aged 60) Santiago, Chile
- Party: Liberal Party
- Relations: Pedro Opaso Letelier (Brother); Pedro Opaso Cousiño (Nephew); Rodolfo Opazo(Uncle)
- Education: University of Chile; College of the Sacred Hearts of Santiago

Eduardo Opazo Letelier (Talca, July 20, 1865 - Santiago, October 26, 1925) was a Chilean lawyer, senator and deputy.

== Family ==
He was the son of Ursicinio Opazo Silva and Margarita Letelier Silva. He is brother of Pedro Opaso Letelier and uncle of Pedro Opaso Cousiño. He was the eldest of ten siblings who were Margarita, Virginia, María Luisa, Julio, Nicolás Ursicinio, Pedro, Víctor and Miguel.

== Deputy ==
Liberal Party activist. Elected Deputy for Curepto and Lontué for three consecutive terms (1915-1924). He was a member of the Legislation and Justice Commission and the Treasury Commission.

== Senator ==
His last term was not completed, he left in 1922 to take a seat in the Senate, replacing Jorge Errázuriz Tagle, representative of Colchagua, who had died in June 1922. In the Senate, he was a member of the Conservative Commission, the Treasury and Municipal Loans Commission.
