= Arturo Ureta Echazarreta =

Chilean politician

Arturo Ureta

Member of the Senate
- In office 1935 – 15 May 1941
- Constituency: 4th Provincial Grouping

Personal details
- Born: 13 May 1876 San Fernando, Chile
- Died: 20 June 1950 (aged 74) Santiago, Chile
- Party: Conservative Party; Traditionalist Conservative Party
- Spouse: Sara Rozas Ariztia
- Alma mater: Pontifical Catholic University of Chile
- Occupation: Lawyer, politician

Arturo Ureta Echazarreta (13 May 1876 – 20 June 1950) was a Chilean lawyer and politician. A member of the Conservative Party and later of the Traditionalist Conservative Party, he served as a senator of the Republic representing Santiago between 1935 and 1941.

== Biography ==
He was born in San Fernando on 13 May 1876, the son of Emeterio Ureta Carvallo and Josefina Echazarreta Pereira. He married Sara Rozas Ariztia in Santiago on 9 June 1901. The couple had nine children: Arturo, Arturo, Jose Luis, Hernan, Francisco Javier, Juan, Santiago, Sara and Maria Josefina.

== Professional career ==
He studied at the Seminary of Santiago and at Colegio San Ignacio. He later entered the Pontifical Catholic University of Chile, where he earned his law degree on 4 May 1899. His thesis was titled Estudio sobre el articulo 16 del Codigo Civil.

He was the owner of the Chinigue estate in Melipilla. In 1900, he worked as a lawyer and secretary of the Council of the State Railways and served as substitute lawyer of the Fiscal Defense Council between 1905 and 1917.

He served as professor of Civil Law at the Pontifical Catholic University of Chile from 1912 to 1938 and later as dean of its Faculty of Law until 1938. He was subsequently named honorary dean of the Faculty of Law and a member of the University Council.

He was a member, counselor and president of the Santiago Bar Association until its reorganization on 15 April 1931. At the time of his death, he was vice president of the Bar Association and had also served as vice president of the General Council of the Bar Association in 1940.

In parallel, he practiced law independently for banks and British commercial institutions.

== Political career ==
He served as Minister of Justice from 8 April to 5 June 1932 in the final cabinet of President Juan Esteban Montero.

He was a member of the Conservative Party and later of the Traditionalist Conservative Party, serving on the Executive Board of the latter.

In 1935, he was elected senator for Santiago to replace Pedro León Ugalde, who had died in office. He took office on 28 October 1935 and served until the end of the 1933–1941 legislative period. He served on the Standing Committee on Government and as alternate member of the Standing Committee on Constitution, Legislation, Justice and Rules.

== Other activities ==
He was a member of the Club de la Union, the Club Hipico and the Club de Vina del Mar. He served as president of the Patronato de Santa Filomena and had been a member since 1892. He was also a member of the Santo Tomas de Aquino Society and of the Juan Enrique Concha Popular University.

== Death ==
He died in Santiago on 20 June 1950.
