= Miguel Schweitzer Walters =

Chilean lawyer and diplomat (1940–2021)

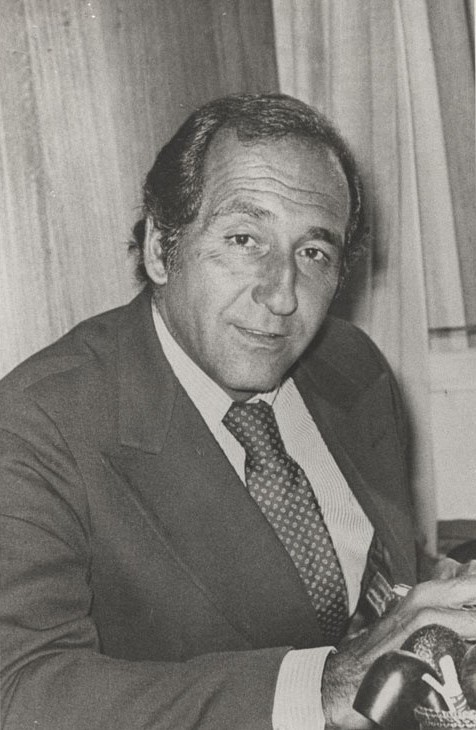

Minister of Foreign Affairs
- In office 14 February 1983 – 19 December 1983
- Preceded by: René Rojas Galdames
- Succeeded by: Jaime del Valle

Ambassador of Chile to the United Kingdom
- In office 1980 – 14 February 1983
- Preceded by: Kaare Olsen
- Succeeded by: Francisco Orrego Vicuña

Personal details
- Born: 22 July 1940 Santiago, Republic of Chile
- Died: 8 May 2021 (aged 80) Santiago, Chile

Miguel Schweitzer Walters (22 July 1940 – 8 May 2021) was a Chilean lawyer and diplomat.

== Biography ==
The son of Miguel Schweitzer Speisky and Cora Walters, Miguel attended the Faculty of Law at the University of Chile and earned a law degree in 1964. He then earned a doctorate in criminal law in Rome. He earned the Premio Montenegro and was awarded most outstanding student in criminal law by the Instituto de Ciencias Penales de Chile. He then started working at the law firm Schweitzer & Cía, where he defended the media company El Mercurio Sociedad Anónima Periodística.

Walters worked as a visiting professor at Stanford University, the University of California, and the University of Pennsylvania from 1969 to 1970. He then became a professor at the University of Chile and Finis Terrae University, where he became Dean of the Faculty of Law in 2003. He represented Chile on the drafting of the Código Penal Tipo para Latinoamérica.

Walters rose to power during the military dictatorship of Augusto Pinochet. He served as Ambassador of Chile to the United Nations and the Organization of American States from 1974 to 1980, and then the United Kingdom from 1980 to 1983. He was instrumental in Chile's backing of the United Kingdom during the Falklands War. He then served as Minister of Foreign Affairs from 14 February to 19 December 1983.

Following the assassination of senator Jaime Guzmán in 1991 Schweitzer became the lawyer off Guzmán's famility. He held that position until being replaced by Luis Hermosilla in 1996.

Miguel Schweitzer Walters died in Santiago on 8 May 2021 at the age of 80.
