= Chilean naval mutiny of 1931 =

Revolt by sailors of the Chilean Navy

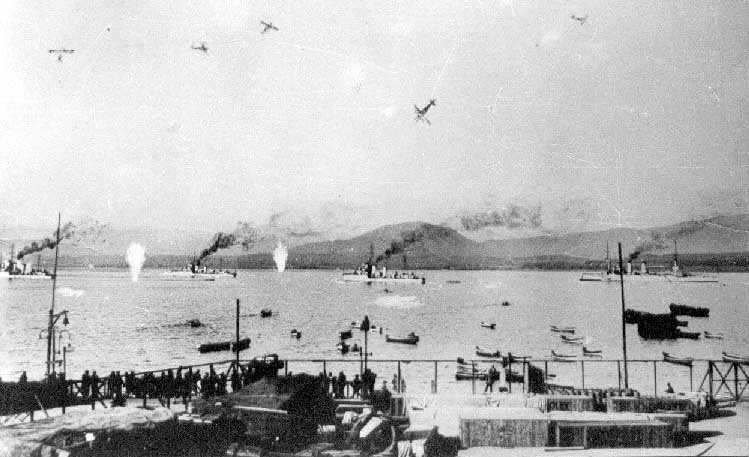
- The Chilean Air Force bombs the Chilean fleet at the port of Coquimbo (probably a propaganda photomontage)
Date	31 August to 7 September 1931
Location	Chile
Result	Chilean government victory

Government-Insurgents
Government of Chile	Chilean Navy rebels

Commanders and leaders
Manuel Trucco; Edgardo Von Schroeders	Carlos Frödden

Political support
All political parties in Chilean Parliament	Communist Party of Chile

Military support
Chilean Army, Chilean Air Force, Carabineros de Chile, Part of Chilean Navy	Part of Chilean Navy

The Chilean naval mutiny of 1931 (Spanish: Sublevación de la Escuadra) was a violent rebellion of Chilean Navy enlisted men against the government of Vice President Manuel Trucco.

== Background ==
In 1931 Chile was bankrupt. The situation had caused the downfall of President Carlos Ibáñez del Campo on 26 July 1931. The collapse of exports and prices for Chilean products, the lack of liquidity and the high level of external debt had led the League of Nations to name Chile as the country most affected worldwide by the Great Depression. There were already 130,000 unemployed and the situation had caused the closing of the saltpeter mines in the Atacama, in turn causing a massive migration of workers to the urban centers.

As part of its attempts to deal with the Great Depression, the government of Vice President Manuel Trucco, who had taken over from President Juan Esteban Montero on 20 August 1931, launched cuts to public spending. At the end of that month the Finance Minister, Pedro Blanquier, notified all public employees, including the members of the armed forces, of a reduction of 30% in their salaries. This reduction was on top of a previous 10% cut that had been inflicted on the armed forces the year before and the loss of all extra bonuses already accrued and owed to them. The military was already suffering from chronic low salaries and these reductions were further aggravated by the loss of purchasing power that the Chilean currency had experienced due to inflation and the general recession of the economy. The discontent was specially strong in the Chilean Navy, where a strict class system was in place, separating the officers from the enlisted men.

== The mutiny ==
On the night of 31 August-1 September 1931, while the fleet was in the port of Coquimbo, the sailors of the Chilean battleship Almirante Latorre mutinied, taking prisoner all the officers of the ship and confining them to their cabins. The insurrection immediately spread to the rest of the fleet in Coquimbo, and all 14 units were soon in the hands of the sailors. The movement was under the leadership of Petty Officer Ernesto Gonzalez, who cabled the government demanding that they rescind the salary reduction and also notifying them that the movement was not a political one.

On 3 September the mutiny spread to the naval base of Talcahuano, where the base personnel, students at the sailors' academy, the coastal artillery and workers of the navy shipyards took over the Southern Fleet, bringing the number of ships in the hands of the insurrection to 26. The sailors put ashore officers and then took to sea to join the rest of the mutineers in Coquimbo. In the meantime, other military units started to join the movement, including the Arica and Maipo Army Regiments, stationed in the cities of La Serena and Valparaíso, respectively.

At this point the demands of the mutineers were increased to include agrarian reform, industrial "solidarity" and the payment of external debt by the "millionaires". Vice President Trucco was extremely alarmed and sent Adm. Edgardo von Schroeders to negotiate, while at the same time preparing the Chilean Army and the Chilean Air Force. At the beginning the negotiations moved quite smoothly, but they soon broke down when the mutineers started to suspect that the government was only interested in buying time while preparing to attack.

After the break in negotiations, the government issued an ultimatum for unconditional surrender. The mutineers answered by declaring a "social revolution" and announcing links with the Worker's Federation and the Communist Party of Chile. Meanwhile the Minister of War, Gen. Carlos Vergara Montero, had massed troops near each of the mutineers' strongholds.

=== Talcahuano attack ===
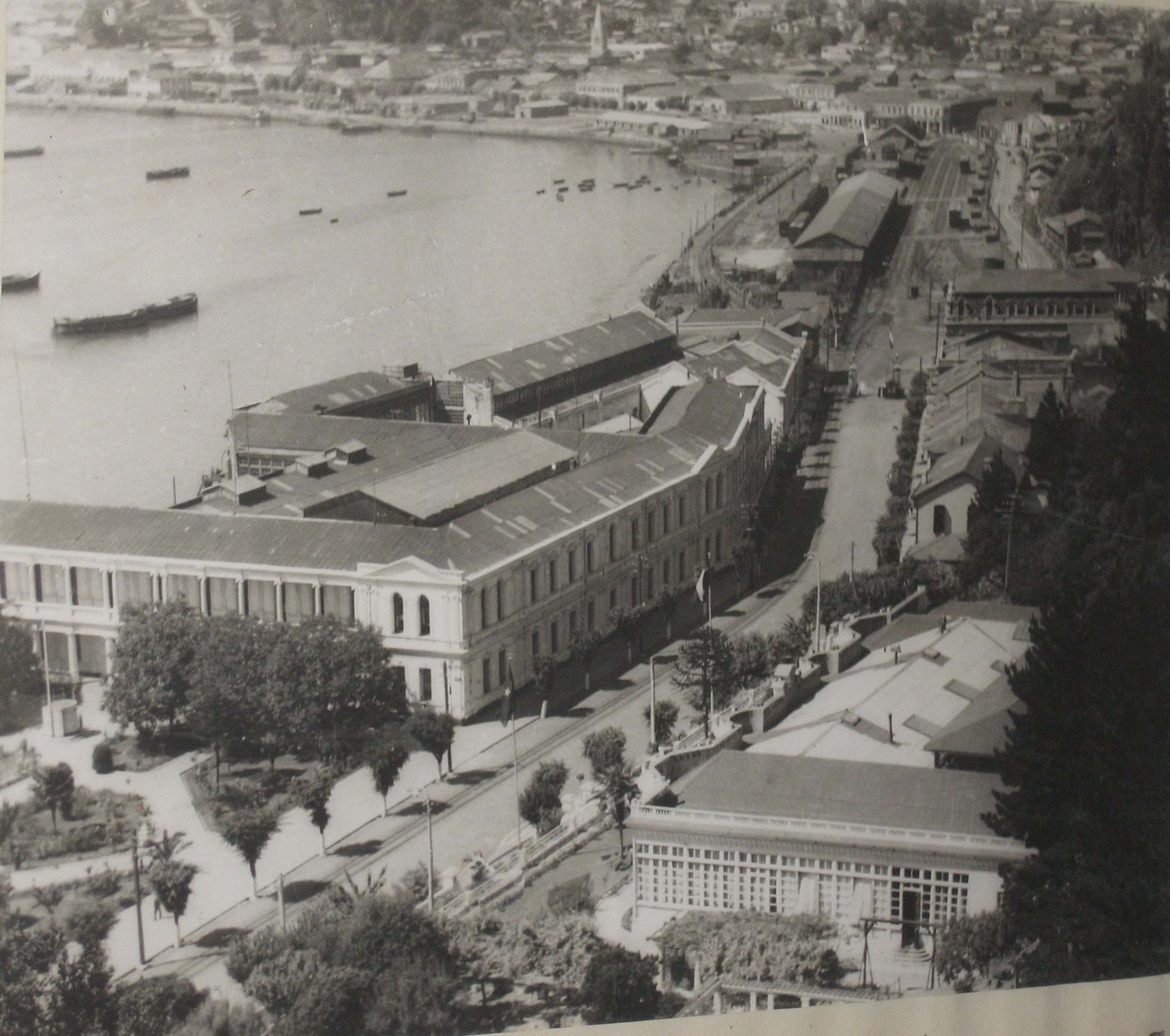
Cuartel de defensa de la costa in Talcahuano, 1935

On 5 September army troops under the command of Gen. Guillermo Novoa attacked the naval base of Talcahuano. These forces were composed of four regiments and an artillery battalion. The attack started at 15:30 when the land artillery started to bombard the Chilean destroyer Riveros at the base. The ship was hit and severely damaged. Eventually she was forced to withdraw to Quiriquina Island to discharge her dead and wounded. After two days of battle, the army captured the naval base on 6 September. The number of dead sailors and soldiers was never revealed, but has been estimated to be significant.

=== Coquimbo bombing ===
Air Commodore Ramón Vergara, Commander-in-chief of the Chilean Air Force and the brother of the Chilean Minister of War, concentrated all his air power in the city of Ovalle, near the port of Coquimbo where the fleet was anchored. There the Air Force fielded two Junkers R-42 heavy bombers, 14 Curtiss Falcon and Vickers Vixen light bombers, two Vickers-Wibault Type 121s and two Ford 5-AT-C transports, modified into light bombers. Their original mission had been to intercept the Southern Fleet to prevent it from joining the rest of the mutineers in Coquimbo. This was considered to be easy to do, since the Southern fleet did not have any antiaircraft guns. However, the Air Force was not able to find the fleet at sea, and it could not prevent the task force from arriving safely.

Since the effectiveness of the Air Force had been placed in question by its earlier failure, Air Commodore Vergara insisted on attacking the fleet. This raid took place on 6 September at 5:00 PM. The plan was to concentrate the bombing over the battleship Almirante Latorre, but the result was only one hit on the submarine Quidora. This resulted in one dead and one wounded. Five planes were hit by fire from the fleet, but they were able to return to their air base, while one Curtiss Falcon was so seriously damaged that it went down over La Serena. Its two pilots survived with only minor injuries.

== Aftermath ==
The combined actions of Talcahuano and Coquimbo seemingly disheartened the mutineers, who decided to end the mutiny. They took the fleet to Valparaíso and surrendered unconditionally to the authorities. The sailors were court-martialed and received sentences ranging from short imprisonment to death sentences.

Further purges in the navy followed. In the end, no sailors were executed, and the mutineers were all pardoned by their commanders one year later, along with the advent of the Socialist Republic of Chile.

== See also ==
- Presidential Republic
- Juan Esteban Montero
- List of Chilean coups d'état

Naval mutinies:

- Invergordon Mutiny
- Kronstadt rebellion
- Wilhelmshaven mutiny
- HNLMS De Zeven Provinciën (1909)#Mutiny in the Indies
- Royal Indian Navy mutiny
- Revolt of the Lash
- Spithead and Nore mutinies

== Sources ==
- The Abortive Kronstadt: The Chilean Naval Mutiny of 1931, William F. Sater, Hispanic American Historical Review, Vol. 60, No. 2 (May, 1980), pp. 239–268.
- Chile: A Brief Naval History, Carlos López Urrutia
- La sublevación de '. escuadra y el períodoo revolucionario 1924–1932, Germán Bravo Valdivieso, Ediciones Altazor, Viña del Mar, 2000, 213 páginas.
- La sublevación de la, 8 escuadra, Liborio Justo, Punto Final, suplemento, Sept. 28, 1971.
- La revolución de la escuadra, Patriciol Manns, UCV, Valparaiso, 1972.
