= Miguel Letelier =

Miguel Letelier may refer to:

- Miguel Letelier Espínola (1883–1965), Chilean engineer and politician
- Miguel Letelier Urrutia (fl. 1930s), Chilean politician
- Miguel Letelier Valdés (1939–2016), Chilean organist and composer, brother of Carmen Luisa Letelier Valdés
