= Manuel Barros Castañón =

Chilean politician

Manuel Barros Castañón was a Chilean politician. He served as minister of foreign affairs of Chile.
