= Ismael Valdés =

Ismael Valdés may refer to:

- Ismael Valdés Valdés (1859–1949), Chilean civil engineer and politician
- Ismael Valdés Vergara (1853–1916), Chilean lawyer and politician

== See also ==
- Ismael Valdéz (born 1973), Mexican baseball player
