= Ernesto Barros Jarpa =

Chilean politician

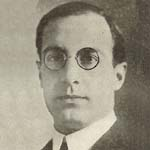

Minister of Foreign Relations
- In office 2 April 1942 – 26 October 1942
- President: Juan Antonio Rios
- Preceded by: Guillermo del Pedregal
- Succeeded by: Joaquín Fernández
- In office 15 October 1925 – 4 February 1926
- President: Emiliano Figueroa Larraín
- Preceded by: Jorge Matte Gormaz
- Succeeded by: Beltrán Mathieu
- In office 16 August 1921 – 29 August 1922
- President: Arturo Alessandri Palma
- Preceded by: Jorge Matte Gormaz
- Succeeded by: Samuel Claro

Personal details
- Born: 7 July 1894 Chillán, Chile
- Died: 15 July 1977 (aged 83) Santiago, Chile
- Resting place: Santiago General Cemetery
- Party: Liberal Party
- Education: University of Chile, 1915
- Occupation: Lawyer; academic; writer; journalist; diplomat; politician

Ernesto Barros Jarpa (7 July 1894 – 15 July 1977) was a Chilean lawyer, academic, writer, journalist, diplomat, politician and member of the Liberal Party. Barros is recognised for his political work during 3 different governmental periods as Minister of Foreign Relations, the last of them during World War II. The Barros Jarpa sandwich is named after him.

== Early life and education ==
Barros was born in Chillán, Chile on 7 July 1894. His parents were José Agustín Barros Merino and Adelaida Jarpa Merino, the daughter of General Juan Manuel Jarpa Caamaño, who served as a Councillor of State during the administration of President Manuel Bulnes.

Barros studied law at the University of Chile, qualifying as a lawyer in 1915 at the age of 21.

== Early career and journalism ==
Barros entered public administration in 1910 as an official at the Central Office of Statistics. In 1913, Barros joined the Ministry of Foreign Affairs, where he later became Undersecretary in 1920, at the age of 26.

Alongside his public service, Barros pursued journalistic activities, focusing primarily on international affairs. Barroes wrote for the La Nación under the pseudonym William Temple in 1917 and later contributed to El Mercurio in 1927.

== Diplomatic career ==
In 1921, Barros acted as Chile's legal representative before the Plebiscitary Commission on Tacna and Arica, in proceedings arbitrated by the President of the United States. On 20 July 1922, Barros secured the signing of the Washington Protocol, and on 12 January 1923, he was appointed legal counsel of Chile before the President of the United States. Barros returned to Chile in May 1924, having also visited Peru, Panama, and Cuba during this period.

That same year, Barros served as Minister Plenipotentiary at the Chilean Embassy in Brazil, headed by Jorge Matte Gormaz, and also undertook official visits to Argentina and Uruguay.

Barros later represented Chile as a delegate to the Eighth Pan-American Conference in Lima in 1938, the Ninth Pan-American Conference in Bogotá in 1948, and presided over the Chilean delegation to the Inter-American Conference held in Quito in 1960. Barros was also a member of the Permanent Court of Arbitration in The Hague from 1938.

== Political career ==
Barros was a member of the Liberal Party, serving as its Secretary General in 1918 and as Vice President in 1922. Within the Liberal Centre, Barros progressed from Pro-Secretary in 1912 to Vice President in 1922.

Barros was elected Deputy for Santiago for the 1924–1927 term and served on the Permanent Committee on Foreign Relations and Worship. Barros' parliamentary mandate was cut short when Congress was dissolved by decree of the Governing Junta on 11 September 1924.

== Ministerial offices ==
At the age of 27, Barros was appointed Minister of Foreign Affairs, Worship, and Colonisation on August 17, 1921, during the administration of President Arturo Alessandri Palma, serving until August 1922. During this tenure, Barros oversaw significant legislation, including the enactment of the Trans-Andean Railway to Uspallata.

Barros returned to the Ministry of Foreign Affairs on 15 October 1925, serving until February 1926 under President Emiliano Figueroa Larraín. Barros was later appointed interim Minister of Finance on 13 September 1932 and Minister of the Interior on 14 September 1932.

In March 1942, Barros was reported to have accepted an appointment as Minister of Foreign Affairs in the incoming administration of President Juan Antonio Ríos. At the time, Barros was a professor of public international law at the University of Chile and had previously served briefly as foreign minister. Contemporary reports noted that Barros had taken relatively limited part in partisan political activity compared with other public figures of the period.

== Academic and professional activities ==
In addition to his political and diplomatic career, Barros was a professor of Public International Law at the University of Chile and published academic writings related to his field. Barros also taught foreign policy at the Academy of the High Command of the National Defence Forces between 1953 and 1955.

During the late 1930s and early 1940s, Barros served as president of the Chile-American Cultural Institute, an organisation dedicated to promoting cultural and educational exchange between Chile and the United States. In that role, Barros supported programs of public lectures and English-language instruction aimed at strengthening bilateral relations.

Barros served as legal adviser to the Amortisation Fund in 1936 and as a substitute justice of the Supreme Court of Chile during the periods 1944 – 1947 and 1956. In 1956, Barros became a full member of the Chilean Academy of History and later joined the Faculty of Legal and Social Sciences of the University of Chile in 1966.

== Business and institutional roles ==
Barros held leadership roles in several major institutions. Barros served as president of the Commercial Telegraph Company, the Mortgage Credit Bank (1932), the Chilean Electric Company, the Chilean Telephone Company, and the Central Chamber of Commerce of Chile from 1950 to 1954. Barros was also a director of the Hospital Facilities Construction Company and Vice President of the Central Chamber of Commerce.

Barros was a member of various international and social organisations, including the American Association of International Law, the Academy of Sciences and Letters of Naples, and several clubs in Chile and the United States.

== Personal life ==
Barros was married Sara Vergara Zañartu, with whom he had three daughters.

Jarpa died in Santiago on 15 July 1977.

== Honours and recognition ==
Throughout his political career, Barros received numerous decorations, including the Grand Cross of the Order of the Crown of Italy, the Grand Cross of the Order of the Liberator of Venezuela, and the Cuban Red Cross, among other distinctions.

A sandwich known as the Barros Jarpa, consisting of ham and melted cheese, is named in Barros' honour and remains popular in Chilean cuisine.
