= René Rojas Galdames =

Chilean lawyer and diplomat

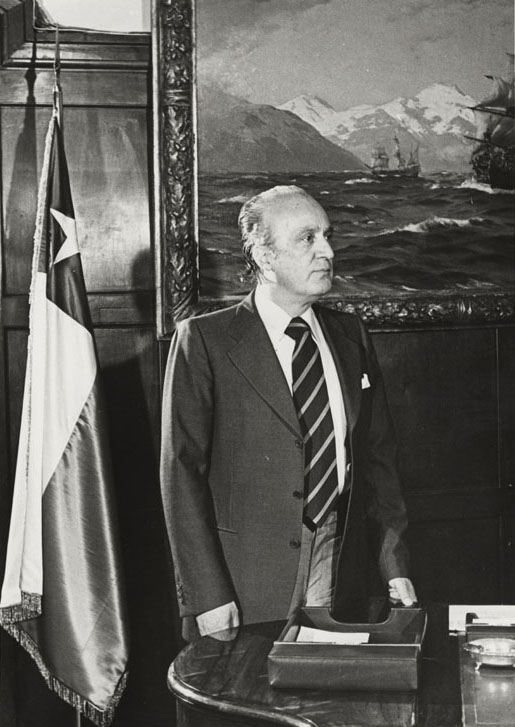

Minister of International Relations, Chile
- In office March 29, 1980 – February 14, 1983
- President: Augusto Pinochet Ugarte
- Preceded by: Hernán Cubillos
- Succeeded by: Miguel Schweitzer Walters
- Constituency: Chile

Personal details
- Born: January 22, 1919 Chile, Chile
- Died: October 22, 1988 (aged 69) Chile Santiago, Chile
- Spouse: Margarita Callejas Zamora
- Occupation: Lawyer

René Rojas Galdames (January 22, 1919 – October 22, 1988) was a Chilean lawyer and diplomat. He was born on January 22, 1919, and died on October 22, 1988. He married Margarita Zamora Callejas with whom he had 8 children.

== Education and career ==
Rojas Galdames served as Attorney General and as secretary to the President of the Republic. He entered the diplomatic service in 1946 and in 1950 obtained a Master in Public Administration degree at the Woodrow Wilson School of Public and International Affairs at Princeton University.

He was a founding member of the Third Company of the La Cisterna Fire Department of (May 21, 1943).

=== Diplomatic career ===
During his diplomatic career Rojas Galdames served as secretary to the embassies of Chile in Argentina (1951), Turkey (1953), Colombia (1954), UK (1956-1961) and as Counselor at the Embassy of Chile in Italy (1962-1967).

He was Director of Protocol in the Ministry of Foreign Affairs.

Between 1970 and 1973 he was Chile's ambassador to the Vatican and between 1973 and 1978 was Chile's ambassador to Argentina, and later served as Chile's ambassador to Spain from 1978 to 1980.

He was Minister of Foreign Affairs of Chile in two periods, at very conflicting times in Chile's history, during 1980-1981 and 1982–1983. During the first period he experienced the Beagle crisis and in the second the Falklands War, in which Chile was involved.
