= Mariano Puga Concha =

Chilean priest and human rights activist (1931–2020)

Rev. Mariano Puga
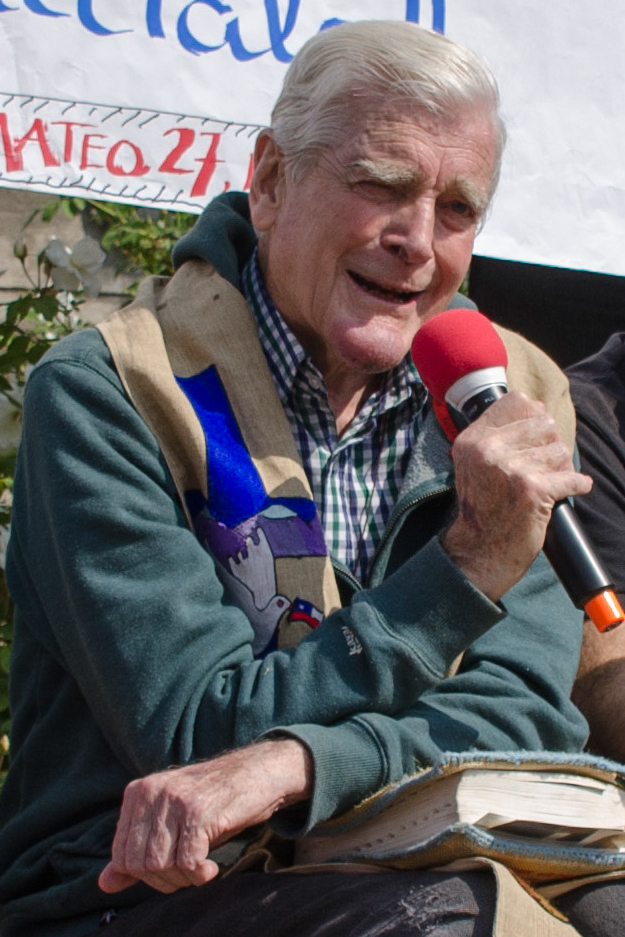
- Puga speaking at a protest at Villa Grimaldi in 2019

Orders
- Ordination: 1959

Personal details
- Born: April 25, 1931 Santiago, Chile
- Died: March 14, 2020 (aged 88) Santiago, Chile
- Denomination: Roman Catholic
- Occupation: priest, human rights activist
- Education: Pontifical Catholic University of Chile

Mariano Puga Concha (25 April 1931 – 14 March 2020) was a Chilean Roman Catholic priest and a human rights activist.

During his life Puga was known as the "worker priest" for his simultaneous work as a clergyman and a construction worker. He was pastor of the university parish of La Legua, aimed at meeting the spiritual needs of students, academics, workers and general population, and a vocal defender of Human Rights during the military dictatorship of that country.

== Early life ==
Puga was born in central Santiago to an aristocratic family and was one of seven brothers. His family's ancestors include Mateo de Toro Zambrano. His father, Mariano Puga Vega, was the former ambassador of Chile to the United States, while his mother, Elena Concha Subercaseaux, was the daughter of Melchor Concha y Toro, founder of the famed Chilean wine brand Concha y Toro.

He completed primary and part of secondary studies in London, where his family had temporarily settled due to his father's application. Upon returning to Chile Puga attended the exclusive The Grange School, and then studied architecture at the Pontifical Catholic University of Chile. While studying architecture in university, Puga and some classmates joined an internship helping the needy in the San Joaquín community, on the banks of the Zanjón de la Aguada in Santiago, where he came into contact with extreme poverty. The experience led Puga to abandon his architecture degree after graduation and to pursue a religious vocation. Puga then entered the Diocesan Seminary, where he was ordained a priest in 1959 and sent to Paris that same year, to study liturgy. From there he continued studies in Italy and Belgium, obtaining the degree of Doctorate in Moral Theology, which allowed him to teach theology at the Pontifical Catholic University of Chile.

== Life under military dictatorship ==
At the end of 1972 he left Santiago and moved to the mining town of Chuquicamata, where he ministered to the miners and workers, and witnessed labor exploitation by the subcontractor companies. The following year a military coup would depose the Socialist president Salvador Allende and Augusto Pinochet assumed the role of dictator of Chile a year later. At the same time Puga's extreme fidelity to the Liberation Gospel and his strong sympathies for Socialism led him to being dismissed from his pastoral role in Chuquicamata by cardinal Raúl Silva Henríquez, who despite having leftist sympathies himself, deemed Puga to be too progressive and outspoken. Multiple times during the dictatorship Puga attempted to enter the National Stadium in Santiago, which was a known detention center where political prisoners were tortured, but he was never allowed inside.

In June 1974 Puga was arrested while preaching and taken to infamous prisons of Villa Grimaldi and Tres Álamos, the experience he would later attest as the worst of the seven imprisonments he was subjected to, during the dictatorship due to the physical and psychological torture the prisoners endured. Many conservative Catholics refused to associate themselves with Puga, resulting in him working part-time as a painter for churches, schools, and hardware stores, in order to sustain himself financially while maintaining his activism.

In the 1980s Puga managed to attain a private audience with Pinochet, where he reportedly confronted him on the human rights abuses committed by his regime, saying "I have seen tortured victims, missing people, and searches and seizures, general. If I keep my mouth shut on that, Jesus will turn his back on me." Soon after Puga was briefly exiled to Peru where he remained for a couple of months. When Pope John Paul II visited Chile in 1987, Puga met with him after an appearance at O'Higgins Park, urging the Pope to do more to bring attention to the situation of the Chilean people.

== Death ==
Puga died on 14 March 2020 after a lengthy battle with lymphatic cancer.
