= Diplomatic Academy of Chile =

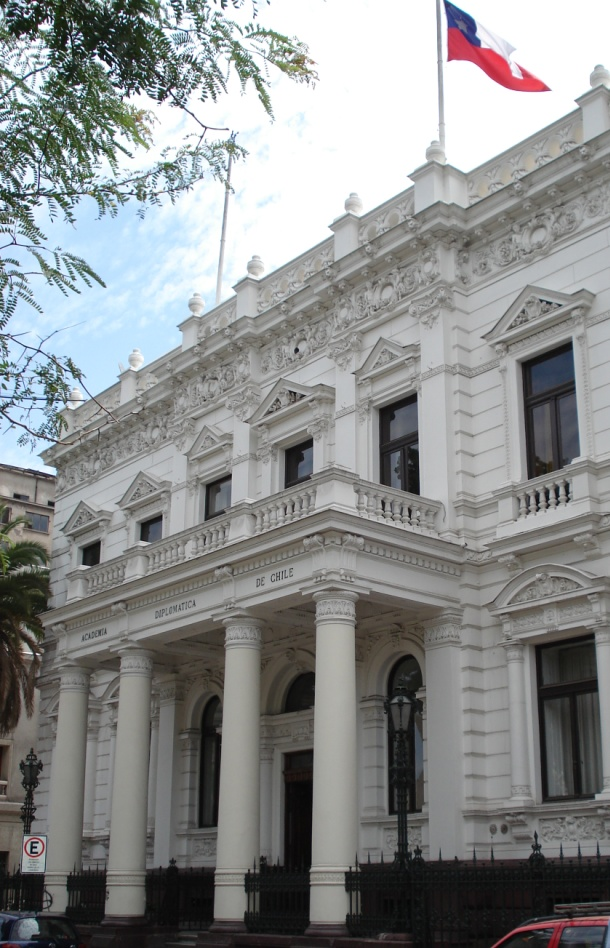
- Type: Academy
- Established: 3 June 1954 (72 years ago)
- Location: Chile
- Campus: Moneda 1096, Santiago

Academia Diplomática Andrés Bello (ADAB) of Chile is the institution responsible for training Chile's future diplomats and has also contributed to the preparation of diplomats from South America, Central America, the Caribbean, Europe, Asia, Africa, and Oceania. It is one of the oldest Academy on the American continent.

== History ==
The Diplomatic Academy was established on June 3, 1954, by Decree of and bears the name of Andrés Bello, in memory of the illustrious Venezuelan-Chilean who served as Senior Official of Foreign Relations, equivalent to Undersecretary of Foreign Relations.

In 1963, the academy was established as a formal division of the Ministry of Foreign Affairs and in 1964, under the direction of professor and historian Jaime Eyzaguirre, a profound reform of the study programs was carried out, incorporating subjects such as Diplomatic Practice, Economics, International Organizations.

On March 29, 1974, the Chilean Treasury acquired the September Palace by expropriation, a property located at Calle Catedral No. of the Ministry of Lands and Colonization, currently the Ministry of National Assets, assigned the Edwards Palace to the Ministry of Foreign Affairs, designating it as the headquarters of the "Andrés Bello" Diplomatic Academy of Chile. The building houses the Ministry Library, Pinacoteca, Mapoteca, language laboratory, reception rooms, and an auditorium for ceremonies or events.

In addition to teaching classes, seminars and conferences are held for students, international meetings, negotiations, official commitments, and activities typical of diplomatic functions.

== Directors ==
- Alberto Sepúlveda Contreras (1954)
- Hernán Cuevas Irarrázabal (1954–1955)
- Jaime Eyzaguirre Gutiérrez (1959–1960)
- Mariano Bustos Lagos (1961)
- Jaime Eyzaguirre Gutiérrez (1962–1965)
- Edmundo Vargas Carreño (1966–1968)
- Eduardo Palma Carvajal (1969–1970)
- Juan Somavía Altamirano (1969–1970)
- José Miguel Insulza Salinas (1972–1973)
- Mario Barros van Buren (1974–1975)
- Jorge Berguño Barnes (1981–1984) / (1975)
- Mariano Fontecilla de Santiago Concha (1975–1977)
- Carlos Derpsch Bartsch (1977–1980)
- Enrique Carvallo Díaz (1984–1986)
- Fernando Zegers Santa Cruz (1986–1990)
- Óscar Pinochet de la Barra (1990–1991)
- Ramón Huidobro Domínguez (1992–1995)
- Eduardo Ortiz Romero (1995–2000)
- Carlos Portales Cifuentes (2000–2001)
- Rolando Stein Brygin (2001–2006)
- Pedro Barros Urzúa (2007–2008)
- Alberto Yoacham Soffia (2008–2009)
- Juan Salazar Sparks (2009–2010)
- Pablo Cabrera Gaete (2010–2014)
- Juan Somavía Altamirano (2014–2017)
- Miguel Ángel González (2018–actualidad)
