= Manuel Trucco =

Chilean politician

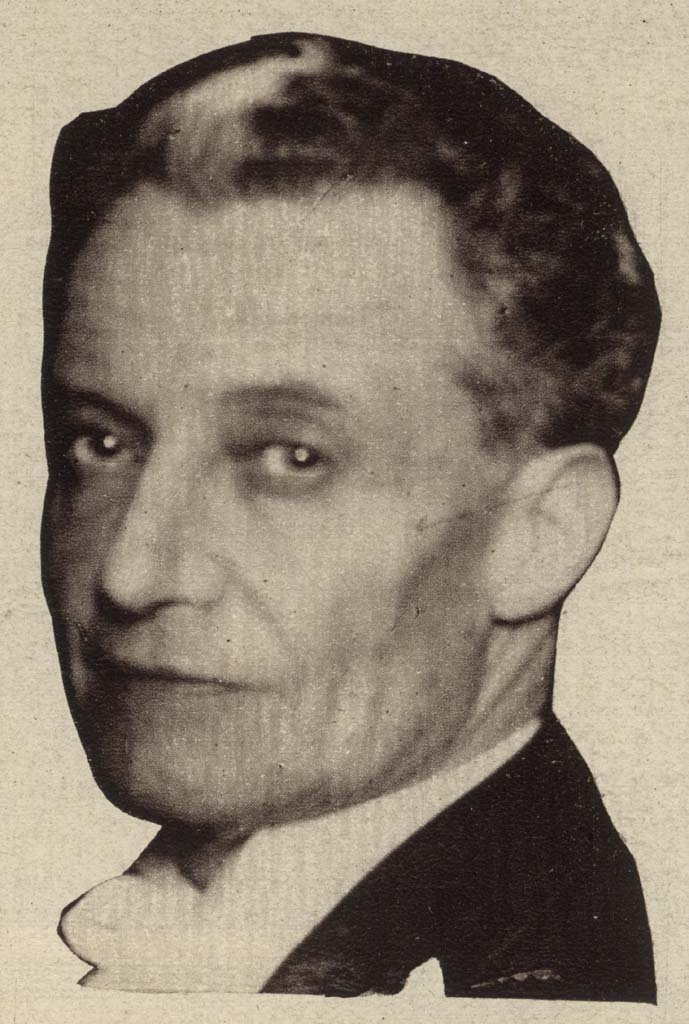

President of Chile
- Interim
- In office August 20, 1931 – November 15, 1931
- Preceded by: Juan Esteban Montero
- Succeeded by: Juan Esteban Montero

Personal details
- Born: March 18, 1875 Cauquenes, Chile
- Died: October 25, 1954 (aged 79) Santiago, Chile
- Spouse: Laura Gaete Fagalde

Manuel Trucco Franzani (March 18, 1875 – October 25, 1954) was a Chilean politician and provisional vice president of Chile in 1931.

== Early life ==
He was born in Cauquenes, the son of Napoleón Trucco Morano and of María Franzani Monigette. He completed his studies in his native city, and at the Instituto Nacional. Trucco then attended the Universidad de Chile, where he became a civil engineer in 1899.

Between 1891 and 1902, while still a student at the university, he started to work at the Liceo de Cauquenes to complement his income, first as the secretary to the principal and then as a teacher of mathematics. After his graduation he became an engineer at the Direction of Public Works and at the State Railroads. The government granted him a scholarship to complete his graduate studies at L’Ecole des Ponts et Chaussées in París between 1902 and 1904.

He married Laura Gaete Fagalde, and together they had four children: Marta, Graciela, Rebeca and Manuel.

At his return, he became a professor of the resistance of materials at the school of architecture of the Universidad de Chile, while continuing his work at the State Railroads, where he designed several railroad bridges (such as the Claro, near Yumbel, the Perquilauquén near Quella, and the viaduct of Las Cucharas in the Santiago-Valparaíso track.)

In 1911, he became dean of mathematics at the university, and in 1917, also became director of the schools of engineering and architecture. In 1918, Trucco resigned from all his positions at the university in order to dedicate himself to his work as general director of railroads, a position he held until 1924.

== Political career ==
Trucco joined the Radical Party and in 1926 became its president, but resigned shortly afterwards due to his poor health. The same year he was elected senator for "Arauco, Malleco and Cautín" (1926–1930). After the resignation of president Carlos Ibáñez del Campo in 1931, his successor, vice-President Juan Esteban Montero named Trucco as Minister of the Interior on August 7, 1931. Very soon after, Montero accepted the presidential nomination for the upcoming elections. Since Montero was constitutionally banned from standing as a candidate while still in office, as a way out of the political impasse, and in order to qualify, he resigned his vice-presidency effective on August 20, 1931. The position was assumed by Manuel Trucco as vice president.

The Trucco administration was only a caretaker one, charged with keeping order in the country until after the presidential elections. Nonetheless it was faced with very difficult moments such as the sailors' mutiny in the navy, caused by the reduction of the salaries of the enlisted men (September 1–5, 1931), which was controlled only after an aerial bombing of the fleet, but which predicted difficult times ahead. He remained as vice president until November 15, when Juan Esteban Montero resumed power after sweeping the election.

President Arturo Alessandri named him ambassador to the United States between 1932 and 1938. At his return, Trucco retired from politics, but in 1946, President Gabriel González Videla appointed him president of the Central Bank of Chile, a position he held until 1951.

Trucco died in Santiago in 1954 at the age of 79.

Political offices
Preceded by Luis Gutiérrez	Minister of the Interior; 1931	Succeeded by Horacio Hevia
Preceded by Juan Esteban Montero	Vice President of Chile; 1931	Succeeded by Juan Esteban Montero
Preceded by Enrique Oyarzún	Governor of Central Bank; 1946 - 1951	Succeeded by Arturo Maschke
