= United Liberal Party (Chile) =

Former liberal Chilean political party (1930-33)

The United Liberal Party (Spanish: Partido Liberal Unido, PLU) was a Chilean liberal political party which existed between 1930 and 1933.

It was the product of the union of Liberal Party, the Independent Liberal Party, Liberal Democratic Aliancist Party and the Liberal Democratic Unionist Party.

The supporters of Arturo Alessandri weren't included. It was a party related to Carlos Ibáñez del Campo. As time went by, its members split up to form other parties. With the downfall of Ibáñez all groups gathered up again, led by Alessandri to create the Liberal Party (October 1930) with a mutual party platform. In this process, the ULP merged into the LP during the VI Convention (October 1933) of the LP.

In the presidential elections of 1932 it presented the candidacy of Enrique Zañartu Prieto.

== Results in parliamentary elections ==
Year of election (max number of parliament seats)	1932 (142)
Number of parliament members	6
Votes obtained	18.203
Votes percentage	5,6

The electoral results of 1930 aren't included.

== Sources ==
The original version of this article draws heavily on the corresponding article in the Spanish-language Wikipedia, which was accessed in the version of June 7, 2007.

== See also ==
- Liberal Party (Chile, 1849–1966)
- Liberalism and radicalism in Chile
