= Pedro Opaso =

Chilean politician

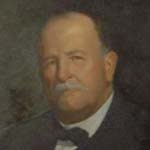

Member of the Senate
- In office 15 May 1924 – 15 May 1949
- Constituency: 6th Provincial Grouping

Acting President of Chile
- In office 26 July 1931 – 27 July 1931
- Preceded by: Carlos Ibáñez del Campo
- Succeeded by: Juan Esteban Montero

President of the Senate
- In office 26 May 1930 – 9 January 1933
- In office 23 May 1944 – 31 May 1944

Minister of War and Navy
- In office 16 June 1920 – 5 July 1920
- President: Arturo Alessandri

Minister of Industry and Public Works
- In office 23 June 1920 – 1 July 1920
- President: Arturo Alessandri

Member of the Chamber of Deputies
- In office 15 May 1921 – 15 May 1924
- Constituency: Talca

Personal details
- Born: 20 July 1876 Talca, Chile
- Died: 9 April 1957 (aged 80) Santiago, Chile
- Party: United Liberal
- Parent(s): Ursicinio Opaso; Margarita Letelier
- Education: University of Chile

Pedro Opaso Letelier (20 July 1876 – 9 April 1957) was a Chilean politician and provisional vice president of Chile in 1931. He also was senator from 1924 to 1949.

He was born in Talca, the son of Ursicino Opaso and Margarita Letelier. He completed his studies in his native city, and then attended the Universidad de Chile, where he became a physician. He started his political career as the first mayor of the city of Río Claro. In 1920 Opaso was named minister in several occasions as a representative of the Democratic Liberal Party. He was elected a deputy for Curicó (1921–1924) and a Senator for Talca (1924–1930) and Talca, Linares and Curico (1930–1932).

At the time of the collapse of the first administration of Carlos Ibáñez del Campo in 1931, he was the President of the Senate. As such he took over as provisional vice president. He assumed on July 26, and that same night he formed his cabinet, headed by Juan Esteban Montero as interior minister and Pedro Blanquier, the other key player, as Finance minister.

When the ministers arrived on the next morning, Opaso resigned by decree on Montero. His entire administration had lasted less than 24 hours. The speed he demonstrated to get rid of the power earned him the nickname of The Relayer (Spanish: El Pasador), that accompanied him till his death.

After his very brief administration, he was elected Senator for Curicó, Talca, Maule y Linares (1933–1949) and again President of the Senate in 1944. He died in Santiago in 1957.

== Biography ==
Pedro Opaso Letelier was born in Talca in 1876, son of Ursicinio Opaso Silva and Margarita Letelier Silva. He married Sara Cousiño Talavera, and they had five children: Raquel, Víctor, Sara, Pedro and Enrique.

Opaso completed his studies at the Liceo de Talca and later attended the Faculty of Medicine of the University of Chile. After finishing his professional training, he devoted himself primarily to agricultural activities.

He also held positions in economic and financial institutions, serving as counsellor of the State Railways and the Caja de Crédito Agrario, and as president of Banco de Talca.

== Political career ==
Opaso began his public life as mayor of Río Claro. He was appointed Minister of War and Navy, serving from 16 June to 5 July 1920; concurrently, he acted as interim Minister of Industry and Public Works between 23 June and 1 July 1920, during the administration of Arturo Alessandri. On 5 October 1925, Opaso signed the agreement by which political parties proclaimed Emiliano Figueroa Larraín as sole candidate for the presidency of the Republic.

He was member and president of the Liberal Democratic Unionist Party, a faction of the Liberal Democratic Party. In 1930, Opaso became president of the Liberal Unido Party, and in 1939 he presided over its party convention.

Opaso was elected deputy for Talca for the period 1921–1924, serving as substitute member of the Permanent Commission of Elections and member of the Permanent Commissions of Budget and Government. Congress was dissolved on 11 September 1924 by decree of the Government Junta.

=== Senator ===
He was elected senator for Talca for the period 1924–1930, serving on the Permanent Commissions of Legislation and Justice, and Agriculture, Industry and Railways; and as substitute member of the Permanent Commissions of War and Navy and Budget.

Opaso was reelected senator for the Sixth Provincial Grouping of "Talca, Linares and Maule" for the period 1926–1930. He served on the Permanent Commission of Public Works and Communications, which he presided. On 15 May 1930 he was provisional president of the Senate, and from 26 May 1930 to 9 January 1933 he served as President of the Senate of Chile.

He was reelected senator for the same grouping for the period 1930–1938. As President of the Senate, Opaso served as Vice President of the Republic from 26 to 27 July 1931, handing over power to the Minister of the Interior, Juan Esteban Montero. The revolutionary movement of 4 June 1932 decreed the dissolution of Congress on 6 June 1932.

Opaso was reelected senator for the Sixth Provincial Grouping of "Talca and Maule" for the period 1933–1941, later incorporating "Curicó and Linares" into the grouping. He served as substitute member of the Permanent Commissions of Public Works and Communications and Labor and Social Welfare, and member of the Permanent Commission of Internal Police. In the latter stage of this term, Opaso again joined the Permanent Commission of Public Works and Communications, which he presided.

He was reelected senator for the reformed Sixth Provincial Grouping of "Curicó, Talca, Maule and Linares" for the period 1941–1949. Opaso served as President of the Senate of Chile from 23 to 31 May 1944. During this term, he was member of the Permanent Commissions of Public Works and Communications and Internal Police and Regulations, and substitute member of the Permanent Commission of Agriculture and Colonization.
