= Ministry of Public Works (Chile) =

Cabinet-level administrative office in Chile

The Ministry of Public Works (Spanish: Ministerio de Obras Públicas) is the cabinet-level administrative office in charge of "planning, directing, controlling and building the public infrastructure, as well as the conservation and management of them" within Chile. It is also responsible for the "management, distribution, use and conservation" of all the water resources within the country. They answer directly to the President of Chile.

Since 19 May 2026, the Minister of Public Works is Louis de Grange. Since 11 March 2026, the Undersecretary of Public Works is Nicolás Balmaceda.

== History ==
The office was first created by law of 21 June 1887, under President José Manuel Balmaceda as the Ministry of Industry and Public Works. Since then it has undergone several reorganizations during its history, reflected in its different names:

- Ministry of Industry and Public Works 21 June 1887 - 20 May 1910
- Ministry of Industry, Public Works and Railroads 20 May 1910 - 19 December 1924
- Ministry of Public Works and Roads 19 December 1924 - 21 March 1925
- Ministry of Public Works, Commerce and Communication Roads 21 March 1925 - 3 October 1927
- Ministry of Foment 3 October 1927 - 21 October 1942
- Ministry of Public Works and Communication Roads 21 October 1942 – 1953
- Ministry of Public Works 1953 - 13 December 1967
- Ministry of Public Works and Transport 13 December 1967 - 8 July 1974
- Ministry of Public Works 8 July 1974 – present

== Titulars ==
=== Ministers of Industry and Public Works ===
Picture	Name	Entered office	Exited office	Notes	Appointed by
	Pedro Montt Montt	28 June 1887	13 April 1888		José Manuel Balmaceda
	Vicente Dávila Larraín	13 April 1888	2 November 1888		José Manuel Balmaceda
	Prudencio Lazcano	2 November 1888	21 January 1889		José Manuel Balmaceda
	Enrique Sanfuentes	21 January 1889	1 May 1889		José Manuel Balmaceda
	Jorge Riesco Errázuriz	1 May 1889	23 October 1889		José Manuel Balmaceda
	Ramón Barros Luco	23 October 1889	7 November 1889		José Manuel Balmaceda
	José Miguel Valdés	7 November 1889	7 August 1890		José Manuel Balmaceda
	Macario Vial	7 August 1890	15 October 1890		José Manuel Balmaceda
	Eulogio Allendes	15 October 1890	6 December 1890		José Manuel Balmaceda
	Guillermo Mackenna Serrano	6 December 1890	29 March 1891		José Manuel Balmaceda
	Nicanor Ugalde	29 March 1891	29 August 1891		José Manuel Balmaceda
	Agustín Edwards Ross	7 September 1891	14 March 1892	Appointed by	Revolutionary Junta of Iquique
	Agustín Edwards Ross	7 September 1891	14 March 1892	Reappointed by	Jorge Montt Álvarez
	Jorge Riesco Errázuriz	14 March 1892	11 June 1892		Jorge Montt Álvarez
	Vicente Dávila Larraín	11 June 1892	1894		Jorge Montt Álvarez
	Manuel Antonio Prieto	1894	1894		Jorge Montt Álvarez
	Elías Fernández	1894	1895		Jorge Montt Álvarez
	Juan Miguel Dávila	1895	1895		Jorge Montt Álvarez
	Elías Fernández	1895	18 September 1896		Jorge Montt Álvarez
	Francisco Baeza	18 September 1896	1896		Federico Errázuriz Echaurren
	Francisco Valdés	1896	1897		Federico Errázuriz Echaurren
	Belisario Prats Bello	1897	1897		Federico Errázuriz Echaurren
	Domingo de Toro	1897	1897		Federico Errázuriz Echaurren
	Emilio Orrego Luco	1897	1897		Federico Errázuriz Echaurren
	Julio Bañados	1897	1898		Federico Errázuriz Echaurren
	Emilio Bello	1898	1898		Federico Errázuriz Echaurren
	Arturo Alessandri	1898	1899		Federico Errázuriz Echaurren
	Daniel Rioseco	1899	2 September 1899		Federico Errázuriz Echaurren
	Gregorio Pinochet	2 September 1899	died 28 October 1899	Died in office	Federico Errázuriz Echaurren
	Florencio Valdés	30 October 1899	1900		Federico Errázuriz Echaurren
	Abraham Gacitúa	1900	1900		Federico Errázuriz Echaurren
	Rafael Orrego	1900	1900		Federico Errázuriz Echaurren
	Manuel Covarrubias	1900	1901		Federico Errázuriz Echaurren
	José Ramón Nieto	1901	1901		Federico Errázuriz Echaurren
	Joaquín Fernández	1901	18 September 1901	Appointed by	Federico Errázuriz Echaurren
	Joaquín Fernández	1901	18 September 1901	Reappointed by	Aníbal Zañartu
	Ismael Tocornal	18 September 1901	1901		Germán Riesco Errázuriz
	Rafael Orrego	1901	1902		Germán Riesco Errázuriz
	Joaquín Villarino	5 May 1902	1902		Germán Riesco Errázuriz
	Agustín Gana	1902	1903		Germán Riesco Errázuriz
	Francisco Rivas Vicuña	1903	1903		Germán Riesco Errázuriz
	Maximiliano Espinosa	1903	1903		Germán Riesco Errázuriz
	Manuel Espinosa	1903	12 May 1904		Germán Riesco Errázuriz
	Carlos Ávalos	12 May 1904	1 June 1904		Germán Riesco Errázuriz
	Francisco Valdés	1 June 1904	1904		Germán Riesco Errázuriz
	Anfión Muñoz	1904	1904		Germán Riesco Errázuriz
	Eduardo Charme	1904	1905		Germán Riesco Errázuriz
	Enrique Villegas	1905	1905		Germán Riesco Errázuriz
	José Ramón Gutiérrez	1905	1906		Germán Riesco Errázuriz
	Ramón Vergara Donoso	1906	1906		Germán Riesco Errázuriz
	Abraham Ovalle	1906	18 September 1906		Germán Riesco Errázuriz
	Eduardo Charme	18 September 1906	29 October 1906		Pedro Montt
	Carlos Ávalos	29 October 1906	7 November 1906		Pedro Montt
	Anselmo Hevia	7 November 1906	1907		Pedro Montt
	Gonzalo Urrejola	1907	1907		Pedro Montt
	Joaquín Figueroa	1908	1908		Pedro Montt
	Guillermo Echavarría	29 August 1908	22 January 1909		Pedro Montt
	Manuel Espinosa Jara	22 January 1909	15 June 1909		Pedro Montt
	Pedro García de la Huerta	15 June 1909	15 September 1909		Pedro Montt
	Eduardo Délano	15 September 1909	25 June 1910		Pedro Montt

=== Ministers of Industry, Public Works and Railroads ===
Picture	Name	Entered office	Exited office	Notes	Appointed by
	Fidel Muñoz Rodríguez	25 June 1910	10 November 1910	Appointed by	Pedro Montt
	Fidel Muñoz Rodríguez	25 June 1910	10 November 1910	Reappointed by	Elías Fernández Albano
	Fidel Muñoz Rodríguez	25 June 1910	10 November 1910	Reappointed by	Emiliano Figueroa
	Beltrán Mathieu Andrews	10 November 1910	23 December 1910		Emiliano Figueroa
	Ismael Valdés Vergara	23 December 1910	1911		Ramón Barros Luco
	Javier Gandarillas Matta	1911	1911		Ramón Barros Luco
	Enrique Zañartu Prieto	1911	1912		Ramón Barros Luco
	Abraham Ovalle Ovalle	1912	1912		Ramón Barros Luco
	Belfor Fernández	1912	1912		Ramón Barros Luco
	Oscar Viel Cavero	1912	1913		Ramón Barros Luco
	Enrique Zañartu Prieto	1913	1914		Ramón Barros Luco
	Absalón Valencia	1914	1914		Ramón Barros Luco
	Julio Garcés	1914	1914		Ramón Barros Luco
	Cornelio Saavedra Montt	1914	1915		Ramón Barros Luco
	Fernando Freire	1915	1915		Ramón Barros Luco
	Pedro Iñiguez Larraín	1915	23 December 1915		Ramón Barros Luco
	Roberto Guzmán Montt	23 December 1915	1916		Juan Luis Sanfuentes
	Angel Guarello Costa	1916	1916		Juan Luis Sanfuentes
	Justiniano Sotomayor Guzmán	1916	1916		Juan Luis Sanfuentes
	Ramón León Luco	1916	1917		Juan Luis Sanfuentes
	Alberto González Errázuriz	1917	1917		Juan Luis Sanfuentes
	Malaquías Concha Ortiz	1917	1918		Juan Luis Sanfuentes
	Francisco Landa Zárate	1918	1918		Juan Luis Sanfuentes
	Ramón Briones	1918	1918		Juan Luis Sanfuentes
	Francisco Landa Zárate	1918	1918		Juan Luis Sanfuentes
	Vicente Villalobos	1918	1919		Juan Luis Sanfuentes
	Manuel O'Ryan Carrasco	1919	1919		Juan Luis Sanfuentes
	Malaquías Concha Ortiz	1919	1919		Juan Luis Sanfuentes
	Oscar Dávila Izquierdo	1919	1920		Juan Luis Sanfuentes
	Malaquías Concha Ortiz	1920	1920		Juan Luis Sanfuentes
	Armando Jaramillo Valderrama	1920	23 December 1920		Juan Luis Sanfuentes
	Zenón Torrealba	23 December 1920	1921		Arturo Alessandri
	Artemio Gutiérrez	1921	1921		Arturo Alessandri
	Armando Jaramillo Valderrama	1921	1922		Arturo Alessandri
	Pedro Fajardo	1922	1922		Arturo Alessandri
	Miguel Letelier Espínola	1922	1922		Arturo Alessandri
	Absalón Valencia	1922	1923		Arturo Alessandri
	Robinson Paredes	1923	1923		Arturo Alessandri
	Vicente Villalobos	1923	1923		Arturo Alessandri
	Juan Vargas Márquez	1923	1923		Arturo Alessandri
	Francisco Mardones Otaíza	1923	1924		Arturo Alessandri
	Vicente Villalobos	1924	1924		Arturo Alessandri
	Robinson Paredes	1924	1924		Arturo Alessandri
	Guillermo Bañados	1924	1924		Arturo Alessandri
	Ángel Guarello	1924	1924		Arturo Alessandri

=== Ministers of Public Works and Roads ===
Picture	Name	Entered office	Exited office	Notes	Appointed by
	Oscar Dávila Izquierdo	11 September 1924	19 December 1924		September Junta
	Luis Molina Gómez	19 December 1924	23 January 1925		September Junta
	Francisco Mardones Otaíza	29 January 1925	27 August 1925	Appointed by	January Junta
	Francisco Mardones Otaíza	29 January 1925	27 August 1925	Reappointed by	Arturo Alessandri
	Gustavo Lira Manso	27 August 1925	2 October 1925		Arturo Alessandri

=== Ministers of Public Works, Commerce and Communication Roads ===
Picture	Name	Entered office	Exited office	Notes	Appointed by
	Alejandro García Castelblanco	2 October 1925	23 December 1925		Arturo Alessandri
	Angel Guarello Costa	23 December 1925	20 November 1926		Emiliano Figueroa
	Julio Velasco	20 November 1926	23 May 1927		Emiliano Figueroa
	Juan Emilio Ortiz	23 May 1927	6 September 1927		Carlos Ibáñez del Campo
	Enrique Balmaceda Toro	6 September 1927	29 September 1927	Interim	Carlos Ibáñez del Campo

=== Ministers of Foment ===
Picture	Name	Entered office	Exited office	Notes	Appointed by
	Adolfo Ibáñez Boggiano	29 September 1927	22 February 1929		Carlos Ibáñez del Campo
	Conrado Ríos Gallardo	22 February 1929	24 February 1929	Interim	Carlos Ibáñez del Campo
	Luis Schmidt Quezada	24 February 1929	23 August 1929		Carlos Ibáñez del Campo
	Emiliano Bustos	23 August 1929	23 July 1930		Carlos Ibáñez del Campo
	Edecio Torreblanca	23 July 1930	29 August 1930		Carlos Ibáñez del Campo
	Luis Matte Larraín	29 August 1930	27 November 1930		Carlos Ibáñez del Campo
	Edecio Torreblanca	27 November 1930	13 July 1931		Carlos Ibáñez del Campo
	Francisco Cereceda Cisternas	13 July 1931	21 July 1931		Carlos Ibáñez del Campo
	Alejandro García Castelblanco	23 July 1931	26 July 1931		Carlos Ibáñez del Campo
	Luis Gutiérrez Alliende	26 July 1931	27 July 1931		Pedro Opazo
	Francisco Cereceda Cisternas	27 July 1931	21 August 1931	Appointed by	Juan Esteban Montero
	Francisco Cereceda Cisternas	27 July 1931	21 August 1931	Reappointed by	Manuel Trucco
	Luis Alamos Barros	21 August 1931	3 September 1931		Manuel Trucco
	Enrique Matta Figueroa	3 September 1931	15 November 1931	Appointed by	Manuel Trucco
	Enrique Matta Figueroa	3 September 1931	15 November 1931	Reappointed by	Juan Esteban Montero
	Herman Echeverría	15 November 1931	7 April 1932		Juan Esteban Montero
	Marco Antonio de la Cuadra	7 April 1932	4 June 1932		Juan Esteban Montero
	Víctor Navarrete Senn	5 June 1932	13 September 1932	Appointed by	Government Junta of Chile (1932)
	Víctor Navarrete Senn	5 June 1932	13 September 1932	Reappointed by	Carlos Dávila
	Gustavo Lira Manso	14 September 1932	2 October 1932		Bartolomé Blanche
	Miguel Chamorro Araya	3 October 1932	24 December 1932		Abraham Oyanedel
	Alfredo Piwonka	24 December 1932	9 May 1933		Arturo Alessandri
	Domingo Santa María Sánchez	9 May 1933	31 October 1933		Arturo Alessandri
	Matías Silva Sepúlveda	31 October 1933	12 September 1936		Arturo Alessandri
	Luis Alamos Barros	12 September 1936	26 May 1937		Arturo Alessandri
	Ricardo Bascuñán Stonner	26 May 1937	24 December 1938		Arturo Alessandri
	Arturo Bianchi Gundián	24 December 1938	25 December 1939		Pedro Aguirre Cerda
	Oscar Schnake	25 December 1939	16 December 1941	Appointed by	Pedro Aguirre Cerda
	Oscar Schnake	25 December 1939	16 December 1941	Reappointed by	Jerónimo Méndez
	Rolando Meriño Reyes	16 December 1941	2 April 1942		Jerónimo Méndez
	Oscar Schnake	2 April 1942	1942		Juan Antonio Ríos

=== Ministry of Public Words (1974–present) ===
Minister	Start	End	Party	President
Martín Arrau	11 March 2026	19 May 2026	Republican	José Antonio Kast
Louis de Grange	19 May 2026	Incumbent	Ind.	José Antonio Kast

== See also ==
- Foreign relations of Chile

== Sources ==
- República de Chile (1942). "VI. Poder Ejecutivo - Nómina de Gobernantes, Presidentes y Ministros desde la Independencia.". Manual del Senado. 1810-1942 (PDF) (in Spanish). Santiago de Chile: Imprenta Universitaria. (in Spanish)
- Valencia Avaria, Luis (1986). Anales de la República: textos constitucionales de Chile y registro de los ciudadanos que han integrado los poderes ejecutivo y legislativo desde 1810 (in Spanish) (2ª edición ed.). Santiago de Chile: Editorial Andrés Bello. (in Spanish)
