= Concha (name) =

Concha is a Spanish surname of Latin origin. It was derived from the Latin word concha which means shell and is used as a topographic surname referring to those living in or near a cavity. In American Spanish it also refers to an ornamental disk of American Indian origin having a shell or flower design. It is used as a diminutive of the Spanish feminine given name Concepción.

Notable people with the name include:

== Given name ==
- Concha Alós, Concepción Alós Domingo (1926–2011), Spanish writer
- Concha Andreu (born 1967), Spanish oenologist and politician
- Concha Buika, María Concepción Balboa Buika (born 11 May 1972), Spanish singer
- Concha Calleja (born 1964), Spanish writer and journalist
- Concha Catalá (1881–1968), Spanish actress
- Concha Espina (1870s–1955), Spanish writer
- Concha García Campoy (1958–2013), Spanish journalist
- Concha Ibáñez (1926–2022), Spanish painter and writer
- Concha Jerez (born 1941), Spanish artist
- Concha Liaño, Concepción Liaño Gil (1916–2014), Spanish anarchist
- Concha Meléndez (1895–1983), Puerto Rican writer
- Concha Méndez (1898–1986), Spanish poet
- Concha Michel (1899–1990), Mexican singer and songwriter
- Concha Peña Pastor, Concepción Peña Pastor (1906–1960), Spanish lawyer
- Concha Piquer, Concepción Piquer López (1906–1990), Spanish singer
- Concha Urquiza, María Concepción Urquiza del Valle (1910–1946), Mexican poet
- Concha Valdés Miranda (1928–2017), Cuban singer
- Concha Velasco (1939–2023), Spanish actress
- Concha Zardoya, María Concepción Zardoya González (1914–2004), Chilean poet

== Surname ==
- Carmen Concha (born 1902), Filipino film director, producer, screenwriter, costume designer, and novelist
- David Concha (born 1996), Spanish footballer
- Elpidio Concha (born 1963), Mexican politician
- Eugenio Mier y Concha (born 1949), Mexican politician
- Francisco Miranda Concha (1869–1950), Spanish trade unionist and militant
- Jairo Concha (born 1999), Peruvian footballer
- Jorge Pérez Concha (1908–1995), Ecuadorian historian, writer, and diplomat
- José de Santiago Concha, several people
- José Vicente Concha, Colombian president
- Juan Concha, several people
- Likar Ramos Concha (born 1985), Colombian boxer
- Luis Concha Córdoba (1891–1975), Colombian priest
- Malaquías Concha (1859–1921), Chilean lawyer and politician
- Manuel Concha (born 1980), Swedish film director
- Maria Isabel Sanchez-Concha (1889–1977), Peruvian screenwriter
- Matias Concha (born 1980), Swedish footballer
- Malaquías Concha (1859–1921), Chilean writer, lawyer, and politician
- Melchor Concha y Toro (1833–1892), Chilean businessman, lawyer, and politician
- Morín Edith Contreras Concha (born 1971), Chilean accountant and politician
- Pablo Holman Concha, member of the Chilean pop rock band Kudai
- Sara Concha (born 1995), Chilean politician

== See also ==
- De la Concha, Spanish surname
