= Concha (disambiguation) =

Concha is a traditional Mexican sweet bread roll.

Concha may also refer to:

- Concha (name), list of people with the name
- Concha (κόγχη, κόγχος), meaning seashell in Greek and named like this due to its shape, was an ancient Greek and Roman vessel of different size and was used for various purposes as saltcellars, for oils, perfumes, etc
- Concha, the hollow next to the ear canal in the auricle
- Nasal concha, a curled shelf of bone that protrudes into the breathing passage of the nose
- Conchera, or concha, Mexican stringed-instruments
- Concha, a Spanish profanity in some countries for female genitalia
- Concha Formation, a geologic formation in Texas and Arizona
- Concha or Concho (ornament), a typically oval silver ornament found in Native American art
- Concho language, an extinct Uto-Aztecan language

== See also ==
- Concho (disambiguation)
- De la Concha, a surname
- La Concha (disambiguation)
- Conch, a number of sea snails
