= José Domingo Jaramillo Urzúa =

Chilean farmer and politician

José Domingo Jaramillo Urzúa (July 25, 1851 – Nancagua, May 9, 1916) was a Chilean farmer and politician.

== Family ==
He was born on July 25, 1851, being the third of the five children of the marriage formed by ex-deputy owner Pedro José Jaramillo Niño and Mercedes Urzúa Correa.

He married Jesús Valderrama Lira, sister of the liberal politician José María Valderrama Lira, with whom he had three children: Mercedes, Armando, and Fernando; The latter would also be parliamentarians and ministers of state. Among his grandchildren is the former deputy, former senator, and former ambassador, Armando Jaramillo Lyon, member of the Liberal Party (PL).

== Public career ==
He dedicated himself to agricultural activities on his farm "El Cardal" in the commune of Nancagua, where he also served as mayor. He was elected deputy for San Fernando, for the legislative period 1897–1900; during his administration, he was a member of the Permanent Commission of War and Navy.

He died at his farm on May 9, 1916, at the age of 65.
