= Concho =

Concho may refer to:

== Places in the United States ==
- Concho, Arizona
  - Concho Lake
- Concho, Oklahoma
- Concho County, Texas
- Concho, West Virginia
- Concho Valley, a region in West Texas
- Fort Concho, in San Angelo, Texas

== Rivers ==
- Concho River, a tributary of the Colorado River in Texas
  - North Concho River
  - South Concho River

== Other uses ==
- Puerto Rican Crested Toad locally known as sapo concho
- Concho Resources Inc., a Texas oil exploration company
- Concho (ornament), a typically oval silver ornament found in Native American art
- Concho language, an extinct Uto-Aztecan language
- Rachel Concho (born 1936), a Native American artist and potter

== See also ==
- Concha (disambiguation)
- Rio Conchos, in Mexico
- USNS Mission Santa Ana, a United States Navy oiler, originally intended as USS Concho
