= La Concha =

La Concha may refer to:

- La Concha Renaissance San Juan Resort, in Puerto Rico
- La Concha Motel, a former motel on the Las Vegas Strip, Nevada, United States
- Beach of La Concha and La Concha Bay, in San Sebastián, Basque Country, Spain
- La Concha Beach Club, in Havana, Cuba

== See also ==
- Conch, a number of sea snails
- Concha (disambiguation)
- De la Concha (disambiguation)
