= Ursúa =

Ursúa, Ursua, Urzúa or Urzua is a Basque surname. Notable people with the surname include:

- Adolfo Holley Urzua (1833–1914), Chilean general
- Antonio María de Bucareli y Ursúa (1717–1779), Spanish military officer, governor of Cuba, viceroy of New Spain
- Carlos Manuel Urzúa Macías (1955–2024), Mexican politician and academic
- Diego Urzúa (born 1997), Chilean professional footballer
- Domingo Vega Urzúa, also known as Americo, Chilean musician
- Francisco de Paula Bucareli y Ursua (1708–1780), his brother, Governor of the Rio de la Plata, viceroy of Navarre
- José Domingo Jaramillo Urzúa (1851–1916), Chilean farmer and politician
- Luis Urzúa, Chilean miner, and shift foreman and leader of the trapped miners during the 2010 Copiapó mining accident
- Marcelo Urzúa (born 1962), Chilean footballer
- María Guadalupe Urzúa Flores (1912–2004), Mexican politician and activist
- María José Urzúa, Chilean actress
- Martín de Ursúa y Arizmendi, count of Lizárraga (1653–1715), Spanish conquistador during the final conquest of the Maya in 1697
- Pedro de Ursúa (1526–1561), Spanish conquistador in the 16th century
- Pedro Verdugo de Albornoz Ursúa (1657–1720), Spanish noble and academician
- Ricardo Urzúa Rivera (born 1966), Mexican politician from the Institutional Revolutionary Party (PRI)
