= Luis Enrique Concha =

Chilean politician

Member of the Senate
- In office 15 May 1926 – 14 September 1931
- Constituency: 7th Provincial Grouping
- In office 12 October 1921 – 11 September 1924
- Constituency: Concepción

Personal details
- Born: 1880 San Javier de Loncomilla, Chile
- Died: 14 September 1931 Santiago, Chile
- Party: Democrat Party
- Relatives: Malaquías Concha (uncle)
- Occupation: Lawyer, journalist, politician

Luis Enrique Concha González (1880 – 14 September 1931) was a Chilean lawyer, journalist and politician of the Democratic Party. He served as senator of the Republic representing Concepción and later the Seventh Provincial Grouping.

== Biography ==
He was born in 1880 to Constancio Concha –brother of Malaquías Concha– and Eloísa González.

Concha was elected as Senator for the 1921–1924 period, replacing his uncle Malaquías, founder of the Democrat Party.
