= Zenón Torrealba =

Chilean politician

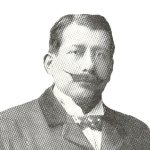

Minister of Industry, Public Works and Railways
- In office 23 December 1920 – 1921
- President: Arturo Alessandri
- Preceded by: Armando Jaramillo V.
- Succeeded by: Artemio Gutiérrez

Member of the Senate
- In office 15 May 1918 – 10 September 1923
- Constituency: Santiago

Personal details
- Born: 8 April 1875 Curicó, Chile
- Died: 10 September 1923 (aged 48) Santiago, Chile
- Party: Democrat Party

Zenón Torrealba Ilabaca (9 April 1875 – 10 September 1923) was a Chilean journalist, labor leader and politician. He founded the Democratic Party newspaper La Tribuna in 1905, which he directed until 1915.

A member of the Democratic Party, he represented Santiago as deputy from 1909 to 1912 and from 1915 to 1918, and served in the senator from 1918 until his assassination in 1923. He was also Minister of Industry, Public Works and Railways during the first presidency of Arturo Alessandri.

Torrealba was born in Curicó on 9 April 1875, the son of José Torrealba and Margarita Ilabaca. He was killed by Luis Correa Ramírez on 10 September 1923.
