= Joaquín Figueroa =

Chilean politician (1863–1929)

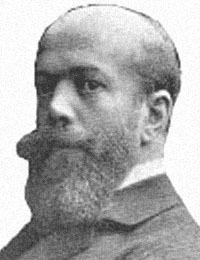
- Born: October 13, 1863; Santiago, Chile
- Died: May 30, 1929 (aged 65); Santiago, Chile

Joaquín Figueroa Larraín (1863 - May 30, 1929) was a Chilean politician, and brother of President Emiliano Figueroa.

== Biography ==
Figueroa was born in Santiago, the son of Francisco de Paula Figueroa Araoz and of Rosalía Larraín Echeverría. He studied at the San Ignacio School and then went on to study law at the University of Chile, graduating on January 13, 1886. He married Elena Amunátegui Valdés but they had no children.

Figueroa decided to embark on a political career and joined the Independent Liberal Party. On October 25, 1907, President Pedro Montt appointed Figueroa as Minister of Industry and Public Works, a position which he kept until August 29, 1908. President Montt also appointed him as Minister of Finance between June 15 and September 15, 1909. Then, in a 1908 by-election, he was elected Senator for Valparaíso, Chile and then reelected in 1912. President Ramón Barros Luco appointed him Minister of Foreign Affairs, Cult and Colonization from May 29 to August 8, 1912.

Joaquín Figueroa was a Director of the National Children's Fund (Patronato Nacional de la Infancia); Vice President of the Santiago Charity Council (Junta de Beneficencia de Santiago); director of the San Luis Hospital and in 1911, one of the founders of the National Historic Museum of Chile and later one of its directors. He died in Santiago, in 1929, at the age of 66.

== Additional information ==
=== See also ===
- Emiliano Figueroa

=== Sources ===
- Official biography (in Spanish)

Political offices
Preceded by Gonzalo Urrejola	Minister of Industry and Public Works; 1907–1908	Succeeded by Guillermo Echavarría
Preceded by Luis Devoto	Minister of Finance; 1909	Succeeded by Manuel Salinas
Preceded by Renato Sánchez	Minister of Foreign Affairs, Cult and Colonization; 1912	Succeeded by Antonio Huneeus
