= Concha Calleja =

Spanish writer and journalist

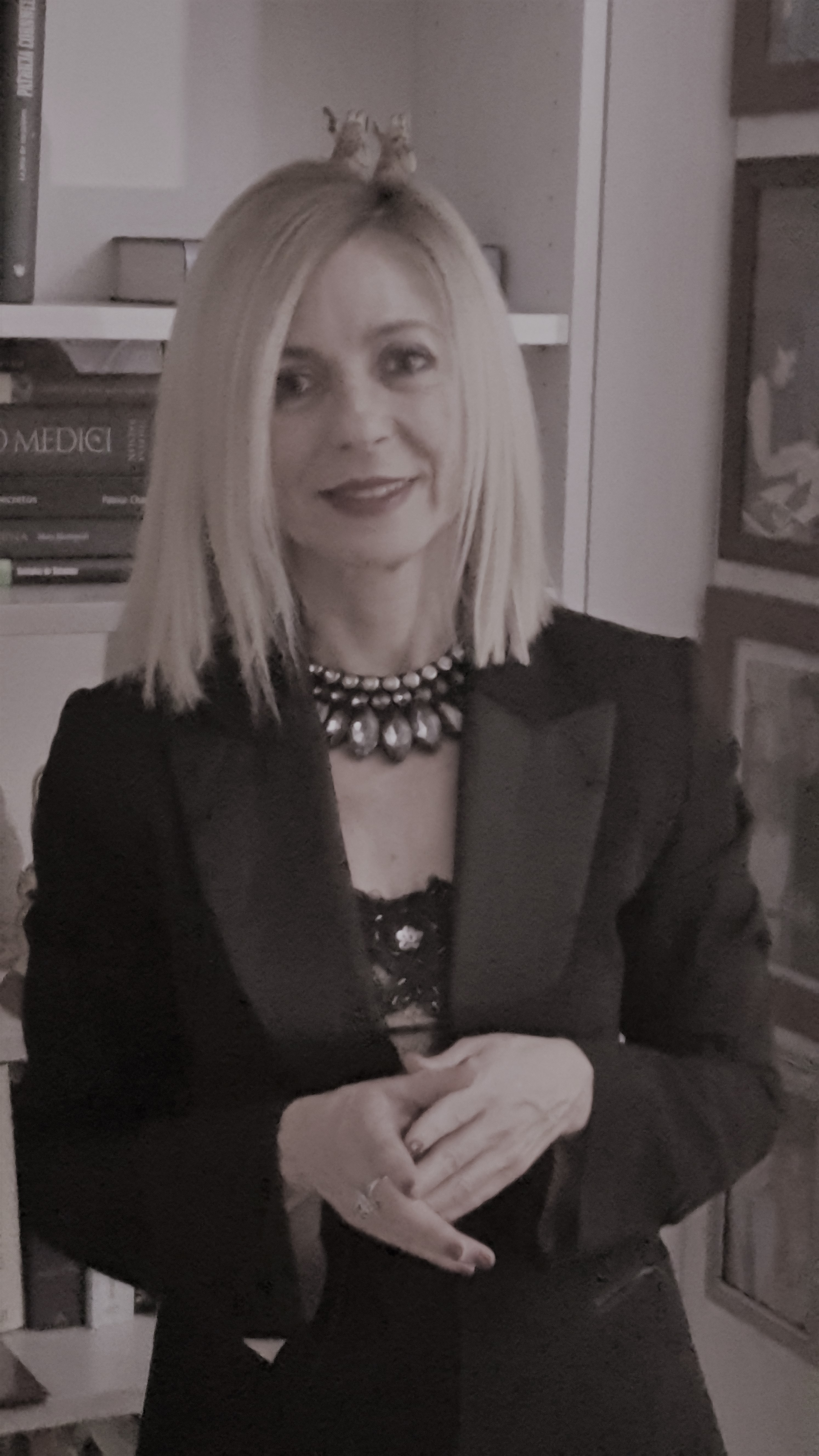
- Born: 10 July 1964 (age 62); Barcelona, Spain
- Occupations: Writer, journalist
- Website: conchacalleja.com

Concha Calleja (born 10 July 1964) is a Spanish writer and journalist. Her activity has focused on journalism, biographies of historical or famous people, and scripts for movies and TV series of her books.

Her books address the investigation of crimes with the greatest international impact, which could have been orchestrated or are suspected of having been, and the analysis of the characters of the people involved, from a psychological perspective.

== Biography ==
She studied BS in "Geography and History" at UNED, in addition to "Protocol and Institutional Relationships". She holds a Master of Arts in Counseling Psychology from Cambridge International University; Studied Criminology; "Coaching with PNL and Emotional Intelligence", in Learn Nimbus-Real Results Coaching and "Judicial Expert in Forensic Psychology" by Euroinnova Business School.

In her professional beginnings, she carried out reports on archaeological excavations sponsored by the Archaeological Museum of Gavá (Barcelona), which led her to start in the world of the press, and to publish numerous articles in various media such as La Vanguardia, El Periódico, El Mundo newspaper, and the magazines Mundo Científico, La Clave, Cuadernos de Pedagogía, Historia y Vida and Historia 16. Two of her books, Cayetana, Duquesa de Alba and El álbum privado de la Duquesa de Alba, served as a script for the television series La duquesa, which was aired on Tele5. Also, the book La mujer morena, musa de Julio Romero de Torres served as the basis for the documentary that she presented, which was broadcast on Canal Sur TV.

She has collaborated in the Sabor a ti program of Antena 3, directed by Ana Rosa Quintana; in the social-political talk of Canal Sur TV Abre tu ventana by Tom Martín Benitez; in Tele 5, A tu lado and La Noria; in RN4 in the program Amb molt de gust by Silvia Tarragona; In Onda Cero "Al otro lado". In 2007 he participated daily in television, in Las mañanas de Cuatro by Concha García Campoy and, later in ''Espejo público'' of Antena 3, and as an expert in monarchies in several periods of TVE1' in the daily Las mañanas de la 1. She currently collaborates in the programs of Iker Jiménez, Horizonte, and Cuarto Milenio, based on his investigations into crimes suspected of having been orchestrated, or unresolved.

== Books ==
- Contagiados: ¿Quién nos enfermó? Arcopress 2023.
- Target Michael Jackson. The conspiracy to end the king of pop. EMDE 2020
- Objetivo Michael Jackson. La conspiración para acabar con el rey del pop. Arcopress 2019
- Diana, Réquiem por una mentira. Arcopress 2017
- La duquesa. El café de la rosa 2013
- Duquesa de Alba: historia y vida 6 volúmenes 2012
- La mujer morena, musa de Julio Romero de Torres. Editorial Almuzara 2011
- ¡Elemental, querido Watson! Ipuntoediciones 2010
- Hombres ilustres, sus cartas de amor. Es ediciones 2008
- Diana de Gales, me van a asesinar. Arcopress 2007
- El triunfo de Camila. Arcopress 2005
- El álbum privado de la duquesa de Alba. Belacqua 2005
- Felipe de Borbón, listo para reinar. Espejo de tinta 2004
- Tita Cervera, una historia sin título (Biografía de la baronesa Thyssen). Belacqua 2004
- Carmen, una historia real. Laberinto 2003
- Pasiones insólitas. Belacqua 2003
- Bajo el mármol blanco y negro (novela histórica) Plaza & Janés 2002
- Cayetana, Pasión andaluza (Biografía autorizada por la duquesa de Alba). Plaza & Janés 2001
- El último beso de Cayetana de Alba. Espasa-Calpe 1999
- Con toda franqueza. Editorial Planeta 1998
