= Ramón Briones Luco =

Chilean lawyer and radical politician

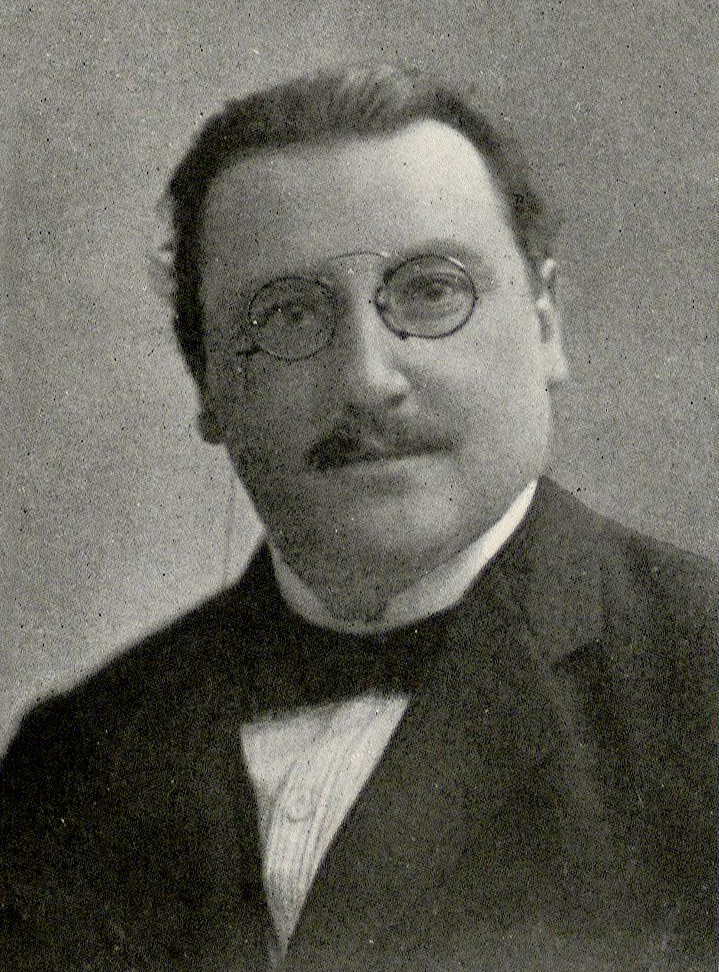

Minister of Foreign Affairs, Worship and Colonization
- In office 20 July 1924 – 5 September 1924
- President: Arturo Alessandri
- Preceded by: Galvarino Gallardo
- Succeeded by: Emilio Bello

Minister of Industry, Public Works and Railways
- In office 22 April 1918 – 6 September 1918
- President: Juan Luis Sanfuentes

President of the Chamber of Deputies
- In office 23 October 1918 – 18 November 1920

Member of the Senate
- In office 1921–1924
- Constituency: Tarapacá

Member of the Chamber of Deputies
- In office 1915–1921
- Constituency: Tarapacá and Pisagua

Personal details
- Party: Radical Party
- Spouse: Camila Carvajal Miranda
- Children: 3
- Relatives: Carlos Briones Luco (brother)
- Education: University of Chile
- Occupation: Lawyer, politician and diplomat

Ramón Briones Luco (6 July 1872 – 16 August 1949) was a Chilean lawyer, politician and diplomat.

A member of the Radical Party, he served as a member of the Chamber of Deputies of Chile and the Senate of Chile, was president of the Chamber of Deputies from 1918 to 1920, and held ministerial office under presidents Juan Luis Sanfuentes and Arturo Alessandri. He later served as Chilean ambassador to Italy.

== Early life ==
Briones Luco was born in Chimbarongo on 6 July 1872, the son of Francisco Javier Briones Arriagada and Lucinda Luco Avaria. His brother, Carlos Briones Luco, also served as a member of the Chilean Congress.

He attended the Colegio Santo Tomás de Aquino and the Instituto Nacional before studying law at the University of Chile. He qualified as a lawyer on 26 October 1898 after completing a thesis on divorce.

On 1 July 1896, he married Camila Carvajal Miranda at the parish of Santa Ana. The couple had three children.

Briones entered public service in the Ministry of Foreign Affairs, where he headed the section responsible for worship and colonization in 1896. He subsequently worked as an attorney for the Defensa Fiscal until 1907. From 1921 to 1924, he served as an attorney for the Consejo de Defensa Fiscal in Tarapacá and Antofagasta.

== Political career ==
A member of the Radical Party, Briones chaired its Santiago assembly and later became president of the party in 1924.

He was elected to the Chamber of Deputies for Tarapacá and Pisagua for the 1915–1918 legislative term. During this period, he served on the permanent committee for foreign relations and colonization.

Briones was reelected for the same constituency for the 1918–1921 term. On 23 October 1918, he became president of the Chamber of Deputies, holding the position until 18 November 1920.

During his parliamentary career, he introduced a bill concerning divorce and promoted legislative proposals dealing with compulsory secular primary education, national colonies and private-sector employees. He was also involved in legislation concerning occupational hazards and workplace accidents.

President Juan Luis Sanfuentes appointed Briones Minister of Industry, Public Works and Railways on 22 April 1918. He remained in office until 6 September of that year.

In 1920, Briones served as a member of the Court of Honor established in connection with the disputed presidential election of 1920, which resulted in the election of Arturo Alessandri.

Briones was elected to the Senate for Tarapacá for the 1921–1927 legislative period. He served on the permanent committees for public works and colonization and for government and elections, chairing the latter. He was also a substitute member of the committees for finance and municipal loans, agriculture, industry and railways, and internal police.

He additionally served on the Comisión Conservadora during the 1922–1923 congressional recess. His senatorial mandate ended prematurely when Congress was dissolved on 11 September 1924 following the political and military crisis of that year.

During Alessandri's presidency, Briones was appointed Minister of Foreign Affairs, Worship and Colonization, serving from 20 July until 5 September 1924.

== Later career ==
Briones remained involved in public affairs after leaving Congress. In 1939, he served as a director and councillor of the Central Bank of Chile and was appointed Chilean ambassador to Italy.

He also wrote for newspapers and magazines and published works including Glosario de colonización and the two-volume Origen del matrimonio y el divorcio. Briones belonged to organizations including the Sociedad Científica de Chile and the Liga de Protección de Estudiantes Pobres e Higiene Social.

Among his foreign distinctions, he received the Grand Cross of the Order of the Crown of Italy.

Briones died in Santiago on 16 August 1949, aged 77.
