= Elías Fernández Albano =

Chilean politician (c. 1845–1910)

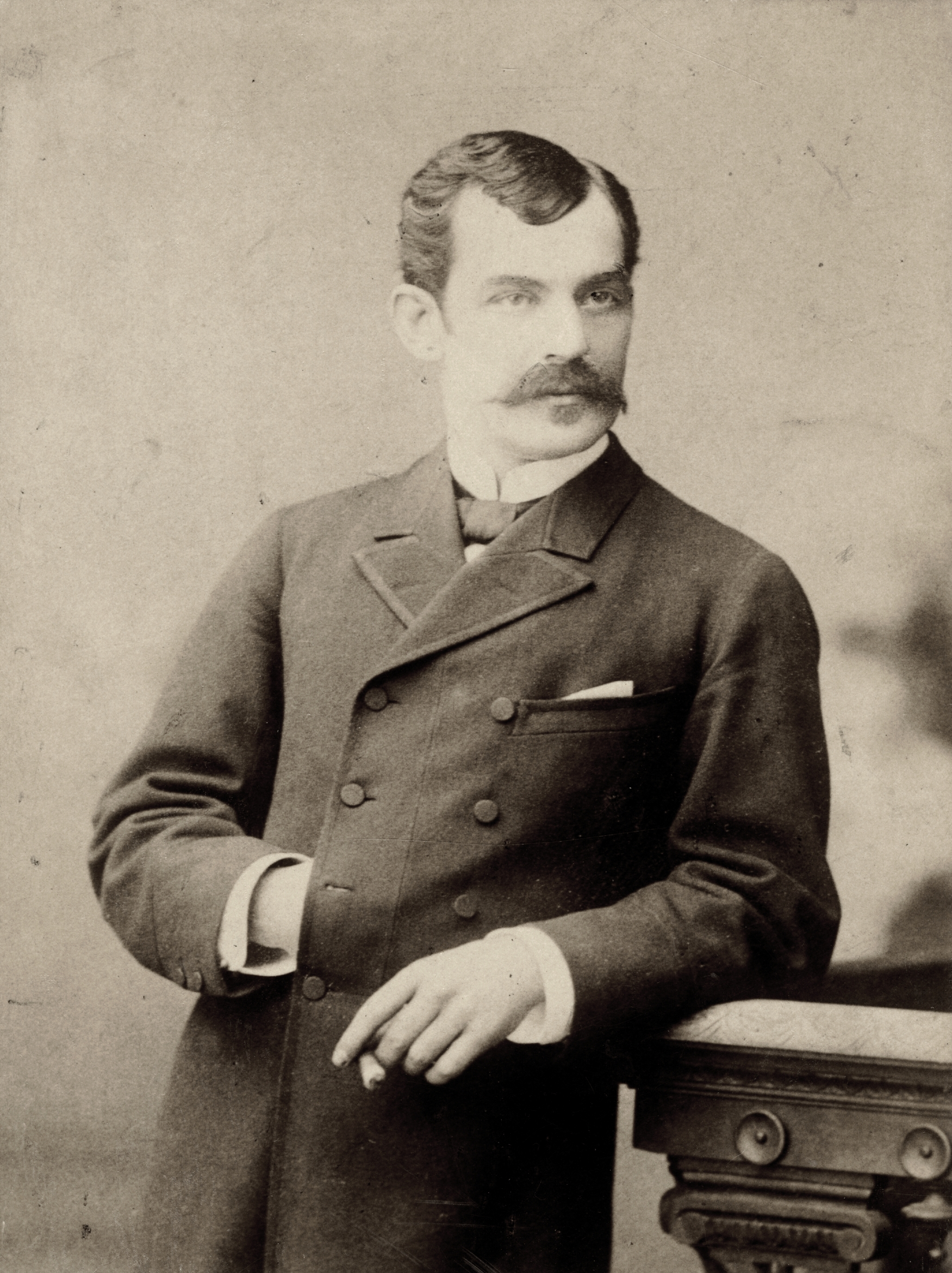

Acting President of Chile
- In office August 16, 1910 – September 6, 1910
- Vice President: Emiliano Figueroa Larraín
- Preceded by: Pedro Montt Montt
- Succeeded by: Emiliano Figueroa Larraín

Personal details
- Born: c. 1845 Santiago, Chile
- Died: September 6, 1910 Santiago, Chile
- Spouse: Mercedes Barañao Ochagavía

Elías Fernández Albano (c. 1845 - September 6, 1910) was a Chilean politician, who was acting president of Chile from August 16, 1910 until his death.

He was born in Santiago de Chile, the son of Juan de Dios Fernández Gana and María del Pilar Albano Vergara. He was great-grandson of Juan Albano Pereira Márquez.
He studied at the Instituto Nacional and later graduated as a lawyer from the Universidad de Chile. He was accepted to the bar on May 18, 1869. On August 16, 1871, he married Mercedes Barañao Ochagavía.

He was elected Deputy for Lontué in 1885 and reelected in 1891. In 1894 he was elected for the Talca, Curepto and Lontué district. Fernández was twice Minister of Industry and Public Works under President Jorge Montt (1894-1896); Minister of War and Navy (1896–97), Finance (1897) and Interior (1899-1900) under Federico Errázuriz Echaurren, and again minister of Interior under Germán Riesco Errázuriz (1902-1903).

In 1910, President Pedro Montt Montt, seriously ill, took a leave of absence and moved to Germany for treatment, which proved unsuccessful, and Fernández, as Minister of the Interior, served during Montt's absence and became acting president upon Montt's death on August 16, 1910. Fernández, however, caught a cold during Montt's funeral, which soon turned into pulmonary, causing him to die of heart failure in Santiago de Chile on September 6, 1910, after only three weeks in office.

Political offices
Preceded by Manuel Antonio Prieto	Minister of Industry and Public Works; 1894-1895	Succeeded by Juan Miguel Dávila
Preceded by Juan Miguel Dávila	Minister of Industry and Public Works; 1895-1896	Succeeded by Francisco Baeza
Preceded by Manuel Bulnes Pinto	Minister of War and Navy; 1896-1897	Succeeded by Benjamín Vergara
Preceded by Rafael Sotomayor Gaete	Minister of the Interior; 1899-1900	Succeeded by Mariano Sánchez Fontecilla
Preceded by Ramón Barros Luco	Minister of the Interior; 1902-1903	Succeeded by Ramón Barros Luco
Preceded by Agustín Edwards Mac Clure	Minister of the Interior; 1910	Succeeded by Emiliano Figueroa Larraín
Preceded by Pedro Montt Montt	Acting President of Chile; 1910	Succeeded by Emiliano Figueroa Larraín
