= Adolfo Ibáñez University =

Private research university in Santiago, Chile

- Universidad Adolfo Ibáñez
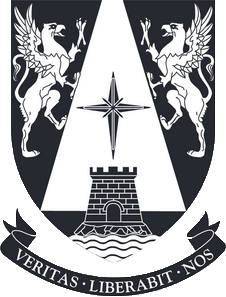
- Logo of the Adolfo Ibáñez University
- Other name: UAI
- Motto: Veritas liberabit nos
- Motto in English: The Truth Sets Us Free
- Type: Private
- Established: 1953; 73 years ago
- Parent institution: Catholic University of Valparaíso; Federico Santa María Technical University
- Accreditation: Triple accreditation
- Budget: CLP$73.493.332
- Rector: Francisco Covarrubias
- Academic staff: 372
- Students: 11,496
- Undergraduates: 8,769
- Postgraduates: 2,727
- Location: Santiago, Chile: Peñalolén; Presidente Errázuriz; Viña del Mar, Chile
- Website: uai.cl
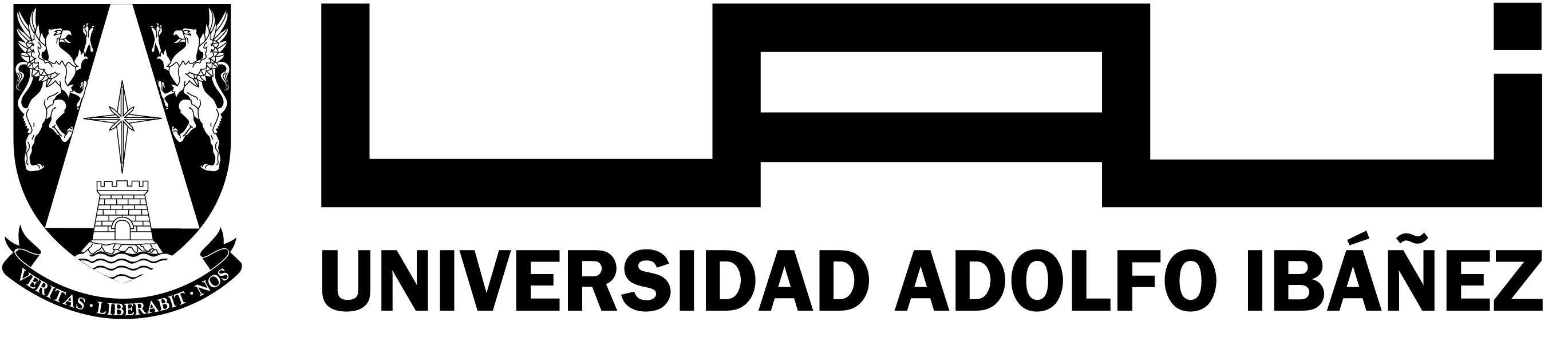

The Adolfo Ibáñez University (Spanish: Universidad Adolfo Ibáñez) (UAI) is a private research university in Santiago, Chile, associated with the Adolfo Ibáñez Foundation. In 1988, in accordance with new educational legislation, a new university was founded based on the Valparaiso Business School (Escuela de Negocios de Valparaiso), an older institution for professional teaching in business administration founded in 1953 by Adolfo Ibáñez Boggiano. The newer university would take its name some decades later.

In the Chilean higher educational scheme, UAI is a private university accredited in the country by the Comisión Nacional de Acreditación (CNA) and internationally by the Triple Accreditation.

The Adolfo Ibañez University is ranked the 1st Private University in Chile by América Economía and the CSIC (Spanish institution for University research).

== History ==
The Valparaiso Business School (Escuela de Negocios de Valparaíso), was established in 1953 under the protection of the Pontifical Catholic University of Valparaiso. It is noted for being the first educational institution in Chile to offer the business administration career, as well as one of pioneers in Latin America.

In 1995, the humanistic subjects were introduced into the career to make a little change in the students of a career like Business administration.

In the early 1970s, the alliance between the business school and the university was broken, and after a few years of autonomy, a new alliance was signed with the Federico Santa María Technical University, a new association that would remain until the late 1980s.

In 1979, it became the first business school to introduce an MBA program in Chile.

After the educational reform brought about by the military government, in the last years of the 1980 decade, Adolfo Ibáñez University was founded with the business school like central axis. In 1989 the careers of Laws and Engineering were opened, in 1996 Journalism and Pedagogy and in 2002 Psychology. During 2002 the new Peñalolen Campus was opened in Santiago.

In 2006, this organization founded the Adolfo Ibáñez School of Management, settling this school for post-graduate programs in Miami. It is the first Latin-American MBA program, to be certified by the US government.

In March 2009, this institution settled the arrangements, so the students of the Master in Finance can easily perform the CFA (Chartered Financial Analyst) international exams, and so obtain their certification, due to the needs that the market has applied to the graduated students. The Economist has already exposed this problem, that the educational institutions should pay attention to.

In April 2009, it associated with Indian School of Business, for the creation of mutual post-graduate programs, specifically speaking, not only the creation of an international MBA program, but also the exchange of students and teachers between them. The Financial Times establishes this Indian institution in the 15th position among the whole globe, in matters of post-graduate programs.

University rankings

Global – Overall
- QS World: =578 (2026)

In May 2010, Adolfo Ibañez business School closes a strategic alliance for Dual Degree with UCLA (John E. Anderson School of Management), in which establishes that one fourth of the Global Executive MBA is to be done in Chile, while the rest, in the exterior. Until UCLA had his mind set up, the final competitors in consideration were three; Adolfo Ibañez Business School, Pontifical Catholic University of Chile, and the ITAM (Mexican's Institute). This does represent a huge achievement because no Latin American university has a Dual Degree with a Top 10 North American institution.

== Educational model ==
Since 2002, in this institution, the plan was to put in use the model that many prestigious universities use abroad. Students now have a major, minors and fundamental subjects. The major is normally engineering, literature, psychology, etc. The minor can be done in quite different fields, such as drama, music, philosophy, etc. Fundamental (core curriculum) subjects are required for all student.

== Peñalolén Campus ==
The Peñalolén campus is located at the eastern edge of Santiago, sprawling over nearly 250 acres (1.0 km^{2}) in the foothills of San Ramón Hill, in the city's Peñalolén Municipality.

The university buildings occupy nearly 110,000 square feet (10,000 m^{2}) and are used mainly by undergraduate students. All classrooms are equipped with audiovisual media resources. There is a computer room for training and personal work, and the campus has network connections throughout. In addition, there are five computer labs for Civil Engineering.

The campus has a gym with machines and aerobics rooms, which each enrolled student is able to use via biometric log in. There are also several cafeterias across the campus which can be used by students not just for eating, but also for holding meetings and socializing. There are currently 680 parking spaces available for students.

== Presidente Errázuriz Campus ==
The Presidente Errázuriz campus in the Las Condes section of northeast Santiago is dedicated mainly to postgraduate programs. It is here that seminar program classes are held. It has two amphitheater-style classrooms with audio equipment. There are also climate-controlled study rooms and work cubicles with computers for students.

The offices of the Dean of the Adolfo Ibáñez University Business School and many business department professors are located on this campus.

== Recreo Campus - Viña del Mar ==
Located in the residential neighborhood of Viña del Mar, the Recreo campus was designed to provide an optimal academic setting, with amphitheater-style classrooms and a central courtyard offering a panorama of Viña del Mar and the Pacific Ocean.

One of the focal points of the campus is the house that Adolfo Ibáñez Boggiano built in the 1930s, which is now ringed by the various buildings that make up the present-day campus.

== Sporting Club Campus ==
The Sporting Club Campus was expected to be operational at the beginning of 2011. This campus was designed to replace the old Recreo Campus because the old building does not suit the actual requirements of the university in Viña del Mar. It was to consist of four structures, pulled up together to constitute the main center of operations in that region.
