= Adolfo Ibáñez Boggiano =

Chilean businessman (1880–1949)

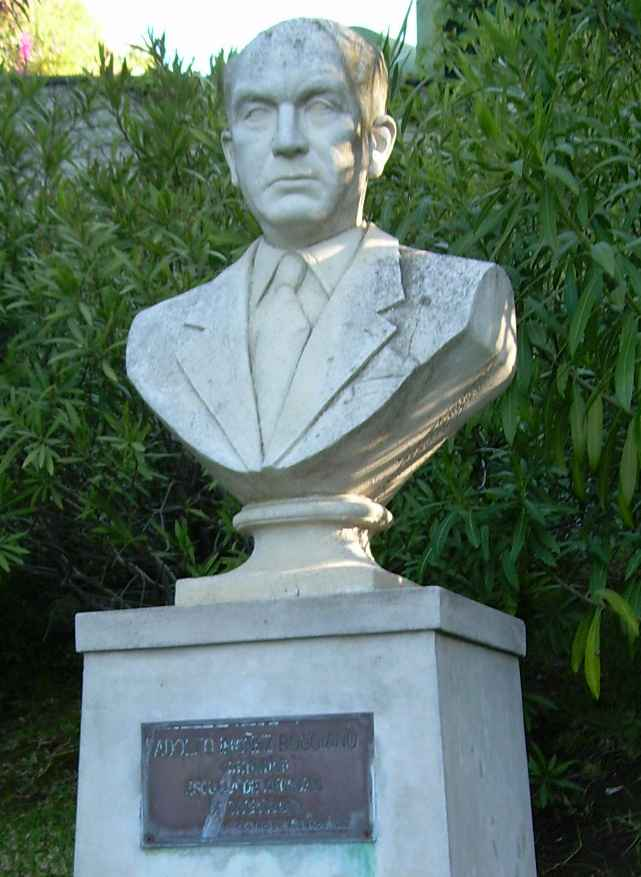
- Bust of Adolfo Ibáñez at Viña del Mar
- Born: 1880; Parral, Chile
- Died: 1949 (aged 68–69); Chile
- Spouse: Graciela Ojeda Rivera
- Children: Ana, Pedro, Graciela, Manuel and Ismenia
- Parent(s): Ana María Boggiano; Emiliano Galvarino Ibáñez

Adolfo Ibáñez Boggiano (1880–1949) was a Chilean businessman and politician affiliated with the Liberal Party (PL).

He founded businesses that later became Tresmontes Lucchetti and Walmart Chile, and served as Minister of Development during the first administration of President Carlos Ibáñez del Campo from 1927 to 1928.

== Biography ==
Ibáñez was born in Parral in 1880, the son of Emiliano Galvarino Ibáñez and Ana María Boggiano. At the age of fifteen, financial difficulties in his family led him to leave school and begin working. He was initially employed as a cashier for the newspaper El Sur in Concepción.

He married Graciela Ojeda Rivera, with whom he had five children: Pedro, Graciela, Manuel, Ismenia, and Ana.

In 1899, Ibáñez joined the commercial firm R. Gratau y Cía. After its dissolution in 1908, he became involved with the Valparaíso firm Enrique Bahre y Cía., which later operated as Bahre, Herbst y Cía. Following the departure of Pablo Herbst in 1914 and Enrique Bahre in 1925, Ibáñez took control of the business, which was renamed Adolfo Ibáñez y Cía.

During the 1930s, the company diversified into the food sector through Depósitos Tres Montes, a retail business established in 1918.

In 1944, Ibáñez's business interests were reorganized into three companies: Compañía Comercial e Industrial Tres Montes S.A., now Tresmontes Lucchetti; Ibáñez y Cía.; and Sociedad Comercial de Almacenes Ltda., which later became Distribución y Servicio (D&S) and eventually Walmart Chile.

== Political career ==
A member of the Liberal Party, Ibáñez became the first Minister of Development after the ministry was established by decree on 29 September 1927 under President Carlos Ibáñez del Campo. He remained in office until 22 February 1928 and was succeeded by Conrado Ríos Gallardo.

Ibáñez was also president of the Rotary Club of Valparaíso and of the Central Chamber of Commerce of Valparaíso.

== Legacy ==
Ibáñez died in 1949. In 1951, his heirs established the Adolfo Ibáñez Foundation, which led to the creation of the Valparaíso Business School in 1953. The institution subsequently developed into Adolfo Ibáñez University in 1988.
