= De la Concha =

De la Concha is a surname. Notable people with the surname include:

- Andrés de la Concha (fl. 1575–1612), Spanish painter of the Viceroyalty of New Spain
- Félix de la Concha (born 1962), Spanish and American painter
- Fernando de la Concha (1789–1794), governor of Santa Fe de Nuevo México
- Jacinto de la Concha (1819–1886), one of the early leaders in the Dominican independence movement
- José Gutiérrez de la Concha, 1st Marquess of Havana (1809–1895), Spanish noble
- José María de la Concha (1915–2005), Spanish sports leader
- Juan de la Concha Castañeda (1818–1903), Spanish lawyer and politician
- Mae de la Concha (born 1954), Spanish bookseller and politician
- Manuel Gutiérrez de la Concha, Marquis of the Duero (1808–1874), Spanish military commander and politician
- Manuel de la Concha (fl. 1815), colonel of New Spain
- Manuel Troncoso de la Concha (1878–1955), president of the Dominican Republic
- Rafael Macedo de la Concha (born 1950), Mexican army general and attorney general in the cabinet of Vicente Fox
- Víctor García de la Concha (born 1934), Spanish philologist

== See also ==
- La Concha (disambiguation)
- Concha (name)
- José Nicolás de la Cerda Concha Santiago (1767–1847), Chilean politician
