= Enrique Matta =

Chilean politician

Member of the Chamber of Deputies of Chile
- In office 15 May 1926 – 15 May 1930
- Constituency: 7th Departmental Grouping, Santiago

Personal details
- Born: 17 March 1900 Santiago, Chile
- Died: 23 August 1968 (aged 68) Santiago, Chile
- Party: Liberal Party
- Spouse(s): Enrique Matta Vial; Leonor Figueroa Larraín
- Children: 5
- Relatives: Emiliano Figueroa (uncle)
- Education: University of Chile

Enrique Matta Figueroa (17 March 1900 – 23 August 1968) was a Chilean lawyer and politician who served in the Chamber of Deputies of Chile from 1926 to 1930 as a member of the Liberal Party. He also served as Minister of Development and Agriculture in 1931.

== Early life and education ==
Enrique Matta Figueroa was born in Santiago, on 17 March 1900, to Enrique Matta Vial and Leonor Figueroa Larraín. He was educated at the Instituto Nacional and University of Chile.

== Career ==
Matta was admitted as a lawyer on 8 August 1924. He worked as a lawyer for the Goodyear Tire and Rubber Company and United States Rubber Company. He was an advisor to the newspaper La Nación in 1932, and the Caja de Crédito Agrario from 1932 to 1933. He was the head of the Chilean National Airline's legal department.

Matta was a member of the Liberal Party. President Carlos Ibáñez del Campo sent Matta into exile and he lived in Ecuador from 1927 to 1928. He represented the 7th department district in the Chamber of Deputies of Chile from 1926 to 1930. President Manuel Trucco appointed Matta as dual Minister of Development and Agriculture in 1931.

== Personal life ==
President Emiliano Figueroa was Matta's uncle. Matta married Marta Rogers Morandé, with whom he had five children; he married Adelina Larraín del Campo in Santiago on 2 March 1946. He died in Santiago on 23 August 1968.

== Works cited ==
- "Luis Raúl Puga Monsalve". Library of the National Congress of Chile. Archived from the original on 16 October 2026.
- Collings, Harry (1927). "Chile's New Anti-Bolshevist Government". Current History. 26 (1). The New York Times Company: 108–109. doi:10.2307/45332282. JSTOR 45332282.
