= Euroinnova International Online Education =

Spanish business school

- Type: Private
- Established: 2000; 26 years ago
- Students: 25,000 per year
- Location: Granada, Spain
- Website: euroinnova.com
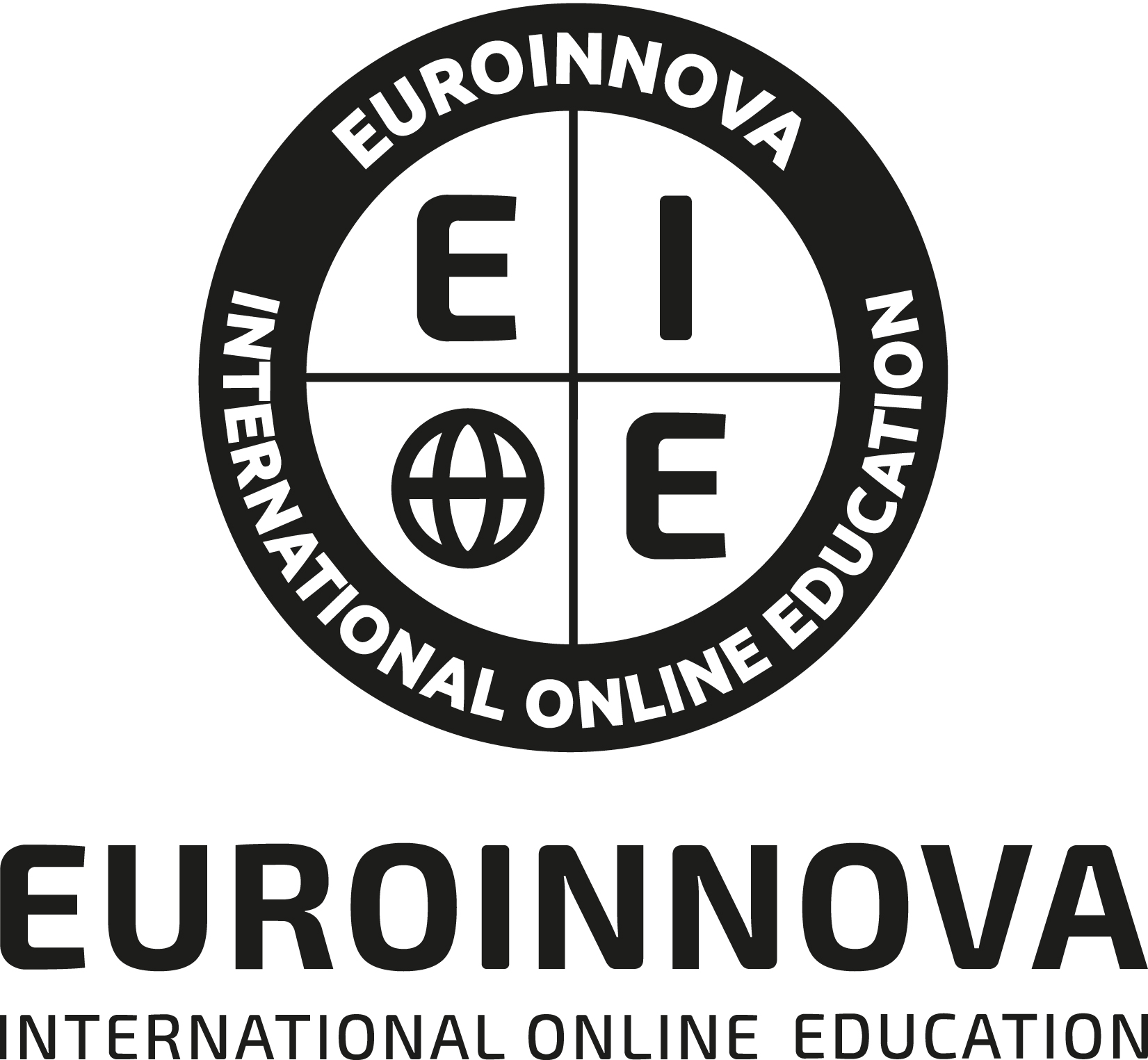

Euroinnova International Online Education is a Spanish business school specializing in online courses for further education up to a master's degree. It was founded in Granada, Spain in the year 2000. The school operates online and has a presence in a number of countries including Spain, United States, Argentina, Chile, Colombia, Mexico, Peru, and Venezuela.

== History ==
The business school was founded in 2000, in Granada, Spain.

Based on a 2014 report, Euroinnova reached 150,000 pupils divided into more than 70 different nationalities. Since 2010, Euroinnova on average enrolls more than 25,000 students per year. Students can also benefit from Euroinnova's Job and Internship Exchange program with Spanish or international companies.

By 2022, Euroinnova offered more than 19,000 online courses.

== Associations ==
Euroinnova International Online Education is an associated member of the International Commission on Distance Education (UNESCO), and collaborates with the Spanish Professional Association of Naturopathy and Biotherapy (APENB). Euroinnova is also Institutional Member of the Spanish Society of Education (SEP) and features Trust Mark Online.

== Partnerships ==
Euroinnova expanded its catalogue of courses and postgraduate studies by partnering with traditional educational institutions, such as the Spanish universities Catholic University of Ávila, Pontifical University of Salamanca and Universidad Católica de Murcia (UCAM), among a growing list of partners also from outside of Europe.
