= Absalón Valencia =

Chilean politician

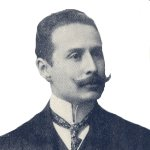

Absalón Valencia (20 July 1877 – 24 September 1950) was a Chilean politician. A member of the Liberal Democratic Party, he served in the Chamber of Deputies of Chile and the Senate of Chile.
