= Armando Jaramillo =

Chilean politician

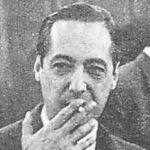

President of the Liberal Party
- In office 17 July 2000 – 3 May 2002
- President: Ricardo Lagos
- Preceded by: Adolfo Ballas
- Succeeded by: Dissolution of the party

Ambassador of Chile to Colombia
- In office 11 March 1990 – 11 March 1994
- President: Patricio Aylwin
- Preceded by: Carlos Negri
- Succeeded by: Juan Lira Bianchi

Member of the Senate of Chile
- In office 15 May 1961 – 15 May 1969
- Constituency: 5th Provincial Agrupation (O'Higgins and Colchagua)

Member of the Chamber of Deputies
- In office 15 May 1953 – 15 May 1961
- Constituency: 9th Departamental Group

Personal details
- Born: Armando Jaramillo Lyon; 8 November 1923 Santiago, Chile
- Died: 27 August 2002 (aged 78) Santiago, Chile
- Party: Liberal Party (1849) (1943−1966); National Party (1966−1973); Republican Party (1982−1987); Party for Democracy (1987−1997); Liberal Party (1998) (1998−2002)
- Spouse: María del Pilar Lira Ovalle
- Children: Three
- Parent(s): Armando Jaramillo Valderrama; Adriana Lyon Vial
- Education: University of Chile (LL.B)
- Occupation: Politician
- Profession: Lawyer

Armando José Domingo Jaramillo Lyon (8 November 1923 − 27 August 2002) was a Chilean politician who served as a member of the Senate of Chile. Similarly, he served as a member of the Chamber of Deputies of Chile.

From 1990 to 1994, he was the ambassador of Chile to Colombia. He was appointed in that charge by President Patricio Aylwin.
