= Matías Silva Sepúlveda =

Chilean politician

Matías Silva
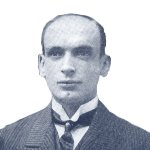
- Matías Silva Sepúlveda

Member of the Senate
- In office 15 May 1926 – 15 May 1930
- Constituency: 6th Provincial Grouping
- In office 4 July 1938 – 15 May 1941
- Constituency: 6th Provincial Grouping

Member of the Chamber of Deputies
- In office 15 May 1912 – 11 September 1924
- Constituency: Talca

Personal details
- Born: 7 February 1882 Talca, Chile
- Died: 7 February 1951 Talca, Chile
- Party: Liberal Party
- Other political affiliations: Democratic Party
- Spouse: Ana Barros Jarpa
- Education: University of Chile
- Occupation: Lawyer, politician

Matías Silva Sepúlveda (7 February 1882 – 7 February 1951) was a Chilean lawyer and politician. Initially a member of the Democratic Party and later of the Liberal Party, he served as deputy and senator of the Republic and held several ministerial posts during the presidency of Arturo Alessandri.

== Ministerial career ==
During the second presidency of Arturo Alessandri he held several cabinet positions. He served as Minister of Development from 30 October 1933 to 12 September 1936. He was also appointed Minister of Agriculture from 19 April 1934 to 26 August 1935 and later Minister of the Interior from 12 September 1936 to 18 May 1938, with some interruptions during his tenure.

As Minister of the Interior he submitted numerous legislative proposals to Congress, several of which were later enacted into law, including legislation on internal state security, the organisation of the Investigations Police and Identification and Passport services, and the expansion of the personnel of the postal and telegraph services.
