= Concha Ibáñez =

Spanish painter and writer (1926–2022)

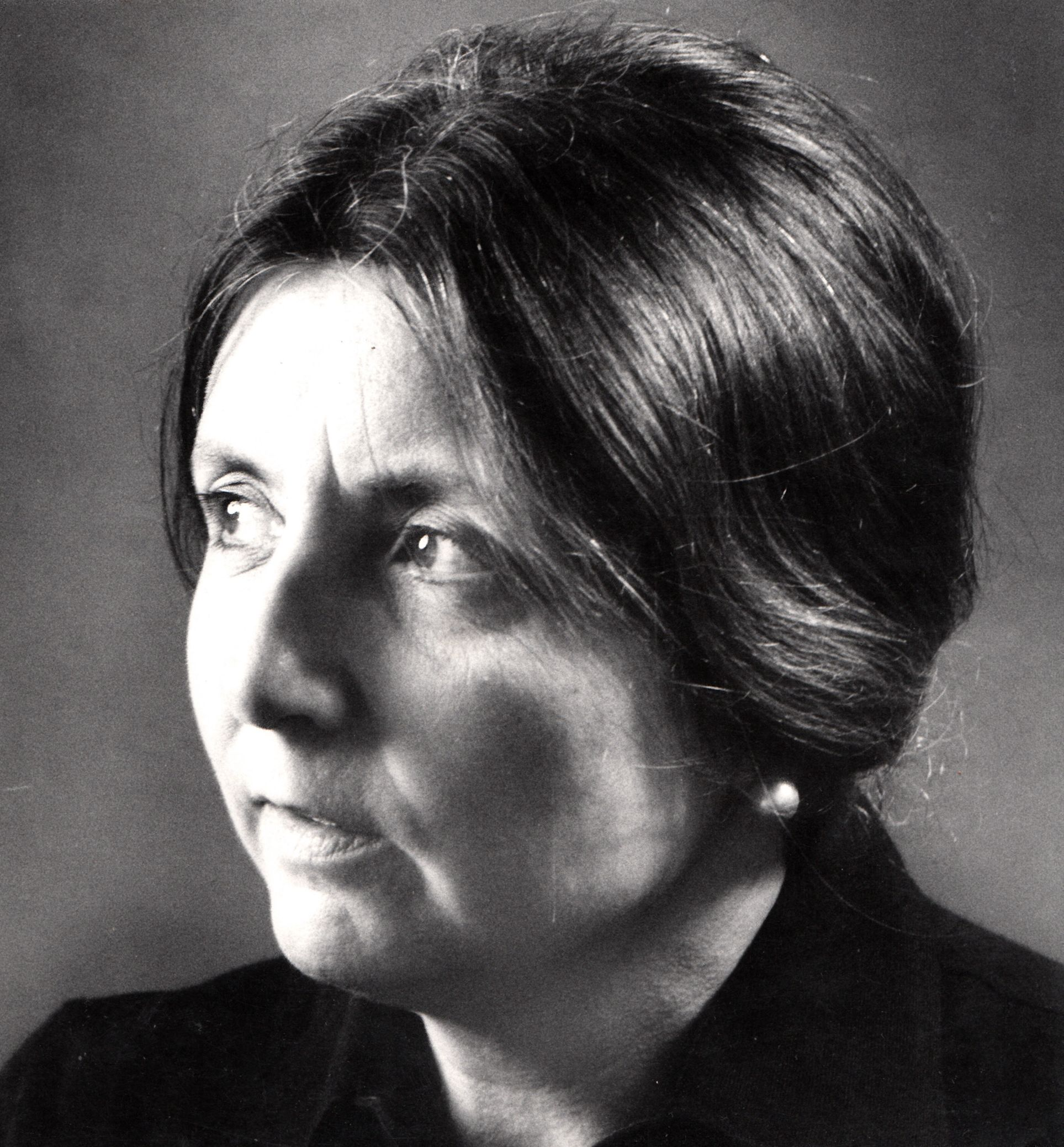
Concha Ibáñez Escobar

Concha Ibáñez Escobar (also, Conxa Ibáñez; 26 March 1926 – 22 December 2022) was a Spanish contemporary painter and writer. A landscape artist, she painted scenes in Catalonia, Castile, Andalusia, the Balearic Islands, the Canary Islands, Venice, Greece, Maghreb, Cuba, and New York City. Her illustrations in oil or engraving accompanied the works of the writers Baltasar Porcel, Miquel de Palol, Marta Pessarrodona, Cesareo Rodriguez-Aguilera, and Josep Maria Carandell.

Ibáñez died on 22 December 2022, at the age of 93.

== Sources ==
- Cadena, Josep Maria, et al. Concha Ibáñez. Tarragona: Contratalla Art, 2004. (in Spanish)
- Concha Ibáñez, reflexos de serenor. Barcelona: Associació de Dones Artistes Professionals de Catalunya, 2008. (in Spanish)
- Ibáñez, Concha. Una Fundació, una artista = A Foundation, an artist. Barcelona: Fundació Dr. Antoni Esteve, 2007. (in Spanish)
- Ibáñez, Concha; Pessarrodona, Marta. El Vallès. Sant Cugat del Vallès: Canals Galeria d'Art, 2009. (in Spanish)
- Ibáñez Concha; Marín, José Ángel. Quietud en libertad. Jaén: Universidad de Jaén. Servicio de Publicaciones e Intercambio Científico, 2009. ISBN 978-84-8439-435-8 (in Spanish)
- Marcos Molinero. Concha Ibáñez o el paisaje esencial. Madrid: s.n., 2004. (in Spanish)
- Palol, Miquel de; Ibáñez, Concha. Poemes i dibuixos. Barcelona: Taller de Picasso, 1983. (in Spanish)
- Pessarrodona, Marta; Ibáñez, Concha. Topografies. Girona: [s.n.], 2007. (in Spanish)
