= Concho Lake =

Waterbody in Apache County, Arizona

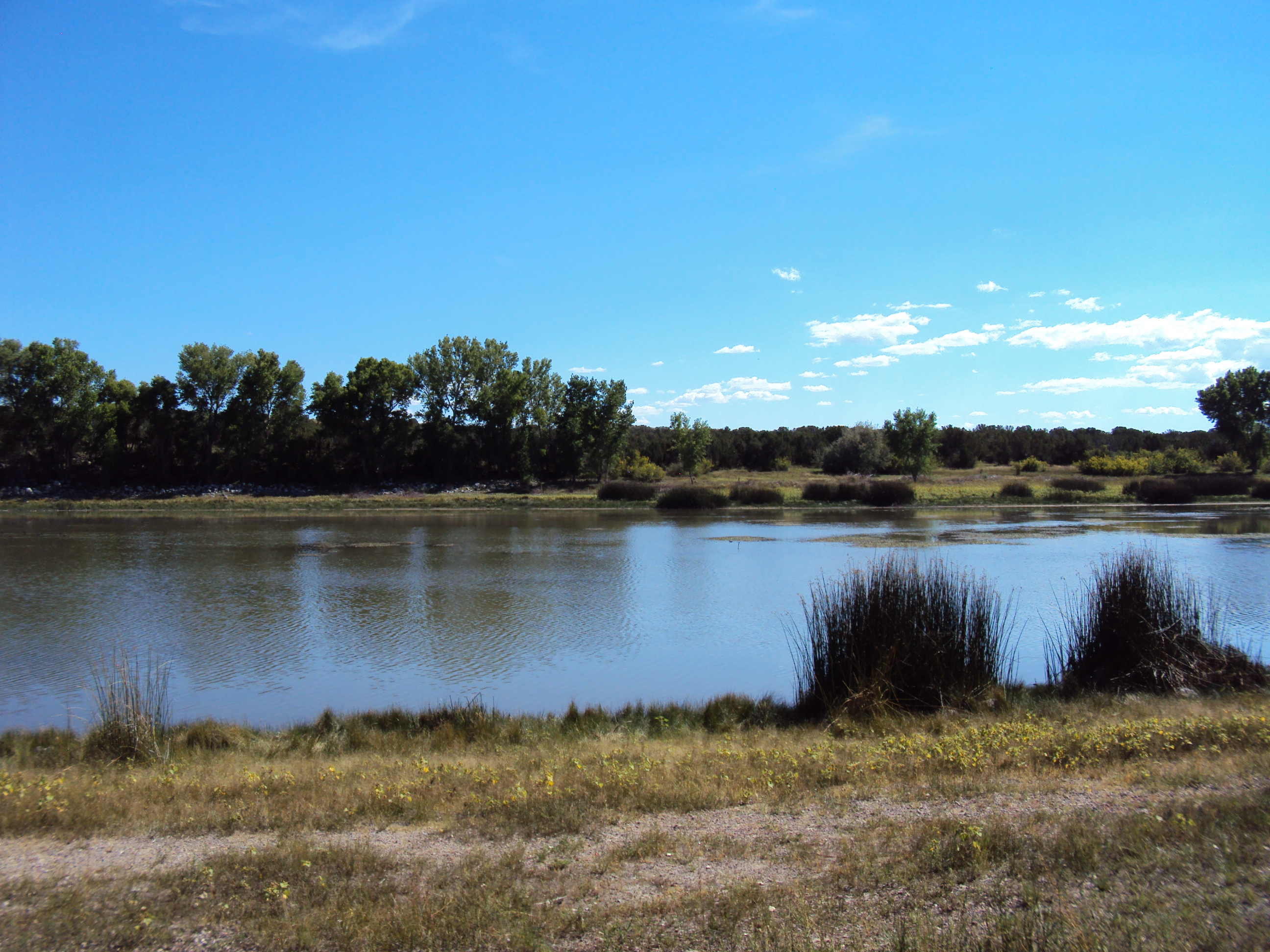
- Concho Lake- Concho Valley

- Location within Arizona
- Location: Apache County, Arizona
- Coordinates: 34°26′35.37″N 109°37′40.57″W
- Basin countries: United States
- Surface area: 60 acres (24 ha)
- Average depth: 6 ft (1.8 m)
- Surface elevation: 6,300 ft (1,900 m)

Concho Lake is an irrigation reservoir situated in the town of Concho, in the eastern Arizona grasslands at 6,300 feet (1,900 m). Much of the surrounding land is privately owned; the rest is owned by the Bureau of Land Management, but is managed for sport fisheries and wildlife resources by the Arizona Game and Fish.

== Description ==
Concho Lake is a small, shallow, weedy lake. It has 60 acres (24 ha) with a maximum depth of 16 feet (4.9 m) and an average depth of 6 feet (1.8 m). A small watershed and nearby spring feed the lake. Following current management plans, the Arizona Game and Fish stocks catchable-sized rainbow trout during spring months. Green sunfish and an occasional largemouth bass also occur at this lake. The lake gets drawn down considerably in the summer for irrigation.

== Fish species ==
- Rainbow
- Largemouth Bass
- Sunfish
