= Prudencio Lazcano =

Multi-hat Chilean

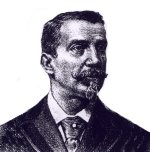

Prudencio Lazcano Echaurren (Santiago, 1850–1904, Valparaíso) was a Chilean lawyer, farmer, and politician. He served as ambassador, mayor and minister during the government of José Manuel Balmaceda.

== Biography ==
He was born in Santiago de Chile in 1850.

He was the son of former deputy Fernando Lazcano Mujica and Dolores Echaurren Larraín. He was the brother of Fernando Lazcano Echaurren; parliamentarian and presidential candidate in 1906.

He married María Délano Biggs in Santiago on January 25, 1878, and they had no children.

His studies were carried out at the Colegio San Ignacio and at the National Institute; in this latter establishment, he followed primarily the higher mathematics courses and in the university, the law courses. During his student days he was a member of various literary and scientific societies.

After finishing his studies, he dedicated himself for several years to agricultural work.

He was a member of the Liberal Democratic Party (PLD).

On May 24, 1888, he was named mayor of Santiago; at this time all municipal services were reorganized; the lifting of the map of Santiago was contracted, the potable water service was extended so that it would reach the working class; the transformation of the city, the rectification and widening of streets was studied; pavements and channels; the construction of hygienic neighborhoods for families of workers and all measures tending to the improvement of the working class were encouraged.

During the government of José Manuel Balmaceda he served as Minister of Industry and Public Works, from November 2, 1888 to January 21, 1889; he promoted all public works, such as railways, schools, hospitals, roads, bridges, the canalization of the Mapocho and others.

Some time later he was appointed extraordinary envoy and plenipotentiary minister of Chile in Bolivia, on January 21, 1889; he extraordinary envoy and plenipotentiary minister of Chile in the United States, on May 6, 1890.

When he was preparing to undertake a trip to Europe, he was appointed representative of Chile before the Inter-American Monetary Commission in Washington, in which he was elected president of the most important Commission of this Congress. He presented a technical paper on the monetary question.

The 1891 Chilean Civil War forced him to remain in his post as minister in the United States, supporting, in line with his duty, the constituted government of President Balmaceda.

He was elected senator for the department of Curicó in the Constituent Congress of 1891 for the period April 15-August 18, 1891. He did not take up that post because he was serving as minister, representing Chile in Washington D.C.

He returned to Chile at the end of 1891. Overwhelmed by the heavy work of the past few years, he retired to agricultural work to restore his broken health.

He died in Valparaíso in 1904.
