= Concha Peña Pastor =

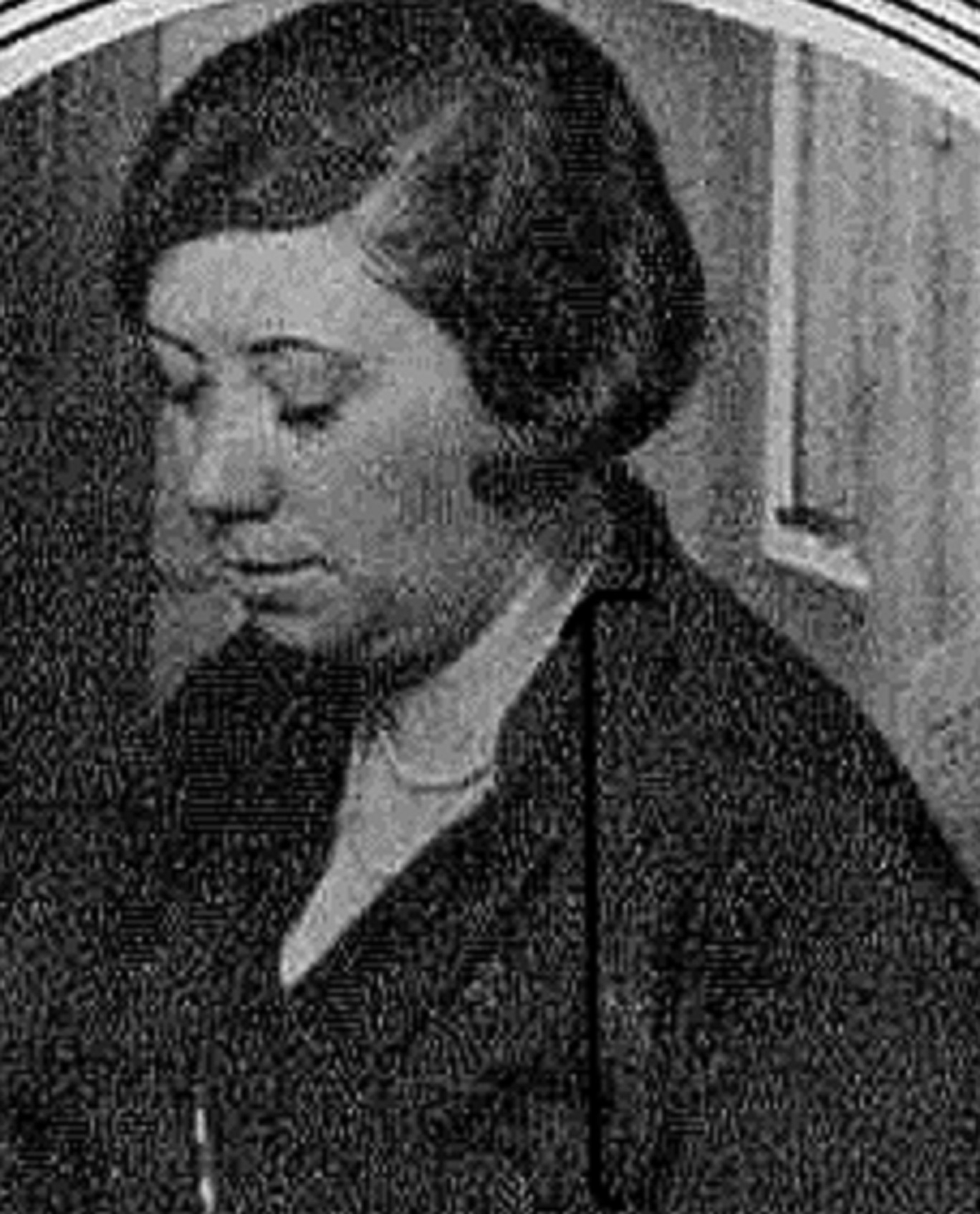
Concha Peña

Concepción Peña Pastor (Ciudad Real, November 9, 1906 - Panama, October 15, 1960) was a professor, graduated in philosophy, Law, Medicine, Doctor of Law, polyglot, lecturer.

She fought for women's suffrage and for women's rights. Exiled in Panama, she was a professor at the University of Civil Law (1941-1942) and Roman Law (1942 -1944) and deputy director of the National Library (1951), where she was involved in the recovery of the works of prominent politicians, intellectuals, writers, philosophers and artists.
