= Morín Contreras =

Chilean politician

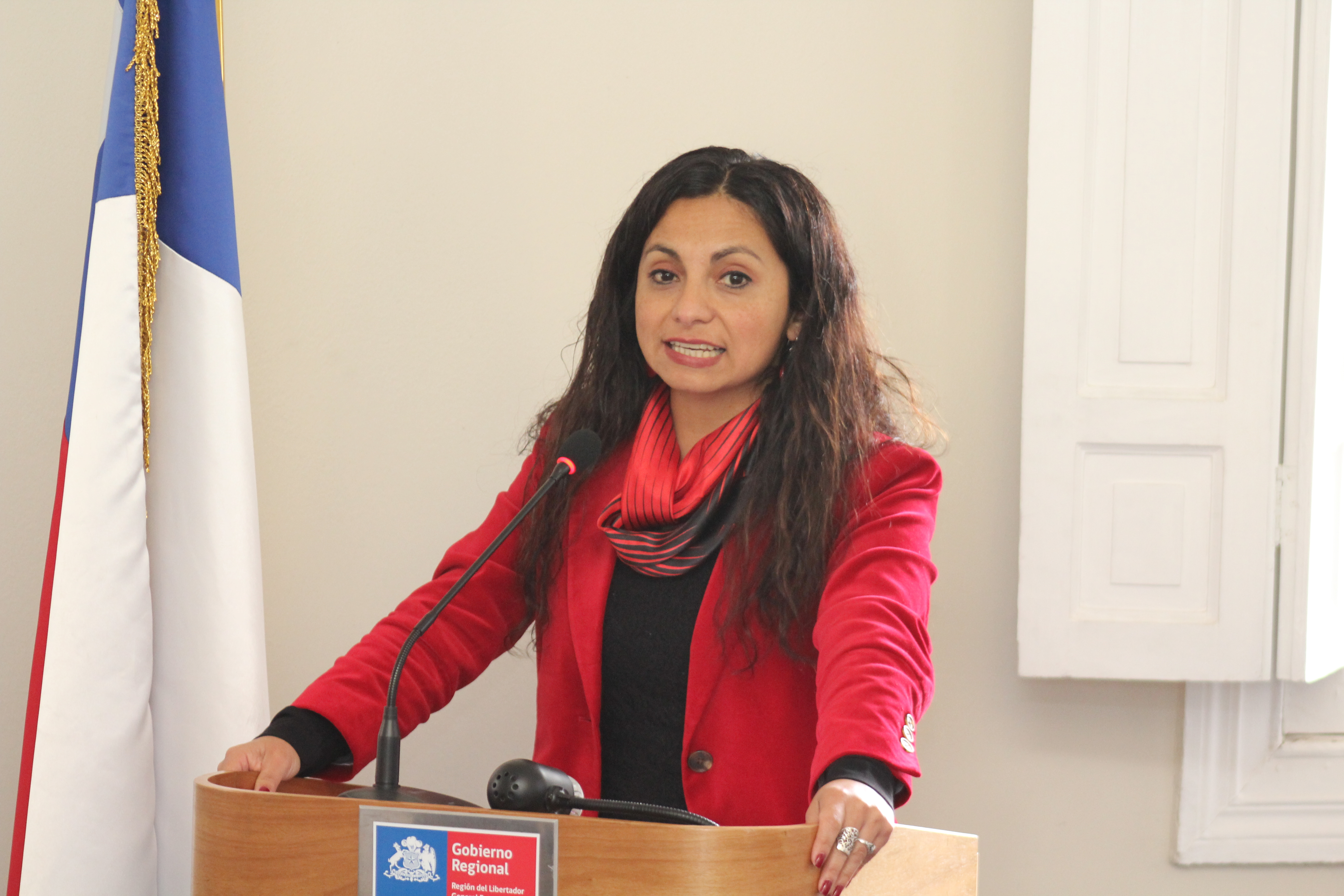

President of O'Higgins Region
- In office 11 March 2014 – 13 July 2015
- President: Michelle Bachelet
- Preceded by: Wladimir Román
- Succeeded by: Juan Ramón Godoy

Personal details
- Born: December 17, 1971 (age 54) Santiago de Chile, Chile
- Party: Socialist Party of Chile
- Education: University of Santiago de Chile
- Occupation: Accountant and politician
- Website: @MorinContreras

Morín Edith Contreras Concha (born 17 December 1971) is a Chilean accountant and politician, militant of the Socialist Party. She was the first female president of the O'Higgins Region during the second government of Michelle Bachelet, between 2014 and 2015.

She studied at the University of Santiago de Chile and was certified as an auditing public accountant.

She worked in the private sector, being an external auditor of Ernst & Young, between 1993 and 1995. In 1995 she settled in the city of Rancagua, where she served as internal auditor of Codelco's El Teniente Division in 1998.

She was Ministerial Regional Secretary of Housing and Urban Planning of the O'Higgins Region, between 2006 and 2010, and Director of the Housing and Urbanization Service (SERVIU) of the same region, in 2006. Later she was administrator of the Municipality of Malloa.

In March 2014, she became the first female mayor of the O'Higgins Region, appointed by President Michelle Bachelet. She was replaced by Juan Ramón Godoy in July 2015.

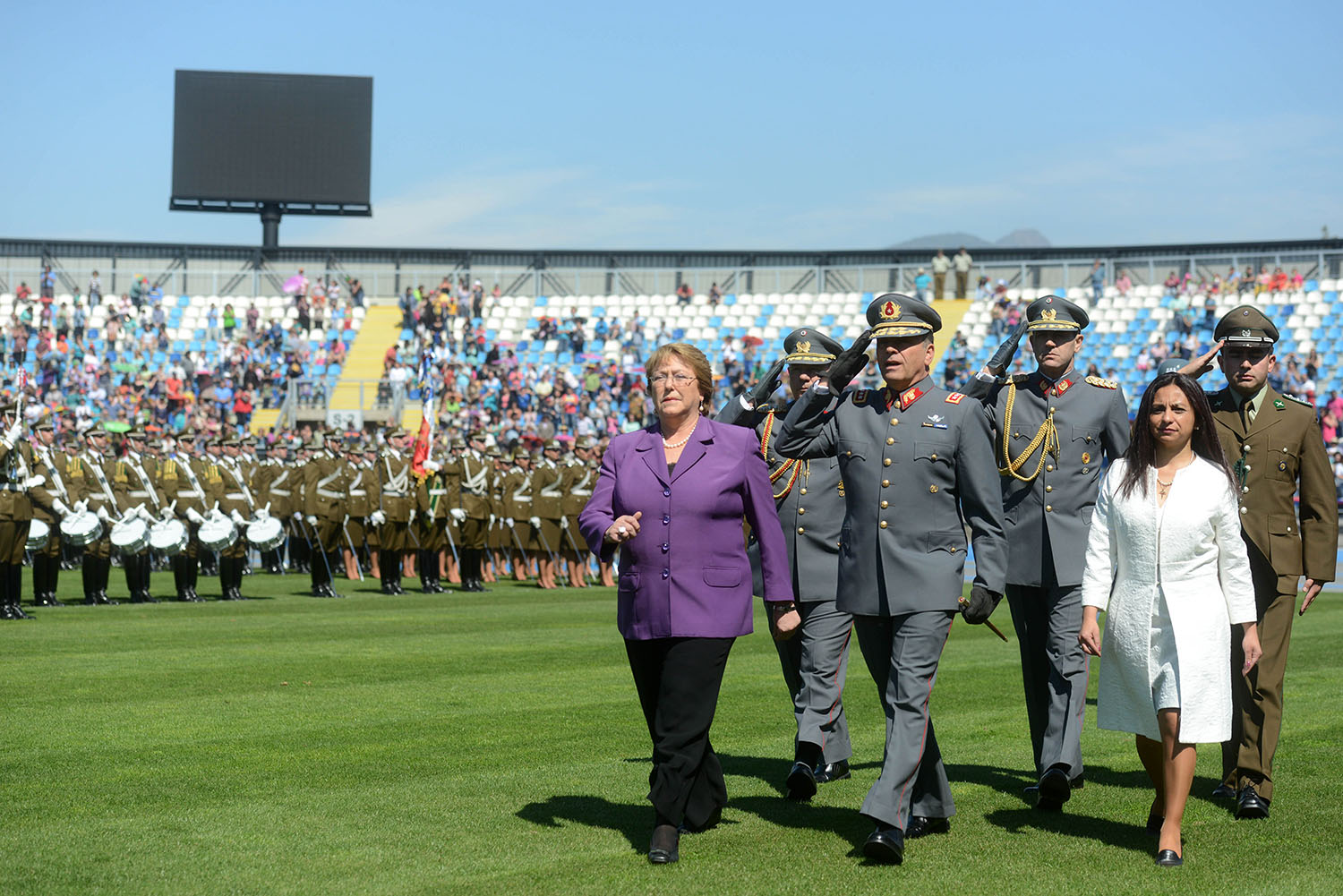
Contreras (in white) with President Michelle Bachelet in 2014.

In the parliamentary elections of 2017, she was presented as a candidate for deputy by district 16, corresponding to the provinces of Colchagua and Cardenal Caro.
