= José de Santiago Concha =

José de Santiago Concha may refer to:

- José de Santiago Concha, 1st Marquess of Casa Concha (1667–1741), Spanish politician
- José de Santiago Concha Jiménez Lobatón (1765–1830), Chilean politician
