= La Concha Beach Club =

- Alternative names: La Concha

General information
- Location: Marianao, Havana, La Habana Province, Cuba
- Opened: 1929

La Concha Beach Club (Spanish: Club de Playa La Concha), also known as La Concha, was a beach bar, restaurant, and private club in Havana, Cuba.

== Early history ==
La Concha Beach Club was established in 1929 in Marianao, a Havana suburb. The New York architectural firm Schultze & Weaver designed the beach club. It had a single tower, which resembled the original Madison Square Garden.

To access the private club's amenities and the public bathing beach of Marianao's swimming spots and sunbathing areas, the visitors paid a modest fee for each visit. La Concha had a diving platform with several diving boards.

It was part of a larger recreational area that included hotels, nightclubs, and restaurants. Beside the beach club within the extended cove stood the private Havana Yacht Club. The Havana Biltmore Yacht and Country Club was situated on the opposite side of the coastline, further to the west.

Following the Cuban Revolution, the building was seized and renamed after Braulio Coroneaux by the Castro government.
