= Enrique Zañartu Prieto =

Chilean politician

Enrique Zañartu
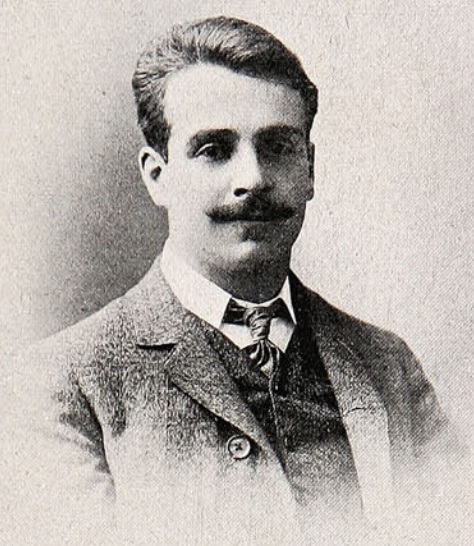

Member of the Senate
- In office 15 May 1926 – 6 June 1932
- Constituency: 7th Provincial Grouping
- In office 15 May 1918 – 11 September 1924
- Constituency: Concepción

Member of the Chamber of Deputies
- In office 15 May 1909 – 15 May 1918
- Constituency: Rere and Puchacay
- In office 15 May 1906 – 15 May 1909
- Constituency: Rancagua, Cachapoal and Maipo

Personal details
- Born: 25 December 1881 Santiago, Chile
- Died: 8 February 1943 (aged 61) Santiago, Chile
- Party: Liberal Democratic Party
- Spouse: Lucila Zenteno Valenzuela
- Education: University of Chile
- Occupation: Agriculturist, politician, writer

Enrique Zañartu Prieto (25 December 1881 – 8 February 1943) was a Chilean agriculturist, newspaper proprietor, writer and politician. He served as a member of parliament in Chile's Chamber of Deputies and later as a senator. Zañartu was also a Cabinet Minister in several national governments.

== Early life and education ==
Zañartu was born in Santiago on 25 December 1881. He was the son of Manuel Arístides Zañartu and María Rosa Prieto. His father was also a politician and government minister. His uncle was the former vice-president, Aníbal Zañartu Zañartu.

Zañartu attended secondary school at the Instituto Nacional (National Institute) and studied law at the University of Chile.

== Career ==
Zañartu owned an estate in the former department of Rere. He also purchased a newspaper La Mañana, closely aligned with the Liberal Democratic Party.

Zañartu was elected deputy for Rancagua, Cachapoal and Maipo in 1906. He was re-elected in 1909, 1912, and 1915 for the electorate of Rere and Puchacay.

Zañartu served as Minister of Industry and Public Works and later Minister of Industry and Public Works and Railways from 1911 to 1912 and again from 1913 to 1914. He also served as acting Minister of War and Navy in October 1913. He was also Minister of the Interior from 1916 to 1917.

In 1918, Zañartu became a senator for Concepción. In 1921, he became president of the Liberal Democratic Party.

Zañartu was re-elected as senator for Concepción in 1924. He was appointed Minister of Finance twice in 1924, but the National Congress was dissolved in September 1924 by a military junta.

In 1926, he was re-elected senator for Ñuble, Concepción and Bío-Bío but the National Congress was again dissolved in June 1932, this time following a socialist coup.

Zañartu served as Minister of Finance in 1932. During his term, he began printing money and suspended payment of Chile's national debt. However, vocal opposition to the latter policy led to him being replaced as finance minister by Ernesto Barros Jarpa.

Zañartu ran for president in 1932 but was bested by Arturo Alessandri.

== Works ==
Zañartu published several publications, including:

- Manual de Economía (1906)
- Manuel Arístides Zañartu, Luis Ríos y causas del pauperismo en Chile
- Crónicas de vulgarización del sistema monetario; and
- Hambre, miseria e ignorancia.

== Other activities ==
Zañartu married Lucila Zenteno Valenzuela. The couple had ten children.

Zañartu died in Santiago on 8 February 1943. He was 61.
