= Malaquías Concha =

Chilean politician (1859–1921)

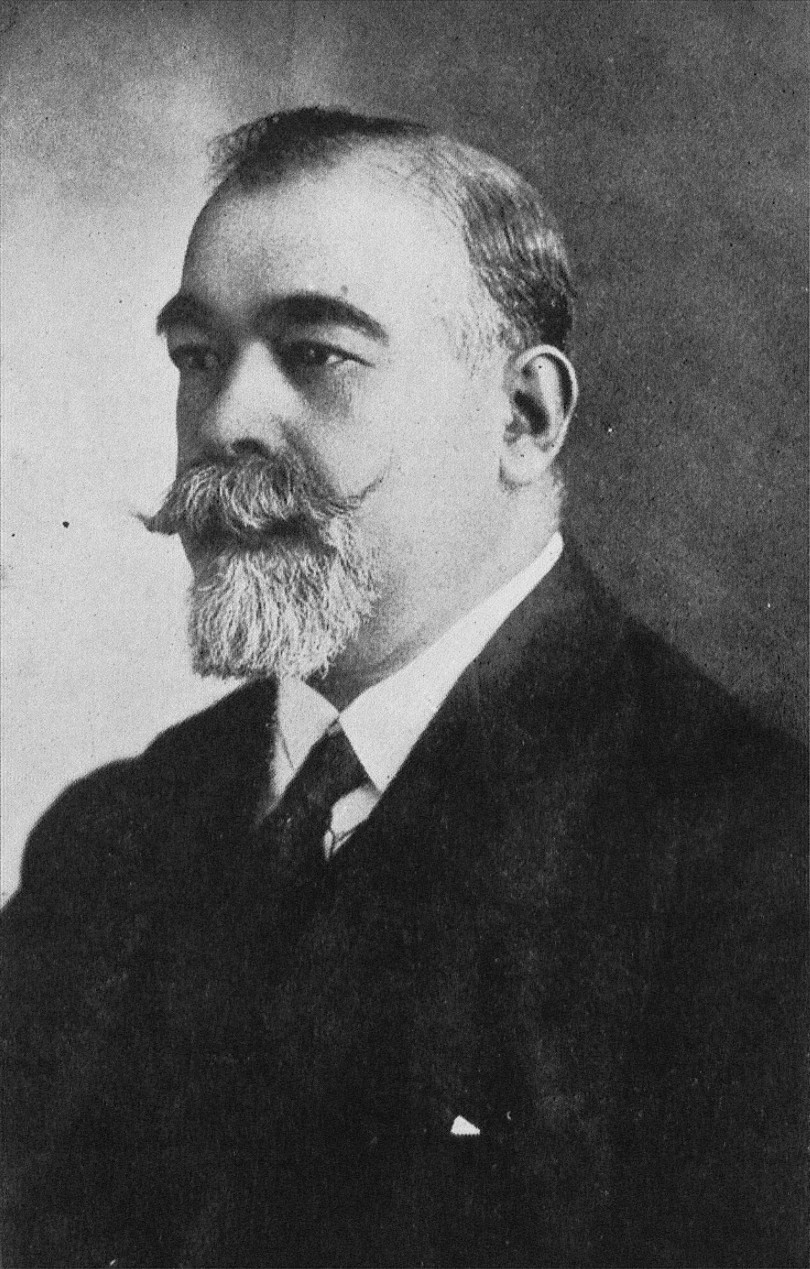

Minister of Industry and Public Works
- In office 1915–1915
- President: Juan Luis Sanfuentes

Member of the Senate
- In office 1918 – 5 August 1921
- Constituency: Concepción

Member of the Chamber of Deputies
- In office 1915–1918
- Constituency: Temuco, Imperial and Llaima
- In office 1897–1915
- Constituency: Concepción, Talcahuano, Lautaro and Coelemu

Personal details
- Born: Malaquías Concha Ortiz; 5 April 1859
- Died: 5 August 1921 (aged 62)
- Party: Democratic Party
- Spouse: Armandina Stuardo
- Children: 6
- Education: University of Chile
- Occupation: Lawyer, writer and politician

Malaquías Concha Ortíz (5 April 1859 – 5 August 1921) was a Chilean writer, lawyer and politician.

== Biography ==
His parents were Raimundo Concha Rodríguez and Juana María Ortiz Lobos. He studied at the Colegio del Padre Concha and the Liceo de Talca. He then moved to Santiago to study law at the University of Chile, graduating with a law degree on 24 December 1880.

== Political career ==
His political participation began during his university years. At the age of 22, he established his law practice and gained recognition and prestige for his dedication to defending people without the financial means to afford legal representation. He joined the Radical Party, but left it in 1887 to establish the Democratic Party. There, he promoted the democratization of political life through measures such as universal suffrage and secular, free education. His followers included workers and artisans who, under his leadership, promoted efforts to address the social question.

He supported President José Manuel Balmaceda during the 1891 Chilean Civil War. Following the defeat of the presidential side, he was prosecuted for conspiracy and imprisoned between 1891 and 1893. After regaining his freedom, he had to go into hiding due to frequent attacks by his opponents.

In 1896, his Democratic Party joined the Liberal Alliance. He later served as deputy for Concepción, Talcahuano, Lautaro and Coelemu (1900–1912), for Concepción (1912–1915), and for Temuco, Imperial and Llaima (1915–1918). In 1915, he was appointed Minister of Industry and Public Works during the presidency of Juan Luis Sanfuentes. He was elected senator for Concepción in 1918 and served in the Senate until his death in 1921.
