= Gonzalo Urrejola =

Chilean politician (1853–1940

Member of the Senate
- In office 1931 – 6 June 1932
- Constituency: 7th Provincial Grouping
- In office 15 May 1926 – 15 May 1930
- Constituency: 6th Provincial Grouping
- In office 15 May 1906 – 15 May 1912
- Constituency: Ñuble

Member of the Chamber of Deputies
- In office 15 May 1900 – 15 May 1906
- Constituency: Concepción, Talcahuano, Lautaro and Coelemu
- In office 15 May 1894 – 15 May 1900
- Constituency: Itata

Personal details
- Born: 4 November 1853 Concepción, Chile
- Died: 17 March 1940 (aged 86) Santiago, Chile
- Party: Conservative Party
- Spouse: Clara Unzueta Urrejola
- Occupation: Agriculturist, politician

Gonzalo Urrejola y Unzueta (4 November 1853 – 17 March 1940) was a Chilean agriculturist and politician of the Conservative Party. He served as deputy and later as senator of the Republic at various times between 1894 and 1932, being elected 7 times. He also served as the Minister of Industry and Public Works in 1907 during the presidency of Pedro Montt.

== Early life and education ==
Urrejola was born in Concepción on 4 November 1853, to Gonzalo Urrejola and Tránsito Unzueta. He completed his secondary studies at the Seminary of Concepción and later began studying law, but dropped out to instead manage a vineyard at Cuchacucha.

== Political career ==
Urrejola was first elected deputy for Itata for the 1894–1897 legislative term and was re-elected for the 1897–1900 term. He was later elected deputy for Concepción, Talcahuano, Lautaro and Coelemu for the 1900–1903 and 1903–1906 legislative terms.

Urrejola entered the Senate as senator for Ñuble for the 1906–1912 period and was re-elected for the following term beginning in 1912.

During the presidency of Pedro Montt, he served as Minister of Industry and Public Works from 18 June to 25 October 1907.

He was again elected senator for Talca, Linares and Maule for the 1926–1930 legislative term. He subsequently served as senator for the Ñuble, Concepción and Bío Bío for the 1931–1937 period. However, the National Congress was dissolved in June 1932 following the 1932 socialist coup.

== Personal life and death ==
Urrejola married Clara Unzueta. He died in Santiago on 17 March 1940.
