= Armando Jaramillo Valderrama =

Chilean politician (1886–1932)

Armando Jaramillo
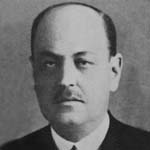
- Jaramillo in the 1920's

Member of the Senate
- In office 15 May 1926 – 6 June 1932
- Constituency: 5th Provincial Grouping
- In office 15 May 1924 – 11 September 1924
- Constituency: Talca

Member of the Chamber of Deputies
- In office 15 May 1915 – 15 May 1924
- Constituency: San Fernando

Personal details
- Born: 10 May 1886 Santiago, Chile
- Died: 29 December 1932 (aged 46) Santiago, Chile
- Party: Liberal Party
- Spouse: Adriana Lyon Vial
- Children: Armando Jaramillo Lyon
- Education: University of Chile
- Occupation: Lawyer, politician
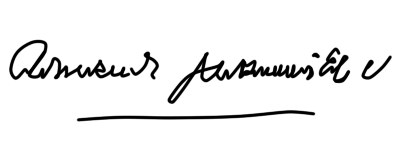
- Signature

Armando Jaramillo Valderrama (10 May 1886 – 29 December 1932) was a Chilean lawyer and politician. A member of the Liberal Party, he served as deputy and later as senator of the Republic and held several ministerial posts in the early twentieth century.
