= Liberal Party (Chile, 1998) =

Liberal Party Partido Liberal
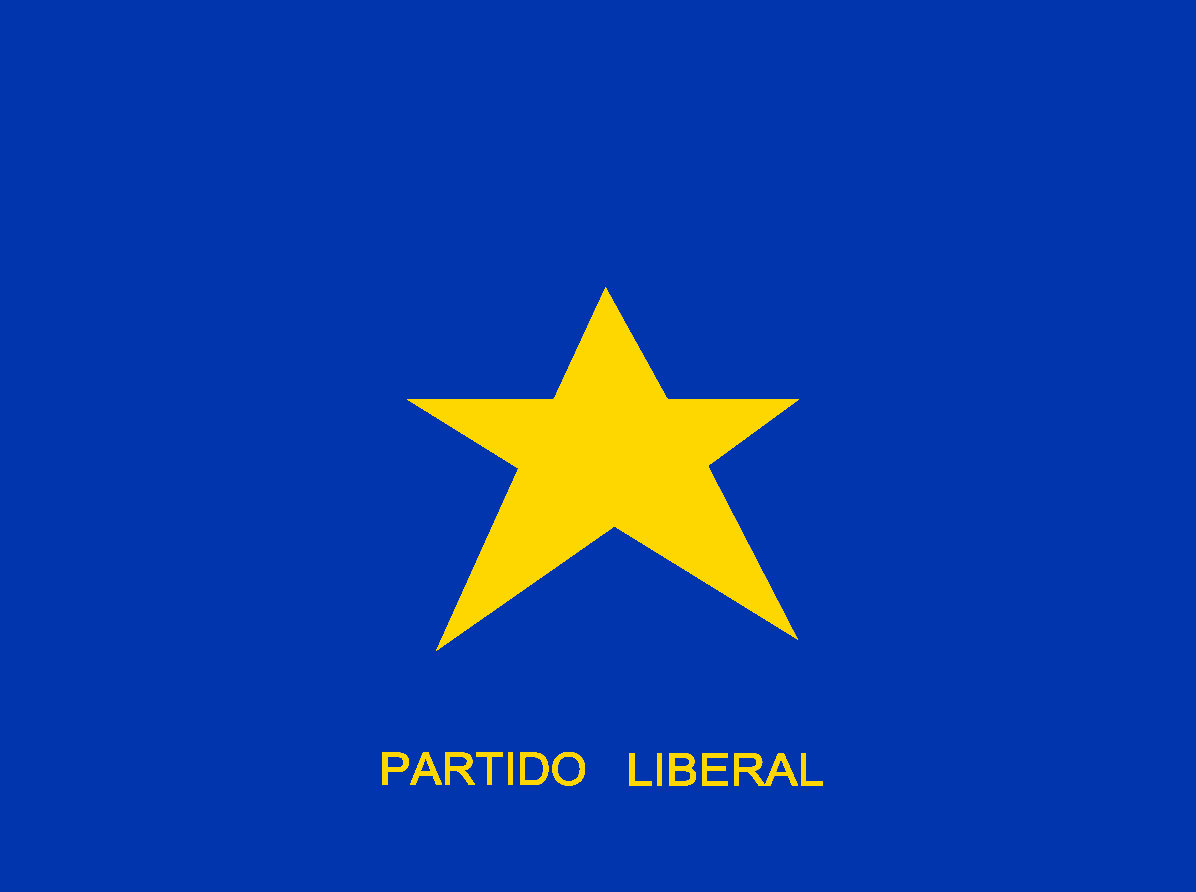
- Founded: 16 December 1998
- Dissolved: 3 May 2002
- Headquarters: Santiago, Chile
- Ideology: Liberalism; Social liberalism Progressivism
- Political position: Centrism

The Liberal Party (Spanish: Partido Liberal, PL) was a centrist political party of Chile that existed from 1998 to 2002.

== History ==
In December 1998, a group of young registered the Liberal Party (PL) in three regions of Chile, gathering more than 11,000 members. The registration process was conducted by Pedro Correa, Patricio Rosende and Waldo Carrasco. The new party adopted the slogan "To refound society" as a symbol and a yellow star on a blue background with the words "Liberal Party" at the bottom.

In 1999 the Liberal Party, then headed by Adolfo Ballas, decided to support the presidential candidacy of Ricardo Lagos, to which a dissident faction that formed the Democratic Liberal Movement, which supported the candidacy of Joaquín Lavín, then dissolve and integrate formed the National Renewal party.

The Liberal Party was re-registered as a political party legally constituted before the Electoral Service of Chile on March 17, 2000, after having taken steps to your re-enrollment in 1998. That same year was elected Armando Jaramillo Lyon as its president, and Party joined the electoral coalition Concertación for municipal elections.

In 2001 the Liberal Party signed its own list in parliamentary elections. Failing to 5% minimum, the party tried to save his life by a proposed merger with the Union of the Centrist Center (UCC) in March 2002, however, it did not have the unanimous support of the party, which did not materialize. Finally, registration was expired in the Electoral Service on May 3, 2002.
