= District 10 (Chamber of Deputies of Chile) =

Electoral district of the Chamber of Deputies of Chile

- Distrito 10
- Electoral District for the Chamber of Deputies
- Location of District 10 within Chile
- Commune: List: La Granja; Macul; Ñuñoa; Providencia; San Joaquín; Santiago
- Region: Santiago
- Population: 1,082,408 (2017)
- Electorate: 991,939 (2021)
- Area: 87 km^{2} (2020)

Current Electoral District
- Created: 2017
- Seats: 8 (2017–present)
- Deputies: List: Jorge Alessandri (UDI); María Luisa Cordero (Ind); Lorena Fries (FA); Johannes Kaiser (Ind); Helia Molina (PPD); Alejandra Placencia (PC); Emilia Schneider (FA); Gonzalo Winter (FA)

District 10 (Spanish: Distrito 10) is one of the 28 multi-member electoral districts of the Chamber of Deputies, the lower house of the National Congress, the national legislature of Chile. The district was created by the 2015 electoral reform and came into being at the following general election in 2017. It consists of the communes of La Granja, Macul, Ñuñoa, Providencia, San Joaquín and Santiago in the region of Santiago. The district currently elects eight of the 155 members of the Chamber of Deputies using the open party-list proportional representation electoral system. At the 2021 general election the district had 991,939 registered electors.

== Electoral system ==
District 10 currently elects eight of the 155 members of the Chamber of Deputies using the open party-list proportional representation electoral system. Parties may form electoral pacts with each other to pool their votes and increase their chances of winning seats. However, the number of candidates nominated by an electoral pact may not exceed the maximum number of candidates that a single party may nominate. Seats are allocated using the D'Hondt method.

== Election results ==
=== Summary ===
Election	Apruebo Dignidad AD / FA			Green Ecologists PEV			Dignidad Ahora DA			New Social Pact NPS / NM			Democratic Convergence CD			Chile Vamos Podemos / Vamos			Party of the People PDG			Christian Social Front FSC		
Election	Votes	%	Seats	Votes	%	Seats	Votes	%	Seats	Votes	%	Seats	Votes	%	Seats	Votes	%	Seats	Votes	%	Seats	Votes	%	Seats
2021	157,550	34.48%	4	27,196	5.95%	0	11,831	2.59%	0	48,140	10.54%	1				112,738	24.67%	2	18,672	4.09%	0	53,582	11.73%	1
2017	152,390	34.91%	3							63,935	14.65%	1	33,509	7.68%	0	168,105	38.51%	4						

=== Detailed ===
==== 2021 ====
Results of the 2021 general election held on 21 November 2021:

Party		Pact	Party									Pact		
Party		Pact	Votes per commune						Total votes	%	Seats	Votes	%	Seats
Party		Pact	La Granja	Macul	Ñuñoa	Provi- dencia	San Joaquín	Santi- ago	Total votes	%	Seats	Votes	%	Seats
Social Convergence	CS	Apruebo Dignidad	5,207	9,173	20,825	14,471	6,905	21,732	78,313	17.14%	2	157,550	34.48%	4
Comunes	COM	Apruebo Dignidad	2,541	3,603	9,005	6,015	2,669	11,680	35,513	7.77%	1	157,550	34.48%	4
Communist Party of Chile	PC	Apruebo Dignidad	2,251	2,563	8,635	2,393	2,615	7,264	25,721	5.63%	1	157,550	34.48%	4
Democratic Revolution	RD	Apruebo Dignidad	983	1,436	5,002	3,170	1,028	4,480	16,099	3.52%	0	157,550	34.48%	4
Social Green Regionalist Federation	FREVS	Apruebo Dignidad	291	255	323	159	261	615	1,904	0.42%	0	157,550	34.48%	4
Independent Democratic Union	UDI	Chile Podemos +	2,100	4,358	12,540	13,541	2,346	16,279	51,164	11.20%	1	112,738	24.67%	2
National Renewal	RN	Chile Podemos +	1,680	3,932	10,572	9,395	1,955	7,713	35,247	7.71%	1	112,738	24.67%	2
Evópoli	EVO	Chile Podemos +	1,215	2,459	7,397	8,903	1,167	5,186	26,327	5.76%	0	112,738	24.67%	2
Republican Party	REP	Christian Social Front	3,929	5,434	12,960	13,542	3,437	14,280	53,582	11.73%	1	53,582	11.73%	1
Party for Democracy	PPD	New Social Pact	633	1,914	6,498	5,494	1,044	4,751	20,334	4.45%	1	48,140	10.54%	1
Liberal Party of Chile	PL	New Social Pact	4,718	627	1,467	1,993	472	1,200	10,477	2.29%	0	48,140	10.54%	1
Christian Democratic Party	PDC	New Social Pact	1,319	1,031	2,553	2,103	544	1,919	9,469	2.07%	0	48,140	10.54%	1
Socialist Party of Chile	PS	New Social Pact	1,123	681	1,490	1,071	740	1,828	6,933	1.52%	0	48,140	10.54%	1
Radical Party of Chile	PR	New Social Pact	55	83	206	191	65	327	927	0.20%	0	48,140	10.54%	1
Green Ecologist Party	PEV		3,048	3,684	5,980	3,866	2,489	8,129	27,196	5.95%	0	27,196	5.95%	0
Party of the People	PDG		3,525	2,847	2,854	1,467	2,573	5,406	18,672	4.09%	0	18,672	4.09%	0
United Centre	CU	United Independents	1,790	1,733	2,457	1,362	1,548	3,572	12,462	2.73%	0	12,462	2.73%	0
Humanist Party	PH	Dignidad Ahora	740	772	1,147	631	635	2,419	6,344	1.39%	0	11,831	2.59%	0
Equality Party	IGUAL	Dignidad Ahora	604	698	1,218	663	605	1,699	5,487	1.20%	0	11,831	2.59%	0
Revolutionary Workers Party	PTR		867	828	998	496	772	1,905	5,866	1.28%	0	5,866	1.28%	0
Patriotic Union	UPA		698	623	834	363	690	1,452	4,660	1.02%	0	4,660	1.02%	0
Progressive Party	PRO		709	572	765	465	483	1,243	4,237	0.93%	0	4,237	0.93%	0
Valid votes			40,026	49,306	115,726	91,754	35,043	125,079	456,934	100.00%	8	456,934	100.00%	8
Blank votes			2,487	2,623	3,875	2,629	2,179	5,495	19,288	3.90%				
Rejected votes – other			2,735	2,475	3,254	2,092	2,229	5,612	18,397	3.72%				
Total polled			45,248	54,404	122,855	96,475	39,451	136,186	494,619	49.86%				
Registered electors			102,187	100,045	198,985	170,892	80,763	339,067	991,939					
Turnout			44.28%	54.38%	61.74%	56.45%	48.85%	40.16%	49.86%					

The following candidates were elected: Jorge Alessandri (UDI), 49,478 votes; María Luisa Cordero (RN), 20,617 votes; Lorena Fries (CS), 11,519 votes; Johannes Kaiser (REP), 26,709 votes; Helia Molina (PPD), 18,993 votes; Alejandra Placencia (PC), 18,048 votes; Emilia Schneider (COM), 26,180 votes; and Gonzalo Winter (CS), 66,794 votes.

==== 2017 ====
Results of the 2017 general election held on 19 November 2017:

Party		Pact	Party									Pact		
Party		Pact	Votes per commune						Total votes	%	Seats	Votes	%	Seats
Party		Pact	La Granja	Macul	Ñuñoa	Provi- dencia	San Joaquín	Santi- ago	Total votes	%	Seats	Votes	%	Seats
National Renewal	RN	Chile Vamos	3,706	6,966	23,484	16,940	4,118	15,696	70,910	16.25%	2	168,105	38.51%	4
Independent Democratic Union	UDI	Chile Vamos	3,115	4,824	9,121	12,592	2,905	16,935	49,492	11.34%	1	168,105	38.51%	4
Evópoli	EVO	Chile Vamos	2,759	4,038	11,014	15,406	2,798	11,688	47,703	10.93%	1	168,105	38.51%	4
Democratic Revolution	RD	Broad Front	8,058	12,239	27,732	18,768	8,916	37,500	113,213	25.94%	3	152,390	34.91%	3
Equality Party	IGUAL	Broad Front	1,628	2,312	7,104	4,458	1,479	8,395	25,376	5.81%	0	152,390	34.91%	3
Green Ecologist Party	PEV	Broad Front	1,056	1,365	3,454	2,461	852	3,505	12,693	2.91%	0	152,390	34.91%	3
Humanist Party	PH	Broad Front	120	137	262	141	100	348	1,108	0.25%	0	152,390	34.91%	3
Socialist Party of Chile	PS	Nueva Mayoría	2,455	4,036	11,304	4,640	3,576	6,712	32,723	7.50%	1	63,935	14.65%	1
Party for Democracy	PPD	Nueva Mayoría	1,809	2,278	2,361	1,916	4,306	3,949	16,619	3.81%	0	63,935	14.65%	1
Communist Party of Chile	PC	Nueva Mayoría	1,137	1,765	2,787	1,297	1,612	3,888	12,486	2.86%	0	63,935	14.65%	1
Social Democrat Radical Party	PRSD	Nueva Mayoría	153	213	422	364	254	701	2,107	0.48%	0	63,935	14.65%	1
Christian Democratic Party	PDC	Democratic Convergence	12,244	3,739	4,842	4,780	2,780	5,124	33,509	7.68%	0	33,509	7.68%	0
Progressive Party	PRO	All Over Chile	1,320	1,190	1,059	683	1,222	2,344	7,818	1.79%	0	7,818	1.79%	0
Dauno Totoro Navarro (Independent)	Ind		871	1,060	1,331	901	748	2,444	7,355	1.69%	0	7,355	1.69%	0
Patriotic Union	UPA		598	545	447	268	510	989	3,357	0.77%	0	3,357	0.77%	0
Valid votes			41,029	46,707	106,724	85,615	36,176	120,218	436,469	100.00%	8	436,469	100.00%	8
Blank votes			2,060	1,974	2,793	2,075	1,837	4,355	15,094	3.22%				
Rejected votes – other			2,620	2,247	3,386	2,071	2,042	4,986	17,352	3.70%				
Total polled			45,709	50,928	112,903	89,761	40,055	129,559	468,915	49.33%				
Registered electors			105,302	99,498	185,175	164,311	83,527	312,750	950,563					
Turnout			43.41%	51.18%	60.97%	54.63%	47.95%	41.43%	49.33%					

The following candidates were elected: Jorge Alessandri (UDI), 30,833 votes; Natalia Castillo (RD), 43,453 votes; Luciano Cruz-Coke (EVO), 38,143 votes; Maya Fernández (PS), 28,437 votes; Giorgio Jackson (RD), 103,523 votes; Marcela Sabat (RN), 54,630 votes; Sebastián Torrealba (RN), 10,196 votes; and Gonzalo Winter (RD), 5,237 votes.
