= María Luisa Cordero =

Chilean TV presenter

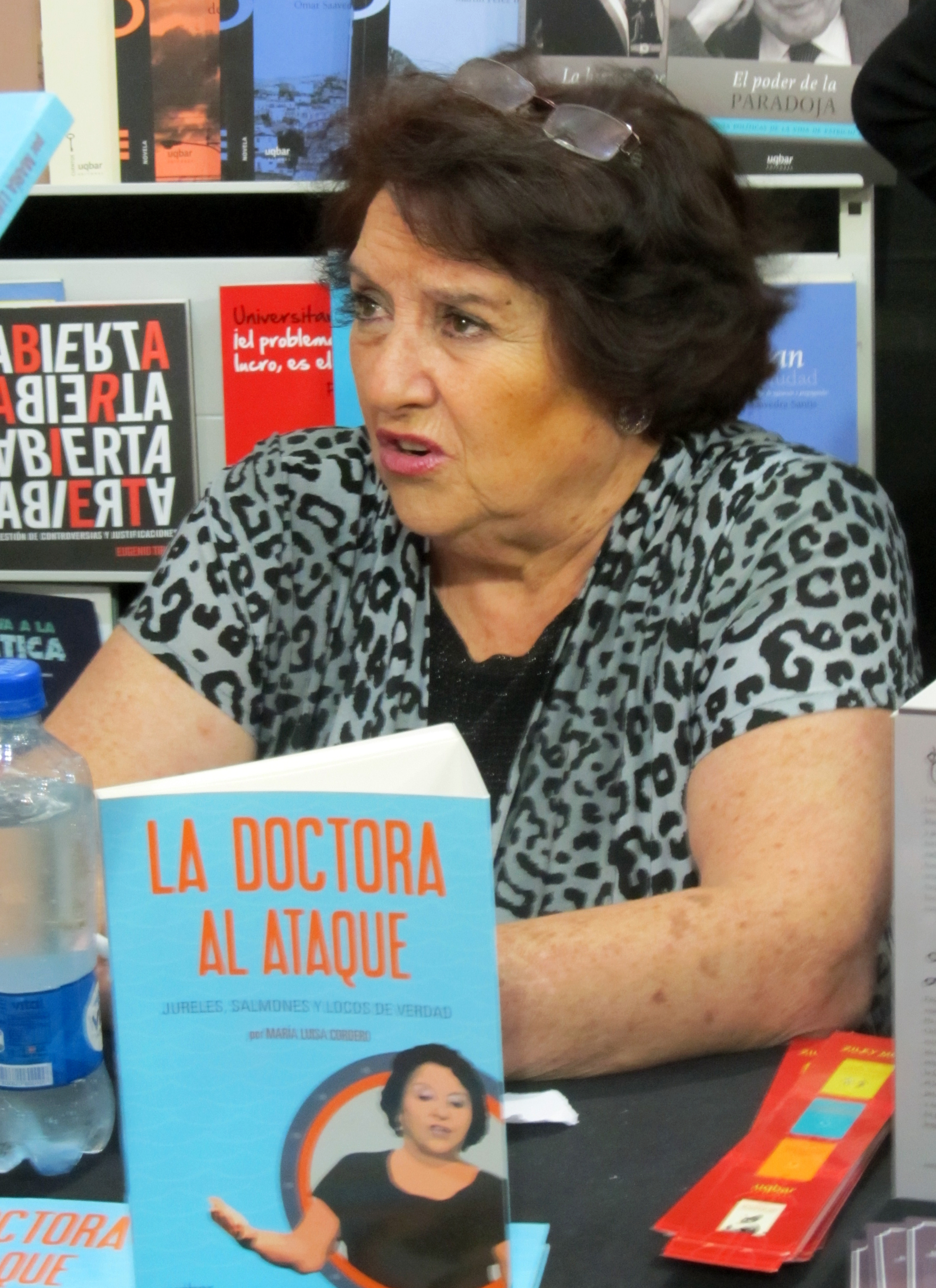

Member of the Chamber of Deputies
- In office 11 March 2022 – 11 March 2026
- Constituency: District 10

Personal details
- Born: 23 January 1943 (age 83) Puerto Montt, Chile
- Other political affiliations: Christian Democracy (1964−1983)
- Spouse: Jaime Laso (1969−1980)
- Children: Two
- Education: Pontifical Catholic University of Chile (B.Sc)
- Occupation: Politician
- Profession: Psychiatrist

María Luisa Cordero Velásquez (born 23 January 1943) is a Chilean psychiatrist, writer, television commentator and politician.

== Biography ==
She was born in Puerto Montt on 23 January 1943. She is the daughter of Melchor Cordero Matute and María Herminia Velásquez Oyarzún.

She is the mother of two children, Fernando and Jaime, and the grandmother of Renata and Mateo.

She completed her primary education in the city of Puerto Montt and graduated from secondary education at Liceo de Niñas No. 3 Mercedes Marín del Solar in Santiago in 1960. She later entered medical school at the Pontifical Catholic University of Chile, obtaining the degree of Surgeon Physician in 1968. Subsequently, at the same university, she completed two medical specialties: psychiatry and child psychiatry. She continued postgraduate studies in psychiatry and electroencephalography in Spain and the United Kingdom.

She devoted herself to the independent practice of her profession, working until 2004 at the Dr. José Horowitz Barak Psychiatric Institute, where she served as Head of the Encephalography Service.

In other professional areas, she worked in broadcasting media. Between 2001 and 2003, she co-hosted the radio program Cordero a punto on Radio El Conquistador together with Eduardo Fuentes. In 2012, she served as a panelist on the program Mundo real, hosted by Tomás Cox, and later joined the panel of the program Sentido común, where she has continued as a panelist alongside Juan José Lavín. She was also a panelist on the program Mentiras verdaderas on La Red and later joined the panel of Bienvenidos on Canal 13. In 2017, she became a panelist on the programs Síganme los buenos on Vive TV and Primer plano on Chilevisión.

In 2020, she joined the medical center “Lemuriano” as a psychiatrist, providing telemedicine services to patients during the COVID-19 pandemic. She concluded this work in March 2022 to begin her duties as a parliamentarian.

== Political career ==
During the 1980s, she engaged in professional union activity, eventually serving as treasurer of the Medical Association of Chile, an organization to which she belonged until June 2004.

In 2020, she announced her candidacy for the Chilean Constitutional Convention in the elections held in May 2021. She ran in the 12th District as an independent candidate on a list sponsored by the Independent Democratic Union. She obtained 15,095 votes, corresponding to 4.06% of the valid votes cast, and was not elected.

In August 2021, she announced her candidacy for the Chamber of Deputies of Chile in the parliamentary elections for the 10th District. In November, she was elected Deputy for that district—which comprises the communes of Santiago, Providencia, Ñuñoa, Macul, San Joaquín, and La Granja in the Metropolitan Region of Santiago—as an independent candidate on a list sponsored by National Renewal (RN) within the Chile Podemos Más coalition, for the 2022–2026 legislative period. She obtained 20,617 votes, equivalent to 4.51% of the valid votes cast.

She ran for re-election in the same district in the parliamentary elections held on 16 November 2025, as an independent candidate on a list sponsored by the Independent Democratic Union within the Chile Grande y Unido coalition. She was not elected, obtaining 14,530 votes, corresponding to 2.24% of the total votes cast.
