= Alejandra Placencia =

Chilean politician

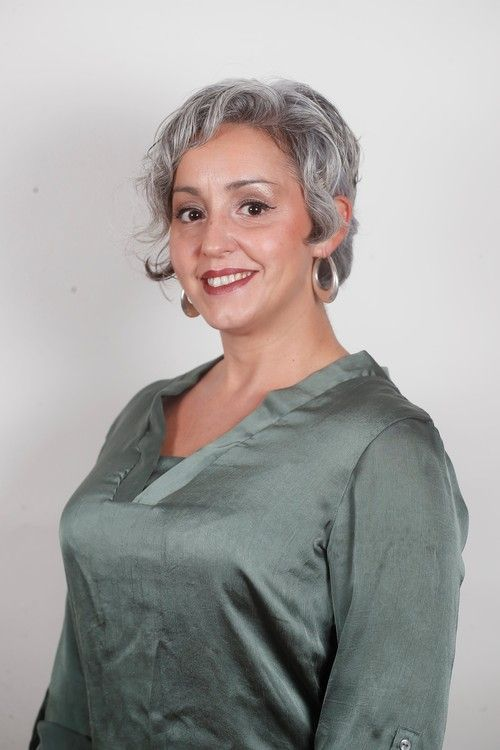

Member of the Chamber of Deputies
- In office 11 March 2022 – 11 March 2026
- Constituency: District 10

Councilwoman of Ñuñoa
- In office 6 December 2012 – 6 December 2021

President of the Universidad de Santiago Students Federation
- In office 2000–2001
- Preceded by: Cristián Rubio
- Succeeded by: Carlos Henríquez

Personal details
- Born: 14 February 1978 (age 48) Santiago, Chile
- Party: Communist Party
- Children: One
- Parent(s): Juan Placencia; Norma Cabello
- Education: University of Santiago, Chile
- Occupation: Politician
- Profession: Teacher of Philosophy

Alejandra Francisca Placencia Cabello (born 14 February 1978 in Santiago, Chile) is a Chilean philosophy teacher and politician affiliated with the Communist Party of Chile (PCCh). Since March 2022, she served as a member of the Chamber of Deputies, representing District 10 of the Santiago Metropolitan Region for the 2022–2026 legislative term. Previously, she served as a city councilor for the commune of Ñuñoa from 2012 to 2020.

She was president of the Student Federation of the University of Santiago, Chile (Feusach) between June and November 2000, and has been active in labor organizations, notably within the Chilean Teachers' Union and the Education Workers' Union of Ñuñoa.

== Early life and education ==
Placencia was born in Santiago to Juan Placencia Ortiz and Norma Cabello Quiroz. She graduated from the Methodist School of Santiago in 1995 and enrolled in philosophy education at the University of Santiago, Chile, earning her teaching degree in 2003.

== Professional career ==
Placencia taught philosophy at the municipal Liceo Lenka Franulic for 13 years beginning in 2002. She was elected president of the Ñuñoa branch of the Chilean Teachers' Union (Colegio de Profesores) in 2007, and in 2010 co-founded the Ñuñoa Education Workers' Union. She currently serves as Secretary-General of the Colegio de Profesores.

== Political career ==
Placencia joined the Communist Youth during her first year at university and became active in student movements for the democratization of public education in the 1990s. She was elected vice president of the Student Federation of the University of Santiago, Chile (Feusach) in 1999 and president in 2000.

In 2012, she was elected Ñuñoa councilor as an independent within the Por un Chile Justo coalition, receiving 3,614 votes (5.01%). In 2016, she ran in the Nueva Mayoría primary for mayor of Ñuñoa, placing second with 2,106 votes (26.91%). She was re-elected as councilor later that year with 4,998 votes (4.18%).

As councilor, she promoted the creation of a public pharmacy and chaired the Oversight Commission of the Municipal Urban Planning and Construction Department (Dirección de Obras Municipales), which reported irregular building permits, some later declared illegal by the Supreme Court.

In 2021, she ran for mayor of Ñuñoa but placed third. In the November 2021 parliamentary election, she was elected deputy for District 10—covering Santiago, Ñuñoa, Providencia, Macul, San Joaquín, and La Granja—with 18,048 votes (3.95%) as part of the Apruebo Dignidad coalition.

=== Legislative work ===
Placencia assumed office on 11 March 2022. She is part of the Communist Party–FRVS–Humanist Action–Independents caucus, serving as deputy head since May 2023.

She has served on the permanent committees of Education, Public Security, and Women and Gender Equality. She also took part in investigative committees on: the actions of the PDI high command; criminality in the southern macro-zone; and police conduct following criminal complaints against former Undersecretary Manuel Monsalve.

Her parliamentary work includes floor interventions, presentation of motions, legislative amendments, formal requests, and ceremonial resolutions.

== Personal life ==
Placencia is the mother of one daughter.
