= Andrés Palma Irarrázaval =

Chilean politician (born 1955)

Andrés Palma
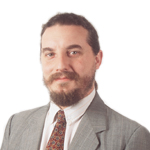

Minister of Planning and Cooperation
- In office 11 March 2006 – 14 July 2006
- President: Ricardo Lagos
- Preceded by: Cecilia Pérez Díaz
- Succeeded by: Yasna Provoste

Member of the Chamber of Deputies
- In office 11 March 1990 – 11 March 2002
- Preceded by: District created
- Succeeded by: Ximena Vidal
- Constituency: 25th District (La Granja, Chile, Macul and San Joaquín)

Personal details
- Born: 21 July 1955 (age 71) Santiago, Chile
- Party: Christian Democratic Party
- Spouse: Ana María Correa
- Children: Six
- Parent(s): José Ignacio Palma; Ana Irarrázaval
- Relatives: Joaquín Palma Irarrázaval
- Education: University of Chile (BA, (MA)
- Occupation: Politician
- Profession: Economist

Andrés Jaime Palma Irarrázaval (born 21 July 1955) is a Chilean economist and former politician, who also is a scholar. He has been columnist in media outlets like Ciper.

In March 2002 he was appointed executive director of the "Programa Chile Barrio" by President Ricardo Lagos, serving until 3 March 2003, when he assumed as Minister of Planning and Cooperation, a position he held until 1 October 2004.

He has served as consultant to the Ministry General Secretariat of the Presidency on matters related to state modernization (2004); to the EuroSocial Programme of the European Community; and to the Ministers of Finance and Economy on issues related to economic regulation and small business promotion (2005).

== Biography ==
=== Family and early life ===
He was born in Santiago on 21 July 1955, the son of Ignacio Palma Vicuña—descendant of the founders of the city of Vicuña and former senator for Coquimbo, as was his grandfather—and Ana Irarrázabal Donoso.

He is the brother of former deputy Joaquín Palma Irarrázaval and belongs to a family of prominent political figures.

In 1978, he married Ana María Correa López. He is the father of six children.

=== Education and professional career ===
He pursued his higher education at the Faculty of Economics and Administrative Sciences of the University of Chile, where he obtained the degree of commercial engineer. He later completed a Master's degree in Economics and worked as a lecturer at the same university until he was dismissed in 1980 by the military government.

Professionally, he served as consultant to the National Council for Food and Nutrition (CONPAN) between 1979 and 1980. He was also a researcher at the Center for Development Studies (CED) and became an expert in local development and anti-poverty policies.

In 2013, he joined the Department of Management and Public Policy at the Faculty of Administration and Economics of the University of Santiago de Chile (USACH).

== Political career ==
Between 1981 and 1984 he belonged to the Christian professional community "Padre José Vial." During the same period, he was appointed executive secretary of the Department of Laity of the Episcopal Conference of Chile and administrator of the East and West Vicariates of the Archdiocese of Santiago. In addition, from 1979 to 1984 he was a member of the Justice and Peace Commission of the Episcopal Conference of Chile.

He was founder of the Commission for Youth Rights (CODEJU) and was elected president of the Youth of the Christian Democratic Party. Between 1987 and 1988 he served as vice president of the Youth of the Christian Democratic Organization of America (ODCA). He was later appointed national counselor of his party.

In 1989 he was elected deputy for District No. 25 (Macul, San Joaquín and La Granja), Metropolitan Region, for the 1990–1994 term, obtaining the highest district vote with 83,715 votes (42.78%).

He was re-elected in 1993 for the same district (1994–1998), again obtaining the highest majority with 63,431 votes (34.79%). In 1997 he was re-elected for the 1998–2002 term, with 50,462 votes (33.18%).

In 2001 he ran for a fourth re-election but did not retain his seat in the Chamber of Deputies of Chile.

On 2 December 2008 he was appointed as representative of President Michelle Bachelet to the Board of Directors of Arturo Prat University, serving until 5 August 2010.

In July 2014 he was appointed Executive Secretary of the Educational Reform by Minister of Education Nicolás Eyzaguirre.

He has served as director of the Social Management and Public Policy Program of FLACSO Chile and as director of the Master’s in Management for Development at the same institution. He has also been a member of the Forum for Fair and Sustainable Development.

In 2023 he ran as candidate for the Constitutional Council representing the Christian Democratic Party on the "Todo por Chile" list in the Metropolitan Region. He was not elected, obtaining 0.95% of the vote.
