= Emilia Schneider =

Chilean politician (born 1996)

- Official 2026 portrait

Member of the Chamber of Deputies
- Incumbent
- Assumed office 11 March 2022
- Constituency: District 10

Personal details
- Born: 23 October 1996 (age 29) Santiago, Chile
- Party: Commons (formerly); Social Convergence (formerly); Frente Amplio
- Education: University of Chile (LL.B)

Emilia Schneider Videla (born 23 October 1996) is a Chilean activist and politician. She was elected to the Chamber of Deputies of Chile in the 2021 Chilean general election as part of the left-wing Commons party. She is the first openly transgender person to be elected to the Chamber of Deputies. She was reelected for the role in the 2025 Chilean general election.

== Biography ==
She was born in Santiago on 23 October 1996 to René Schneider Fernández and Paula Videla Bravo. She is the great-granddaughter of Chilean general René Schneider. She noted her family's reminiscing on her great-grandfather's "defense of democracy" (through his doctrine) as part of what got her involved in politics during her time in university.

She studied in the Colegio Latinoamericano de Integración, graduating from secondary education in 2014. She graduated from the Law program of the University of Chile in 2024.

She started her gender transition in 2017, following the release of A Fantastic Woman and the higher visibility of trans people in Chile around the time.

== Political career ==
=== Overview ===
She began her political involvement through social organizations linked to the feminist and student movements. In 2018, she served as spokesperson for Coordinadora 8M and played a prominent role during the feminist mobilizations of that year.

She was elected as interim president of the Federation of Students of the University of Chile (FECH) in 2019, due to low voter turnout. She was the first trans woman to preside over the FECH.

She was a member of the Comunes Party, where she served as vice-president between July 2021 and May 2022.

She ran as a candidate in the 2021 Chilean Constitutional Convention election, representing District No. 10 as part of the Apruebo Dignidad list, obtaining 12,533 votes (2.96% of valid votes), though she was not elected.

In November 2021, she was elected Deputy for District No. 10, representing the communes of Santiago, Providencia, Ñuñoa, Macul, San Joaquín, and La Granja in the Santiago Metropolitan Region, for the legislative term 2022–2026. She obtained 26,180 votes, equivalent to 5.73% of valid votes, becoming the first transgender person elected to the Chamber of Deputies in Chile.

On 21 December 2022, she resigned from the Comunes Party and announced her incorporation into Convergencia Social. Since July 2024, she has been a member of the Frente Amplio Party.

== Election history ==
Election history of Emilia Schneider
Year	Type	Territory	Pact	Party	Votes (%)	Result
2021	Constitutional Convention	District 10	Apruebo Dignidad	Partido Comunes	12,533 (2,96%)	Not elected
2021	Chamber of Deputies	District 10	Apruebo Dignidad	Partido Comunes	26,180 (5,73%)	Elected
2025	Chamber of Deputies	District 10	Unidad por Chile	Partido Frente Amplio	31,365 (4,8%)	Elected
