= Infocap =

Coordinates: 33°30′26.1″S 70°38′5.18″W

- Established: 1984; 42 years ago
- Type: Technical school
- Purpose: Education of workers
- Headquarters: Chile Santiago
- Location(s): Departmental 440; San Joaquin, Santiago, Chile
- Language: Spanish
- Rector: Arturo Vigneaux
- Affiliations: Jesuit, Catholic
- Website: Infocap

Infocap, Training of the Populace Institute, described as "the university of the worker," is an institution created by the Society of Jesus and inspired by the thought of Alberto Hurtado. Its mission is to train and educate workers.

== History ==
Infocap was established in the early eighties when Chile had high unemployment and few training opportunities. This led the Society of Jesus to create a training institution for technical workers. In 1990 the institution moved to its current headquarters located at Av. Departmental 440, San Joaquin.
