= José Ignacio Palma =

Chilean engineer and politician

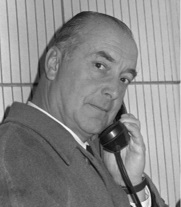

President of the Senate of Chile
- In office May 23, 1972 – May 15, 1973
- Preceded by: Patricio Aylwin
- Succeeded by: Eduardo Frei Montalva

Senator of the Republic of Chile for the 2nd provincial group, Atacama & Coquimbo Province
- In office 1965 – 1973

Deputy of the Republic of Chile for the 22nd dept. group, Valdivia, La Unión & Río Bueno
- In office 1953 – 1961

Minister of Lands and Settlement
- In office February 27, 1950 – February 4, 1952
- President: Gabriel González Videla
- Preceded by: Ciro Álvarez Brücher

Personal details
- Born: José Ignacio Palma Vicuña; March 9, 1910 Santiago, Chile
- Died: June 27, 1988 (aged 78) Santiago, Chile
- Party: Conservative (until 1939); National Falange (1939-1957); Christian Democrats (since 1957)
- Children: Andrés Palma Irarrázaval
- Education: University of Chile
- Occupation: Civil engineer & politician

José Ignacio Palma Vicuña (March 9, 1910 – June 27, 1988) was a Chilean engineer and politician.

== Studies ==
He studied at the Liceo Alemán, (German Lyceum) in Santiago and subsequently at the University of Chile, where he graduated as a civil engineer in 1939 with the thesis entitled "Tranque in Santa Cruz". He was president of the FECH (Federación de Estudiantes de Chile) in the period 1935–1936, and one of the founders of the National Falange on December 8, 1938, a party that would be the seed of the Christian Democrats.

== Political Office ==
He was Minister of Lands and Settlement of President Gabriel González Videla, within his coalition cabinet. After that he began his parliamentary career, being elected deputy for the constituency of Valdivia, La Unión and Rio Bueno, first in 1953 and then reelected in 1957. In 1961, the Christian Democratic Party supported him as a candidate for senator for the (then) southernmost senatorial district of Chile (the provinces of Valdivia, Osorno, Llanquihue, Chiloé, Aysén & Magallanes), but he failed in this bid. Four years later, in 1965, he ran again, this time in the district of Atacama & Coquimbo and was elected. He was second vice president of the Lower House and president of the Upper House.
