= Ximena Vidal =

Chilean actress and politician (born 1955)

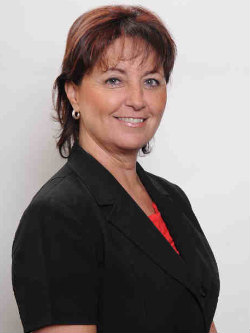

Member of the Chamber of Deputies
- In office 11 March 2002 – 11 March 2014
- Preceded by: Andrés Palma Irarrázaval
- Succeeded by: Ramón Farías
- Constituency: 25th District

Personal details
- Born: Ximena Leonor Vidal Lázaro; 1 January 1955 (age 71) San Antonio, Chile
- Party: Party for Democracy
- Spouse: José Caviedes (div.)
- Domestic partner: Ramón Farías (1986–2008)
- Children: 2
- Education: Pontifical Catholic University of Chile
- Occupation: Actress, politician, cultural manager

Ximena Leonor Vidal Lázaro (born 1 January 1955) is a Chilean actress and politician of the Party for Democracy.

She has had an extensive career in theater and television, and also worked in various cultural management positions. She was a member of the Chamber of Deputies for the 25th District – comprising the communes of La Granja, Macul, and San Joaquín – for three consecutive legislative terms, from 2002 to 2014. During that period, she participated in the permanent commissions on family; work and social security; education, culture, and sports; and human rights, nationality and citizenship.

Since 2014, she has held the position of cultural attaché at the Chilean embassy in Mexico.

== Biography ==
Ximena Vidal was born in the port of San Antonio on 1 January 1955, the daughter of Spanish immigrants Antonio Vidal and Libertad Lázaro. She married film and television director José Caviedes, with whom she had two children. They subsequently divorced, and Vidal was in a romantic relationship with politician Ramón Farías from 1986 to 2008.

She completed her secondary studies at the Ñuñoa Girls' High School No. 9, and studied sociology at the University of Chile. Later, she graduated as an actress from the Pontifical Catholic University. From 2006 to 2007, she completed a specialization course in economic, social, and cultural rights, and public policies.

In the late 1980s, she worked at the Estación Mapocho Cultural Center, where she managed and produced concerts, cultural meetings, plays, and seminars. She was also director of the Tourism Office of the Municipality of Santiago. Since 2014, she has resumed her work as a cultural manager and executive director of her film and television production company, Cuatro Caminos, which is dedicated to the production of digital animation, commercials, documentaries, and events.

In 1992, together with Farías, then mayor of San Joaquín, she participated in social work in that commune. From 1998 to 2001, she was director of the San Joaquín Solidarity Office. She joined the Party for Democracy, and has held the position of national councillor.

== Political career ==
In December 2001, Vidal was elected national deputy for the term 2002–2006, representing her party for the 25th District. She was a member of the permanent family commission, and presided over commissions for work and social security, and education, culture, and sports. Likewise, she participated in special commissions for the development of tourism, on citizen security, and in the investigative commission on the rights of workers.

In December 2005, she was reelected for the term 2006–2010. She was a member of the permanent commissions for work and social security, education, sports, and recreation, and human rights, nationality and citizenship. In addition, she participated in special commissions on electoral intervention, freedom of expression and the media, and tourism. She was a member of commissions of the Latin American Parliament (Parlatino) on science, technology and communication, and the Chilean-Ecuadorian and Chilean-Bulgarian inter-parliamentary groups, presiding over the latter.

In December 2009, Vidal was reelected again for the term 2010–2014. She was a member of the permanent commissions for culture and the arts, and labor and human rights. She participated in the Chilean-Spanish interparliamentary group and, in addition, was a representative of her party before the Euro-Latin American Parliamentary Assembly (EuroLat). She decided not to run for a fourth term in November 2013.

== Artistic career ==
In the 1970s and 1980s, Vidal devoted herself to acting, on stage and on television. At age 9, she made her debut on the Canal 13 series Esta es mi familia. Subsequently, she appeared in various shows on that channel, and on Televisión Nacional de Chile (TVN). In theater, she acted in the comedies Juani se Casa, Sainetes, Cosa de dos, and Cuéntale que lo hiciste conmigo. She has also worked in commercial cinema, radio drama, dubbing, and in commercials, both for radio and television in Chile and Ecuador.

=== Television roles ===
Year	Series	Role	Channel
1964	Esta es mi familia		Canal 13
1966	Ana de los Milagros	Hellen Keller	Canal 13
1970	Mi mamá y mi papá		TVN
1972	La sal del desierto	Magdalena	TVN
1975	María José		Canal 13
1975	J. J. Juez	Maiga	Canal 13
1976	Sol tardío	María Teresa	TVN
1978	El secreto de Isabel	Alejandra	TVN
1982	Celos	Clara Romero Echenique	Canal 13
1982	Anakena	Uka Tarongo	Canal 13
1984	Los títeres	Margarita	Canal 13
1984	La represa	Ana María	TVN
1985	La trampa		Canal 13
1985	Morir de amor	Irma Núñez	TVN
1986	Secreto de familia	Ximena	Canal 13
1987	La última cruz	Camila González	Canal 13
1997	Santiago City	Ester del Río	Mega
1999	La fiera	Dr. Paula Silva	
2014	Chipe libre	Alcaldesa Bonilla	Canal 13
