= Santiago Province, Chile =

Santiago Province Provincia de Santiago
- Province
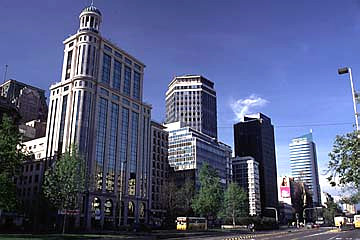
- Alameda del Libertador Bernardo O'Higgins, a large boulevard in downtown Santiago.

- Seal

- Location in the Santiago Metropolitan Region

- Location in Chile
- Coordinates: 33°25′S 70°33′W
- Country: Chile
- Region: Santiago Metropolitan
- Capital: Santiago
- Communes: List of 32

Government
  - Presidential Provincial Delegate: None

Area
  - Total: 2,030.3 km^{2} (783.9 sq mi)
  - Rank: 4

Population (2012 Census)
  - Total: 4,997,637
  - Rank: 1
  - Density: 2,461.5/km^{2} (6,375.3/sq mi)
- Time zone: UTC−4 (CLT)
  - Summer (DST): UTC−3 (CLST)
- Area code: 56 + 2

Santiago Province (Spanish: Provincia de Santiago) is one of the six provinces of the Santiago Metropolitan Region (RM) of central Chile. It encompasses the majority of the population of that region, including 31 of the 36 communities of Greater Santiago. The province spans 2,030.30 km (1,262 mi).

== Administration ==
As a province, Santiago is a second-level administrative division of Chile. As its capital is also the regional capital, the duties of the provincial delegate are instead carried out by the regional delegate of the Santiago Metropolitan Region who is appointed by the president.

=== Communes ===
The province comprises 32 communes (Spanish: comunas), each governed by a municipality consisting of an alcalde and municipal council.

Commune	Area (km^{2})	2002 population	Pop. density (km^{2})	Municipality website
Santiago (Capital)	22.4	200,792	8,963.9	link
Vitacura	28.3	81,499	2,879.8	link
San Ramón	6.5	94,906	14,600.9	link
San Miguel	9.5	78,872	8,302.3	link
San Joaquín	9.7	97,625	10,064.4	link
Renca	24.2	133,518	5,517.3	link
Recoleta	16.2	148,220	9,149.4	link
Quinta Normal	12.4	104,012	8,388.1	link
Quilicura	57.5	126,518	2,200.3	link
Pudahuel	197.4	195,653	991.1	link
Providencia	14.4	120,874	8,394.0	link
Peñalolén	54.2	216,060	3,986.3	link
Pedro Aguirre Cerda	9.7	114,560	11,810.3	link
Ñuñoa	16.9	163,511	9,675.2	link
Maipú	133.0	468,390	3,521.7	link
Macul	12.9	112,535	8,723.6	link
Lo Prado	6.7	104,316	15,569.6	link
Lo Espejo	7.2	112,800	15,666.7	link
Lo Barnechea	1,023.7	74,749	73.0	link
Las Condes	99.4	249,893	2,514.0	link
La Reina	23.4	96,762	4,135.1	link
La Pintana	30.6	190,085	6,211.9	link
La Granja	10.1	132,520	13,120.8	link
La Florida	70.8	365,674	5,164.9	link
La Cisterna	10.0	85,118	8,511.8	link
Independencia	7.4	65,479	8,848.5	link
Huechuraba	44.8	74,070	1,653.3	link
Estación Central	14.1	130,394	9,247.8	link
El Bosque	14.1	175,594	12,453.5	link
Conchalí	70.7	133,256	1,884.8	link
Cerro Navia	11.1	148,312	13,361.4	link
Cerrillos	21.0	71,906	3,424.1	link

== Climate and natural features ==
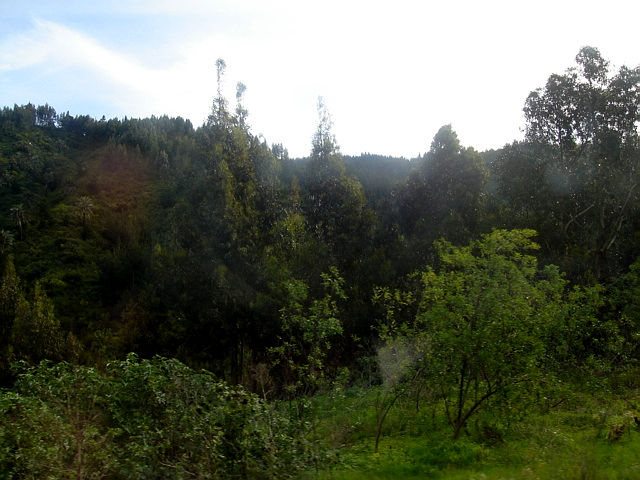
Forest surroundings of the Province

The climate of the Santiago Province, and generally of the Metropolitan Region is temperate Mediterranean cold, of the kind called continental. Precipitation is concentrated in the winter months, generally as snow over 1000 m above sea level and, in colder years, over the city of Santiago. Winter tends to be cold with frequent frosts during which temperature drops below 0 °C. The summer months are usually dry and hot. The Cordillera de la Costa acts as a climate screen and reduces marine influence, which makes the climate more continental. This situation becomes apparent when comparing precipitation from a coastal location such as Valparaíso (460 mm) with that of Santiago de Chile (360 mm).

The annual median precipitation reaches 367 mm on average. The annual median temperature comes out to 13.5 °C, with a median high of 21 °C and a median low of 6 °C.

Most of the province is made up of an extremely fertile, level prairie that the locals call la Depresión intermedia (Intermediate Depression). The terrain is known for its low elevation in relation to sea level and for being surrounded by hills, as well as emergent so-called island hills, such as Santa Lucía (an ancient extinct volcano), Blanco, and Renca, present today in the city of Santiago.

There is some occurrence of the endangered Chilean Wine Palm, Jubaea chilensis within the Santiago Province; this iconic tree of central Chile had a much larger range prehistorically, before the decimation of much of its habitat by the expanding human population.

== Demographics ==
=== History ===
Before the Iberian conquest, the central zone of Chile was sparsely inhabited by an indigenous population of Picunches, the northern branch of the Mapuches. The European occupation had a considerable impact on the native population and culture, which suffered a rapid and profound disintegration. Chief among the reasons was the Spanish Crown's granting of gifts of land to its colonists. In addition, the institution of a system of encomiendas, only abolished by the end of the 18th century, had irreversible consequences. It represented first the appropriation of indigenous ground, and second the practice of Spaniards receiving groups of natives who had to pay tribute. Over time, in the Province, as in the whole country, cultural identity became predominantly European in character, with minor hints of native character, thus setting in motion a process of homogenization of the population.

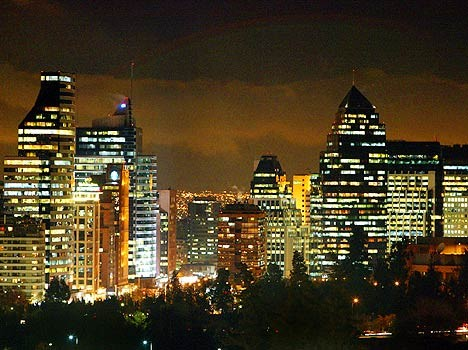
The city of Santiago at night

=== Population ===
According to the census of 2002, Santiago Province has 4,668,473 inhabitants, of whom 2,244,497 are male and 2,423,976 female, meaning that the number of males is 92.6% that of females. The population density is the highest in Chile, with 2,999.4 inhabitants/km^{2}; the most densely populated comuna is that of Lo Prado and the most populous is La Florida, a suburb of the capital. In 2002, there were 4,658,687 persons living in urban areas and 9,786 persons living in rural areas, classifying 99.79% of the population as urban. The annual population growth rate is calculated for 2005 as 0.9%. Life expectancy is exactly the Chilean national average, which is the highest national life expectancy in Latin America: 80 years on average, 78 for men and 82 for women. The area has an average household income of $29,062 in PPP US dollars (2000).

The population tends to be concentrated evenly between the heart of the city and the suburbs, due to government promotion of populating urban centers in high-rise buildings by offering state subsidies, thereby avoiding the progressive extension of Greater Santiago.

== Economy ==
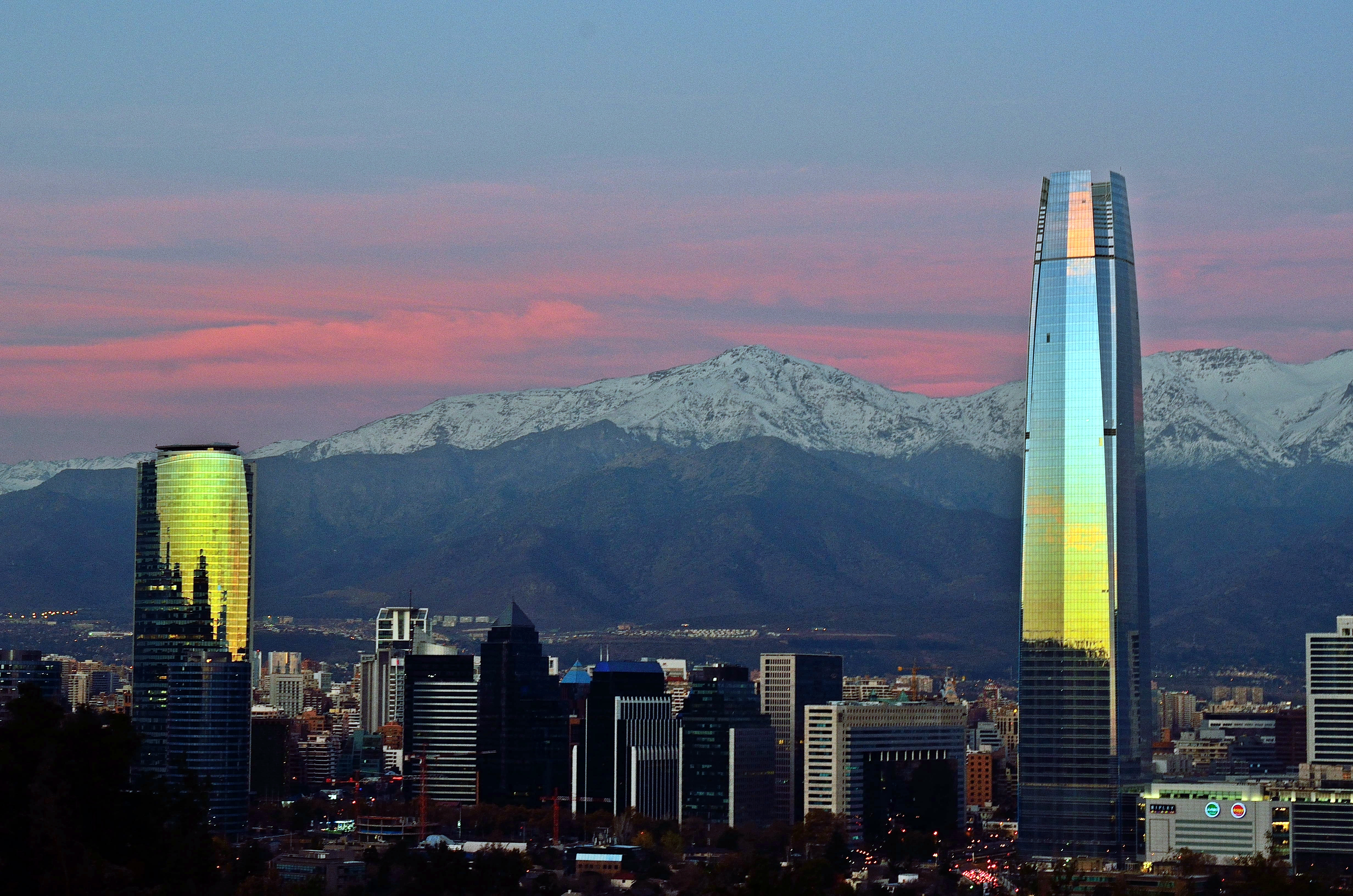
The financial district in Santiago de Chile

Santiago Province's economic activity produces about 30% of the country's total income; a high number due to both having the capital of the country within its area and to its central location. The "primary" or agricultural sector represents less than 3.5% of the economic activity according to the census, a figure that has remained virtually unchanged during the first few years of the 21st century. The "secondary" or industrial sector contributes 21% of the region's GDP. Finally, the tertiary or service sector fluctuates around 76% of regional GDP. This province stands out for its industrial predominance, but most of all, for its service sector. Industry is widely diverse and along with Valparaíso and Biobío regions, it is one of the country's three industrial pillars. Machinery and electronic equipment, leather, food processing, chemical and metallurgical industry are Santiago Province's most important industries. The predominance of the service sector can be explained by the activity from the following industries, among others: electricity, gas, water, construction, commerce, transportation and communication, financial services, housing, education, health, and public administration.

== Transportation and communication ==
Because Santiago Province includes the city of Santiago, the network of roads are important elements in the province's transportation system. The principal north-south routes are:

Route 5 (Autopista Central)

The basepoint for numbering the kilometers of the "Central Highway", the Chilean portion of the Panamerican Highway is in Santiago Province. This Kilometer Zero falls at the intersection with the Alameda del Libertador Bernardo O'Higgins. The highway, nicknamed "Norte-Sur" ("North-South"), consists of quality pavement and two- and three-lane roads.

Route 68

This route links Santiago with Valparaíso, Viña del Mar, and the summer resorts and beaches in the fifth region of Valparaíso. In addition, it connects the towns of Casablanca and Curacaví. The toll highway, consisting of two- and three-lane sections of well-maintained pavement, extends for 115 kilometers.

Route 78 (Autopista del Sol)

The "Highway of the Sun" is a toll road that links Santiago with San Antonio, and from there connects to other coastal towns including Llolleo, Cartagena, El Quisco, and Algarrobo. It also connects to the more central Melipilla, Talagante, El Monte, Padre Hurtado and Peñaflor. Route 78 extends 110 kilometers.

Route G-21

This 40 kilometer route joins Santiago with the winter resort towns of Farellones and Valle Nevado.

Route G-25

This route connects Santiago and the province of Puente Alto with Cajón del Maipo. It extends roughly 70 km to its termination in the town of El Volcán.

== Roads and railways ==
Other important highways in Santiago province are its network of Autopistas Urbanas (urban highways). Santiago's first toll roads began to operate near the end of 2004. The tolls for uctronic payment system called Televía or TAG. Vehicles must carry TAG devices to use the highways.

The main highways in Santiago province are:

- Autopista Central
- Autopista Costanera Norte
- Autopista Vespucio Norte Express
- Autopista Vespucio Sur

The province's railroads are a vital form of daily mass transit. They are operated by the state agency EFE. It provides a continuous railroad between the cities of Valparaíso in Valparaíso and Puerto Montt in Los Lagos. The trains of Metrotrén connect the outlying suburbs with the capital. Another important mode of transportation in the city is the Santiago Metro, a subway system. The five train lines carry an average of one million people daily, making the metro one of the leading means of transportation in the entire country. In one year, the metro services over 360 million people. Both the metro and the railroad system are considered the most modern in Latin America. The Transantiago bus system is also important.

== Gallery ==
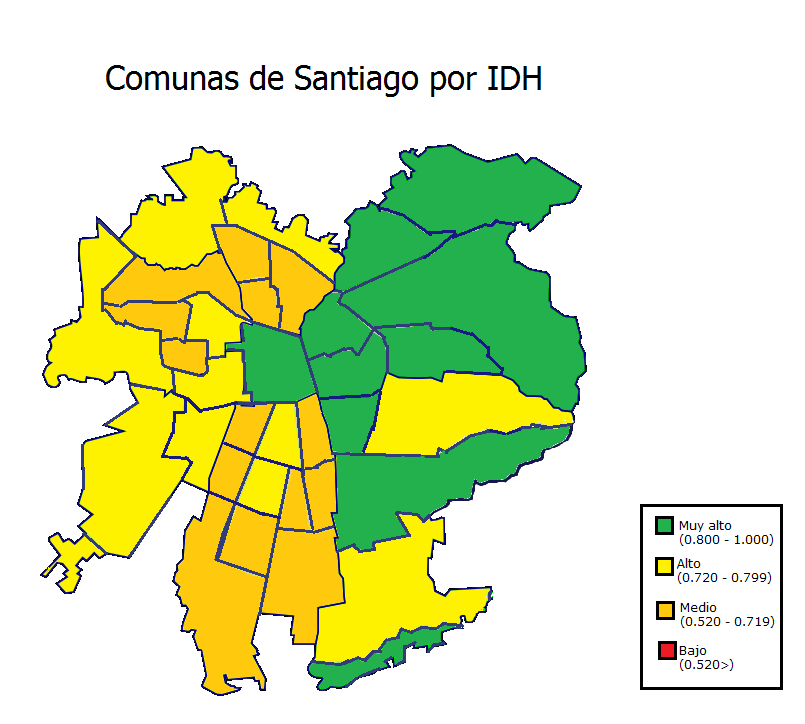
Metropolitan communes by Human Development Index

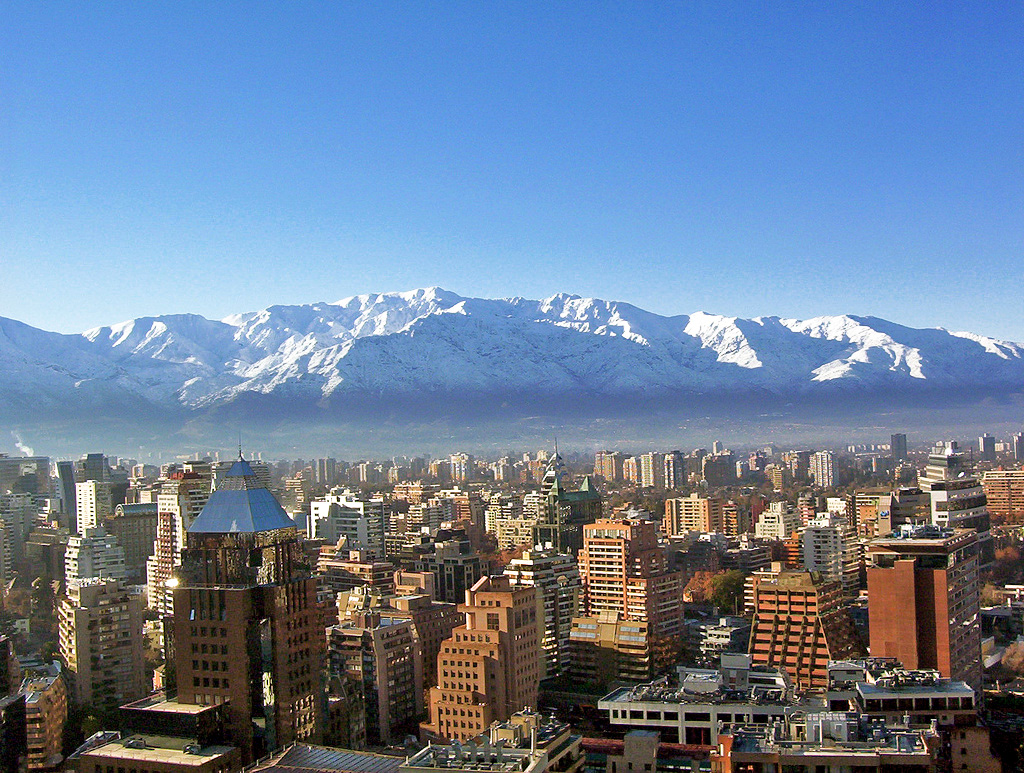
Santiago de Chile

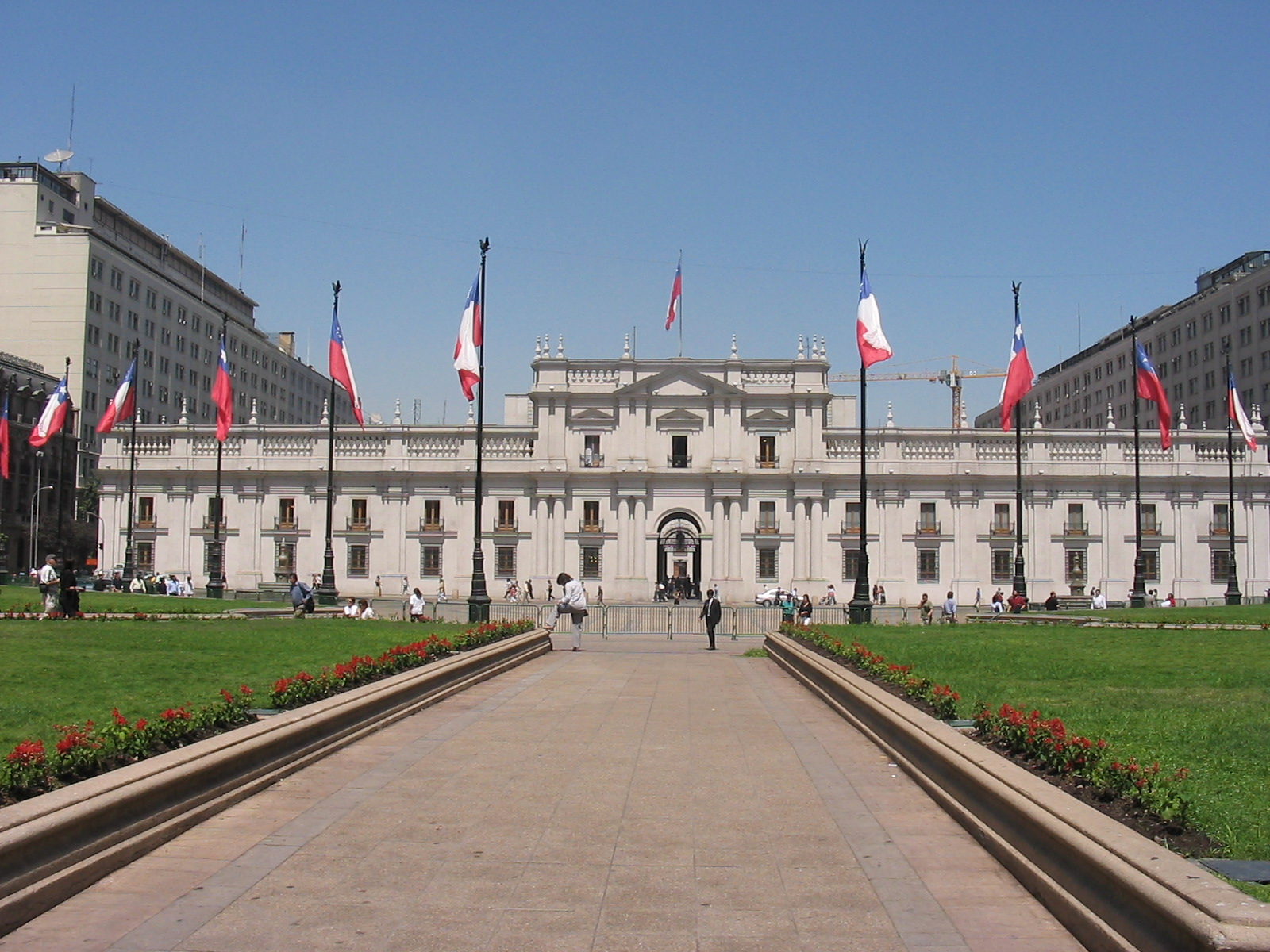
View of Palacio de La Moneda

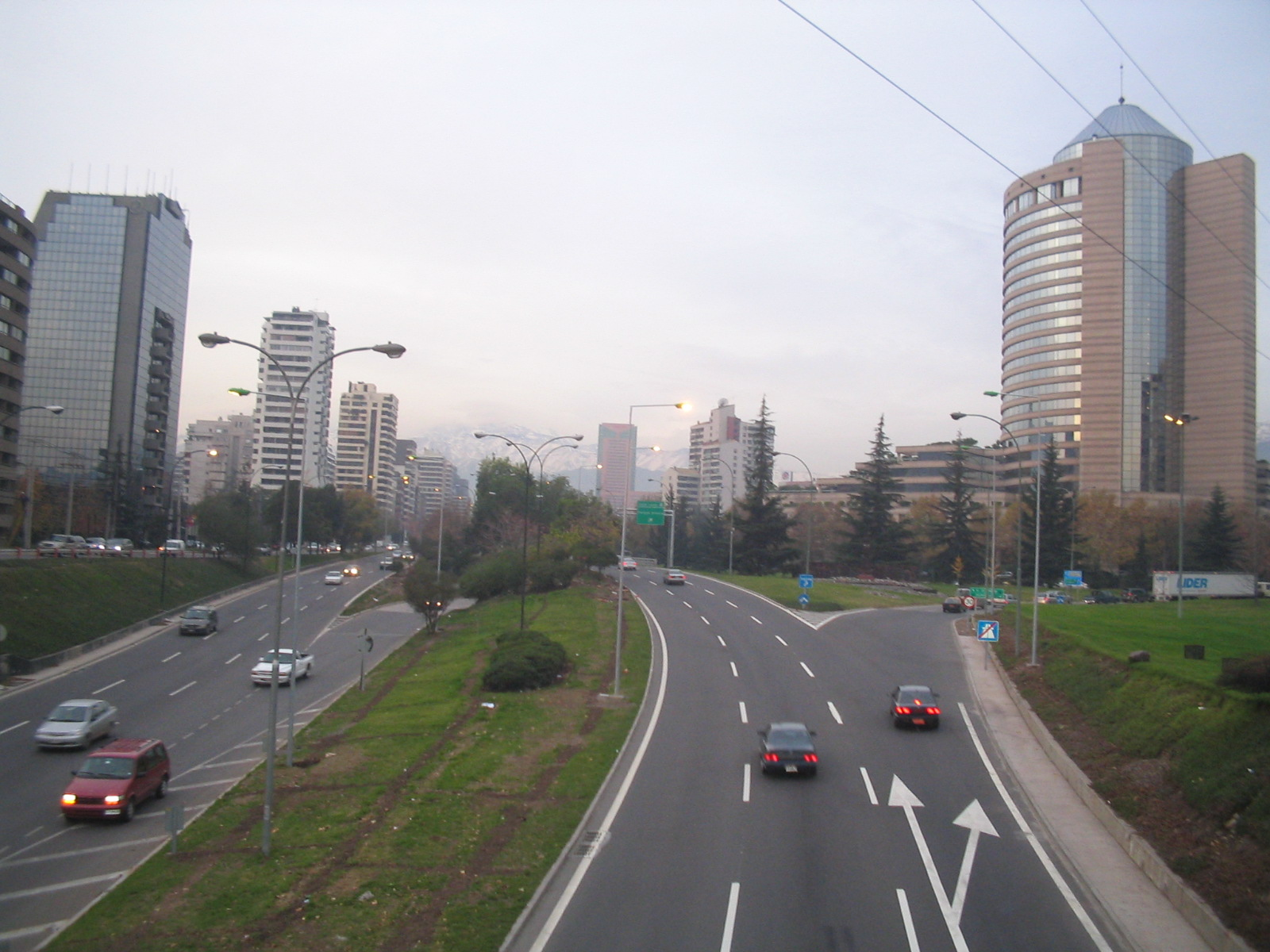
East Santiago

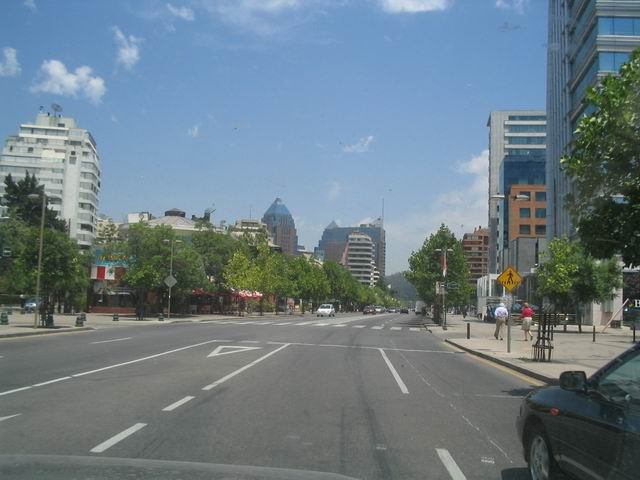
East Santiago

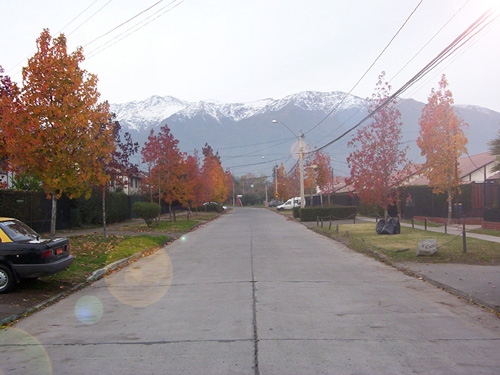
Typical middle-class neighbourhood

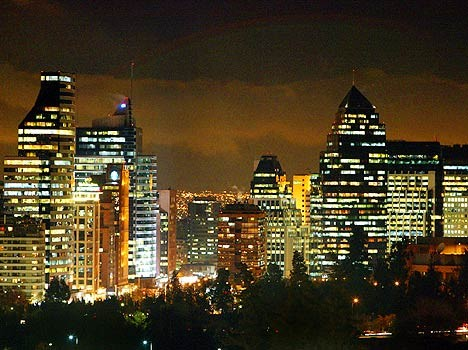
Santiago at night

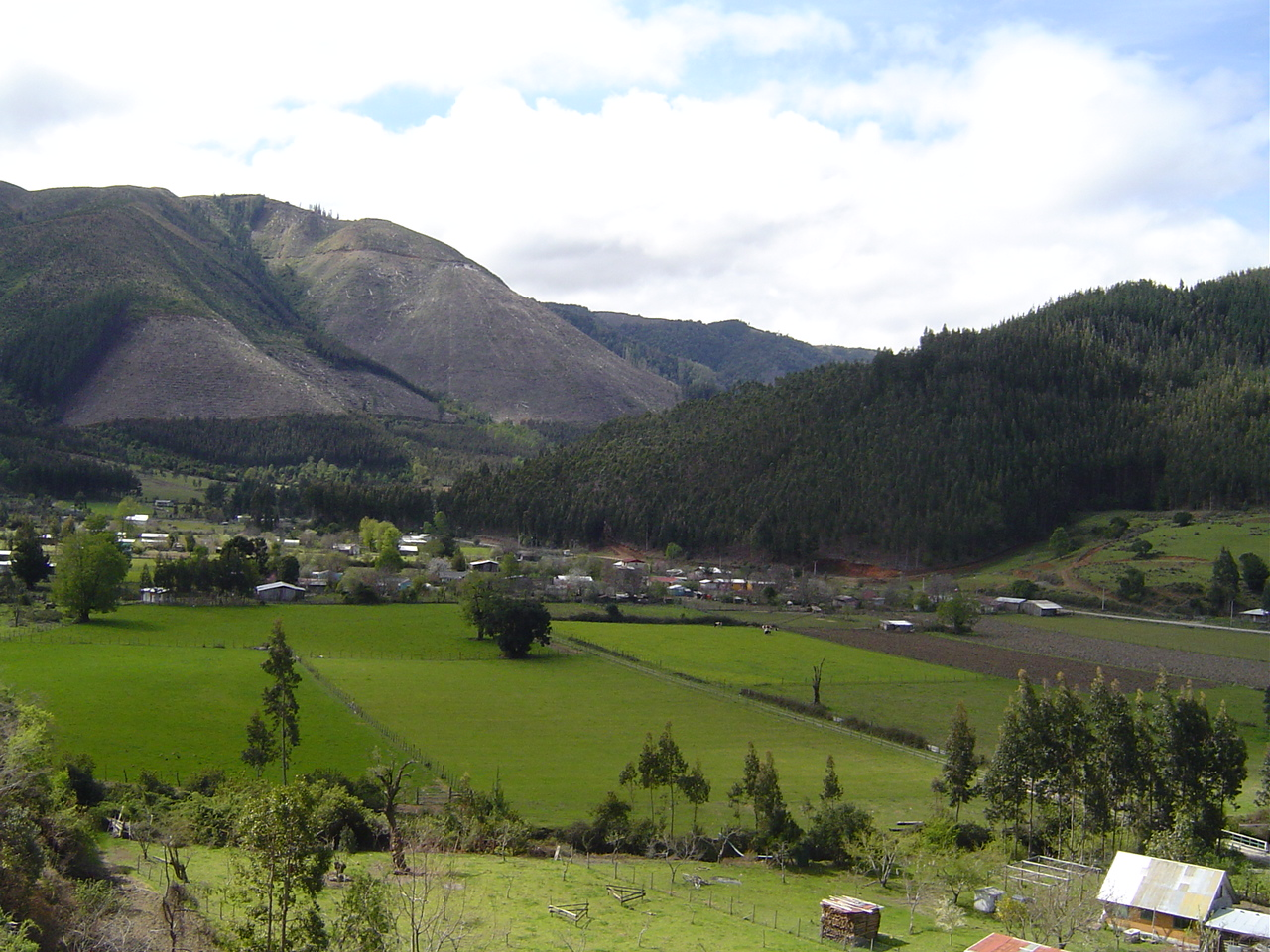
View of the region's rural part

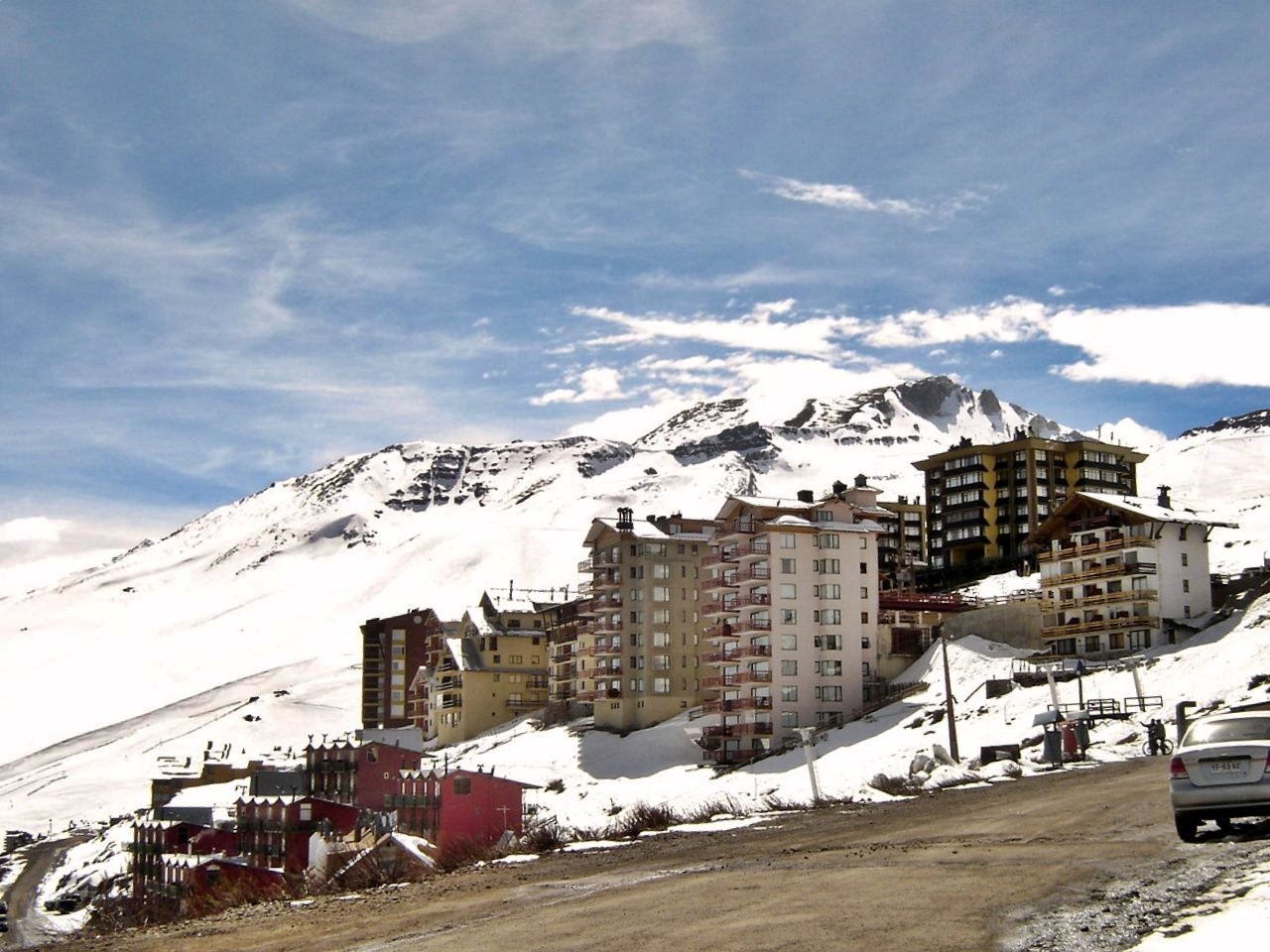
One of the region's ski centres

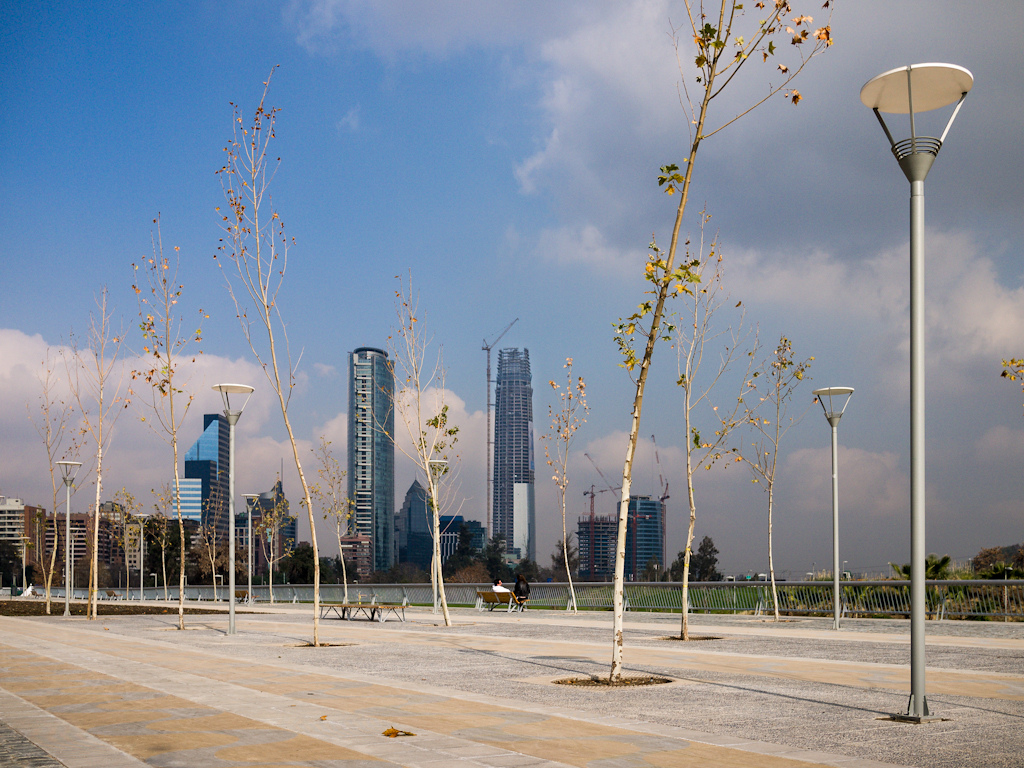

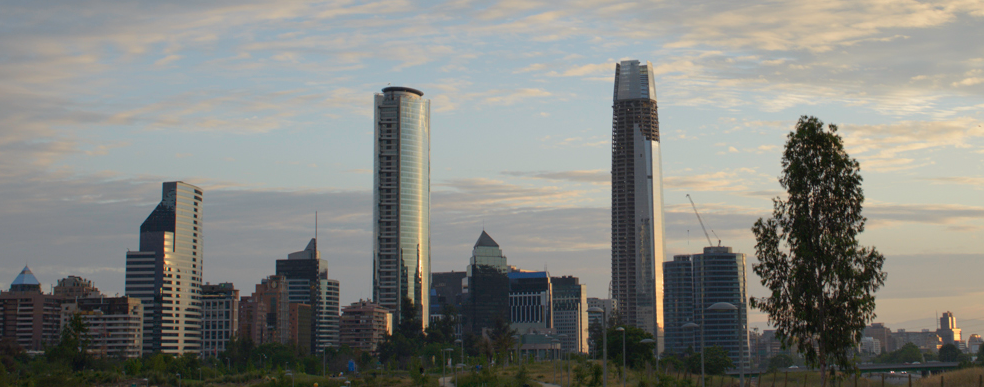

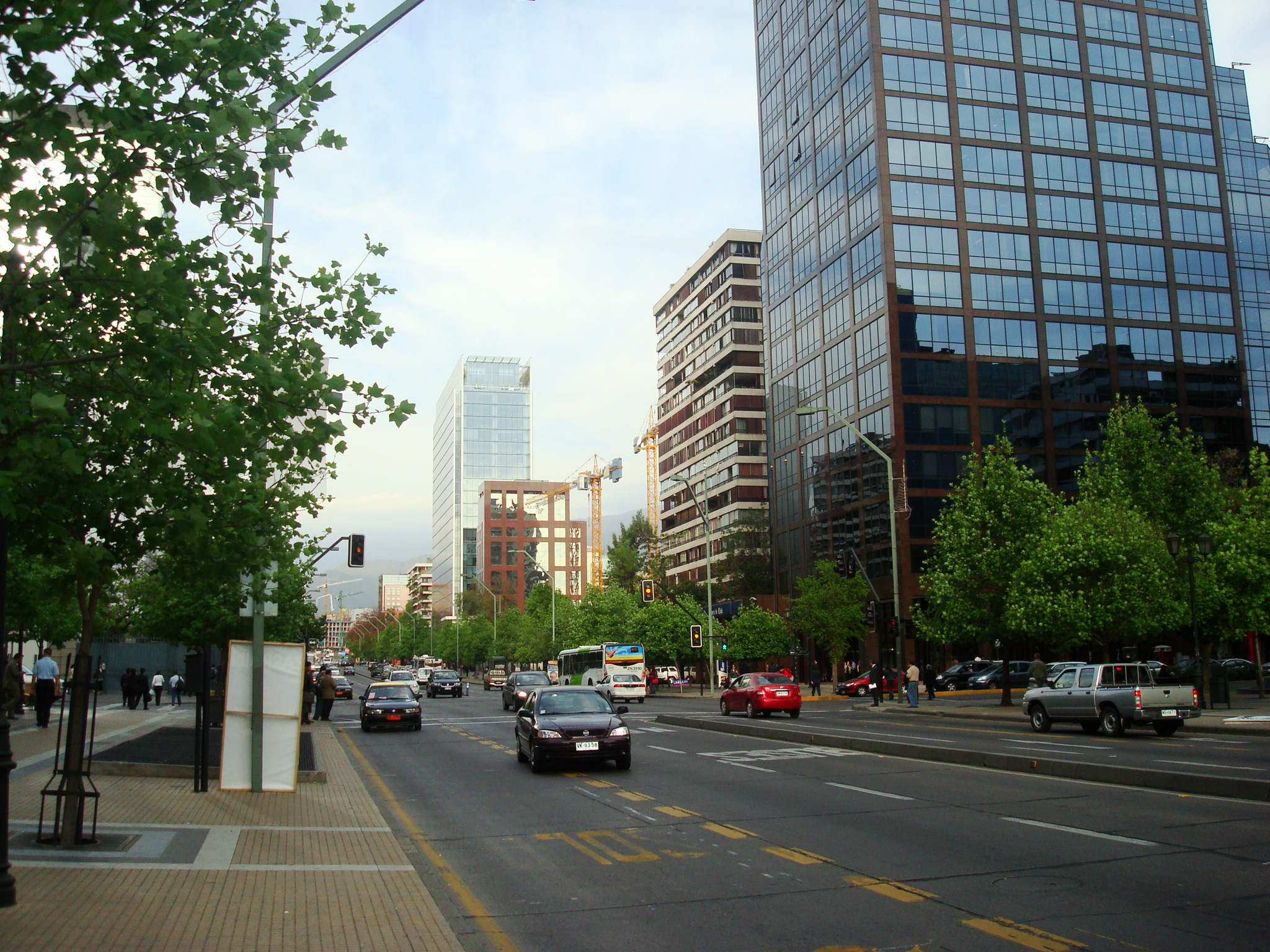

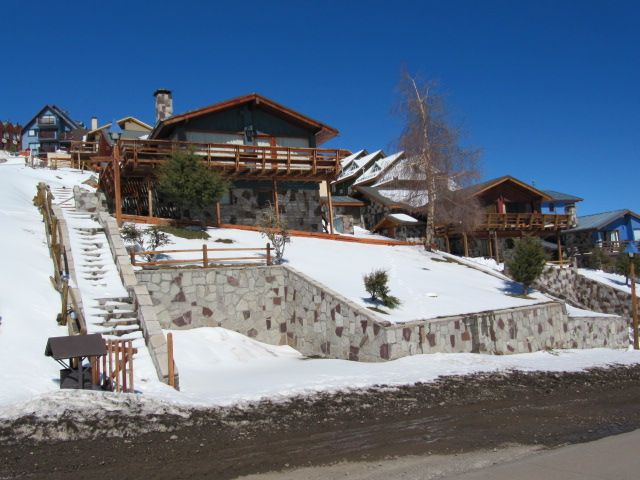

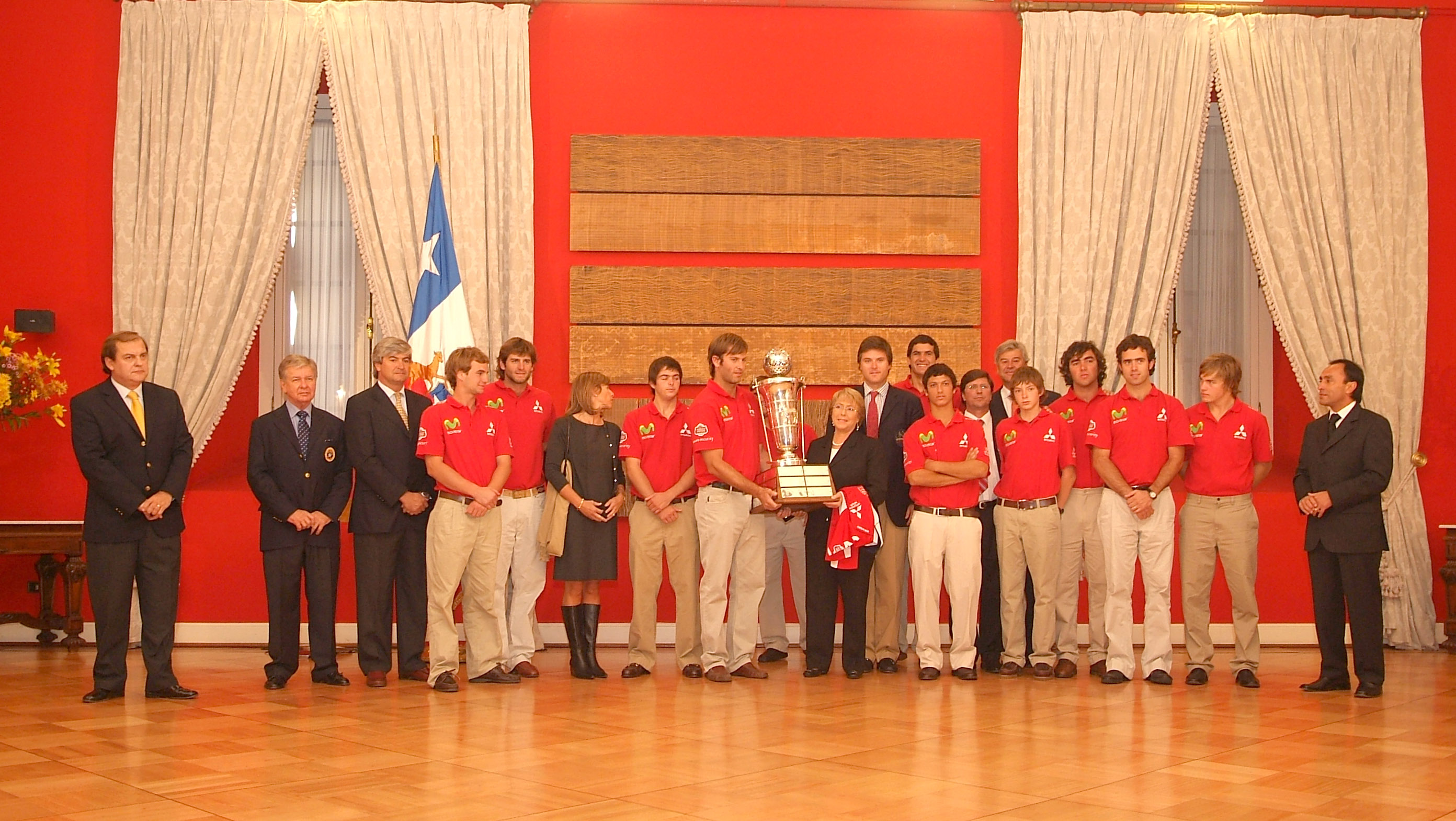
Polo national team with ex-president Michelle Bachelet after winning Polo's World Cup
