= Gonzalo Winter =

Chilean politician (born 1987)

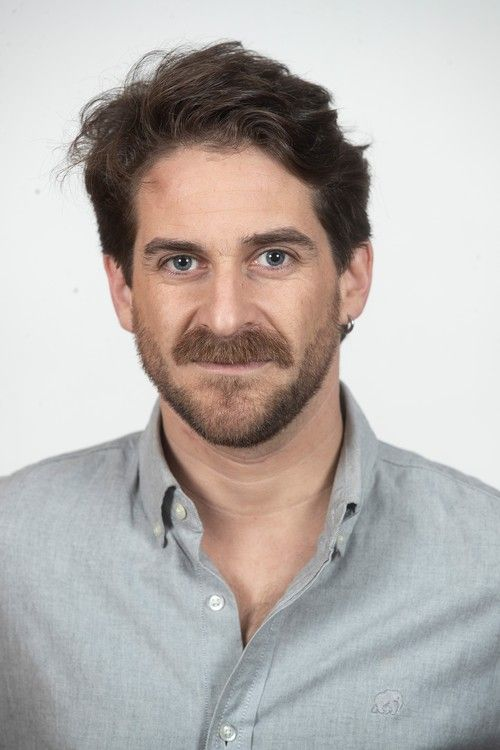
- Official portrait, 2022

Deputy of the Republic
- Incumbent
- Assumed office 11 March 2018
- Constituency: District 10

Personal details
- Born: 6 January 1987 (age 39) Santiago, Chile
- Party: Broad Front (since 2024)
- Other political affiliations: Social Convergence (2019–2024); Autonomist Movement (2016–2019)
- Parent(s): Jaime Winter; María Elena Etcheberry
- Education: University of Chile

Gonzalo Rodolfo Winter Etcheberry (born 6 January 1987) is a Chilean lawyer and politician. Since March 2018, he has been a deputy of the Republic representing District 10, comprising Santiago Metropolitan Region.

== Early life and education ==
Winter was born on 6 January 1987 in Santiago, Chile. He is son of Jaime Winter Garcés and María Elena Etcheberry Court, who was Superintendent of Isapres during the government of President Eduardo Frei Ruiz-Tagle. He is of German descent.

He studied at the Verbo Divino School in Santiago, from which he graduated in 2005. In 2006, he began to study law at the Faculty of that branch of the University of Chile. He was sworn in as a lawyer on 9 October 2020.

== Political career ==
In 2008, he actively participated in the Coordinating Assembly of Secondary Students (ACES). He was part of the foundations of Creando Izquierda, a group that contributed to the triumph of Gabriel Boric in the University of Chile Student Federation presidential contest of 2012.

In 2013, he was director of the Study Center of the Student Federation of the University of Chile, a group in charge of generating knowledge associated with the social movement for education. Later he served as a legislative advisor, during the period 2014 to 2018.

In 2016, he was part of the national leadership of the Autonomist Movement (MA).

In 2017 he was nominated by his community to represent it in the Broad Front (FA) pact, as a candidate for deputy, for the new district No. 10, being elected for the period 2018 to 2022, where he got 5,238 votes and the Broad Front took 34.91% of the votes, together with the deputy Giorgio Jackson and the former Democratic Revolution member, Natalia Castillo.

On 11 March 2018, he became a deputy as an independent. He was integrated into the permanent commissions of Education; Housing and Urban Development and National Assets; Internal Regime and Administration, and participates in the investigative commissions on Financial Operations between Bancard Inversiones Ltda. and companies in tax havens, also on Acts of public organizations in relation to the situation of Universidad del Pacífico where he chaired the commission.
