= Natalia Castillo =

Chilean politician

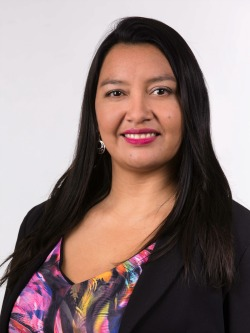

Natalia Castillo is a Chilean politician. A member of the Democratic Revolution, she served in the Chamber of Deputies of Chile.
