= Macul =

- Commune
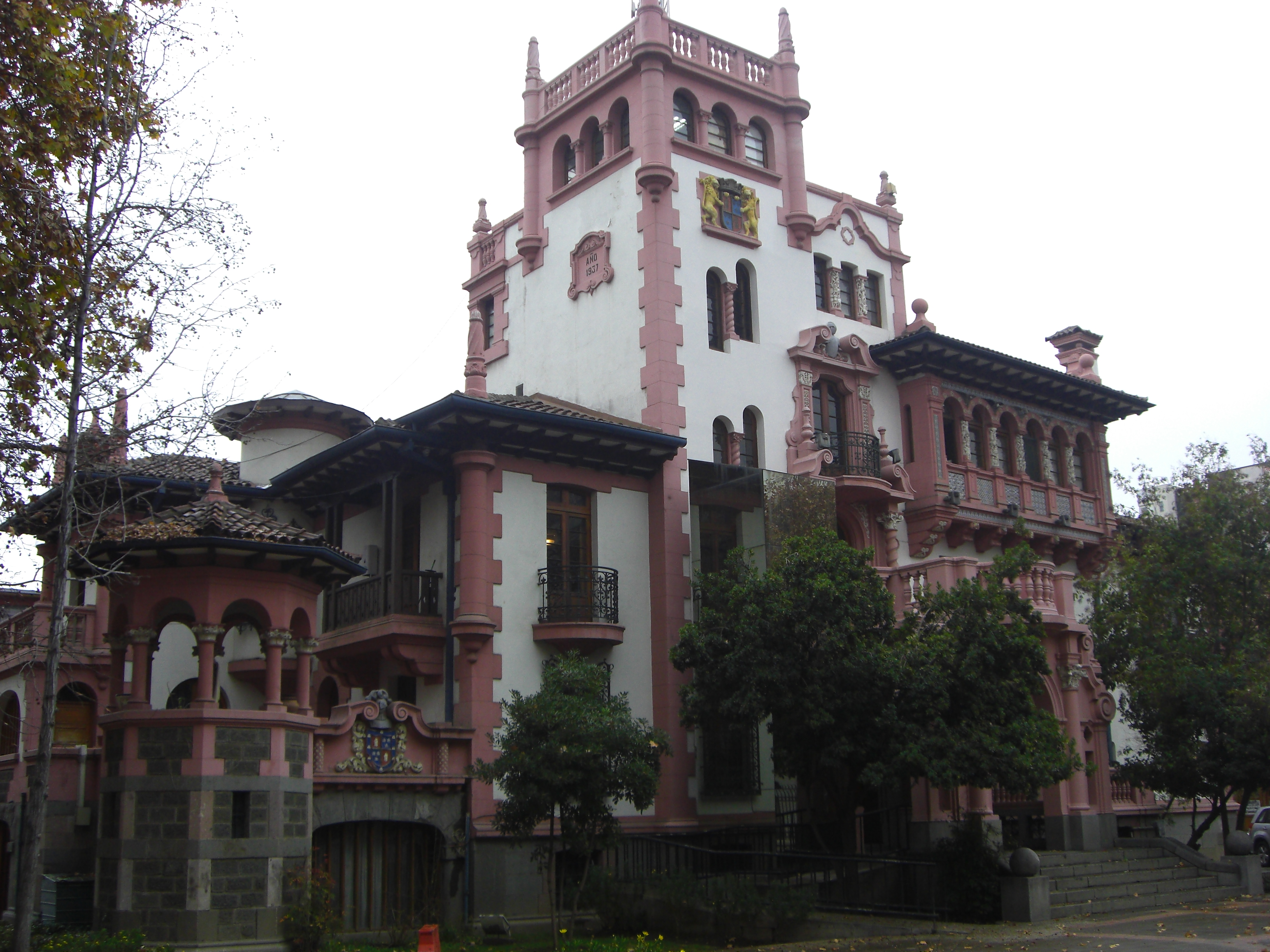
- Vásquez Palace, the town hall for the Municipality of Macul.

- Coat of arms Map of Macul commune in Greater Santiago Location in Chile
- Coordinates (city): 32°39′30″S 70°36′00″W
- Country: Chile
- Region: Santiago Metropolitan
- Province: Santiago

Government
  - Type: Municipality
  - Alcalde: Eduardo Espinoza Gaete (REP)

Area
  - Total: 12.9 km^{2} (5.0 sq mi)

Population (2024)
  - Total: 123,800
  - Density: 9,600/km^{2} (24,900/sq mi)
- Demonym(s): Maculino (m), Maculina (f)
- Time zone: UTC-4 (CLT)
  - Summer (DST): UTC-3 (CLST)
- Area code: 56 +
- Website: Municipality of Macul

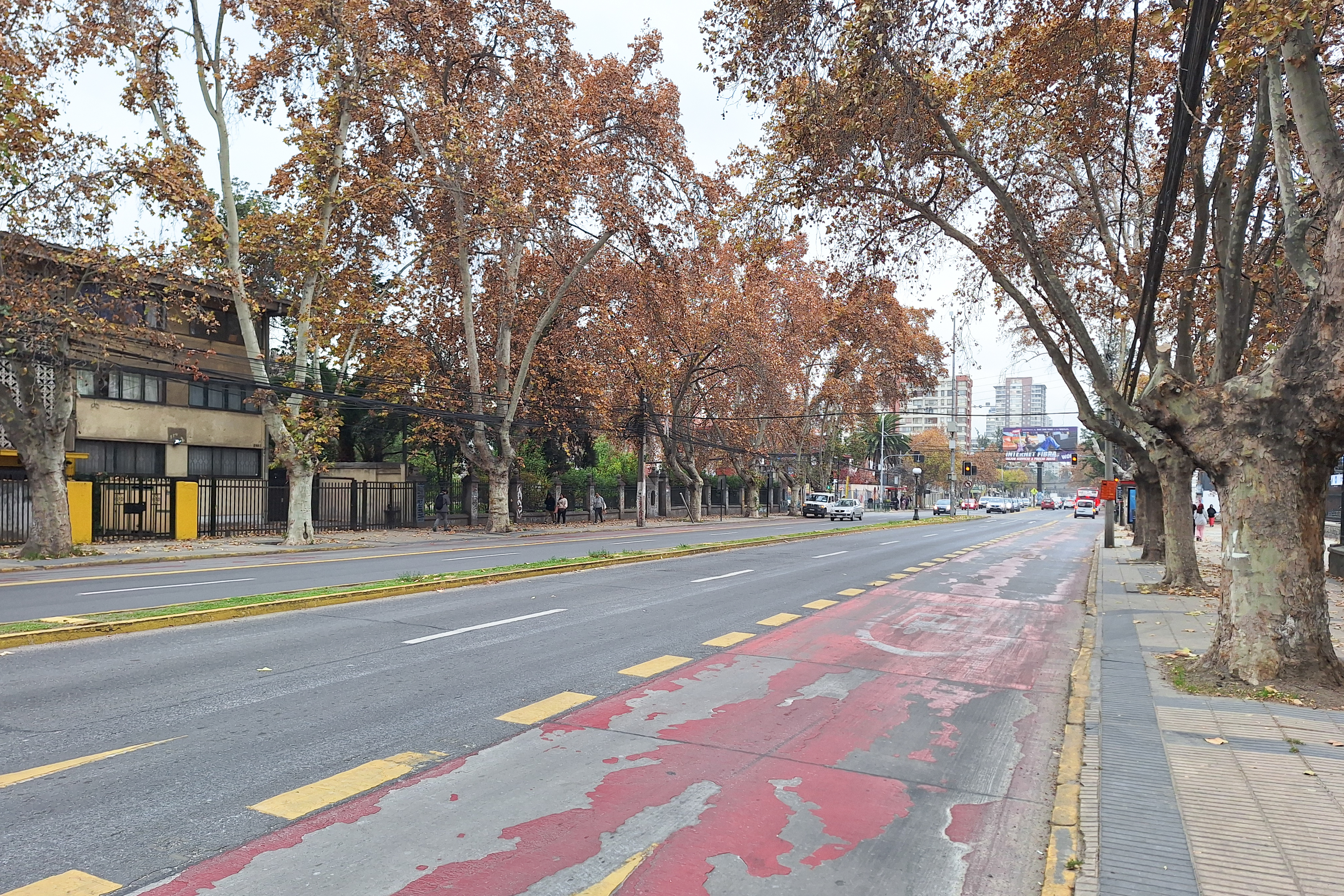
Avenida Macul

Macul (Quechua: "to stretch out right hand") is a commune in the central-eastern part of Greater Santiago, in Santiago Province in the Santiago Metropolitan Region in Chile. It is bordered by the communes of Ñuñoa to the north, San Joaquín to the west, Peñalolén to the east and La Florida to the south. It has 123,800 inhabitants.

It is predominantly a residential and industrial zone, although its activities have diversified in recent times. This has necessitated improvements in infrastructure and connectivity with the rest of Santiago. The commune is considered a middle class area of the city.

== History ==
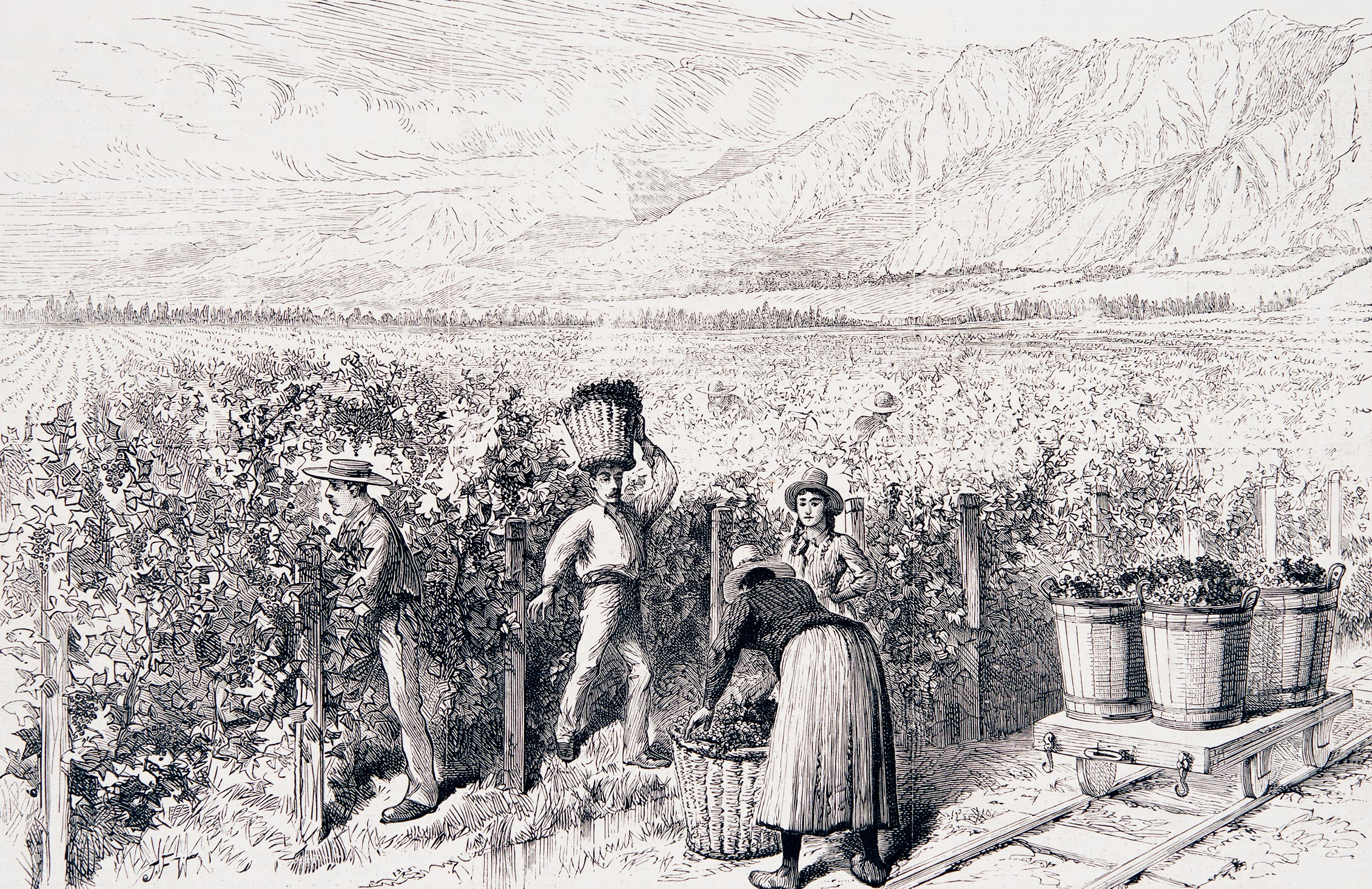
The vineyards of Macul (1890).

Macul was one of five indigenous villages located in the region of Ñuñohue prior to the arrival of the Spaniards. Its economy was heavily based on agriculture due to the fertile soil in the area.

By the seventeenth century, the Ñuñoa area kept its agricultural character, however the development of a road system that had strengthened its ties with the city of Santiago began. During the nineteenth century there were a number of changes and developments that modified the purely rural character of Ñuñoa and Macul, some of the more prevalent changes were the construction of railways, housing developments and the enactment of the Autonomous Commune Law.

Since 1930, Ñuñoa has been strengthening its residential character, and due to its very accessible infrastructure for transportation and communications with the rest of the city, it has now developed as a largely industrialized settlement, with a good number of factories making their home in Ñuñoa.

Beginning in 1960, the territory of Macul ceased to be an urban expansion area to the city of Santiago, reaching critical mass and the maximum for developing land as an urban area, reaching its 100% developed status. This proclamation ended in the early 1970s with the opening of the Américo Vespucio Ringroad, allowing for further development.

In 1981, Ñuñoa was subdivided into three communes: Ñuñoa, Peñalolén and Macul. It was not until 1984 that Macul officially became a municipality. The municipality is now allowed to exercise its authority over the fully urbanized territory of all three communes. Macul had a significant industrial sector before combining with the commune of Ñuñoa.

Since 1992, the municipal authorities are elected every four years via popular vote.

== Administration ==
As a commune, Macul is a third-level administrative division of Chile administered by a municipal council, headed by an alcalde who is elected by popular vote every four years. The 2024-2028 alcalde is Eduardo Espinoza Gaete (REP). The communal council had the following members:

- María Olga Gómez Araya (REP)
- Tito Sergio Puyol Carreño (Ind/REP)
- Cristián Aguiló Armstrong (RN)
- Ximena Zuleta Dinamarca (DC)
- Margarita Figueroa Huenutripai (PC)
- Michael Urra Depaulo (FA)
- Jaime López Larraín (FRVS)
- Soledad Pérez Peña (PAVP)

The commune is divided into twenty neighbourhood units, which are divided into assemblies and include participation from neighbours in the same area or district.

Within the electoral divisions of Chile, Macul is represented in the Chamber of Deputies by Felipe Salaberry (UDI) and Ximena Vidal (PPD) as part of the 25th electoral district, (together with San Joaquín and La Granja). The commune is represented in the Senate by Soledad Alvear (PDC) and Pablo Longueira (UDI) as part of the 8th senatorial constituency (Santiago-East).

== Demographics ==
Historical population
Year	Pop.	±% p.a.
1970	73,111	—
1982	113,100	+3.70%
1992	120,708	+0.65%
2002	112,535	−0.70%
2017	116,534	+0.23%
2024	123,800	+0.87%
Source: INE, Memoria Chilena

As of the 2024 census, the population is 123,800, of which 47.2% are males, and 52.8% are females. People aged under 15 years old make up 14.5% of the population, and people aged 65 years old and over make up 16.1%. 100% of the population is urban.

- Average annual household income: US$49,004 (PPP, 2006)
- Population below poverty line: 13.4% (2006)
- Regional quality of life index: 80.30, high, 12 out of 52 (2005)
- Human Development Index: 0.806, 10 out of 341 (2003)

=== Ethnic minorities ===
As of the 2024 census, Indigenous peoples make up 6.8% of the population, and Afro-Chileans make up 1.0%.

=== Religion ===
As of the 2024 census, 66.2% of the population over 15 years old are Christians (52.7% Catholics, 10.0% Evangelicals or Protestants, and 3.6% other branches), 0.1% are Jews, 0.1% are Muslims, 0.2% are Buddhists, 0.1% are Hinduists, 0.8% are adrehents of other religions, and 32.4% are irreligious.

=== Immigration ===
As of the 2024 census, immigrants make up 14.1% of the population – 13.2% are from South America, 0.6% from North America, 0.2% from Europe, 0.1% from Asia, 0.02% from Africa, and & 0.01% from Oceania.

The Columban Missionaries operate a Migrant Centre in Macul.

== Sights ==
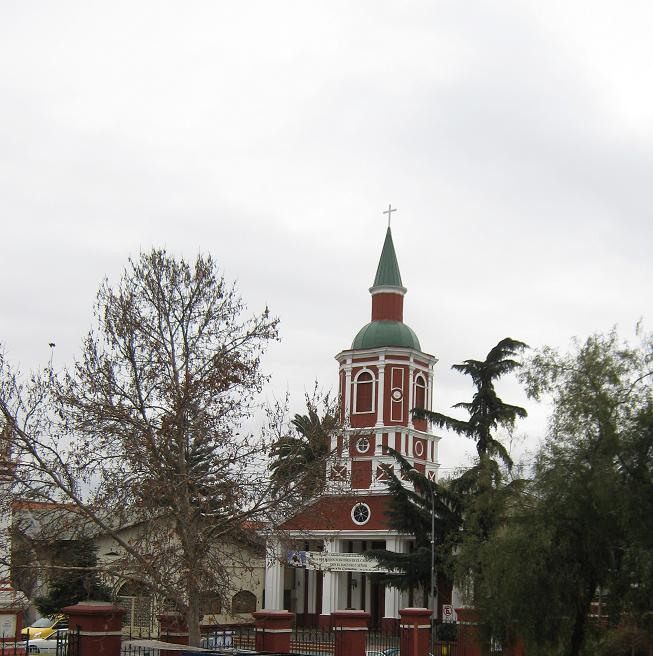
The Sagrada Familia church

The Vasquez Palace, also known as "The Macul Castle", is a beautiful palace located in the center of the community. Apart from being a popular tourist attraction, the palace also serves as the municipality's main office.

== Education ==
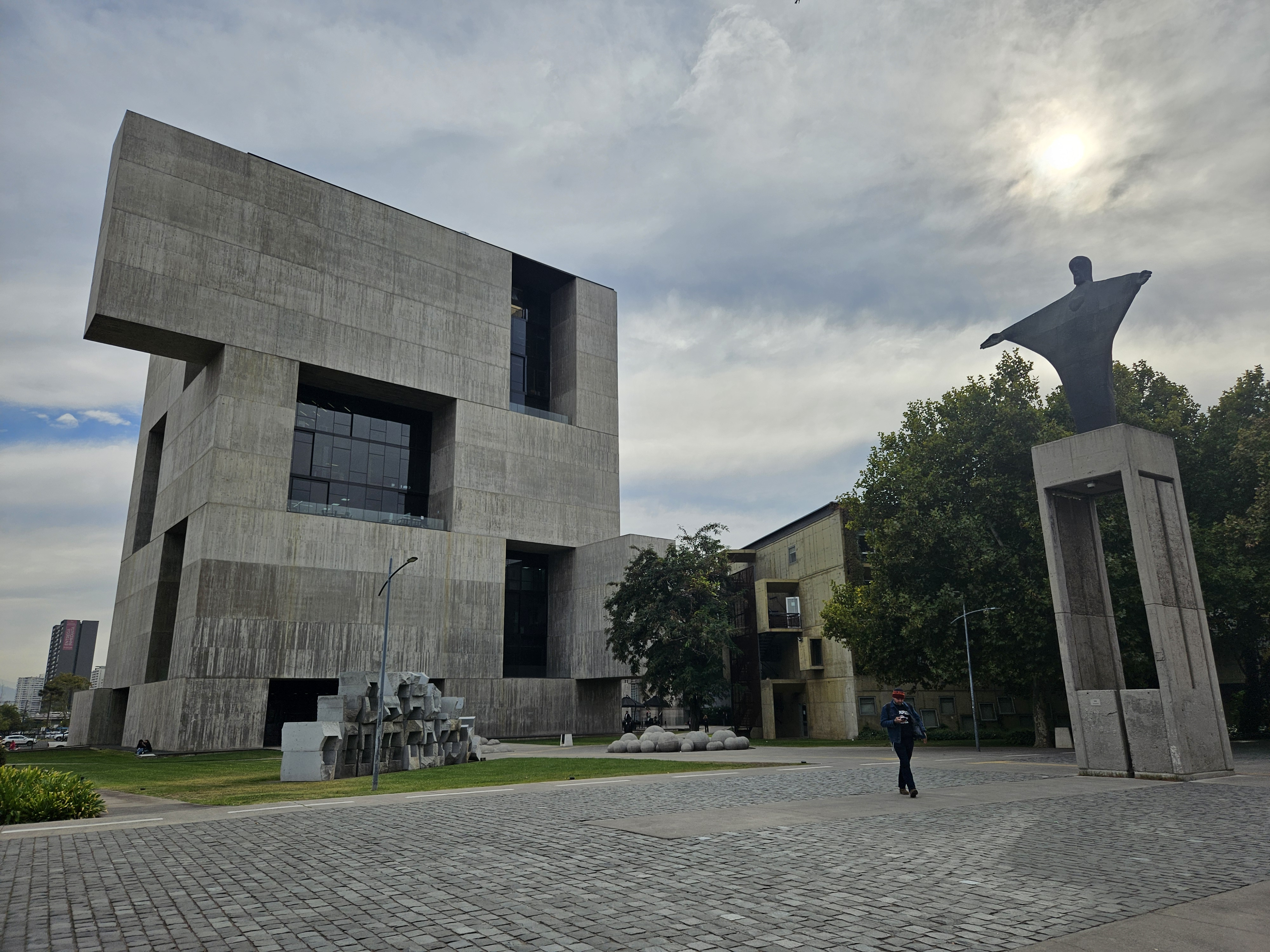
San Joaquín Campus of Universidad Católica de Chile.

The community of Macul is home to the San Joaquín Campus of the Pontifical Catholic University of Chile, which is located on the eastern side of Vicuña Mackenna Avenue and serviced by the San Joaquín metro station. The campus hosts several world-class faculties and features modern laboratories, libraries and sport fields. Three buildings on campus were designed by architect Alejandro Aravena, the 2016 laureate of the Pritzker Architecture Prize.

Macul is also home to the athletic campus of the University of the Americas called Campus One (Sports Complex UDLA). This campus is the result of the union of ONE, a company of Hans Gildemeister, and Universidad de Las Americas, to promote physical activity within the University community.

Another higher education institution with a campus in Macul is INACAP, which replaced the former campus on the corner of Colón and Tabancura Streets. The campus in Macul is the largest campus in Chile built by INACAP, with more than 20,000 m^{2} (4.9 acres) of floor space on 30,000 m^{2} (7.4 acres) of land. The INACAP campus is located at the intersection of Vicuña Mackenna Avenue and Escuela Agricola Street.

== Sport ==
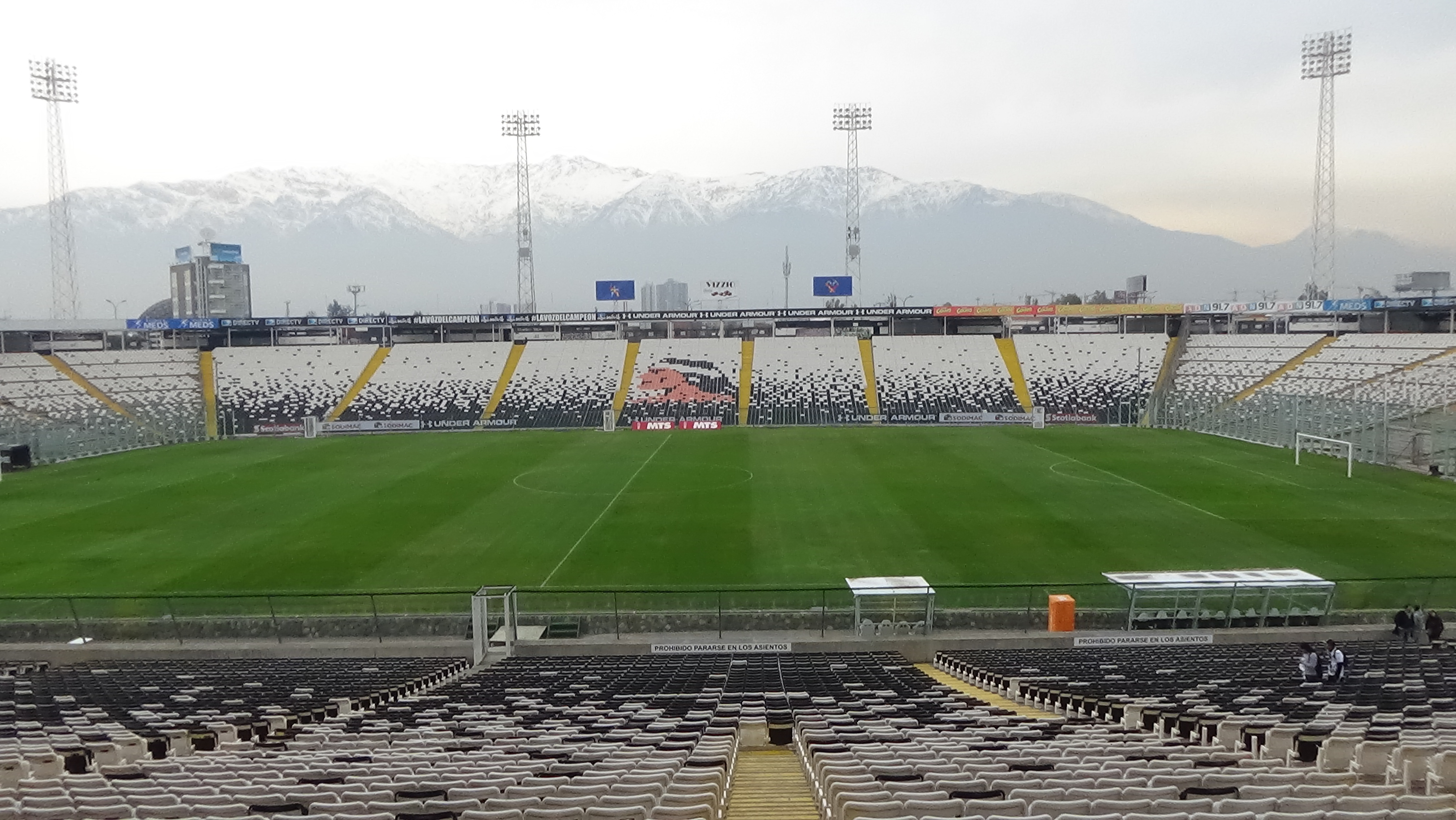
Estadio Monumental David Arellano, Colo-Colo arena

The commune houses the Aquatic Club Macul, the Estadio Monumental David Arellano owned by the most popular Chilean football team, Colo-Colo, and the training center of the Chilean football team Juan Pinto Durán.
