= La Granja, Chile =

La Granja
- Commune
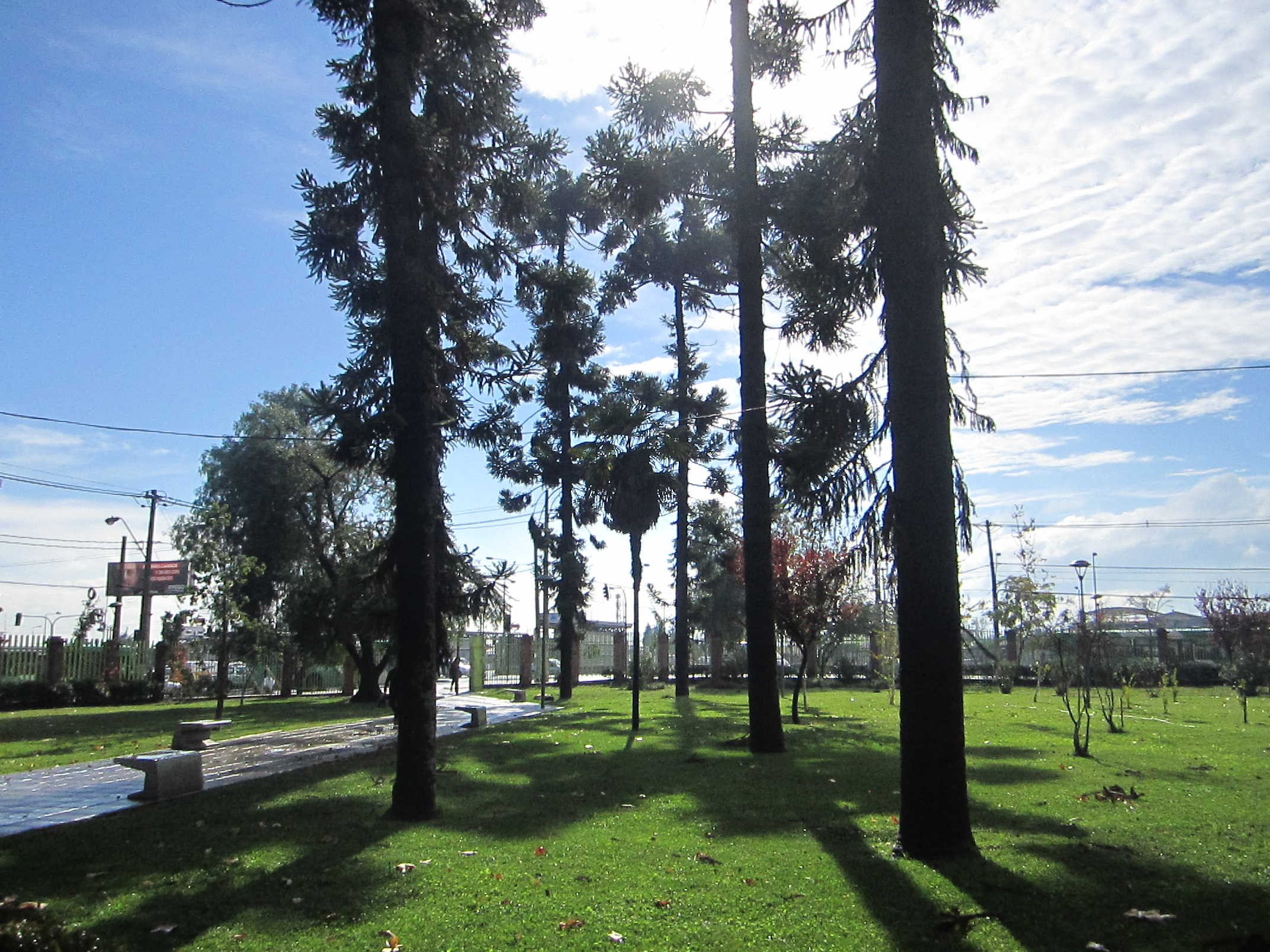
- Civic Plaza of La Granja

- Coat of arms Location of La Granja within Greater Santiago Location in Chile
- Coordinates (city): 33°32′S 70°37.5′W
- Country: Chile
- Region: Santiago Metropolitan Region
- Province: Santiago

Government
  - Type: Municipality
  - Alcalde: Claudio Arriagada (Ind.)

Area
  - Total: 10.1 km^{2} (3.9 sq mi)

Population (2024)
  - Total: 112,022
  - Density: 11,100/km^{2} (28,700/sq mi)
  - Urban: 112,022
  - Rural: 0
- Time zone: UTC-4 (CLT)
  - Summer (DST): UTC-3 (CLST)
- Area code: 56 +
- Website: Municipality of La Granja

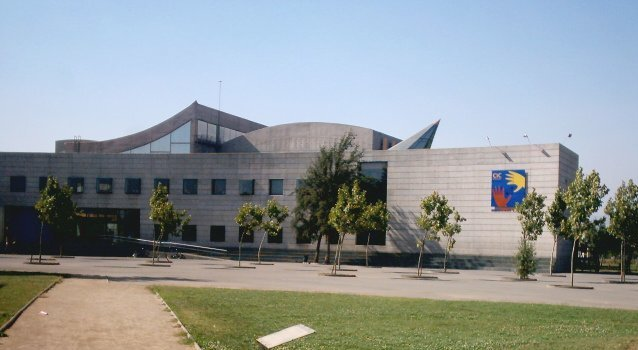
Museo Interactivo Mirador in 2006

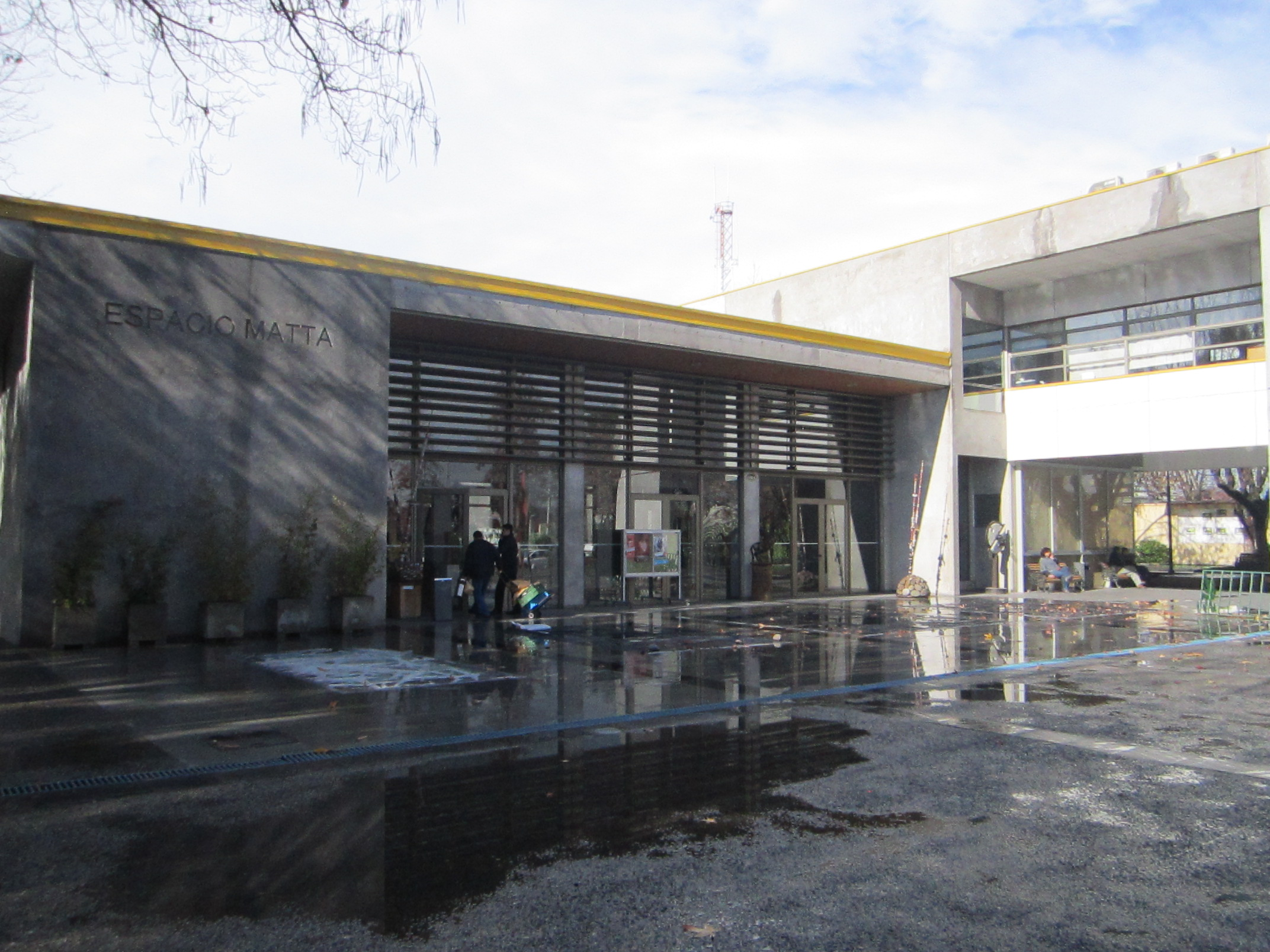
Espacio Cultural Matta

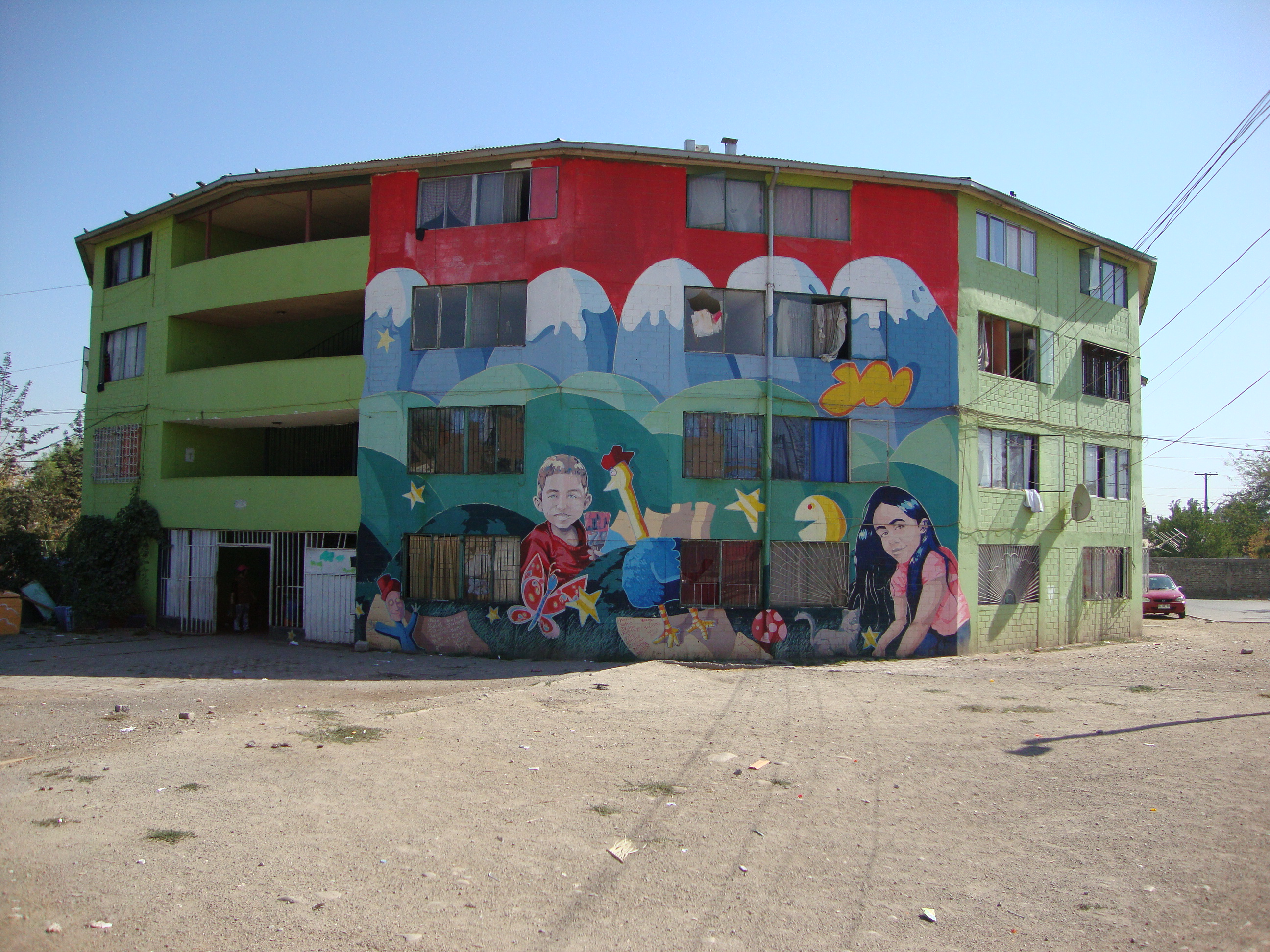
Marcela Casanueva Housing Complex

La Granja (Spanish for "the farm") is a commune in the Santiago Province of the Santiago Metropolitan Region in Chile. It has 112,022 inhabitants.

== Administration ==
As a commune, La Granja is a third-level administrative division of Chile administered by a municipal council, headed by an alcalde who is directly elected every four years. The 2024-2028 alcalde is Claudio Arriagada (Ind). The communal council has the following members:

- María de la Jara Frias (RN)
- Tamara Osorio Peralta (REP)
- Nancy Nicul Loncoleo (PAVP)
- Juan Valdés Valdés (PS)
- Bernardita Aguirre Cabezas (PS)
- Sergio Urbina Núñez (DC)
- Ximena Palacios Orellana (FA)
- Andrés Moreno Barrios (PL)

Within the electoral divisions of Chile, La Granja is represented in the Chamber of Deputies by Felipe Salaberry (UDI) and Ximena Vidal (PPD) as part of the 25th electoral district, (together with Macul and San Joaquín). The commune is represented in the Senate by Soledad Alvear (PDC) and Pablo Longueira (UDI) as part of the 8th senatorial constituency (Santiago-East).

== Demographics ==
As of the 2024 census, the population is 112,022, of which 48.9% are males, and 51.1% are females. People under 15 years old make up 17.0% of the population, and people over 65 years old make up 16.3%. 100% of the population is urban.

Historical population
Year	Pop.	±% p.a.
1970	77,263	—
1982	109,168	+2.92%
1992	133,285	+2.02%
2002	132,520	−0.06%
2017	116,571	−0.85%
2024	112,022	−0.57%
Source: INE, Memoria Chilena

- Average annual household income: US$24,662 (PPP, 2006)
- Population below poverty line: 14.2% (2006)
- Regional quality of life index: 77.93, mid-high, 18 out of 52 (2005)
- Human Development Index: 0.689, 158 out of 341 (2003)

=== Ethnic minorities ===
As of the 2024 census, Indigenous peoples make up 10.1% of the population, and Afro-Chileans make up 1.0%.

=== Religion ===
As of the 2024 census, 68.7% of the population over 15 years old are Christians (47.7% Catholics, 17.8% Evangelicals or Protestants, and 3.3% other branches), 0.1% are Jews, 0.05% are Muslims, 0.1% are Buddhists, 0.01% are Hinduists, 0.6% are adrehents of other religions, and 30.4% are irreligious.

=== Immigration ===
As of the 2024 census, immigrants make up 8.5% of the population - 7.5% are from South America, 0.9% from North America, 0.1% from Europe, 0.1% from Asia, 0.01% from Africa, and 0.004% from Oceania.
