= San Joaquín =

- City and Commune
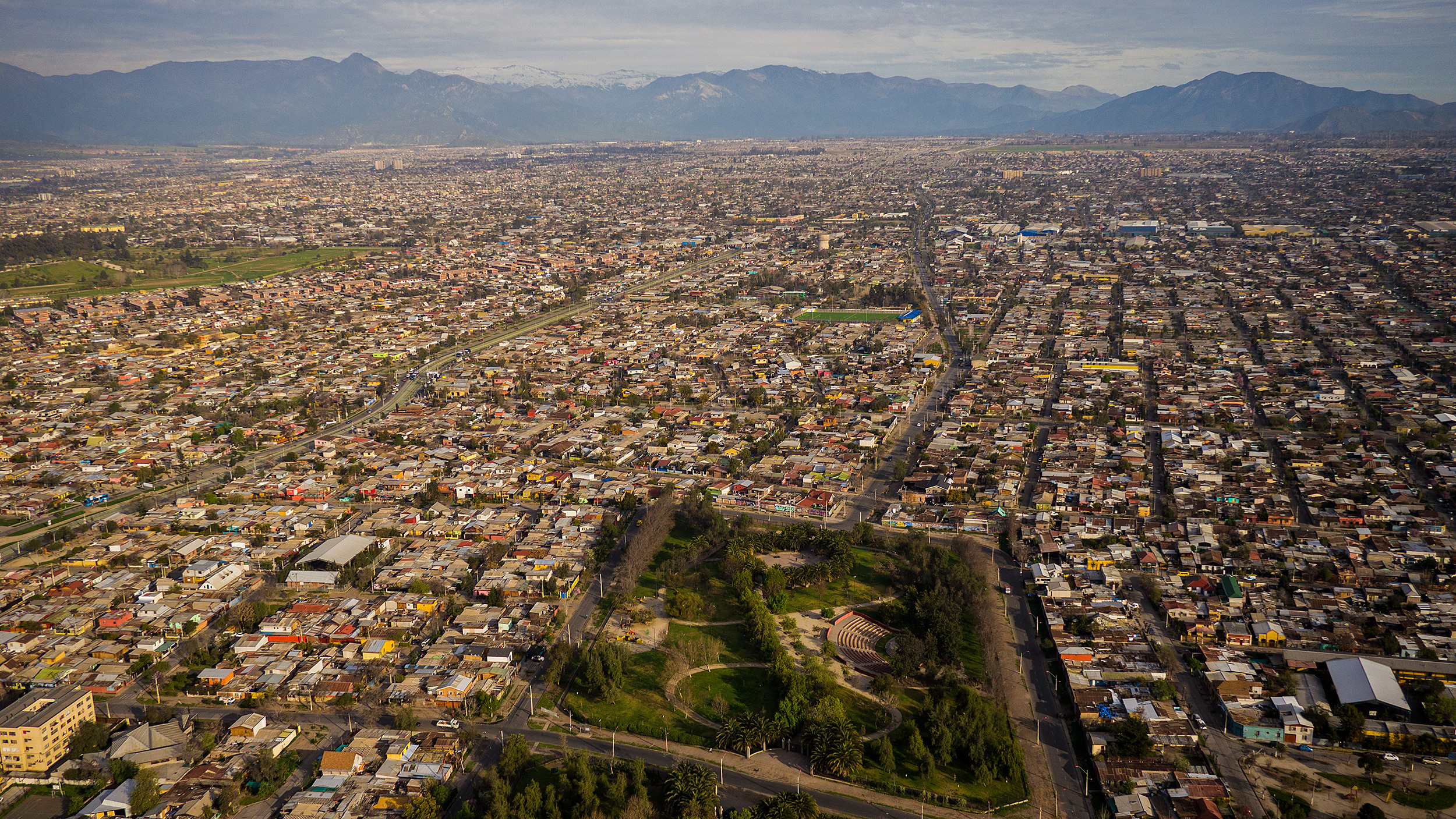
- Panoramic view of southern San Joaquín

- Coat of arms Map of the San Joaquín commune within Greater Santiago Location in Chile
- Coordinates (alcalde's office): 33°28′44.96″S 70°38′28.67″W
- Country: Chile
- Region: Santiago Metro.
- Province: Santiago
- Founded: 1981

Government
  - Type: Municipality
  - Alcalde: Sergio Echeverría García

Area
  - Total: 9.7 km^{2} (3.7 sq mi)

Population (2002 Census)
  - Total: 97,625
  - Density: 10,000/km^{2} (26,000/sq mi)
  - Urban: 97,625
  - Rural: 0

Sex
  - Men: 46,708
  - Women: 50,917
- Time zone: UTC-4 (CLT)
  - Summer (DST): UTC-3 (CLST)
- Area code: 56 +
- Website: Municipality of San Joaquín

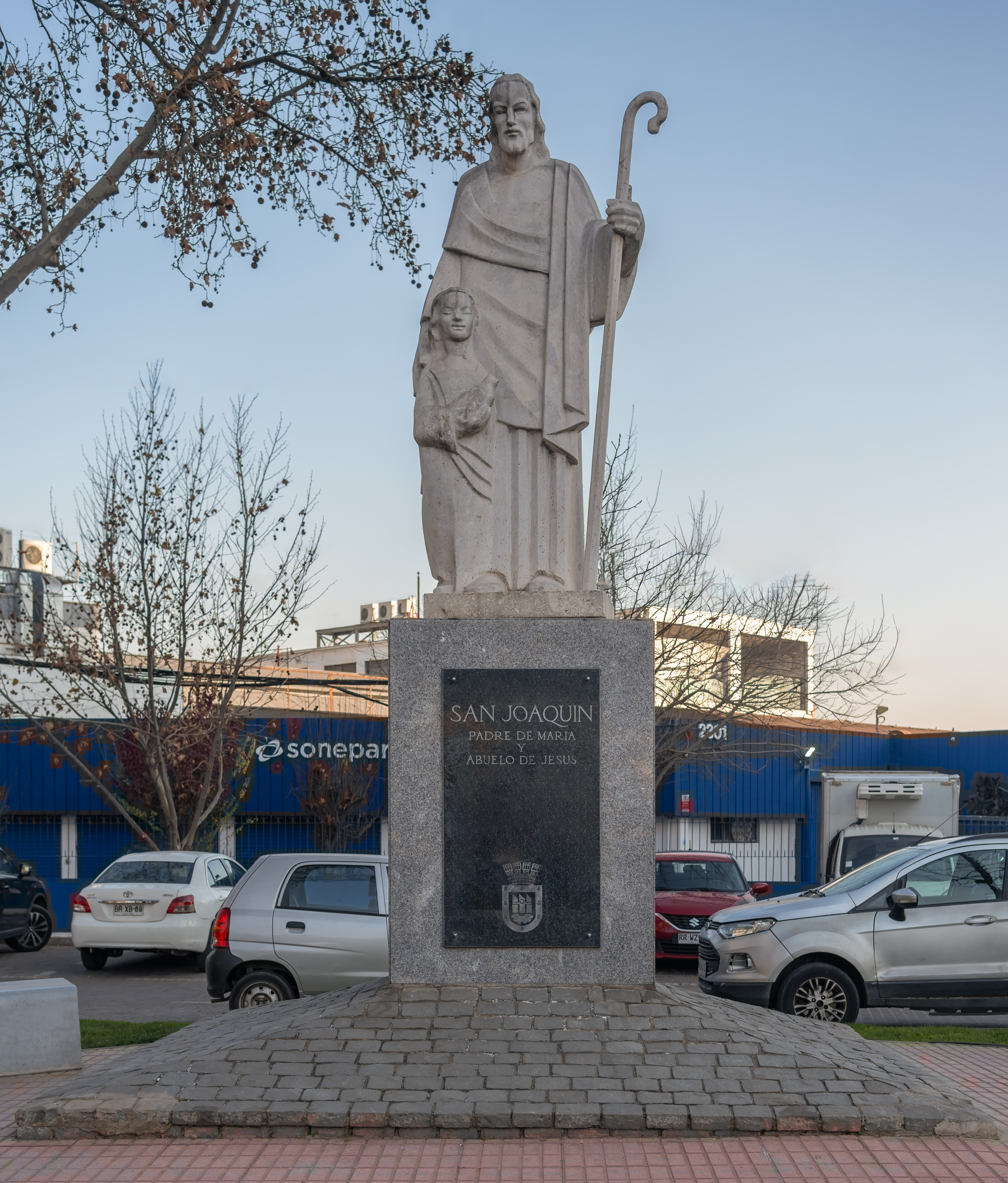
San Joaquín statue

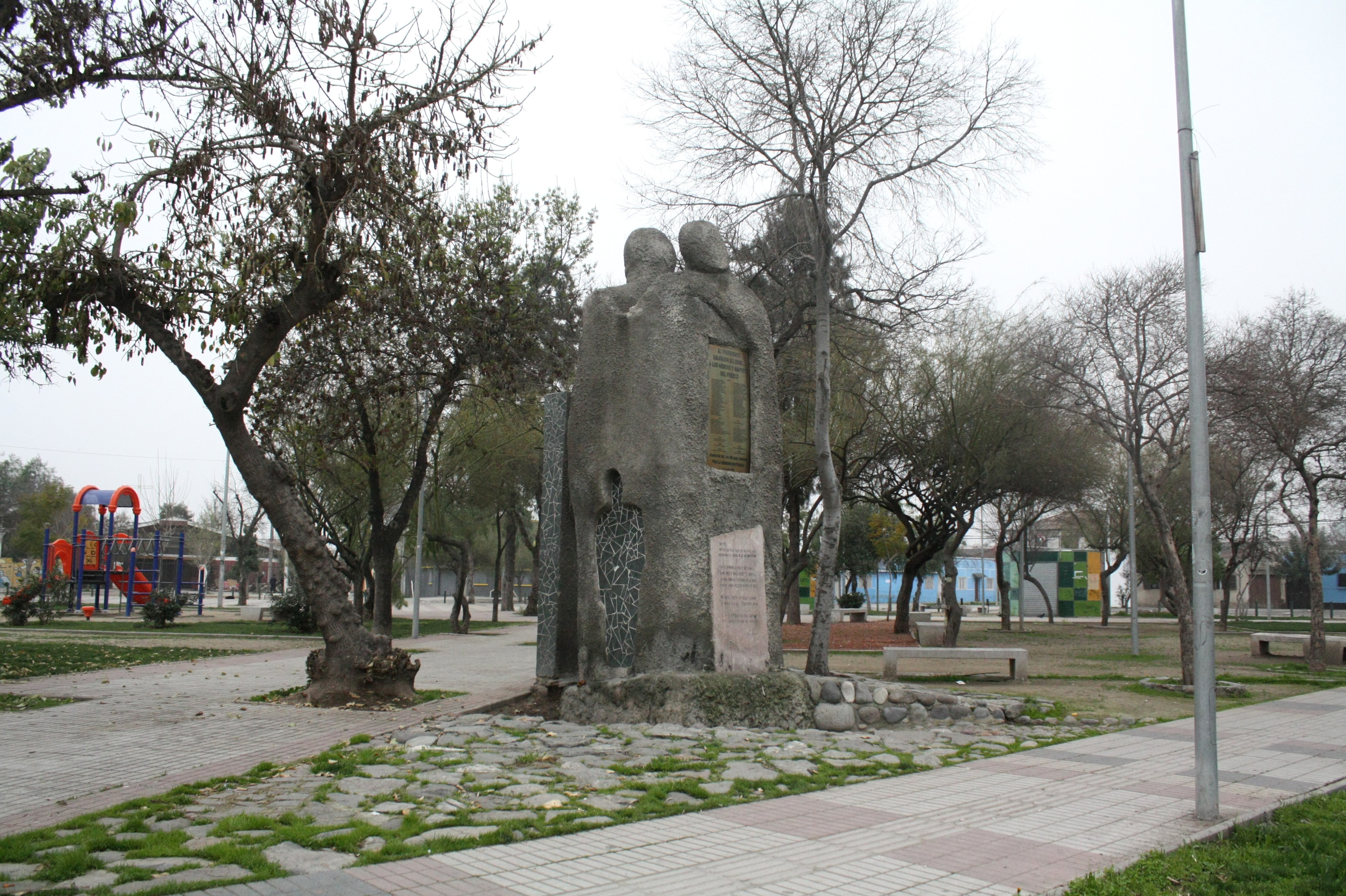
La Legua Memorial

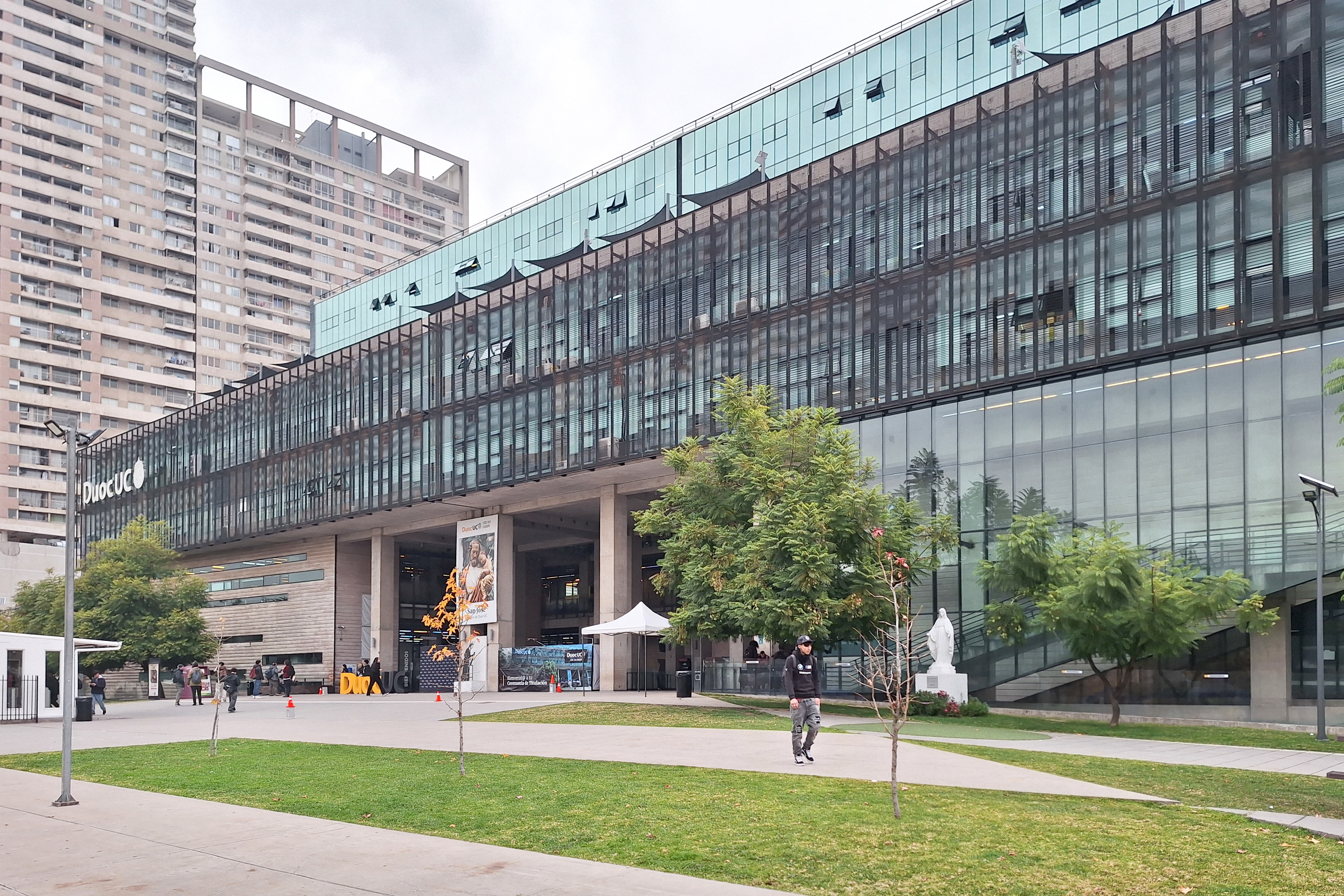
Duoc UC

San Joaquín (Spanish for Saint Joachim) is a commune of Chile located in Santiago Province, Santiago Metropolitan Region. It is part of Greater Santiago.

== Demographics ==
According to the 2002 census of the National Statistics Institute, San Joaquín spans an area of 9.7 km^{2} (4 sq mi) and has 97,625 inhabitants (46,708 men and 50,917 women), and the commune is an entirely urban area. The population fell by 14.4% (16,392 persons) between the 1992 and 2002 censuses. Its 2006 projected population was 87,035.

=== Statistics ===
- Average annual household income: US$19,089 (PPP, 2006)
- Population below poverty line: 7.4% (2006)
- Regional quality of life index: 76.84, mid-high, 20 out of 52 (2005)
- Human Development Index: 0.719, 92 out of 341 (2003)

== Administration ==
As a commune, San Joaquín is a third-level administrative division of Chile administered by a municipal council, headed by an alcalde who is directly elected every four years. The 2012-2016 alcalde is Sergio Echeverría García. The communal council has the following members:

- Nelly Santander Marín (IND)
- Ramón Ortiz Seguel (PPD)
- Víctor Contreras Vicencio (IND)
- Gustavo Arias Campos (PC)
- Elizabeth Galleguillos Medina (RN)
- Cristóbal Labra Bassa (PS)
- Manuel León Huerta (PDC)
- José Contreras Silva (UDI)

Within the electoral divisions of Chile, San Joaquín is represented in the Chamber of Deputies by Felipe Salaberry (UDI) and Ximena Vidal (PPD) as part of the 25th electoral district, (together with Macul and La Granja). The commune is represented in the Senate by Soledad Alvear (PDC) and Pablo Longueira (UDI) as part of the 8th senatorial constituency (Santiago-East).

== Notable people ==
- Arturo Vidal, footballer
- Fabián Orellana, footballer
