= Allende (disambiguation) =

Salvador Allende (1908–1973) was the president of Chile from 1970 until 1973.

Allende may also refer to:

== People with the surname ==
- Allende (surname)
  - Ignacio Allende (1769–1811), Mexican caudillo during the Mexican War of Independence
  - Isabel Allende (1942–), Chilean author

== Places in Mexico ==
- Allende Municipality (disambiguation)
- Allende Municipality, Chihuahua
- Allende, Coahuila
- Allende Municipality, Coahuila
- Allende, Guanajuato
- Allende, Nuevo León

== Other uses ==
- Allende (meteorite), a meteorite fall of 1969 in Chihuahua, Mexico
- Allende (spider), a genus of spiders
- Allende family, a Chilean family of Spanish descent
- Allende metro station, in Mexico City, Mexico
- Instituto Allende, an art college in San Miguel de Allende, Mexico
- Allender, a surname
