= Alessandri (surname) =

Alessandri is an Italian surname. Notable people with the surname include:

- Alessandro Alessandri (1461–1523), Italian jurist
- Ana Fani Alessandri Carlos, Brazilian geographer
- Angelo Alessandri (born 1969), Italian politician
- Arturo Alessandri (1868–1950), Chilean President
- Felice Alessandri (1747–1798), Italian composer
- Fernando Alessandri (1897–1982), Chilean politician
- Fiona Alessandri (born 1967), Australian swimmer.
- Gaspare Alessandri (1908–1997), Italian boxer
- Giovanni Mario Alessandri (16th century), Italian Hispanist and grammarian
- Gustavo Alessandri Valdés (1929–2017), Chilean politician and lawyer
- Hernan Alessandri (1900–1982), Chilean physician
- Innocente Alessandri (18th century), Italian engraver
- Jorge Alessandri (1896–1986), Chilean President
- Lodovico Alessandri (1903–1987), Brazilian fencer
- Madeleine Alessandri CMG (born 1965), British civil servant
- Marcel Alessandri (1895–1968), French army officer
- Nerio Alessandri (born 1961), Italian entrepreneur

== See also ==
- Alessandri (disambiguation)
- Alessandri family
- Palazzo degli Alessandri, Florence
- Palazzo degli Alessandri, Viterbo
