= Ramón Allende Padín =

Chilean physician and politician

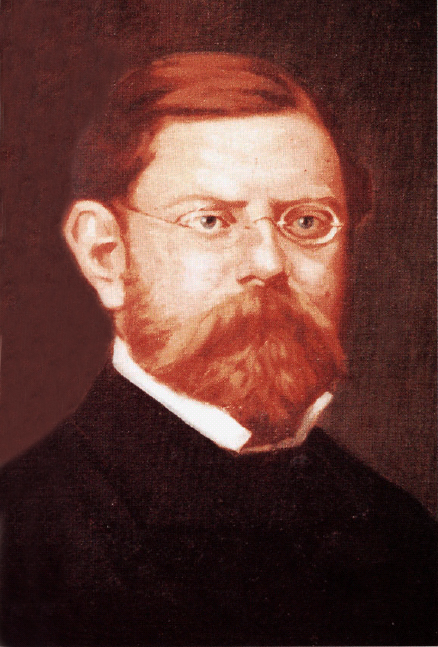
- Allende in 1884

Alternative Senator for Atacama
- In office 1882 – 14 October 1884

Deputy of the Republic of Chile for Copiapó and Caldera
- In office 1879–1882

Member of the Conservative Commission of the National Congress of Chile
- In office 1878–1879
- In office 1877–1878

Deputy of the Republic of Chile for Santiago
- In office 1876–1879

Personal details
- Born: 19 March 1845 Valparaíso, Chile
- Died: 14 October 1884 (aged 39) Santiago, Chile
- Party: Partido Radical
- Spouse: Eugenia Castro del Fierro
- Children: 3, including Salvador Allende Castro
- Relatives: Allende family; Salvador Allende Gossens (grandson); Laura Allende (granddaughter); Beatriz Allende (great-granddaughter); Isabel Allende (great-granddaughter); Andrés Pascal Allende (great-grandson); Maya Fernández (great-great-granddaughter)
- Education: Universidad de Chile
- Occupation: Physician; politician
- Medical career
- Profession: Physician; surgeon
- Field: Obstetrics; battlefield medicine
- Institutions: Hospital de Sanidad de Valparaíso; Hospital Clínico San Borja Arriarán; Hospital San Vicente de Paul; Escuela Blas cuevas Ramón allende

Ramón Allende Padín (19 March 1845 – 14 October 1884), nicknamed El Rojo ("The Red"), was a Chilean medical doctor and political figure. The writer of several important scientific publications, he also headed the Chilean Army's medical services during the War of the Pacific. Allende was of Basque descent.

== Biography ==
The son of José Gregorio Allende Garcés and Salomé Padín Ruiz, Allende was born in Valparaíso. He studied at the Liceo de Valparaíso and the Instituto Nacional before graduating, on 20 June 1865, from the Universidad de Chile as a physician specializing in obstetrics and surgery. He was an assistant professor of the School of Medicine, becoming a full professor in November 1865.

In 1870 he became the Chief Doctor of Valparaíso's emergency public hospital, the Hospital de Sanidad. He also worked with Professor Wenceslao Díaz and at the San Borja and San Vicente de Paul hospitals. In 1875 President Federico Errázuriz Zañartu appointed him to the Public Welfare Committee, charged with a reforming brief. Allende joined the Radical Party and was in 1876 elected as deputy for Santiago. He was reelected in 1879, this time for Copiapó and Caldera. He also served from 8 December 1879 to 1 November 1880 as chairman of the Council on Public Hygiene.

On 28 September 1880, during the War of the Pacific (1879–1884), Dr Allende was appointed Superintendent of the Army Medical Services. During this time he attended the troops as chief medical officer in charge of the Ambulance Service (an "ambulance" at the time was a mobile hospital of about 20 beds, equipped for the performance of emergency field surgery). As such he is considered to be the founder of the Chilean Army Medical Corps.

Allende headed the "Justice and Liberty" Masonic Lodge and was a notorious enemy of the Catholic Church, which excommunicated him. He was also editor of the newspapers Guía para el Pueblo ("The People's guide") and El Deber ('"Duty'"). He was nominated as a member of the Public Instruction Committee and in this role he founded several schools, among them the Blas Cuevas School in Valparaíso, the first masonically controlled school. He was also a director of the Corps of Firemen.

Allende was elected to the Senate in 1882, and in 1884 he became Masonic Grand Master, but died a few months later, aged 39, from complications of diabetes. Allende's funeral – at which the public eulogy was delivered by the radical leader Enrique Mac-Iver and two future presidents of Chile, José Manuel Balmaceda and Ramón Barros Luco, carried the coffin – turned into a gigantic political meeting.

== Personal life ==
On 24 April 1869 Allende married Eugenia Castro del Fierro, with whom he had three sons: Ramón, Tomás and Salvador. From his third and youngest son he was the grandfather of President Salvador Allende.

== See also ==
- History of Chile
