= Hortensia Bussi =

Chilean educator, activist and First Lady (1914–2009)

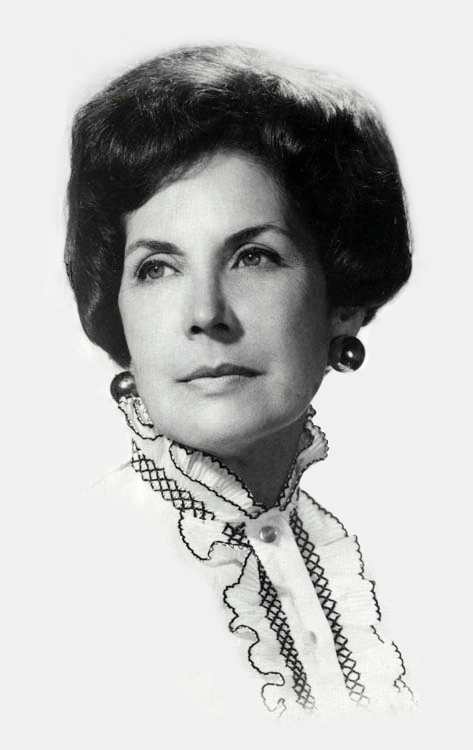
- Bussi in 1970

First Lady of Chile
- In role 3 November 1970 – 11 September 1973
- President: Salvador Allende
- Preceded by: María Ruiz-Tagle Jiménez
- Succeeded by: Lucía Hiriart

Personal details
- Born: Mercedes Hortensia Bussi Soto; 22 July 1914 Valparaíso, Chile
- Died: 18 June 2009 (aged 94) Santiago, Chile
- Resting place: Santiago General Cemetery
- Spouse: Salvador Allende (m. 1940; died 1973)
- Children: 3, including: Beatriz Allende; Isabel Allende
- Relatives: Maya Fernández (granddaughter); Laura Allende (sister-in-law); Denise Pascal (niece); Andrés Pascal Allende (nephew)
- Education: University of Chile
- Occupation: Educator; librarian; professor; activist
- Awards: Lenin Peace Prize

Mercedes Hortensia "Tencha" Bussi Soto (22 July 1914 – 18 June 2009), also known by her married name Hortensia Bussi de Allende, was a Chilean educator, librarian, activist and First Lady between 1970 and 1973. Following the 1973 coup d'état, Bussi lived in exile in Mexico.

== Early life and family ==
Mercedes Hortensia Bussi Soto was born 22 July 1914 in Valparaíso (Note: Also cited as Rancagua.) to Ciro Bussi Aguilera, a merchant marine, and Mercedes Soto García (died 1917). One of three siblings, Bussi grew up on an upper-class family.

Moving to Santiago, Bussi enrolled at the Pedagogical Institute at the University of Chile and later graduated as a history and geography teacher. Initially working as a teacher, Bussi later worked as a librarian at the National Statistics Institute.

On the day of the 1939 Chillán earthquake, Bussi meet her future husband Salvador Allende, a physician, politician and future President of Chile, on the La Alameda. Bussi married Allende on 17 March 1940 and had three children, including Beatriz Allende and Isabel Allende.

=== Health ===
Soon after Allende's failed presidential bid in the 1952 presidential election, Bussi developed pulmonary tuberculosis. In February 1953, the Allende Bussi family moved from there home in Santa Lucía Hill, to the Casa de Guardia Vieja 392. Bussi was able to buy the home using a loan from the National Statistics Institute.

== Exile ==
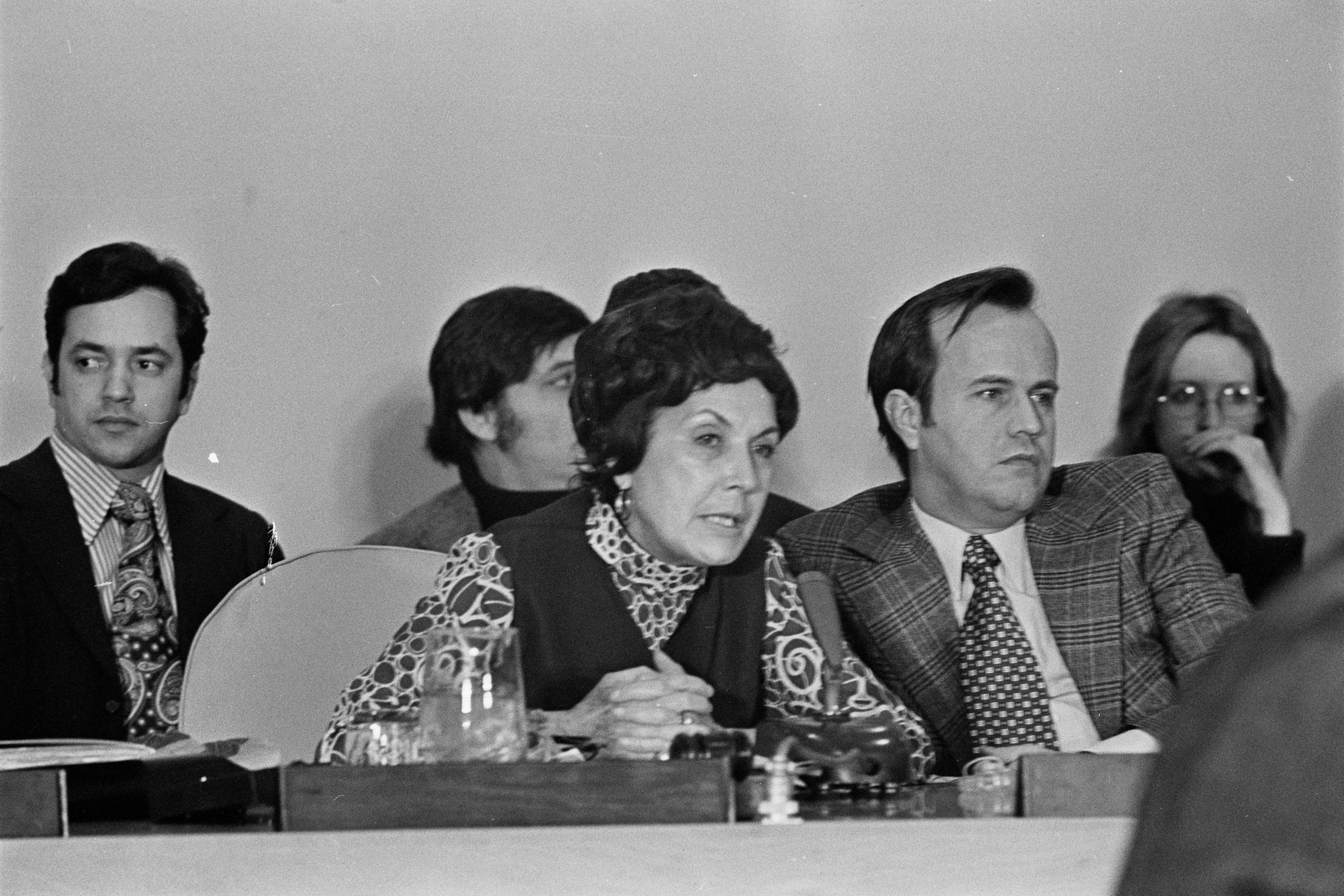
Bussi (center) testifies before the United Nations Commission on Human Rights, February 25, 1974. She was sponsored by Cuba's Permanent Representative to the UN, Ricardo Alarcón (right).

After the military coup which overthrew her husband, Bussi went into exile in Mexico, and campaigned against the Pinochet regime. In 1975, she was a member of the jury at the 9th Moscow International Film Festival, and in 1977 she stood as a candidate for Rector of the University of Glasgow, losing to the student John Bell.

Bussi returned to Chile in 1988 after 17 years in exile and led a quiet life.

== Personal life ==
Bussi was the sister-in-law of the politician Laura Allende, and was the aunt of Andrés Pascal Allende, a sociologist, former Secretary General to the MIR and a prominent member of the Chilean Resistance and Solidarity Movement, and Denise Pascal, a politician.

On 18 June 2009 Bussi died in Santiago, aged 94, and was buried at Santiago General Cemetery.

== Notes ==
Honorary titles
Preceded by María Ruiz-Tagle Jiménez	First Lady of Chile; 1970–1973	Succeeded by Lucía Hiriart
