= Allende (surname) =

Allende is a Spanish surname meaning "on the other side". Notable people with the surname include:

- Andrés Pascal Allende (b. 1943), Chilean revolutionary and nephew of Salvador Allende
- Fernando Allende (b. 1952), Mexican entertainer
- Ignacio Allende (1769–1811), Captain of the Spanish Army in Mexico
- Ignacio Allende Fernández (b. 1969), Spanish porn actor and producer
- Isabel Allende (politician) (b. 1945), Chilean politician and daughter of Salvador Allende
- Isabel Allende (b. 1942), Chilean writer
- Jorge Allende (b. 1934), Chilean biologist
- Laura Allende (1911–1981), Chilean politician and sister of Salvador Allende
- Leonor Allende (1883–1931), Argentine writer and journalist
- Marcelo Allende (born 1999), Chilean footballer
- Paula Frías Allende (1963–1992), daughter of the writer Isabel Allende
- Salvador Allende (1908–1973), President of Chile
- Tadeo Allende (born 1999), Argentine footballer
- Walberto Allende (born 1955), Argentine politician

== Fictional characters ==
- Agustin Allende, a character in the 2010 video game Red Dead Redemption

== See also ==
- Allende family, a political family in Chile
