= Palazzo degli Alessandri =

Palazzo degli Alessandri may refer to:

- Palazzo degli Alessandri, Florence
- Palazzo degli Alessandri, Viterbo

== See also ==
- Alessandri (disambiguation)
