= Javiera Balmaceda =

Chilean and American film and television producer (born 1972)

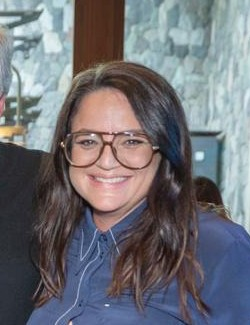
- Balmaceda in 2024
- Born: Javiera Balmaceda Pascal; October 4, 1972 (age 53); Chile
- Education: Wesleyan University
- Occupations: Film producer; television producer
- Children: 2
- Relatives: Pedro Pascal (brother); Lux Pascal (sister); Laura Allende (great-aunt); Fernando Riera (great-uncle); Denise Pascal (second cousin); Andrés Pascal Allende (second cousin); Mateo de Toro Zambrano (7th great-grandfather)
- Family: Alessandri family; Allende family; Balmaceda family

Javiera Balmaceda Pascal (born 1972) is a Chilean and American film and television producer, and the head of content for Amazon Prime Video Latin America, Canada, and Australia.

== Early life and education ==
Javiera Balmaceda Pascal was born on October 4, 1972 in Chile to Verónica Pascal Ureta (1953–2000), a child psychologist, and José Balmaceda Riera (born 1948), a reproductive endocrinologist. Balmaceda's paternal grandmother, Juanita Riera Bauzá was the sister of Fernando Riera, a professional association football player and coach. The seventh great-granddaughter of Mateo de Toro Zambrano, Balmaceda is related to the aristocratic Alessandri, Allende, and Balmaceda family. Balmaceda is the great-niece of Laura Allende, a politician and sister of Salvador Allende, President of Chile, and is the second cousin of Denise Pascal, a Socialist Party politician, and Andrés Pascal Allende, a sociologist, former Secretary General of the Movement of the Revolutionary Left and prominent member of the Chilean Resistance and Solidarity Movement.

In 1975, aged 3, Balmaceda's family received political asylum in Denmark before settling in San Antonio, Texas. The family later settled in Orange County, California. Balmaceda is the older sister of the actors Pedro Pascal and Lux Pascal, and Nicolás Balmaceda Pascal, a doctor. Balmaceda attended Corona Del Mar High School before studying art and economics at Wesleyan University.

== Career ==
Balmaceda first worked as an economist at JPMorgan Chase. Balmaceda subsequently for worked Locomotion, Claro Video, Comedy Central, Cartoon Network, and Boomerang.

From 2014 to 2017, Balmaceda was the programming director for HBO Latin America. In 2017, Balmaceda began working for Amazon Studios and later became the head of content for Prime Video Latin America, Canada, and Australia.

== Personal life ==
Balmaceda is married to the Argentinian producer Fernando Gastón, with whom she has two children.
