= Pedro Pascal =

Chilean and American actor (born 1975)

- Pascal in 2026
- Born: José Pedro Balmaceda Pascal; April 2, 1975 (age 51); Santiago, Chile
- Other names: Pedro Balmaceda; Alexander Pascal
- Education: New York University (BFA)
- Occupation: Actor
- Years active: 1996–present
- Works: Full list
- Relatives: Javiera Balmaceda (sister); Lux Pascal (sister); Laura Allende (great-aunt); Fernando Riera (great-uncle); Denise Pascal (second cousin); Andrés Pascal Allende (second cousin); Mateo de Toro Zambrano (7th great-grandfather)
- Family: Alessandri family; Allende family; Balmaceda family

José Pedro Balmaceda Pascal (Spanish: [xoˈse ˈpeðɾo‿βalmaˈseða pasˈkal]; born April 2, 1975) is a Chilean and American actor. Known for his portrayals of parental figures on screen and stage, he has received numerous accolades including an Actor Award, in addition to nominations for a Golden Globe Award and four Primetime Emmy Awards. Time magazine named him one of the 100 most influential people in the world in 2023.

After nearly two decades of taking small roles on stage and television, Pascal's breakout roles came as Oberyn Martell in the fourth season of the HBO fantasy series Game of Thrones (2014) and as Javier Peña in the Netflix crime series Narcos (2015–2017). He achieved international stardom for his leading roles as Din Djarin in the Disney+ science fiction series The Mandalorian (2019–2023) and Joel Miller in the HBO post-apocalyptic drama series The Last of Us (2023–present), earning him a reputation for portraying adoptive father figures. His performance in The Last of Us earned him numerous accolades, including an Actor Award for Outstanding Male Actor in a Drama Series.

In film, Pascal is known for portraying Reed Richards / Mister Fantastic in the Marvel Cinematic Universe, beginning with The Fantastic Four: First Steps (2025) and the upcoming Avengers: Doomsday (2026). He has also starred in the films Wonder Woman 1984 (2020), The Wild Robot (2024), Gladiator II (2024), Materialists (2025), The Mandalorian and Grogu (2026), and Behemoth! (2026).

On stage, Pascal has appeared in various theater productions. He made his Broadway debut as Edmund in a 2019 adaptation of King Lear.

== Early life ==
José Pedro Balmaceda Pascal was born on April 2, 1975, in Santiago, Chile, to Verónica Pascal Ureta (1953–2000), a child psychologist, and José Balmaceda Riera (1948–), a reproductive endocrinologist. Pascal has an older sister, film and television producer Javiera Balmaceda, a younger sister, actress Lux, and a younger brother. Pascal's paternal grandmother, Juanita Riera Bauzá, was born in Palma de Mallorca, and was the sister of Fernando Riera, a professional association football player and coach.

The seventh great-grandson of Mateo de Toro Zambrano and also descendant of José Santiago Aldunate y Toro, Pascal is related to the aristocratic Alessandri, Allende, and Balmaceda families. Pascal is the great-nephew of Laura Allende, a politician and sister of Salvador Allende, President of Chile, and the second cousin of Denise Pascal, a Socialist Party politician, and Andrés Pascal Allende, a sociologist, former Secretary General of the Movement of the Revolutionary Left and prominent member of the Chilean Resistance and Solidarity Movement.

Two years before Pascal's birth, the democratically elected socialist government of President Salvador Allende was overthrown by General Augusto Pinochet, leading to the country becoming a military dictatorship. Both of Pascal's parents were listed as enemies of the state by the Pinochet regime and the family eventually fled Chile when he was nine months old, after seeking refuge in the Venezuelan embassy in Santiago for six months. The family later received political asylum in Denmark, before settling in the United States, where Pascal was raised in San Antonio, Texas, until they relocated to Orange County, California, when he was eleven years old. By the time he was eight years old, his family regularly visited Chile to see his 34 cousins.

Pascal pursued acting at the Orange County School of the Arts and graduated in 1993, before attending New York University's Tisch School of the Arts, where he graduated in 1997. His parents returned to Chile in 1995 after his father Dr. José P. Balmaceda was accused of stealing fertility patients' eggs and embryos and implanting them in other women without their knowledge and consent. After his mother's death, he began using his maternal surname professionally as a tribute to her and because he felt that people in the US had difficulty pronouncing his paternal surname, Balmaceda.

== Career ==
=== 1999–2013: Early work ===
"My vision of it was that if I didn't have some major exposure by the time I was twenty-nine years old, it was over, so I was constantly readjusting what it meant to commit my life to this profession, and giving up the idea of it looking like I thought it would when I was a kid. There were so many good reasons to let that delusion go."

— Pascal on his aspirations as an actor early in his career.

Early in his career, Pascal appeared in several television series, including Buffy the Vampire Slayer, NYPD Blue, The Good Wife, Nurse Jackie, and Homeland. Pascal experienced hard times during that point in his career; besides working in small acting and theatre roles, he took jobs waiting at restaurants. Pascal admitted that he was fired "often, upwards of, I don't know, maybe close to 10 times". In times of extreme hardship, Pascal's close friend Sarah Paulson would give him her per diem money "so that he could have money to feed himself." At a point when he found difficulty in affording medical care, only having less than seven dollars in his bank account, he received a residual check from his role in Buffy, which helped him to restabilize his finances and allowed him to continue pursuing acting.

Pascal is a member of New York City's LAByrinth Theater Company. He received the Los Angeles Drama Critics Circle Award and Garland Award for his role in the International City Theater production of Orphans, and has performed in classical and contemporary works. In 2005, Pascal made his feature film debut in Julia Solomonoff's Sisters. For Pascal's role, Solomonoff was looking for candidates with strong English-language skills. In addition to meeting this requirement, Pascal (then credited as Balmaceda) was found to be "someone with a very special face, very photogenic, with a kind of mystery" by Solomonoff. In 2010, he wrote a play, directed by Sarah Silverman, Flaca Loves Bone, about four siblings who meet in a snowy wood to uncover a family secret. Also in 2010, Pascal made his directorial debut with Killing Play, written by David Anzuelo, at Rattlestick Playwrights Theater. He also directed underneathmybed and Yosemite there. He was cast in the pilot for the 2011 Wonder Woman television adaptation as Ed Indelicato, Wonder Woman's liaison to the LAPD, but the show was not picked up.

=== 2014–2018: Breakthrough and rise to fame ===
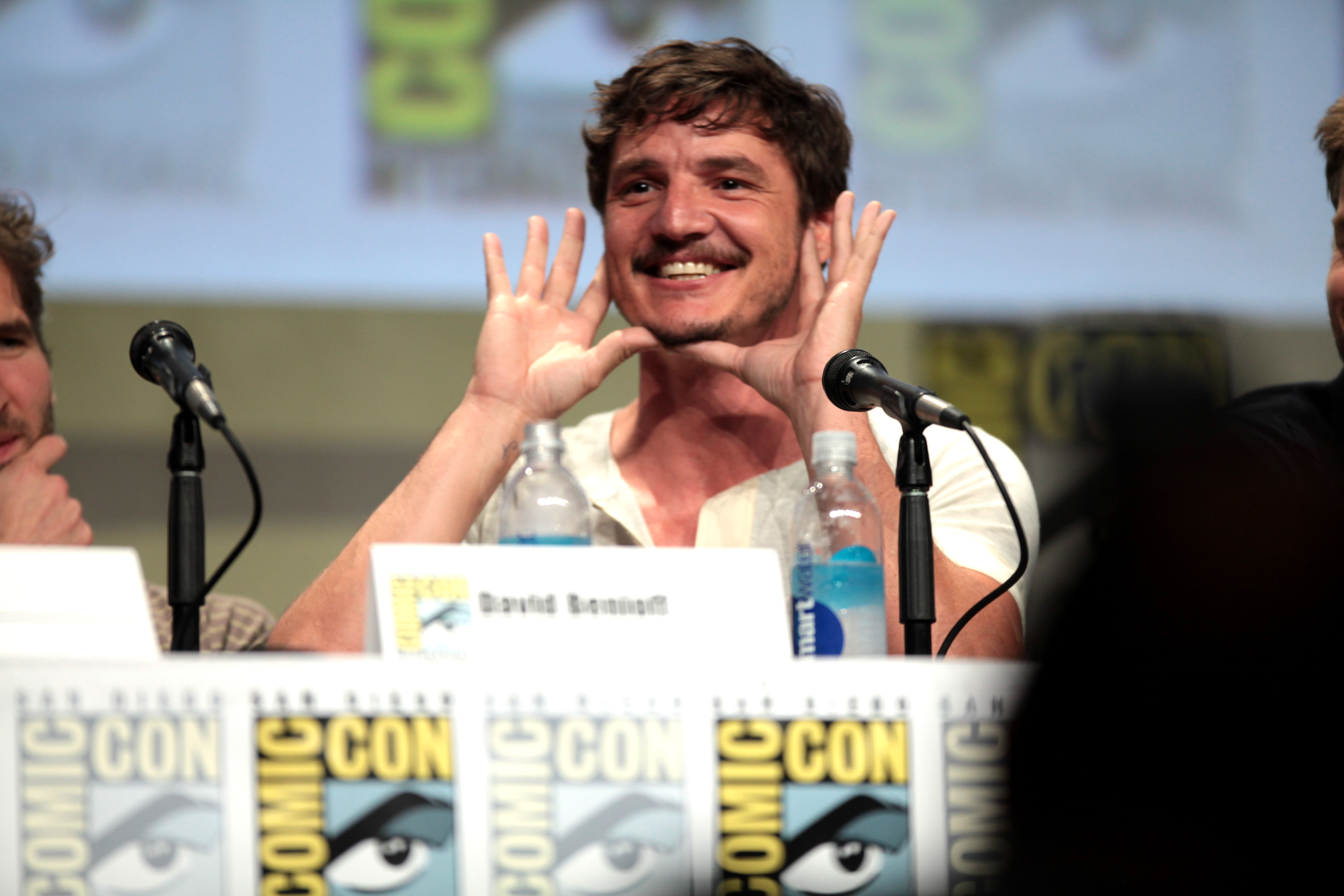
Pascal at the 2014 San Diego Comic Con

In 2014, Pascal portrayed the character Oberyn Martell in the fourth season of HBO's critically acclaimed television series Game of Thrones. The season aired from April 6 to June 15, 2014, and Pascal's performance as the passionate and vengeful Dornish prince garnered significant praise from both critics and audiences, with numerous publications, including CNET, The Mary Sue, Time, and Esquire naming Martell as one of the best characters in the show. The Los Angeles Times praised him as a sex symbol in the role, calling it "the real tipping point in his career". Pascal stated that he was a huge fan of the show before being cast as Oberyn and was ecstatic to join. As part of the ensemble, he has received an Actor Award nomination for Outstanding Performance by an Ensemble in a Drama Series.

In 2015, Pascal portrayed the vampire Max in Bloodsucking Bastards. In April, Pascal co-starred with Heidi Klum in the music video for Sia's "Fire Meet Gasoline". In August, Pascal gained further recognition for his portrayal as Javier Peña, based on a real-life DEA agent, in the popular Netflix crime drama series Narcos. The show's two first seasons depict the rise and fall of the infamous drug lord Pablo Escobar and the subsequent Medellín Cartel, as the show's focus shifted to the Cali Cartel for its third and final season, Pascal took on the role of both lead actor and narrator.

In 2016, he portrayed mercenary Pero Tovar in the fantasy action film The Great Wall, alongside Matt Damon, and directed by Zhang Yimou. Set against the backdrop of the Great Wall of China, the film follows European mercenaries who become embroiled in a battle against ancient creatures threatening humanity. Despite the film's visually stunning production and ambitious scope, it received mixed reviews for its narrative and character development. Filmed on location in Qingdao, China. Pascal has voiced his admiration for Zhang, whom he had been a fan of during his youth.

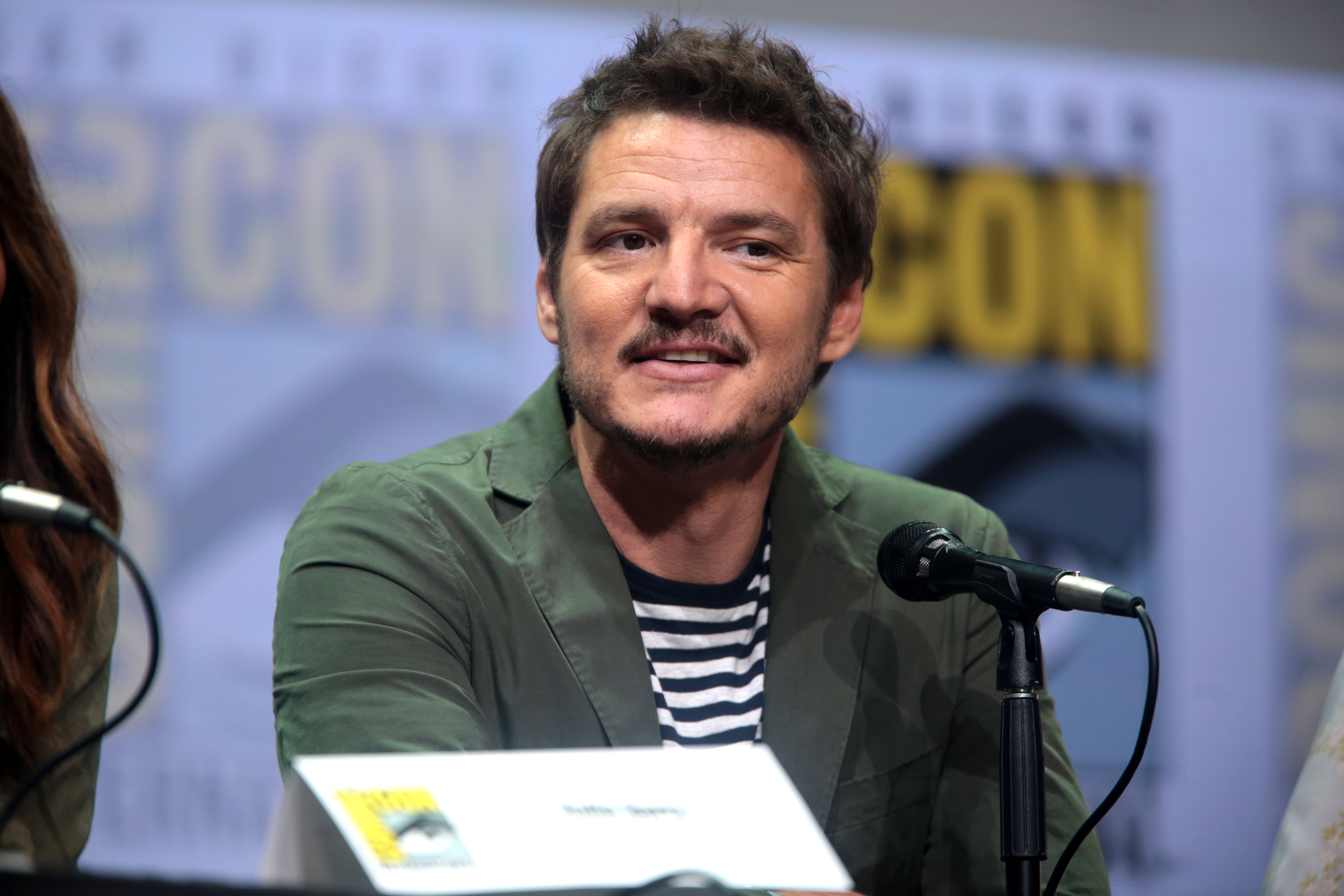
Pascal at the 2017 San Diego Comic Con

In 2017, Pascal portrayed the charismatic and skilled operative within the Statesman organization, Jack Daniels, also known as Agent Whiskey, in Matthew Vaughn's Kingsman: The Golden Circle. Writing for Collider, Chris Sasaguay called his character "one cool cowboy", observing his "genuine love for getting into a cutthroat brawl", and praising the "playful side that comes so easily to Pascal [...] which isn't lost in playing Whiskey, turning him into a worthy new character to stand beside the Kingsman agents".

In 2018, he starred as Dave York, the main antagonist, against Denzel Washington in the thriller sequel film The Equalizer 2. In Prospect, Pascal portrayed the character Ezra, a seasoned and enigmatic prospector navigating a dangerous alien moon in search of valuable resources. CNET's Monisha Ravisetti was "delightfully surprised when Pedro Pascal showed up in a burnt orange spacesuit", and Dais Johnston retroactively compared the role to Pascal's future characters in The Mandalorian and The Last of Us, writing for Inverse, "Pedro Pascal plays a gruff man who only looks out for himself until a child softens his heart". In If Beale Street Could Talk, directed by Barry Jenkins and based on James Baldwin's 1974 novel, Pascal made a cameo appearance as Pietro Alvarez, a frivolous yet crucial character who ultimately reveals a compassionate and empathetic side.

=== 2019–present: Worldwide recognition ===
In February 2019, Pascal made his Broadway debut in an adaptation of King Lear with Glenda Jackson and Ruth Wilson, where he took on the role of Edmund, the cunning and ambitious illegitimate son of the Earl of Gloucester. Since 2019, Pascal has portrayed the title role in The Mandalorian, the first live-action Star Wars television series, which debuted on Disney+, the show follows the adventures of a lone bounty hunter in the outer reaches of the galaxy. The role brought Pascal much wider recognition, and would later help establish him for his portrayals of father figures. The same year, he starred as Francisco "Catfish" Morales in the Netflix heist drama Triple Frontier, in which he portrays a helicopter pilot.

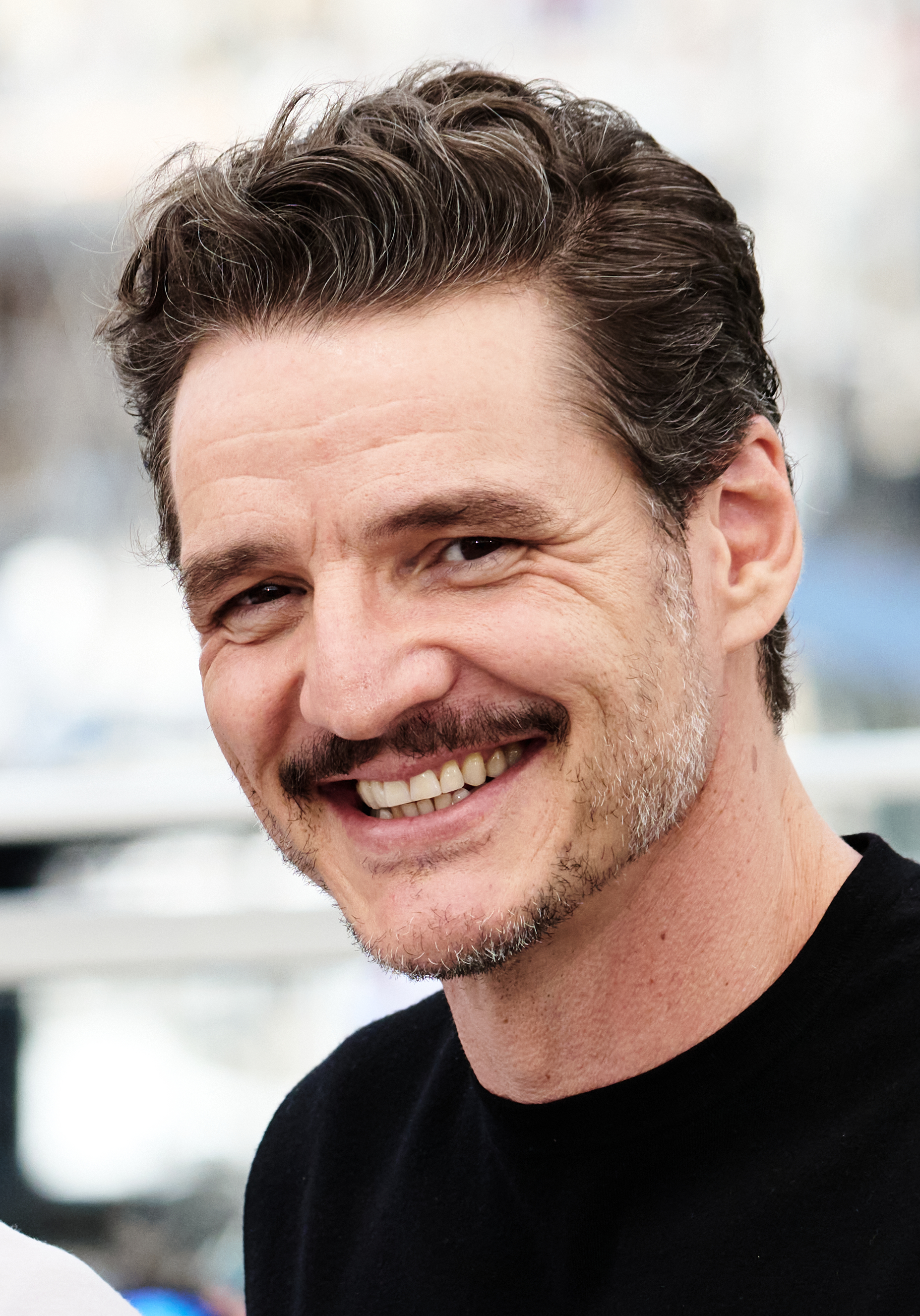
Pascal at the 2025 Cannes Film Festival

In 2020, he portrayed Maxwell Lord in the DC Extended Universe film Wonder Woman 1984, directed by Patty Jenkins. Following delays due to the COVID-19 pandemic, the film was released to theaters and HBO Max in December 2020. The Guardian's Peter Bradshaw called Pascal's character "a version of Norman Vincent Peale, the positive-thinking guru who was such an influence on presidents Nixon and Trump". The New York Times and the BBC both thought that Pascal was miscast for the role. In the film We Can Be Heroes, he played Marcus Moreno. Screen Rant commented on the paternal aspect of the character, "It certainly should be the case that Pascal's fatherly role in a children's movie portrays him as a truly loving and caring father, and that's exactly what [the character] does".

In early 2021, a video from a 2020 virtual play reading of I, My Ruination surfaced on multiple social media platforms of Pascal laughing hysterically then transitioning smoothly into crying. The video quickly became an internet meme, often being paired with the Beach House song "Space Song" to display themes of tragedy on social media.

In 2022, Pascal co-starred with Nicolas Cage in the action comedy film The Unbearable Weight of Massive Talent. His performance was widely praised by critics. A scene in which Pascal's character looks at a gruff and irritated Cage with a grin on his face while driving under the influence of LSD would spawn another internet meme on TikTok. It is commonly used humorously when two parties are in stark disagreement or conflict with each other over a topic in an exaggeratedly emotional fashion, and is paired with the 1969 Mama Cass song "Make Your Own Kind of Music". Pascal also appeared in The Bubble, Judd Apatow's satirical comedy exploring celebrity culture amidst the pandemic. Reviewing the film for The A.V. Club, Luke Y. Thompson called Pascal's character Dieter Bravo a "womanizer", and noted that the character's "fake 'ethnic' accent skewers what he likely has to endure regularly". Shot during the COVID-19 pandemic, the film portrays the protocols adopted during filming due to the event as "purposely a little off-center". He starred in Miu Miu's Women's Tales series short film, directed by Janicza Bravo, titled House Comes With a Bird. In November, he signed with Creative Artists Agency.

In 2023, Pascal starred in HBO's highly anticipated television adaptation, The Last of Us, based on the critically acclaimed 2013 video game, created by Craig Mazin and Neil Druckmann. He took on the role of Joel Miller, a hardened survivor in a post-apocalyptic world, tasked with protecting a young girl named Ellie, played by Bella Ramsey. Pascal reportedly received $600,000 per episode. Empire's John Nugent and /Film's Valerie Ettenhofer praised Pascal's performance as the best of his career, citing his ability to portray nuance and rare vulnerability. Druckmann called Ramsey and Pascal's chemistry "a joy." The characterization of the paternal dynamic in the role and the similarity of his character in The Mandalorian earned Pascal international recognition for portraying adoptive father figures. This massive surge in popularity led him to become dubbed "daddy" in internet culture. Around this time, Pascal became a prominent figure in meme culture, with several memes of him achieving viral status, including a meme from a clip of Pascal eating a sandwich during a guest episode of LADbible's "Snack Wars" YouTube series in which he appeared with The Mandalorian creator Jon Favreau. Several popular memes of Pascal were derived from The Last of Us episode "Kin", such as one from a scene where Joel is portrayed as having a panic attack, and others relating to his character's tendency to lean on furniture throughout the episode due to being in a constant state of fear.

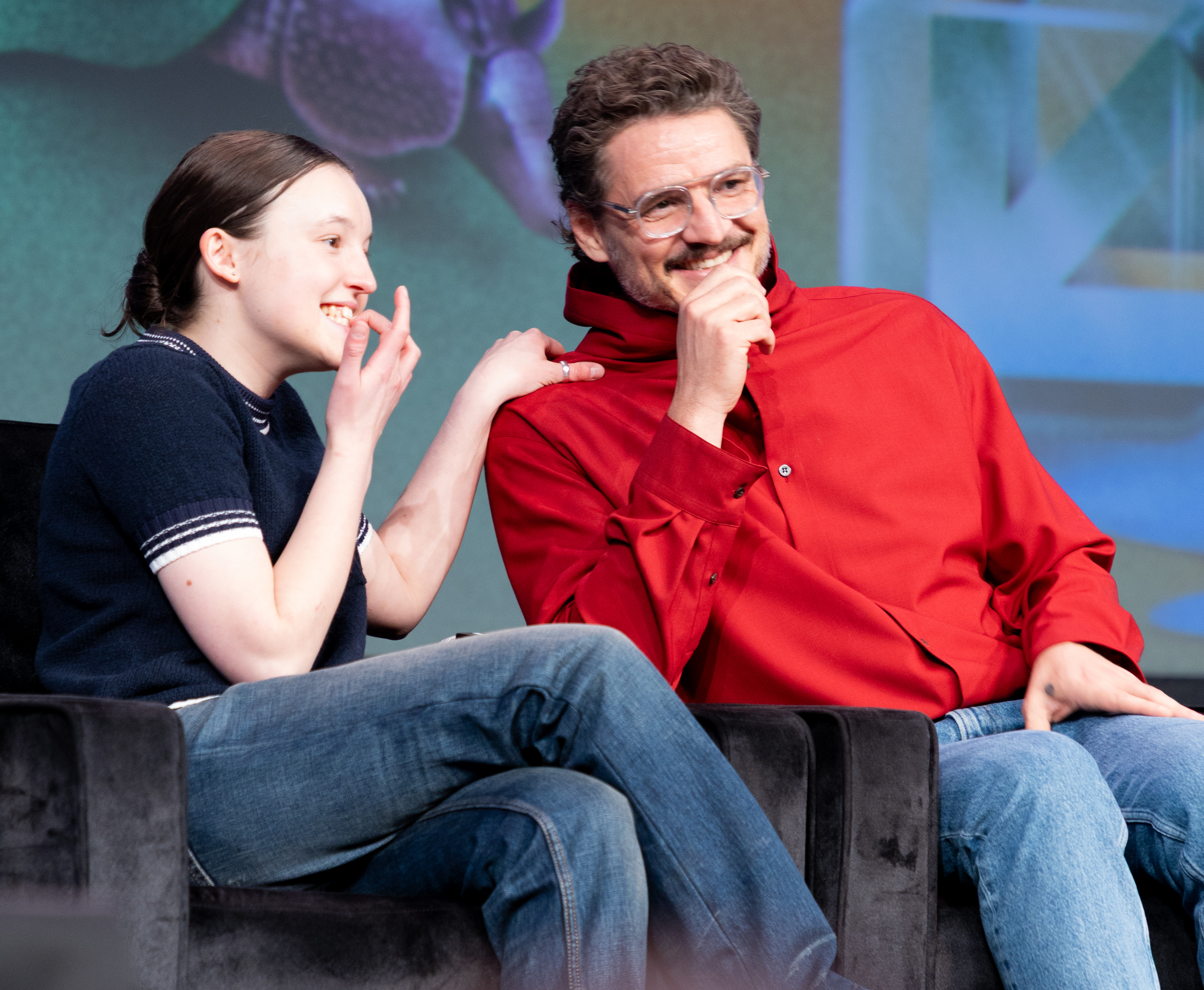
Pascal and Bella Ramsey at SXSW 2025

In February 2023, he hosted a Saturday Night Live episode, with Coldplay as the musical guest. In April, he was added to the cast of Ethan Coen's 2024 film Drive-Away Dolls, and Time magazine named him one of the 100 most influential people in the world. In May, he co-starred in the short film Strange Way of Life alongside Ethan Hawke, directed by Pedro Almodóvar. He played Silva, who reunites with Hawke's Jake in the two's older age. Pascal previously expressed his admiration for and desire to work with Almodóvar. Screen Rant noted it as another example of Pascal taking a role with the "dad" archetype. In June, Pascal was named by Carnegie Corporation of New York as an honoree of the Great Immigrants Award. In July, Pascal made history as the first Latino to receive three nominations in the same year for the 75th Primetime Emmy Awards. The nominations included Outstanding Lead Actor in a Drama Series for his portrayal in The Last of Us, Outstanding Guest Actor in a Comedy Series for his guest-hosting role in an episode of Saturday Night Live, and Outstanding Narrator for his narration in Patagonia: Life on the Edge of the World. Pascal also won the Actor Award for Outstanding Performance by a Male Actor in a Drama Series for The Last of Us in 2024.

In January 2024, he starred in Freaky Tales, directed by Anna Boden and Ryan Fleck. In June, musician Omar Apollo released his second studio album, God Said No, where Pascal features on the penultimate track, "Pedro", where he contributes a monologue about his heart being "shattered by something". In the animated feature The Wild Robot, he portrayed Fink, a fox who plays a parental role to a goose named Brightbill alongside Lupita Nyong'o's robot Roz. He next starred in Gladiator II, the sequel to Ridley Scott's 2000 film Gladiator. At the end of 2024, he was polled as Grindr's hottest man of the year. Around this time, Pascal was forced to drop-out of several high-profile films including Weapons and Crime 101, due to his packed schedule.

In 2025, Pascal appeared in Celine Song's romantic comedy Materialists, Ari Aster's neo-Western thriller Eddington, and portrayed Reed Richards / Mister Fantastic in the Marvel Cinematic Universe (MCU) film The Fantastic Four: First Steps. He is slated to reprise the role in the MCU films Avengers: Doomsday (2026) and Avengers: Secret Wars (2027). He reprised the role of Din Djarin in The Mandalorian & Grogu (2026).

Pascal's upcoming projects include starring in Todd Haynes's film De Noche; his casting in late 2025 was considered important in reviving the production after it had been stalled. He took on the lead role of Alex Serian in the thriller film Behemoth!, written and directed by Tony Gilroy. He rescued both projects from being abandoned after their initial stars backed out.

== Personal life ==
After moving to New York City in 1993, Pascal developed a close friendship with actress Sarah Paulson. Pascal is also close friends with Oscar Isaac, as the two actors met while appearing in a 2005 off-Broadway production of Beauty of the Father. Isaac and Pascal would later appear together in the 2019 film Triple Frontier. While filming The Last of Us, he became close friends with Bella Ramsey, calling himself and Ramsey "linked souls".

Pascal has generally kept his romantic life private and has never publicly confirmed any romantic relationship. He has explained his decision by saying, "I just know that personal relationships are such a complex thing to navigate even without having this enormous lens on them."

When he was 24, Pascal rescued a pitbull mix named Gretta, who he claims "saved my life" in the aftermath of his mother's death and when he was a struggling actor living in Red Hook. He adopted a small dog Edgar in 2018.

=== Advocacy and beliefs ===
Pascal identifies as an agnostic and a progressive liberal. He is an advocate of LGBTQ+ rights and was supportive of his sister Lux Pascal when she came out as transgender. Lux said, "He has been an important part of this. He is also an artist and has been a guide. He was one of the first to give me the things that formed my identity." Pascal has described his protective side as "lethal" when discussing his sister. In April 2025, Pascal appeared at the London premiere of Marvel's Thunderbolts* wearing a "Protect the Dolls" t-shirt, a statement piece by designer Conner Ives where "Dolls" is a term often used to refer to transgender women. His choice to wear the shirt came shortly before Pascal condemned author J. K. Rowling, calling her a "heinous loser" in an Instagram comment, after she celebrated the For Women Scotland Ltd v The Scottish Ministers ruling, which allowed for the exclusion of trans women from "single-sex services for women".

On Christmas Eve 2023, Pascal called for a ceasefire in the Gaza war and urged donations to Doctors Without Borders. On March 1, 2025, Pascal posted in support of Ukraine on Instagram, writing, "Stay on the right side of history. Glory to Ukraine", after U.S. President Donald Trump and Vice President JD Vance's public criticisms of Ukrainian President Volodymyr Zelenskyy. In May 2025, Pascal signed an open letter criticizing the film industry's "passivity" during the ongoing Gaza genocide. On January 10, 2026, Pascal and American-Palestinian model Bella Hadid hosted an Artists for Aid benefit concert at the Fonda Theatre in Los Angeles to support humanitarian relief in Palestine and Sudan. The event was organized by Sudanese-Canadian musician Mustafa, and all proceeds were split between the Sudanese American Physicians Association and the Palestinian Children's Relief Fund. The concert featured performances by artists including Mustafa, Omar Apollo, Clairo, Snoh Aalegra, and Shawn Mendes, among others.

In May of 2025, while promoting his film "Eddington" at the Cannes Film Festival, Pascal was asked about recent deportations in the U.S.. Pascal said it was "scary for an actor who participated in the movie to speak on issues like this". The film Eddington is set during the COVID-19 pandemic and it depicts a standoff between a small town sheriff, (played by Joaquin Pheonix), and mayor (Pedro Pascal) in the fictional town of Eddington, New Mexico. Pascal stated "I want people to be safe and protected...I am an immigrant. My parents are refugees from Chile. We fled a dictatorship and I was privileged enough to grow up in the United States after asylum in Denmark."

== Acting credits ==
Beginning his career in 1996, Pascal's highest rated film and television projects, according to the review aggregate site Rotten Tomatoes, include: The Uninvited (2024), The Last of Us (2023–present), If Beale Street Could Talk (2018), Calls (2021), The Good Wife (2009–2011), The Mandalorian (2019–2023), Prospect (2018), Narcos (2015–2017), Game of Thrones (2014), and Graceland (2013–2014).

== Awards and nominations ==
Association	Year	Category	Project	Result	Ref.
Actor Awards	2015	Outstanding Performance by an Ensemble in a Drama Series	Game of Thrones	Nominated	
Actor Awards	2024	Outstanding Performance by a Male Actor in a Drama Series	The Last of Us	Won	
Actor Awards	2024	Outstanding Performance by an Ensemble in a Drama Series	The Last of Us	Nominated	
Astra Film Awards	2024	Best Voice Over Performance	The Wild Robot	Nominated	
Astra Creative Arts TV Awards	2023	Best Guest Actor in a Comedy Series	Saturday Night Live	Won	
Astra TV Awards	2023	Best Actor in a Broadcast Network or Cable Series—Drama	The Last of Us	Won	
Critics' Choice Awards	2024	Best Actor in a Drama Series	The Last of Us	Nominated	
Critics' Choice Super Awards	2021	Best Actor in a Science Fiction/Fantasy Series	The Mandalorian	Nominated	
Critics' Choice Super Awards	2024	Best Actor in a Science Fiction/Fantasy Series	The Last of Us	Won	
Critics' Choice Super Awards	2025	Best Actor in a Science Fiction/Fantasy Series	The Last of Us	Won	
Critics' Choice Super Awards	2026	Best Actor in a Superhero Movie	The Fantastic Four: First Steps	Nominated	
Fargo Film Festival	2019	Best Actor	Prospect	Won	
Golden Globe Awards	2024	Best Actor in a Television Series—Drama	The Last of Us	Nominated	
HCA Midseason Awards	2022	Best Supporting Actor	The Unbearable Weight of Massive Talent	Runner-up	
Imagen Foundation Awards	2016	Best Actor—Television	Narcos	Nominated	
Imagen Foundation Awards	2021	Best Actor—Feature Film	Wonder Woman 1984	Nominated	
Imagen Foundation Awards	2023	Best Actor—Drama	The Last of Us	Won	
MTV Movie & TV Awards	2021	Best Duo	The Mandalorian	Nominated	
MTV Movie & TV Awards	2021	Best Hero	The Mandalorian	Nominated	
MTV Movie & TV Awards	2023	Best Duo (shared with Bella Ramsey)	The Last of Us	Won	
MTV Movie & TV Awards	2023	Best Hero	The Last of Us	Won	
People's Choice Awards	2024	The Male TV Star of The Year	The Last of Us	Won	
People's Choice Awards	2024	The Drama TV Star of the Year	The Last of Us	Nominated	
Primetime Emmy Awards	2023	Outstanding Lead Actor in a Drama Series	The Last of Us (episode: "Kin")	Nominated	
Primetime Emmy Awards	2023	Outstanding Guest Actor in a Comedy Series	Saturday Night Live (episode: Pedro Pascal/Coldplay)	Nominated	
Primetime Emmy Awards	2023	Outstanding Narrator	Patagonia: Life on the Edge of the World	Nominated	
Primetime Emmy Awards	2025	Outstanding Lead Actor in a Drama Series	The Last of Us	Nominated	
Teen Choice Awards	2018	Choice Fight (shared with Colin Firth and Taron Egerton)	Kingsman: The Golden Circle	Nominated	
