= Lux Pascal =

American and Chilean actor and transgender activist (born 1992)

- Pascal at the 2026 Met Gala
- Born: Lucas Balmaceda Pascal; June 4, 1992 (age 34); Orange County, California, U.S.
- Education: Pontifical Catholic University of Chile (BA); Juilliard School (MFA)
- Occupation: Actress
- Years active: 2011–present
- Partner: José Antonio Raffo (2011–present)
- Relatives: Javiera Balmaceda (sister); Pedro Pascal (brother); Laura Allende (great-aunt); Fernando Riera (great-uncle); Denise Pascal (second cousin); Andrés Pascal Allende (second cousin); Mateo de Toro Zambrano (7th great-grandfather)
- Family: Alessandri family; Allende family; Balmaceda family

Lux Balmaceda Pascal (born June 4, 1992) is an American and Chilean actress and transgender activist. She is known for her roles in the Chilean television series Veinteañero a los 40 and Juana Brava and the Chilean drama film The Prince.

== Early life ==
Lux was born in California as Lucas Balmaceda in Orange County, California, to Chilean exiles Verónica Pascal Ureta, a child psychologist, and José Balmaceda Riera, a reproductive endocrinologist. The youngest of four siblings, Pascal is the sister of producer Javiera Balmaceda, actor Pedro Pascal and Nicolás Balmaceda Pascal, a doctor.

When she was three years old, her family returned to Chile where she attended Saint George's College. In 2010, Lux began studying theater at the Pontifical Catholic University of Chile. In May 2023, she graduated from Juilliard School with an MFA in acting.

== Career ==
In 2014, during her fourth year of studying theater, Pascal made her stage debut in Pablo Rotemberg's play La noche obstinada. That same year, she landed her first television role on Canal 13's series Los 80, where she played Axel Miller. In 2015, she co-starred in the TVN soap opera Juana Brava, and the following year, she acted in the soap opera Veinteañero a los 40 on Canal 13. Lux made her film debut in 2016 in Prueba de actitud, directed by Fabrizio Copano and Augusto Matte.

In 2017, Pascal appeared in an international series for the first time, playing the role of Elias in the third season of the Netflix series Narcos, alongside her brother Pedro.

In 2019, Lux participated in three Chilean film productions: No quiero ser tu hermano, directed by Sebastián Badilla, Ella es Cristina, directed by Gonzalo Maza, and the LGBT drama The Prince, directed by Sebastián Muñoz.

In February 2021, she publicly announced that she is a transgender woman and began going by the name Lux Pascal, reflecting her maternal surname.

She landed her first leading role in a film in the 2025 film Miss Carbón, in which she played Carla Antonella Rodríguez, a trans woman who became the first woman miner in Patagonia. She attended the Met Gala in 2026, wearing a custom gown by Cult Gaia.

== Personal life ==
She has been in a relationship with actor José Antonio Raffo since 2011. She publicly came out as a transgender woman in a 2021 interview with Revista Ya; in the interview, she discussed her family's support for her transition and encouraged others to "speak out against transphobia, homophobia and racism".

== Family history ==
The seventh great-granddaughter of Mateo de Toro Zambrano, Pascal is related to the aristocratic Alessandri, Allende, and Balmaceda family. Pascal is the great-niece of Laura Allende, a politician and sister of Salvador Allende, President of Chile, and is the second cousin of Denise Pascal, a Socialist Party politician, and Andrés Pascal Allende, a sociologist, former Secretary General of the Movement of the Revolutionary Left and prominent member of the Chilean Resistance and Solidarity Movement. Her paternal grandmother, Juanita Riera Bauzá, was the sister of Fernando Riera, a professional association football player and coach.

== Theater ==
- 2014: La noche obstinada
- 2017: Tebas Land
- 2019: Kassandra
- 2025: Richard II

== Filmography ==
=== Film ===
- 2011: Baby Shower
- 2016: Prueba de actitud
- 2019: No quiero ser tu hermano
- 2019: Ella es Cristina
- 2019: El príncipe
- 2024: Bust (short film)
- 2024: Queen of Coal
- 2027: Cry to Heaven

=== Television ===
- 2014: Los 80
- 2015: Veinteañero a los 40
- 2015: Juana Brava
- 2017: Narcos
- 2017: 12 días que estremecieron Chile
- 2018: Santiago Paranormal
- 2019: Héroes invisibles
- 2019–20: La jauría
- 2026: The Beauty
