= Alende =

Alende is a surname. Notable people with the surname include:

- Claudia Alende (born 1995), Brazilian singer, model, and businesswoman
- Diego Alende (born 1997), Spanish footballer
- Oscar Alende (1909–1996), Argentine politician

== See also ==
- Alender
- Allende (surname)
