= Alessandri =

Alessandri may also refer to:

- Alessandri (surname)
- Alessandri family, family of Chile

== See also ==
- Alessandria (disambiguation)
- Palazzo degli Alessandri, Florence
- Palazzo degli Alessandri, Viterbo
