= Laura Allende =

Chilean politician (1911–1981)

Laura Allende Gossens
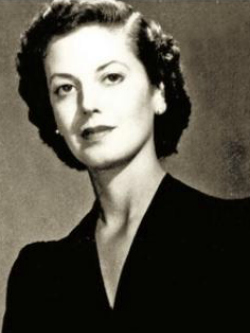

Deputy of the Republic of Chile for the 7th Departmental Group, Santiago and the 2nd Departmental Group, Talagante
- In office 1965–1969
- President: Eduardo Frei Montalva
- In office 1969–1973
- President: Salvador Allende
- In office 1973 – 21 September 1973 ^{α}
- Succeeded by: Congress dissolved

Personal details
- Born: 3 September 1911 Valparaíso, Chile
- Died: 23 May 1981 (aged 69) Hotel Riviera, Havana, Cuba
- Resting place: Santiago General Cemetery
- Party: Socialist Party of Chile
- Children: 4, including: Andrés Pascal Allende; Denise Pascal
- Parent: Salvador Allende Castro (father)
- Relatives: Allende family; Ramón Allende Padín (paternal grandfather); Salvador Allende (brother); Isabel Allende (niece); Beatriz Allende (niece); Maya Fernández (great-niece); Javiera Balmaceda (great-niece); Pedro Pascal (great-nephew); Lux Pascal (great-niece)
- Education: La Universidad de Chile en Valparaíso
- Occupation: Politician

Laura Sofía Allende Gossens (3 September 1911 – 23 May 1981) was a Chilean politician and member of the Allende family.

== Early life and education ==
Allende was born on 3 September 1911 in Valparaíso, the youngest daughter of Salvador Allende Castro and Laura Gossens Uribe. Through her father, Allende was a member of the Allende family, a prominent Chilean political family. Allende's older brother was the Doctor and Chilean President, Salvador Allende.

Educated at the Colegio de los Sagrados Corazones de Valparaíso-Viña del Mar and the Liceo de Viña del Mar, Allende studied law at the Universidad de Chile en Valparaíso (present-day University of Valparaíso). While at the university Allende joined The Socialist Youth of Chile, the youth wing of Socialist Party of Chile.

== Family ==
Allende married Gastón Pascal Lyon (1909–1993) and had four children, Pedro Gastón, Marianne, the Socialist Party of Chile politician Denise Pascal, and Andrés Pascal Allende the co-founder and secretary general of the Revolutionary Left Movement (MIR).

Through her brother Salvador, Allende was the aunt of Isabel Allende and Beatriz Allende. Beatriz's daughter Maya Fernández was Allende's great-niece. Through her niece Verónica Pascal Ureta (1953–2000), a child psychologist, Allende is the great-aunt of Javiera Balmaceda, a film and television producer, and the actors Pedro Pascal and Lux Pascal.

== Political career ==
From 1955–1965, Allende worked for the Copper Office (Departamento del Cobre). In 1965, Allende was elected Deputy of the Republic of Chile for Santiago and Talagante and was reelected twice in 1969 and 1973.

Allende was part of two international delegations to Havana in 1971 and to China in May 1973. At that time, she already was showing the initial symptoms of lymphatic cancer.

== Arrest ==
On 2 November 1974, Allende was arrested at her home with her daughter Marianne, and charged with involvement with the outlawed MIR. The same day Inés Alonso Boudat and Diana Beausire Alonso, the mother and sister of Andrés Pascal Allende's then wife Mary Ann Beausire Alonso, were also arrested. Mary Ann's brother, the commercial engineer William Beausire, was abducted by DINA agents at Ministro Pistarini International Airport, Buenos Aires.

Following Allende's arrest a communiqué by the Under Secretary of the Interior Enrique Montero Marx, posited that four grenades were found in Allende's home alongside letters and documents supporting the MIR. Allende was detained at the Tres Álamos political prison camp, and was held in the Cuatro Álamos isolation wing for a period of 5 months. During Allende's imprisonment, Gastón Pascal Lyon was also detained in isolation at Cuatro Álamos. On 6 November 1974, the Mexican Government offered to accept Allende as a political exile.

== Life in exile ==
On 21 March 1975, Allende was exiled from Chile indefinitely and was deported to Mexico alongside 94 other Chilean political exiles. In 1976, Sergio Insunza requested that the International Commission of Investigation into Crimes of the Military Junta in Chile (Spanish: Comisión Internacional de Investigación de Crímenes de la Junta Militar en Chile) heard Allende's testimony of her imprisonment.

From 1976 onwards Allende lived in Cuba. In 1979 Dr. Alejandro Artucio, a representative for the International Commission of Jurists, made an appeal to the Chilean authorities for Allende to be allowed to return from exile. Following a terminal cancer diagnosis, Allende died by suicide at the Hotel Riviera in Havana on the 23 May 1981. Allende left a suicide note for Fidel Castro, expressing the difficulty of her physical condition and her great sorrow that she couldn't return to Chile. On 25 May, the Committee for the Return of Exiles (Spanish: Comité Pro Retorno de Exiliados Chilenos) released a public statement.

Upon her ashes returning to Chile, a Requiem for Allende's was held on the 28 May 1988 in Santiago. On 28 August 1988, Allende was reinterred at the Allende family mausoleum in the Santiago General Cemetery.

== Notes ==
^α Mandate 1973–1977 was interrupted by the dissolution of the Chilean National Congress on 21 September 1973.
