= The Prince (2019 film) =

2019 film

- Film poster
- Directed by: Sebastián Muñoz
- Written by: Sebastián Muñoz; Luis Barrales
- Based on: El principe by Mario Cruz
- Produced by: Marianne Mayer-Beckh; Nicolás Grosso; Roberto Doveris
- Starring: Alfredo Castro; Juan Carlos Maldonado; Gastón Pauls
- Cinematography: Enrique Stindt
- Edited by: Danielle Fillios
- Music by: Ángela Acuña
- Production companies: Niña Niño Producciones; El Otro Film
- Distributed by: Storyboard Media
- Release dates: 29 August 2019 (Venice); 10 January 2020 (Spain)
- Running time: 96 minutes
- Countries: Chile; Mexico; Belgium; Argentina
- Language: Spanish
- Box office: $663

The Prince (Spanish: El Príncipe) is a 2019 drama film directed by Sebastián Muñoz, and co-written by Muñoz and Luis Barrales, based on an obscure 1970s novel written by Mario Cruz. Set around 1970 in a prison cell in San Bernardo, Chile, just prior to Salvador Allende's presidency, The Prince is a dark story about affections and loyalties between prisoners, the search for sexual identity, love, violence and the rise to power behind bars. The film is an international co-production film between Chile, Mexico, Belgium and Argentina.

The film made its world premiere in the Critic’s Week section at Venice International Film Festival 2019, winning the prestigious Queer Lion Prize. The Prince was also selected to compete at the 67th San Sebastián International Film Festival, in the 'Horizontes Latinos' section.

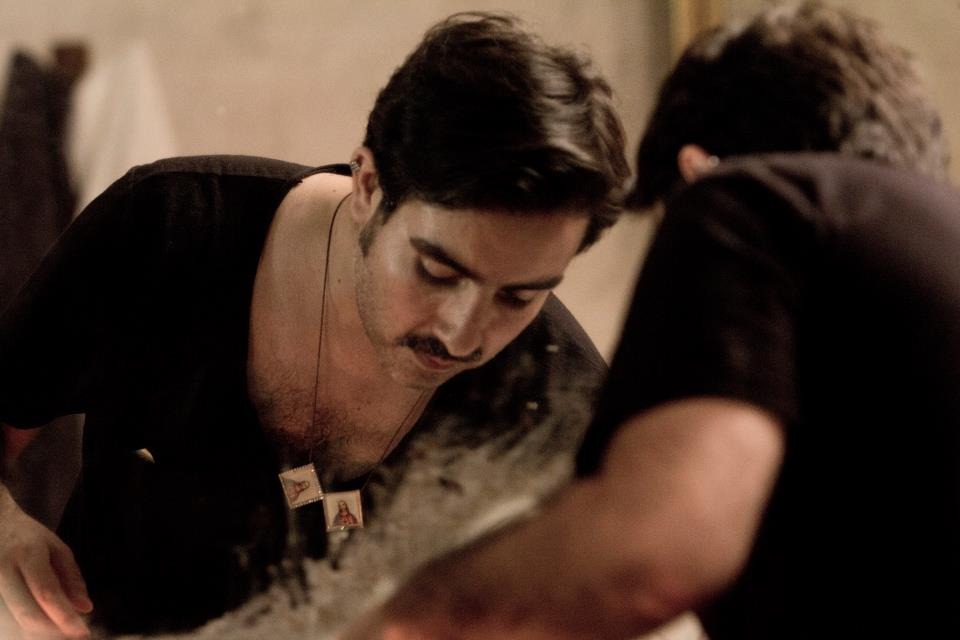
Sebastián Muñoz, director of El Príncipe

== Plot ==
Set in a Santiago prison in 1970, the film portrays Jaime, a young prisoner convicted of the violent and inexplicable murder of his best friend. He has a definitive encounter with "The Stallion," an older and powerful inmate who commands respect among the prisoners. Seeking protection, Jaime develops a relationship of affection and tenderness with the man, discovering love and the need for recognition. Later, as "The Prince," he rethinks his sexual identity and the reason for his incarceration.

== Cast ==
- Alfredo Castro as "The Stallion"
- Juan Carlos Maldonado as Jaime/"The Prince"
- Gastón Pauls as "Che Pibe"
- Sebastián Ayala as "The Abandoned"
- Lux Pascal as Dany/"The Rucio"
- Cesare Serra as "The Gypsy"
- José Antonio Raffo as López
- Paola Volpato as Elena
- Catalina Martin as Mónica
- Jaime Leiva as Miguel
- Nicolás Zárate as Julio
- Paula Zúñiga as the Stallion's woman
- Óscar Hernández as Prince's father
- Carlos Corales as Don Roberto
- Daniel Antivilo as El Tropical

== Production ==
The film is based on the sole novel by little-known author Mario Cruz, which was cherished many years ago by filmmaker Alicia Scherson, who was in talks with playwright Luis Barrales to prepare the script. Cruz's homoerotic novel has its heyday in the 70s, it was never available in bookstores and could only be acquired in the newsstands of San Diego Street, in Santiago, becoming a cult novel. Director Sebastián Muñoz found it by chance and, along with Barrales himself, refined the script to its final form.

Subsequently, the Chilean production team Niña Niño Films and El Otro Films, alongside the Argentine company Le Tiro Cine and the Belgian Be Revolution Pictures, joined the project. The cast was completed with veteran actors Alfredo Castro and Gastón Pauls, and young actors Juan Carlos Maldonado, Sebastián Ayala and Lux Pascal.

== Reception ==
At Venice, much of the Italian specialty press evaluated the film positively. Martina Barone at Cinematographe wrote: "a film of impetuous sensuality. A disturbing film, in its multifaceted sexual, emotional and primitive ferocity", Samuele Sestieri at PointBlank wrote: "The first work by Chilean filmmaker Sebastián Muñoz is a dazzling song of love and death, between pleasure and pain", Carlo Valeri at Sentieriselvaggi wrote: "A claustrophobic film, but at the same time full of desiring impulses. Asphyxiating and passionate as a last hug before saying goodbye". At the end of the festival, the film was awarded the Queer Lion:

El Príncipe is a passionate portrait of life in a Chilean prison on the eve of Allende’s rise to power in 1970. The savage brutality of prison life is contrasted by intensely emotional relationships between prisoners. Led by a towering Alfredo Castro, the excellent ensemble cast give stirring performances of a powerful script which conveys the paradoxical acceptance of gay attachments in prison at a time when it was not socially acceptable. Sebastián Muñoz’s directorial debut is a bold and erotically charged exploration of recent history which reveals an unexpected tenderness at its heart.

After Venice and positive reviews in Europe, the first American evaluation came from Boyd van Hoeij of The Hollywood Reporter (and a former Queer Lion juror himself), who negatively received the film; the bottom line being: "A prison fantasy devoid of personality."

On review aggregation website Rotten Tomatoes, The Prince holds a 94% approval rating based on 16 reviews, with an average of 7.7/10.

== Film festivals ==
Following its Venice premiere, The Prince saw exhibition at various other festivals, including San Sebastián, Chicago, Mill Valley, Busan and Valdivia.
