= Alessandri family =

Chilean political family of Italian descent

- Chilean Political family
- Founder: Giuseppe Pietro Alessandri Tarzi

The Alessandri family is a Chilean political family of Italian descent, which has been active in Chilean politics since the 19th century. Founded by Giuseppe Pietro Alessandri Tarzi, Alessandri arrived in the early 1800s as a consul posterior for the Kingdom of Sardinia.

== Members ==
- Giuseppe Pietro Alessandri Tarzi, (Note: Hispanicized as Pedro Alessandri Tarzi) founder of Alessandri family
  - Pedro Alessandri Vargas; married Susana Palma Guzmán
    - José Pedro Alessandri (1864–1923), engineer, businessperson and politician; married Julia Altamirano Talavera
      - Gustavo Alessandri Altamirano; married Elena Valdés Freire
        - Gustavo Alessandri Valdés (1929– 2017), lawyer, industrialist, agricultural businessperson and politician; married Verónica Balmaceda and Constanza Vergara Vicuña
          - Gustavo Alessandri Balmaceda (born 1961), businessperson and politician; married Soledad Bascuñán Rodríguez
          - Felipe Alessandri Vergara (born 1975), lawyer, politician, mayor of the Municipality of Santiago (2016-2021) and mayor of the Municipality of Lo Barnechea (2024-2028)
          - Jorge Alessandri Vergara (born 1979), lawyer and politician; married Teresita García de la Huerta
    - Arturo Alessandri Palma (1868–1950) lawyer, politician, 18th and 22nd President of Chile; married Rosa Rodríguez Velasco, First Lady of Chile during 1920–1925 and 1932–1938
      - Arturo Alessandri Rodríguez (1895–1970), lawyer, academic and civil law scholar; married Raquel Besa Montt
        - Arturo Alessandri Besa (1923-2022), lawyer and politician; married Nancy Cohn Montealegre
      - Jorge Alessandri Rodríguez (1896–1986), civil engineer, politician and 27th President of Chile
      - Fernando Alessandri Rodríguez (1897–1982), lawyer and politician; married Olga Lyon Vial and Juanita Izquierdo Huneeus
      - Hernán Alessandri Rodríguez (1900–1982), physician; married Sofía Montes Sutil, Loreto Morandé Campino and Luz Carvallo Stagg
        - Silvia Alessandri Montes (1927–2021), politician and nurse; married Hernán Calvo Salas
        - Hernán Alessandri Morandé (1935–2007), Schoenstatt priest and founder of the María Ayuda Corporación de Beneficencia
        - Rosa Alessandri Montes; married Raúl Devés (1917–1996), civil engineer, academic, and politician
          - Rosa Devés Alessandri (born 1950), biochemist, academic, educator and rector of the University of Chile since 2022; married Jorge Las Heras Bonetto, a physician
      - Eduardo Alessandri Rodríguez (1903–1973), lawyer and politician; married María Angélica Valdés Aldunate and Florencia Baraona Hausser

== Other notable members ==
- Magdalena Matte Lecaros (born 1950), civil engineer, businesswoman, politician; married Hernán Larraín (born 1947), lawyer, university lecturer, and politician; great-granddaughter of Arturo Alessandri Palma
  - Hernán Larraín Matte (born 1974), lawyer and politician
  - Pablo Larraín (born 1976), filmmaker; married Antonia Zegers (born 1972)
- Javiera Balmaceda (born 1972), producer; married Fernando Gastón
- Pedro Pascal (born 1975), actor
- Andrea Velasco (born 1981), actress and singer; granddaughter of Arturo Alessandri Besa
- Lux Pascal (born 1992), actress and transgender activist

== Timeline of elected positions ==
- Chamber of Deputies of Chile
- Senate of Chile
- President of Chile

== See also ==
- Alessandri (disambiguation)
- History of Chile
