= William Beausire =

British-Chilean engineer (1948–1974)

- Born: Guillermo Roberto Beausire Alonso; 3 December 1948
- Disappeared: 2 July 1975 (aged 26); Venda Sexy, Irán 3037, Macul, Santiago, Chile
- Status: Missing for 51 years, 4 months and 1 day
- Other names: William Robert Beausire; Bill Beausire
- Citizenship: British; Chilean
- Education: Commercial Engineering, Valparaíso Business School (Now Adolfo Ibáñez University), 1973
- Occupation: Commercial engineer
- Relatives: Andrés Pascal Allende (ex-brother-in-law)

Guillermo Roberto Beausire Alonso (born 3 December 1948 – disappeared 2 July 1975), anglicised as William Beausire, was a British-Chilean commercial engineer who was abducted by DINA agents at Ministro Pistarini International Airport, Buenos Aires on 2 November 1974. Returned to Chile, Beausire was held in various DINA torture and detention centres before his enforced disappearance on 2 July 1975.

== Early life and education ==
Beausire was born on 3 December 1948 into an upper class Anglo Chilean family. Beausire's father, Wilfrid Richard Beausire Pascal, was English and his mother, Rosa Herminia Inés Alonso Boudat, was Chilean. Through his parents Beausire held both British and Chilean citizenship. Beausire had three sisters, Juana Francisca, Diana and Mary Ann Beausire Alonso. The Beasuire family lived in the upper class Santiago communes of Las Condes and Providencia. In 1958, Beausire's father died.

In December 1973, Beausire graduated with a degree in Commercial Engineering from the then Valparaíso Business School (Now Adolfo Ibáñez University). At university Beausire joined the Humanist Movement, but was largely apolitical and reportedly enjoyed the privileges his social class afforded him. At the time of his arrest, Beausire had been living with his mother Inés Beausire in Providencia, and was working at the Santiago Stock Exchange and was studying economics.

== Forced disappearance ==
=== Arrest ===
On Saturday the 2 November 1974, Beausire boarded Lan Airline Flight 145 at Arturo Merino Benitez International Airport. Intending to relocate to Paris with the hope of working in the capital's financial sector, Beasire had planned a weekend layover in Buenos Aires before catching his connecting flight Lan Airline Flight 148 to France.

Less than an hour after Beausire’s plane had taken off in Santiago, his mother Inés and sister Diana were arrested by DINA agents at Inés Beausire’s home. The same day Laura Allende and Marianne Allende, the mother and sister of Mary Ann Beausire's partner Andrés Pascal Allende, were arrested and charged with involvement with the outlawed Revolutionary Left Movement.

Upon Beausire's arrival at Buenos Aires Ministro Pistarini International Airport Beasire was called over to the ″International Police Control″ desk. Beasuire was shown into the adjoining office and was subsequently beaten and detained in a bathroom by DINA agents.^{α} Sometime between the 3 – 6 November, Beasire was forcibly transported back to Chile on a Chilean Air Force plane, landing at Cerrillos airbase near Santiago.

=== Detention ===
On the 6 November 1974, Beausire was taken to José Domingo Cañas. It is thought Beausire was a target for DINA because his sister Mary-Anne opposed the regime, and was living with Andrés Pascal Allende, a revolutionary and leading member of the MIR, then in the underground opposition to the military regime, and nephew of deposed Popular Unity Chilean president Salvador Allende. It is thought Beausire was targeted in an attempt to find out where Mary-Anne and Andres Pascal were. Witnesses say that Beausire was given electric shocks, had sticks forced into his rectum and was hung in the air.

=== Disappearance ===
On 17 May 1975 he was taken to another DINA centre in Irán Street, Santiago. The last anyone heard of William Beausire was on 2 July of that year, when witnesses reported seeing DINA officers taking him from a building in Irán Street, Santiago.

=== Aftermath and international response ===
In June 1976, the UK Government referred the case to the United Nations.

In 1993, Tristan Garel-Jones MP presented the findings of the Chilean National Commission for Truth and Reconciliation Report to the House of Commons. The report concluded that Beausire had been arrested in Buenos Aires on the 2 November 1974, before being handed over to DINA custody, where he remained until his enforced disappearance.

=== Timeline of events ===
Dates	Places	Notes	Ref.
2 November 1974	Ministro Pistarini International Airport, Buenos Aires, Argentina	Place of arrest	
c. 3 – c. 6 November 1974	Cerrillos Military Airport, near Santiago, Chile	Forced return to Chile	
6 November 1974–c. December 1974	José Domingo Cañas, José Domingo Cañas 1367, Ñuñoa, Santiago, Chile	Arrival at DINA detention and torture centre	
5 December 1974 – January 1975	Villa Grimaldi, Avenida José Arrieta 8200, Peñalolén, Santiago, Chile		
May – July 1975	Venda Sexy, Irán 3037, Macul, Santiago, Chile	Also known as ″La Discothéque°	
2 July 1975	Venda Sexy, Irán 3037, Macul, Santiago, Chile	Place of enforced disappearance	

== In popular culture ==
Beausire case was highlighted in the 1981 BBC TV Prisoners of Conscience series, with Beausire being played by Richard Griffiths.

== Notes ==
^α Beausire was potentially detained by (Chilean) ″Servicio de Inteligencia de la Fuerza Aerea″ (SIFA) agents who then subsequently handed Beausire over to the DINA.

== See also ==
- List of people who disappeared mysteriously: 1910–1990
