= Juana Brava =

- Genre: Serial drama
- Created by: Ignacio Arnold; Nimrod Amitai
- Written by: Ignacio Arnold; Nimrod Amitai; Luis Bahamondes
- Directed by: Nimrod Amitai
- Starring: Elisa Zulueta; Lucas Balmaceda; Alejandro Trejo
- Country of origin: Chile
- Original language: Spanish
- No. of seasons: 1
- No. of episodes: 12

Production
- Executive producer: Alejandro Burr
- Production locations: Tiltil, Chile
- Production companies: Palta Films; Televisión Nacional de Chile

Original release
- Network: TVN
- Release: October 4, 2015

Juana Brava is a Chilean television series created by Ignacio Arnold and Nimrod Amitai and produced and aired by Televisión Nacional de Chile (TVN) during the second half of 2015. The series takes place in the fictional town of San Fermín, inspired by the Chilean town of Tiltil, and focuses on the abuse of power and the struggle of a simple woman to change a complex system dominated by large and powerful entities. It highlights conflicts between citizens, social problems, corruption, and the struggle for rights.

The series was originally titled The Mayor and was to be produced by Mega after the project received CLP$379,092,972 (US$765,422 in 2013) in funding from the National Television Council in 2013. Mega wanted an in-house team to develop the scripts, which Arnold and Amitai felt would lessen the quality of the product, leading them to end the partnership and take the project to TVN instead.

The series premiered on October 4, 2015.

== Plot ==
Juana Bravo (Elisa Zulueta) is a 33-year-old woman who, after 15 years in the capital, is forced to return to her hometown, the fictional San Fermín, where her father (Alejandro Trejo) is the mayor. When she comes back she realizes that things are not working properly and the town has become the site of landfills, prisons, and polluting industries that nobody else wants in their neighborhood. After discovering the irregularities, she faces both a corrupt system and family challenges. She is an idealistic and somewhat impulsive woman who works hard to gain the support of those who live in the town, believing she can change the system. But in her struggle she neglects her 16-year-old son, Diego (Lucas Balmaceda), who goes from being naive and lonely to an anti-establishment rebel.

== Cast ==
- Elisa Zulueta as Juana Bravo
- Alejandro Trejo as Ambrosio Bravo
- Lux Pascal (credited as Lucas Balmaceda) as Diego Bravo
- Gastón Salgado as Fidel Carmona
- Emilia Noguera as Paula "Poli" Montejo
- Daniel Guillón as Tomás
- Nelson Brodt as José "Pepe" Gallardo
- Paulina Urrutia as Hilda Salgado
- Willy Semler as Bernardo Maureira
- Andrés Skoknic as Darío Alcázar
- Mauricio Diócares as Jimmy
- Eyal Meyer as Esteban Quiroz
- Santiago Tupper as Gregorio Mancilla
- Daniela Palavecino as Marisol Tapia
- Ángela Lineros as "La Negra"
- Jaime Milla as Dylan
- Gonzalo Araya as Alexis
- Leonardo Bertolini as Pito
- Estrella Ortiz as Victoria "Vicky" Leiva
- Aldo Bernales as Carlos
- Mateo Iribarren as Mayor Toro

=== Guests ===
- Daniel Muñoz as Charles
- Emilio Edwards as "El Turco"
- Alison Mandel as Isidora
- Luz María Yacometti as Albinia
- Ernesto Gutiérrez as Jara
- Pelusa Troncoso as María, abuela de Victoria
- Marcelo Maldonado as Rodrigo Núñez
- Nicolás de Terán as Ronaldo
- Máx Corvalán as José
- Patricia Velasco as Marcela "Chelita" de Maureira
- Cristián Gajardo as Rubén
- Gabriela Arancibia as Maraya
- Rodrigo Lisboa as "El Gato"
- Benjamín Hidalgo as Carlanga
- Rafael Ahumada as Don Pancho
- Ariel Mateluna as Ramiro
- Patricia Pacheco as Maria Alejandra
- Paulina Eguiluz as Luisa
- Gilda Maureira as Doña Humilde
- Macarena Gajardo as Silvia de Mancilla
- Cristián Gajardo as Cabo Cáceres
- Agustín Moya as Nibaldo
- Elvis Fuentes as Nicolás Islas
- Ramón González
- Natalia Aragonese as Leo, madre de Victoria
- Catherine Mazoyer as Periodista 24 Horas
- Eduardo Cumar as Señor Lozano
- Mónica Pérez (cameo)

== Awards and nominations ==
Year	Award	Category	Nominees	Result
2015	Copihue de Oro			
2015	Copihue de Oro	Best TV series or miniseries		Nominated
2015	Copihue de Oro	Best actress	Elisa Zulueta	Nominated
2016	Caleuche Awards			
2016	Caleuche Awards	Best leading actress	Elisa Zulueta	Nominated
2016	Caleuche Awards	Best supporting actor	Nelson Brodt	Nominated
