= Silvia Alessandri =

Chilean politician (1927–2021)

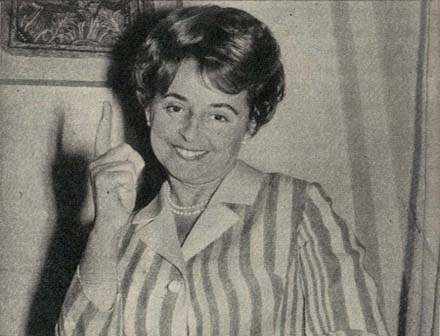

Member of the Chamber of Deputies
- In office 15 May 1969 – 15 May 1973
- Constituency: Santiago, 7th district

Personal details
- Born: 20 May 1927 Santiago, Chile
- Died: 30 June 2021 (aged 94) Santiago, Chile
- Party: National Party
- Spouse: Hernán Calvo Salas
- Parent: Hernán Alessandri
- Occupation: Politician

Silvia Alessandri Montes (20 May 1927 – 30 June 2021) was a Chilean politician. She served as a deputy for Santiago between 1969 and 1973 representing the National Party.

== Early life ==
Alessandri was the daughter of Hernán Alessandri Rodríguez and Sofía Montes Sutil; she was also the niece of former president Jorge Alessandri and the granddaughter of Arturo Alessandri. She completed her secondary studies at the Colegio del Sagrado Corazón. Later, she took nursing courses at the Chilean Red Cross.

== Political career ==
Alessandri started her political activities in the National Party. She was elected deputy for the 7th departmental constituency of Santiago, for the period 1969-1973. She was a member of the Permanent Commission of Public Health, the National Defense Commission, the Mining Commission, that of the Treasury, that of Foreign Relations, that of Work and Social Security and that of Housing and Urbanism. She was a member of the Special Investigative Commission on Complaints Against the National Health Service (SNS) between 1971 and 1972. Alessandri was a member of the Parliamentary Committee of the National Party between 1972 and 1973. In December 1971, she obtained permission from the authorities to carry out the march of the empty saucepans, which led to the emergence of the civic movement called Female Power.

== Personal life and death ==
Alessandri married Hernán Calvo Salas and they had five children. She died in Santiago on 30 June 2021.
