= Allende family =

Chilean political family of Spanish descent

Allende Family
- Chilean political family
- Arms of the Allende family
- Country: Chile
- Origin: Basque Country
- Members: Salvador Allende

The Allende family is a Chilean family of Spanish descent. They became well known during the 19th century and are based in Santiago. They have played a very significant role in Chilean politics.

== Relatives ==
- José Gregorio Allende Garcés, personal bodyguard of Bernardo O'Higgins; married to Salomé Padín Ruiz
  - Ramón Allende Padín (1845–1884), physician and politician, chief of the Chilean Army Medical Corps during the War of the Pacific (1879–1884), author of various important scientific publications, freemason; married to Eugenia Castro del Fierro (1850–1930)
    - Ramón Allende Castro (c. 1870–1910), subsecretary of the Interior, Foreign Relations and Justice (1891).
    - Salvador Allende Castro (1871–1932), journalist, lawyer, freemason, and member of the Radical Party of Chile; married to Laura Gossens Uribe (1877–1962)
      - Inés Allende Gossens (1896–?); married to Eduardo Grove Vallejo (1893–?), dentist, freemason, and brother of Marmaduke Grove Vallejo
      - Salvador Allende Gossens (1908–1973), senator, member of the Socialist Party of Chile, freemason, President of Chile (1970–1973); married to Hortensia Bussi Soto (1914–2009), First Lady of Chile (1970–1973)
        - Beatriz Allende Bussi (1943–1977), revolutionary, daughter of Salvador Allende; married to Luis Fernández Oña (1936–2016), Cuban diplomat
          - Maya Fernández Allende (born 1971), president of the chamber of deputies (2018–2019), Minister of Defense (2022-2026); married to Tomás Monsalve Egaña
          - Alejandro Fernández Allende (born 1973), Cuban homosexual rights activist
        - Isabel Allende Bussi (born 1945), Chilean politician, first woman to serve as president of the Senate
          - Gonzalo Meza Allende (1965–2010), activist for the "No" option in the 1988 plebiscite, founder and member of the Party for Democracy, councilor of La Granja (1992–1996)
          - Marcia Tambutti Allende (born 1971), biologist, writer, director
        - Carmen Allende Bussi (born 1947), teacher, founder of the Salvador Allende Foundation; married to Héctor Sepúlveda Sepúlveda
      - Laura Allende Gossens (1911–1981), politician, sister of Salvador Allende; married to Gastón Pascal Lyon (1909–1993)
        - Denise Pascal Allende (born 1940), politician; married to Jorge Chadwick Vergara (1938–2020)
        - Andrés Pascal Allende (born 1943), revolutionary
    - Tomás Allende Castro (1875–?); married to Laura Pesce Guerra (1869–?)
      - Tomás Allende Pesce (1907–?), diplomatic official; married to Francisca Llona Barros (1920–2018)
        - Juan Allende Llona (born 1942), associate professor of Political Science at Agnes Scott College in Decatur, Georgia
        - Isabel Allende Llona (born 1942), writer
          - Paula Frías Allende (1963–1992), humanitarian activist; married to Ernesto Díaz
          - Nicolás Frías Allende (born 1966) literary editor; married to Lori Barra.
    - Guillermo Allende Castro (1881–?); godfather of Salvador Allende Gossens

== Other notable members ==
- Verónica Pascal Ureta (1953 – 2000), child psychologist, paternal cousin of Andrés Pascal Allende
  - Javiera Balmaceda (born 1972), producer
  - Pedro Pascal (born 1975), actor
  - Lux Pascal (born 1992), actress and transgender activist
