= Alender =

Alender is a surname. Notable people with the surname include:

- Urmas Alender (1953–1994), Estonian singer and musician
- Yoko Alender (born 1979), Estonian architect, civil servant and politician

== See also ==
- Alende
