= Queen of Coal =

- Theatrical release poster
- Spanish: Miss Carbón
- Directed by: Agustina Macri
- Written by: Erika Halvorsen; Mara Pescio
- Produced by: Merry Colomer; María Soler
- Starring: Lux Pascal; Laura Grandinetti; Romina Escobar; Simone Mercado; Federico Marzullo; Gabriela Pastor; Agostina Innella; José Román; Paco León
- Cinematography: Luciano Badaracco
- Edited by: Carla de Beauvoir
- Music by: Maite Arroitajauregi Aranburu
- Production companies: Morena Films; The Warning of Rivard AIE; Pensa & Rocca Cine
- Distributed by: Caramel Films (Spain); Moving Pics (Argentina)
- Release dates: 12 June 2025 (Spain); 2 October 2025 (Argentina)
- Countries: Spain; Argentina
- Language: Spanish

Queen of Coal (Spanish: Miss Carbón) is a 2025 biographical drama film directed by Agustina Macri and written by Erika Halvorsen and Mara Pescio based on the life of Carlita Rodríguez. It stars Lux Pascal. It is a Spanish-Argentine co-production.

== Plot ==
The plot follows the story of Carla Antonella "Carlita" Rodríguez, a trans woman and the first trans miner in the Patagonia, an occupation vetoed for women.

== Cast ==
- Lux Pascal as Carla Antonella Rodríguez "Carlita"
- Paco León
- Laura Grandinetti
- Romina Escobar
- Simone Mercardo
- Federico Marzullo
- Gabriela Pastor
- Agostina Innella
- Lautaro Zera
- Bruno Pablo Zito

== Production ==
The film is a Spanish-Argentine co-production by Morena Films and The Warning of Rivard AIE alongside Pensa & Rocca Cine with the participation of Movistar Plus+ and Filmin. Shooting locations included the Basque Country (Álava and Biscay) and the Argentine Patagonia.

== Release ==
The film was released theatrically in Spain on 12 June 2025 by Caramel Films. It was released theatrically in Argentina on 2 October 2025 by Moving Pics.

The film competed in the 'Progressive Cinema Competition - Visions for the World of Tomorrow' section of the 20th Rome Film Festival in October 2025.

== Reception ==
Beatriz Martínez of Fotogramas rated the film 4 out of 5 stars, deeming it to be "an ode to resilience" enhanced by Pascal's work, otherwise citing Paco León's character as the worst thing about the film.

== Accolades ==
Year	Award	Category	Nominee(s)	Result	Ref.
2026	37th GLAAD Media Awards	Outstanding Film – Streaming or TV		Won	

== See also ==
- List of Spanish films of 2025
- List of Argentine films of 2025
