= Allender =

Allender is a surname. Notable people with the surname include:

- Bruce M. Allender, a phycologist with the standard author abbreviation "Allender"
- Eric Allender (born 1956), American computer scientist
- Henry Allender (1872–1939), Australian rules footballer
- Nina E. Allender (1873–1957), American artist and activist
- Paul Allender (born 1970), English guitarist
- Stephen Allender (born 1960), Australian rules footballer
