= Beatriz Allende =

Chilean politician (1942–1977)

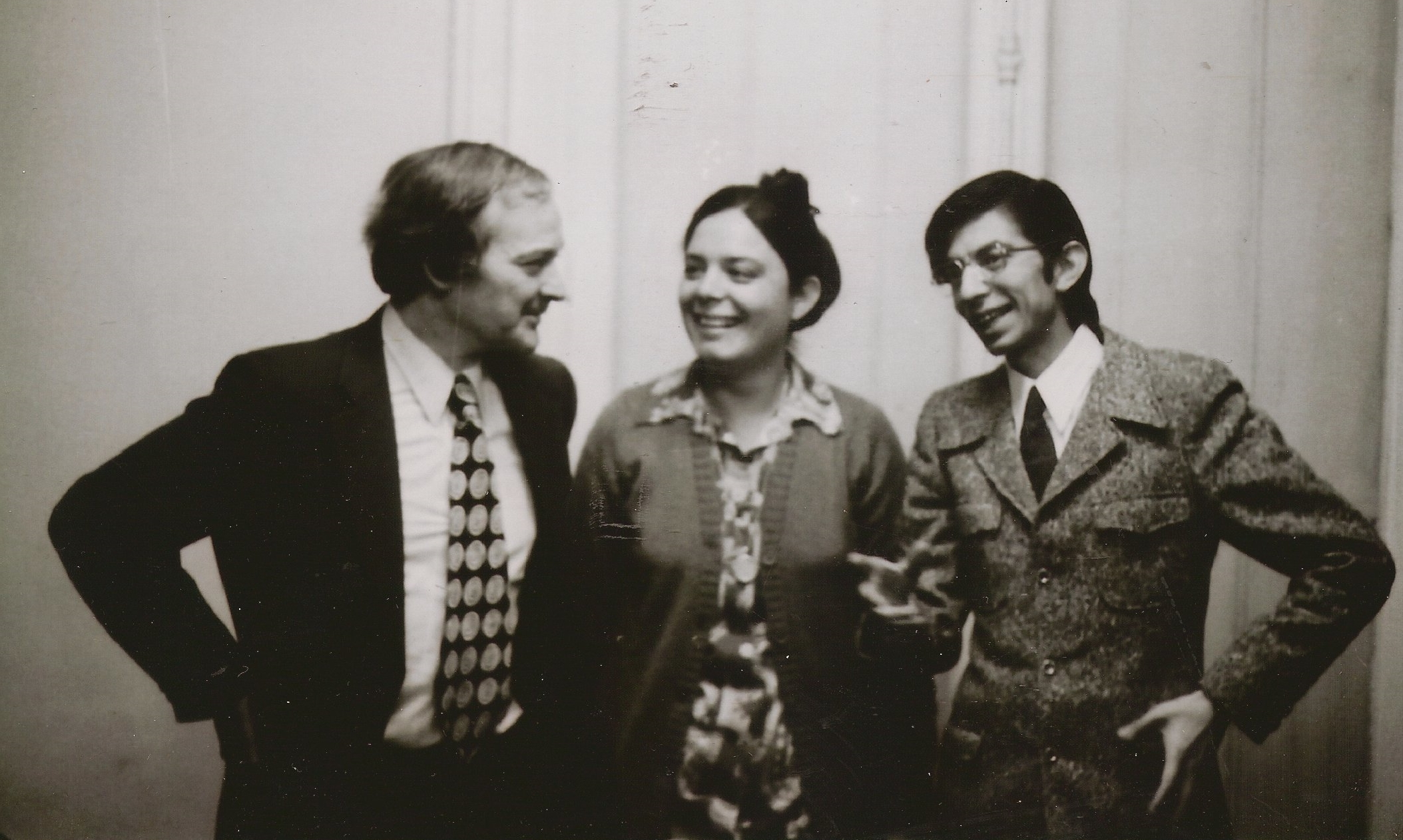
- Allende (centre) in 1973
- Born: Beatriz Patricia Ximena Allende Bussi; 8 September 1942; Santiago, Chile
- Died: 11 October 1977 (aged 35); Havana, Cuba
- Cause of death: Suicide by gunshot
- Education: University of Concepción; University of Chile
- Occupations: Politician, surgeon; Chilean resistance fighter
- Political party: Socialist Party of Chile
- Spouses: Renato Julio (m. 1967; div. 1967) Luis Fernández Oña (m. 1970)
- Children: 2, including Maya Fernández
- Parents: Salvador Allende (father); Hortensia Bussi (mother)
- Family: Allende

Beatriz Allende (US: /ɑːˈjɛndeɪ, -di/, UK: /æˈ-, aɪˈɛn-/, Spanish: [be.aˈtɾis aˈʝende]; 8 September 1942 – 11 October 1977), also known as Tati Allende, was a Chilean politician, surgeon, resistance fighter and member of the Solidarity Movement.

== Early life and education ==
Beatriz Patricia Ximena Allende Bussi was born on 8 September 1942 in Santiago, to Hortensia Bussi, a teacher, and Salvador Allende, a politician, physician and future president of Chile. Beatriz had one older sister, Carmen Paz, and one younger sister, the politician Isabel Allende.

Beatriz studied medicine at the University of Concepción from 1960 to 1962. She then transferred to the University of Chile to complete the remaining years of her training. She graduated as a doctor in May 1967 and took a job at the Consultorio Ismael Valdés, a medical center focused on women's and children's health.

As a Chilean university student, Beatriz became involved in leftist politics, joining the Brigada Universitaria Socialista (BUS). Through this group, she met Renato Julio. They started dating in 1964, and would eventually wed on 6 July 1967, but by then there were rifts in their relationship. The marriage only lasted a few months.

During the 1960s, Beatriz traveled several times to Cuba. She received military training there, where she came in contact with Che Guevara. According to biographer Margarita Espuña, when Beatriz met Guevara, he asked her, "'So you are the daughter of Dr. Allende?' To which she answered sharply: 'I am Beatriz Allende.' And Che Guevara smiled." In 1968, she joined the "elenos" of the National Liberation Army (ELN) who wanted to follow in the footsteps of Guevara.

On one of her trips to Cuba, Beatriz met Luis Fernández Oña (also known as Rodolfo Gallart Grau), a Cuban intelligence official and diplomat. They married in September 1970.

== Aiding her father ==
When her father was elected as the president of Chile on 4 September 1970, Beatriz became his closest advisor and collaborator, networking with elements of the Chilean and international Left. She attempted throughout his presidency to keep the Chilean left from weakening in its support of him.

== Flight from Chile ==
During Pinochet's coup on 11 September 1973, Beatriz stayed with her father in La Moneda Presidential Palace, leaving only when President Allende ordered all women and children to evacuate. She was forced into exile with her mother, sisters, husband, and daughter Maya Alejandra Fernández Allende to Cuba. Beatriz was seven months pregnant at the time with her second child, Alejandro Salvador Allende Fernández.

== Exile in Cuba ==
While in exile, Beatriz served as executive secretary of an anti-imperialist solidarity committee: the Comité Chileno de Solidaridad Antiimperialista, in La Habana. This position required her to travel extensively to raise awareness about conditions in Chile after the coup. She also managed a global solidarity fund and distributed the proceeds to Chile's left-wing parties.

In 1977, she separated from Luis. In one of her last remembered conversations from that year, she spoke of "wanting to escape her role as 'Allende's daughter' — not because she didn't love and admire him, but because his status on the Left and in Cuba prohibited her from living a 'normal' life, out of the spotlight."

== Death ==
Four years and one month after her father died in the 1973 Chilean coup, Beatriz Allende died by suicide with a firearm on 11 October 1977. The gun used was an Uzi gifted to her by Fidel Castro in 1971. She was said to have been "deeply scarred by what had happened in Chile, her father's death, and the dictatorship's ongoing repression of her friends. She was also increasingly pessimistic about Chile's future." Moreover, the prior year's car bombing of Orlando Letelier in Washington, D.C. had been "a devastating blow to the resistance against Pinochet and a personal loss for Beatriz."

She was buried in the Pantheon of Revolutionary Armed Forces in the Colon Cemetery in Havana.

== Posthumous tributes ==
Women members of the Progressive Party of Chile, who call themselves the Tati Allende Progressive Women's Front, held an event to pay tribute to their namesake on 11 October 2018. It was the 41st anniversary of her death. Mónica Berríos composed a commemorative song for the event.

== See also ==
- History of Chile
