= Allende Municipality =

Allende Municipality may refer to:

- Allende Municipality, Chihuahua, Mexico
- Allende Municipality, Coahuila, Mexico
- Allende, Nuevo León, Mexico
