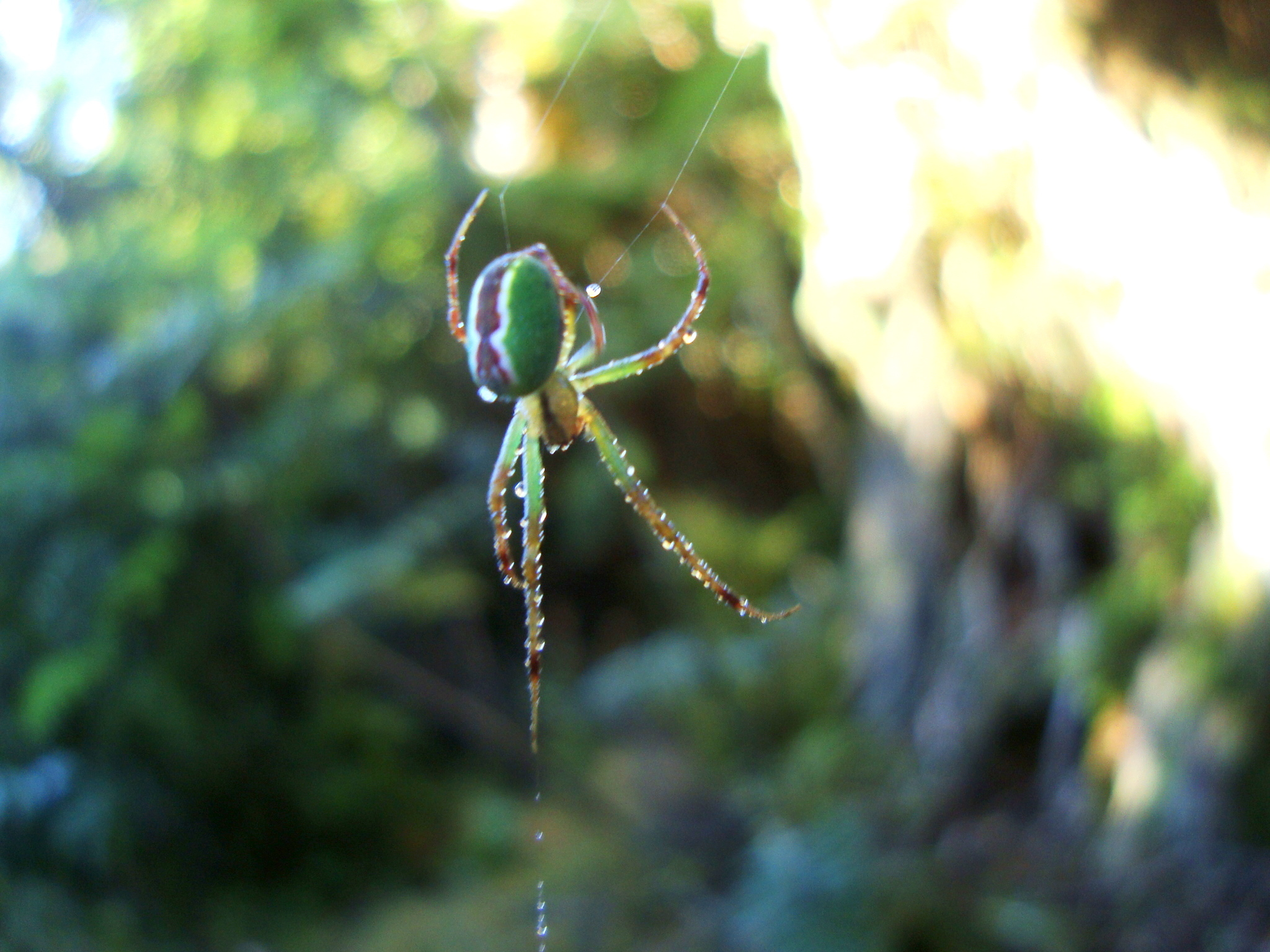

Scientific classification
- Kingdom: Animalia
- Phylum: Arthropoda
- Subphylum: Chelicerata
- Class: Arachnida
- Order: Araneae
- Infraorder: Araneomorphae
- Family: Tetragnathidae
- Genus: Allende; Álvarez-Padilla, 2007

Type species
- A. puyehuensis Álvarez-Padilla, 2007

Species
- 4, see text

= Allende (spider) =

Genus of spiders

Allende is a genus of South American long-jawed orb-weavers that was first described by F. Álvarez-Padilla in 2007. The genus is named for Salvador Allende.

== Species ==
As of October 2019 it contains four species, found in Argentina and Chile:

- Allende longipes (Nicolet, 1849) – Chile, Argentina
- Allende nigrohumeralis (F. O. Pickard-Cambridge, 1899) – Chile (Juan Fernandez Is., mainland), Chile, Argentina
- Allende patagiatus (Simon, 1901) – Chile, Argentina
- Allende puyehuensis Álvarez-Padilla, 2007 (type) – Chile

In synonymy:

- A. aurora (Simon, 1901) = Allende longipes (Nicolet, 1849)
- A. chilensis (Tullgren, 1902) = Allende longipes (Nicolet, 1849)
- A. cordillera (Tullgren, 1902) = Allende longipes (Nicolet, 1849)
- A. echinatus (Tullgren, 1902) = Allende patagiatus (Simon, 1901)
- A. porteri (Simon, 1900) = Allende nigrohumeralis (F. O. Pickard-Cambridge, 1899)
- A. tortus (Tullgren, 1902) = Allende longipes (Nicolet, 1849)
