= Leonor Allende =

Argentine journalist and writer

Leonor Allende (1883-1931) was an Argentine writer and journalist. She was the daughter of Pedro Allende and Delfina Tocaimasa. She has been called the first female journalist of Cordoba, and during her career, she published in newspapers such as La Voz del Interior, La Nación and La Capital de Rosario and in the magazines Caras y Caretas, Plus Ultra, Riel, and Fomento.

She also published several books: Flavio Solari (1907), Don Juan Ramón Zeballos (1912), El libro de los cielos (1943) and El misterio de Ur (1947). Some of her works remained unpublished in her lifetime:La Llama, El libro de los cielos y del sereno amor, El nobilísimo Señor de Ollantaytambo, príncipe de Chimu y su amor, etc.

She was married to the artist Guido Buffo. Their daughter was the poet Eleonora Vendramina.

Leonor Allende died of tuberculosis in 1931. Her daughter died of the same disease 10 years later, in 1941.

Through the efforts of Daniela Mac Auliffe and Karina Rodríguez among others, the novels Flavio Solari, Don Juan Ramón Zeballos and El misterio de Ur have recently been republished.
