= Henry Allender =

Australian rules footballer

Personal information
- Full name: Henry William Allender
- Born: 25 March 1872; Collingwood, Victoria
- Died: 25 April 1939 (aged 67)
- Original team: Collingwood Juniors

Playing career^{1}
Years	Club	Games (Goals)
1899	Carlton	1 (0)
- ^{1} Playing statistics correct to the end of 1899.

Henry William Allender (25 March 1872 – 25 April 1939) was an Australian rules footballer who played with Carlton in the Victorian Football League (VFL).

Allender played his only game for Carton in the first round of the 1899 VFL season against South Melbourne and was mentioned favourably in match reports, but was not selected in the next couple of matches and returned to Collingwood Juniors less than a month later.
