= Palazzo degli Alessandri, Viterbo =

Coordinates: 42.41389°N 12.10562°E

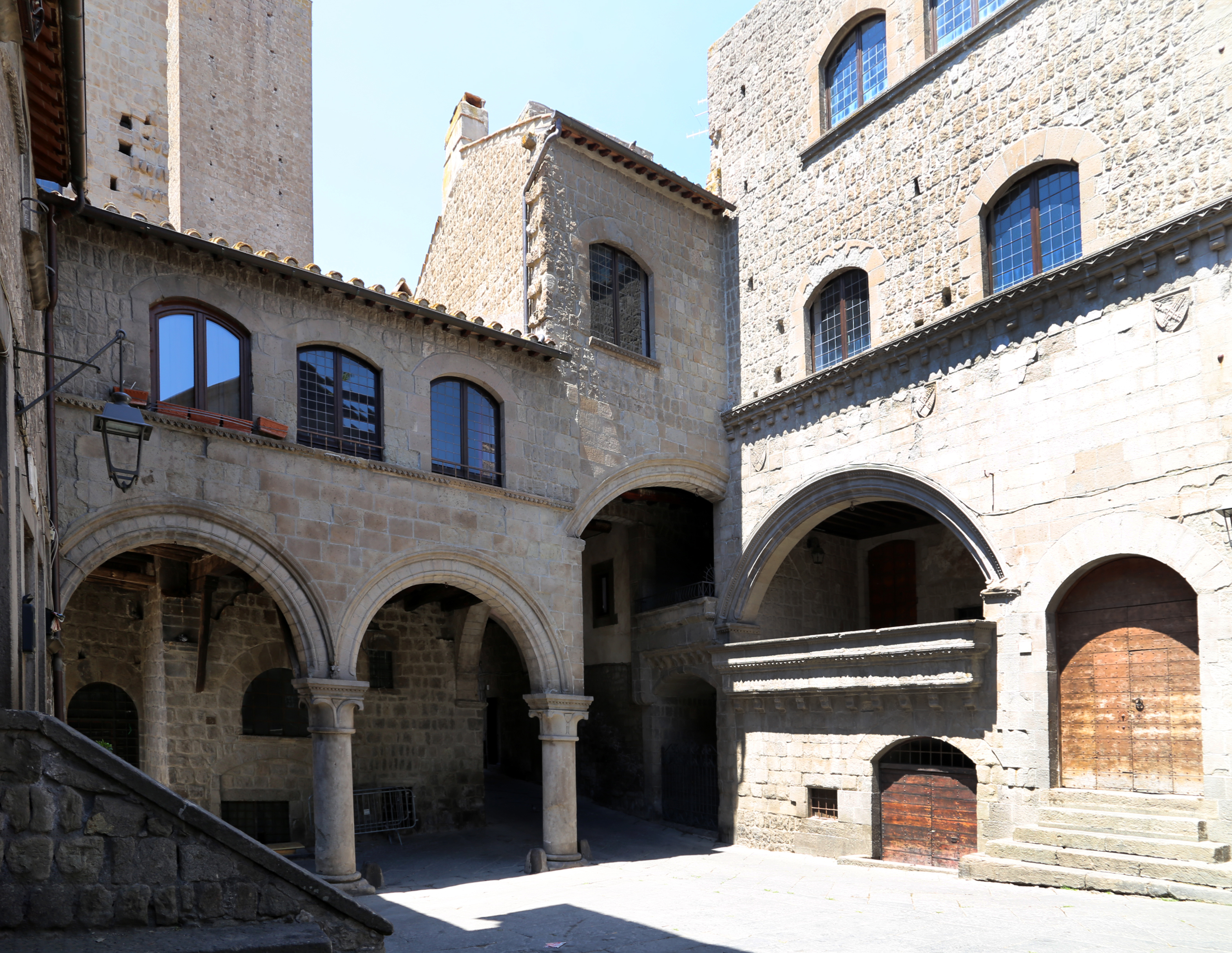
Palazzo degli Alessandri, with large stone balcony (proferrlo) under the wide rounded arch on the right, facing via San Pellegrino that runs below part of the palace

The Palazzo degli Alessandri is a 13th-century palace located in Piazza San Pellegrino number 50 in central Viterbo, region of Lazio, Italy. Across from this Piazza, rises the small Gothic church of San Pellegrino.

== History and description ==
The palace and its towers form a piazza San Pellegrino creating a quaint but somewhat Escher-like urban jumble of arches, passageways, and terraces. Above the balcony but below a cornice are heraldic shields of the Alessandri family, depicting a hatched diagonal Cross of St Andrew. On the western end of the palace rise two tall towers. The palace and its towers escaped destruction when the Allessandri fled the city after siding with the Guelph forces. The palace was spared destruction by Pope Innocent IV. When the Alessandri family died, the palace passed on to the Pollini family. The Palace underwent a number of reconstructions, the latest in the last century.

A Palazzo degli Alessandri found in Florence, region of Tuscany, belongs to a distinct and unrelated family.
