= Hernán Alessandri =

Chilean physician and educator

Hernan Alessandri
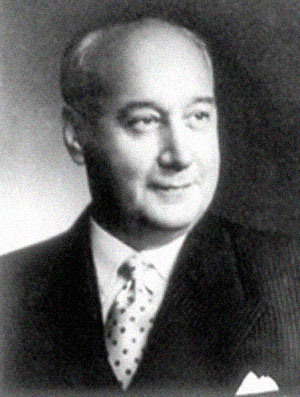
- Born: May 21, 1900; Santiago, Chile
- Died: March 27, 1980 (aged 79); Santiago, Chile

Hernán Alessandri Rodríguez (May 21, 1900 – March 27, 1982), was a renowned Chilean medical educator and the son of Arturo Alessandri, who was president from 1920 to 1925 and again from 1932 to 1938, and brother of Jorge Alessandri Rodríguez, who was president from 1958 to 1962.

== Early life ==
Alessandri was born in Santiago, the son of Arturo Alessandri Palma and Rosa Ester Rodríguez. He completed his early studies at the Instituto Nacional, and later received his medical degree from the Universidad de Chile in 1923.

== Public life ==
When in 1927 his father was sent into exile, he used the opportunity to deepen his medical knowledge in France and Germany. At the University of Chile, he became successively Professor of Clinical Medicine (1932), of Medical Semiology (1937), and Full Professor and Chair of Medicine (1944). At the Hospital del Salvador in Santiago, he worked to innovate the internal medicine of the clinic and in Chilean hospitals.

He was one of the prime movers for the reform of medical teaching in 1943, created the medical residency programs for the training of specialists in 1952, served as Dean of the Faculty of Medicine from 1958 to 1962, and was a founding member of the Chilean Academy of Medicine (1964).

He was the first Latin American to be named Honorary Member of the American College of Physicians (1968) and became Emeritus Professor of the University of Chile in 1973. He died in Santiago, in 1980.

His disciples and friends established in his honor a social and teaching foundation which they named after him.

== See also ==
- Alessandri family
