= Isabel Allende (politician) =

Chilean politician (born 1945)

María Isabel Allende
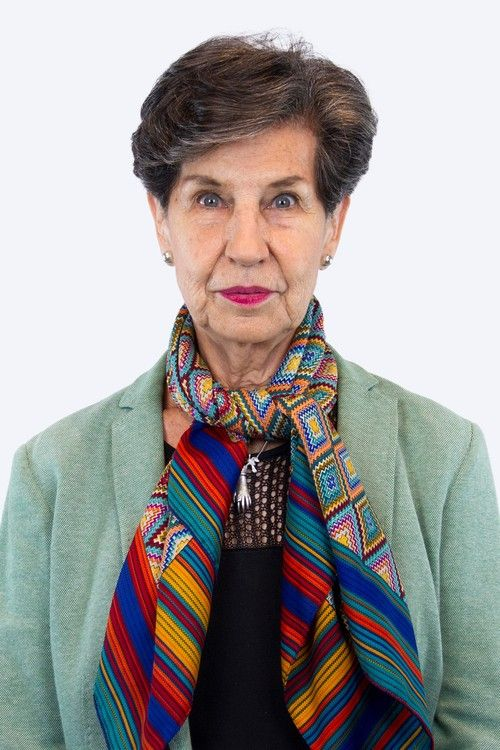
- Allende in 2022

President of the Senate
- In office 11 March 2014 – 11 March 2015
- Preceded by: Jorge Pizarro
- Succeeded by: Patricio Walker

Member of the Senate
- In office 11 March 2018 – 17 April 2025
- Preceded by: Ignacio Walker
- Succeeded by: Tomás de Rementería
- Constituency: Valparaíso Region
- In office 11 March 2010 – 11 March 2018
- Preceded by: Ricardo Núñez Muñoz
- Succeeded by: Yasna Provoste
- Constituency: Atacama

Leader of the Socialist Party of Chile
- In office 17 May 2015 – 9 April 2017
- Preceded by: Osvaldo Andrade
- Succeeded by: Álvaro Elizalde

President of the Chamber of Deputies
- In office 18 March 2003 – 16 March 2004
- Preceded by: Adriana Muñoz
- Succeeded by: Pablo Lorenzini

Member of the Chamber of Deputies
- In office 11 March 1998 – 11 March 2010
- Preceded by: Jaime Estévez
- Succeeded by: Osvaldo Andrade
- Constituency: 29th District
- In office 11 March 1994 – 11 March 1998
- Preceded by: Víctor Manuel Rebolledo
- Succeeded by: Adriana Muñoz
- Constituency: 9th District

Personal details
- Born: 18 January 1945 (age 81) Santiago, Chile
- Party: Socialist Party of Chile
- Children: 2
- Parents: Salvador Allende; Hortensia Bussi
- Relatives: Allende family
- Education: University of Chile
- Profession: Sociologist
- Website: Official website

María Isabel Allende Bussi (US: /ɑːˈjɛndeɪ, -di/, UK: /æˈ-, aɪˈɛn-/, Spanish: [isaˈβel aˈʝende]; born 18 January 1945) is a Chilean politician.

A member of the Socialist Party and the youngest daughter of former president of Chile Salvador Allende and Hortensia Bussi, Allende served as a deputy from 1994 to 2010 and in March 2010 she became a Senator for the Atacama Region. On 28 February 2014, she was selected as president of the Senate, a position previously held by her father in the 1960s, making her the first female president of the Senate in Chilean history.

On 3 April 2025, Chile's Constitutional Court removed Allende from office as a Senator, finding that she had engaged in business transactions incompatible with her office. She forfeited her seat on 9 April, some eleven months before her term was due to expire.

== Biography ==
=== Early life ===
Allende attended the Maisonette College, and unlike her sisters, was initially attracted to the Catholic Church and received her first communion. In 1962, at the age of 17, she began studying sociology, and joined the university's socialist brigade. Five years later she accompanied her father to the congress of the Socialist Party in Chile.

On 11 September 1973, the day of the military coup led by General Augusto Pinochet, Allende was the last person to enter the presidential palace. After the military began to bomb the presidential palace, and the outcome was already clear, her father Salvador Allende ordered the women to leave.

Salvador Allende, the first Marxist president elected in the Americas, and sitting president at the time of the coup, died during the coup led by General Augusto Pinochet in 1973. There is contention as to whether he died by suicide or was killed. The military coup launched a 17-year dictatorship.

=== Exile ===
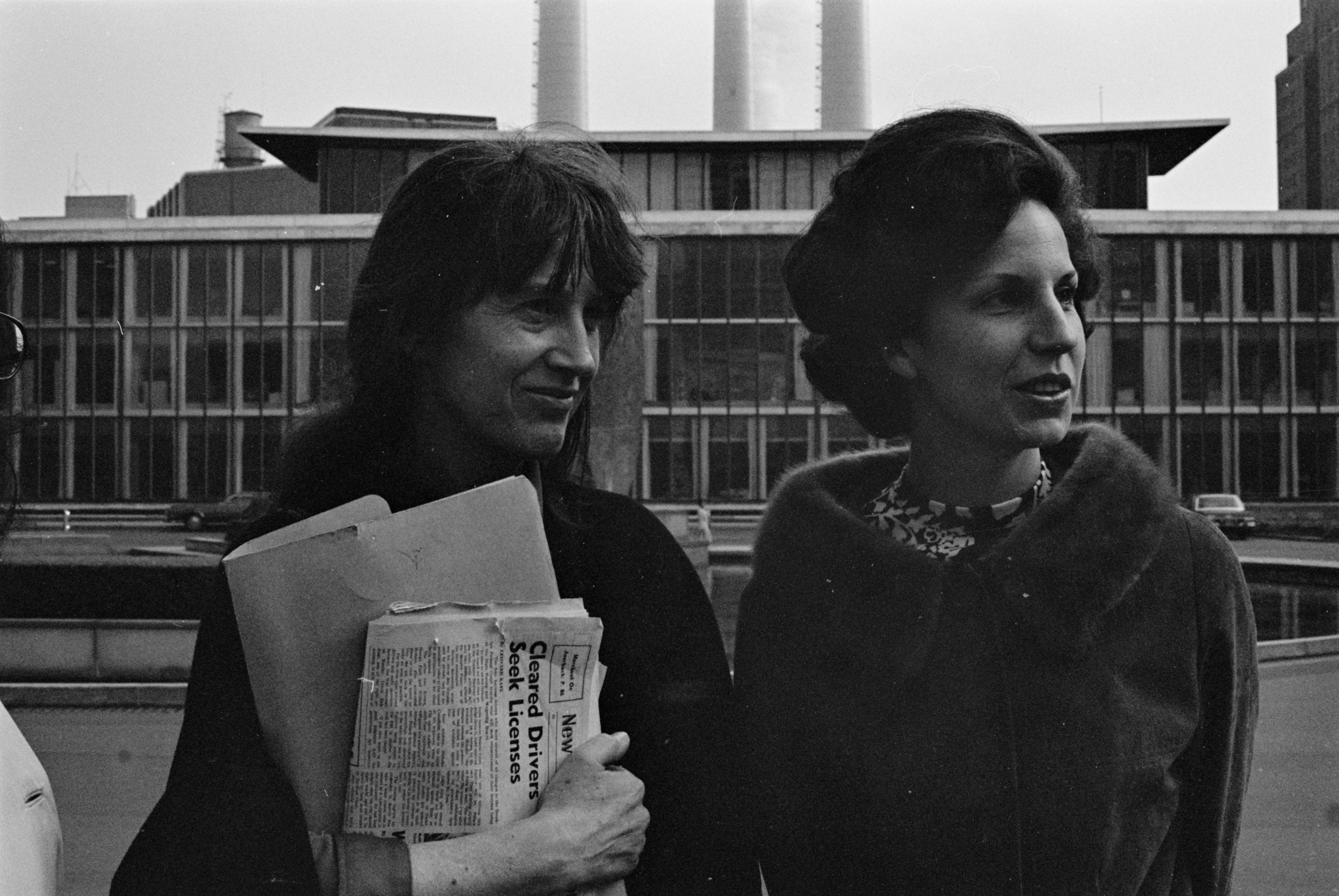
Allende (right) at the United Nations, May 11, 1974

Isabel, together with her mother and her sister Carmen Paz, was granted political asylum in Mexico, a country that fully welcomed them and where she spent 16 years in exile before returning to Chile in 1989, during the final phase of the military regime.

During her exile she traveled around the world denouncing human rights violations, meeting with heads of state and international figures in pursuit of the restoration of democracy in Chile. During her years of exile in Mexico City, she also completed a Master’s degree in Sociology at the National Autonomous University of Mexico (UNAM) and another in Political Science at FLACSO, after which she began working at the Latin American Institute of Transnational Studies (ILET – Mexico).

=== Return to Chile ===
Her first marriage, with Sergio Meza, did not last for long, but they had a son, Gonzalo. Gonzalo (1965-2010) was an activist in the "No" movement leading up to the 1988 plebiscite and a founder of the Party for Democracy. With her second husband, Romilio Tambutti, she has a daughter named Marcia (b. 1971).

Other members of the Allende family have played important roles in Chilean politics. Her niece Maya Fernández, also a member of the Socialist Party, was named Minister of Defence under President Gabriel Boric in March 2022. Gay rights activist Alejandro Fernández Allende is her nephew.

== Political career ==
On returning to her homeland, Allende began a successful political career as a member of the Socialist Party of Chile. After Chile's return to democracy in 1990, she was elected to the Chamber of Deputies, serving as its President between 2003 and 2004, becoming the second woman to do so after Adriana Muñoz.

Allende, along with Soledad Alvear and several other Senators, sponsored a bill to extend voting rights to Chileans living abroad. The right to vote from overseas was codified by Law No. 20.748, which allowed thousands of Chileans to vote in the 2020 national plebiscite and in presidential elections.

Among her principal successes, Allende has worked to reform Chile's divorce law; a law that allows disabled individuals to be judges and notaries; and a law permitting abortion on three grounds. She has also worked for the passage of bills on gender identity, the water code, and creation of a government service for biodiversity and environmental protection. She supports adhering to the Trans-Pacific partnership.

On 3 April 2025, Chile's Constitutional Court found, in an 8-2 ruling, that Allende had engaged in business activities incompatible with Article 60 of the Constitution, and declared her Senate seat vacant. It found her guilty of attempting to sell a house, which had belonged to her late father, to the government as a museum. This was found to be a conflict of interest, as people holding political office are prohibited by Article 60 from entering into state contract negotiations. Her niece, Maya Fernández Allende, was also forced to resign from her position in the Cabinet of President Gabriel Boric.

== See also ==
- Allende family
- Pinochet dictatorship
- History of Chile
