= Palazzo degli Alessandri, Florence =

Coordinates: 43°46′17.23″N 11°15′38.27″E

Palazzo degli Alessandri
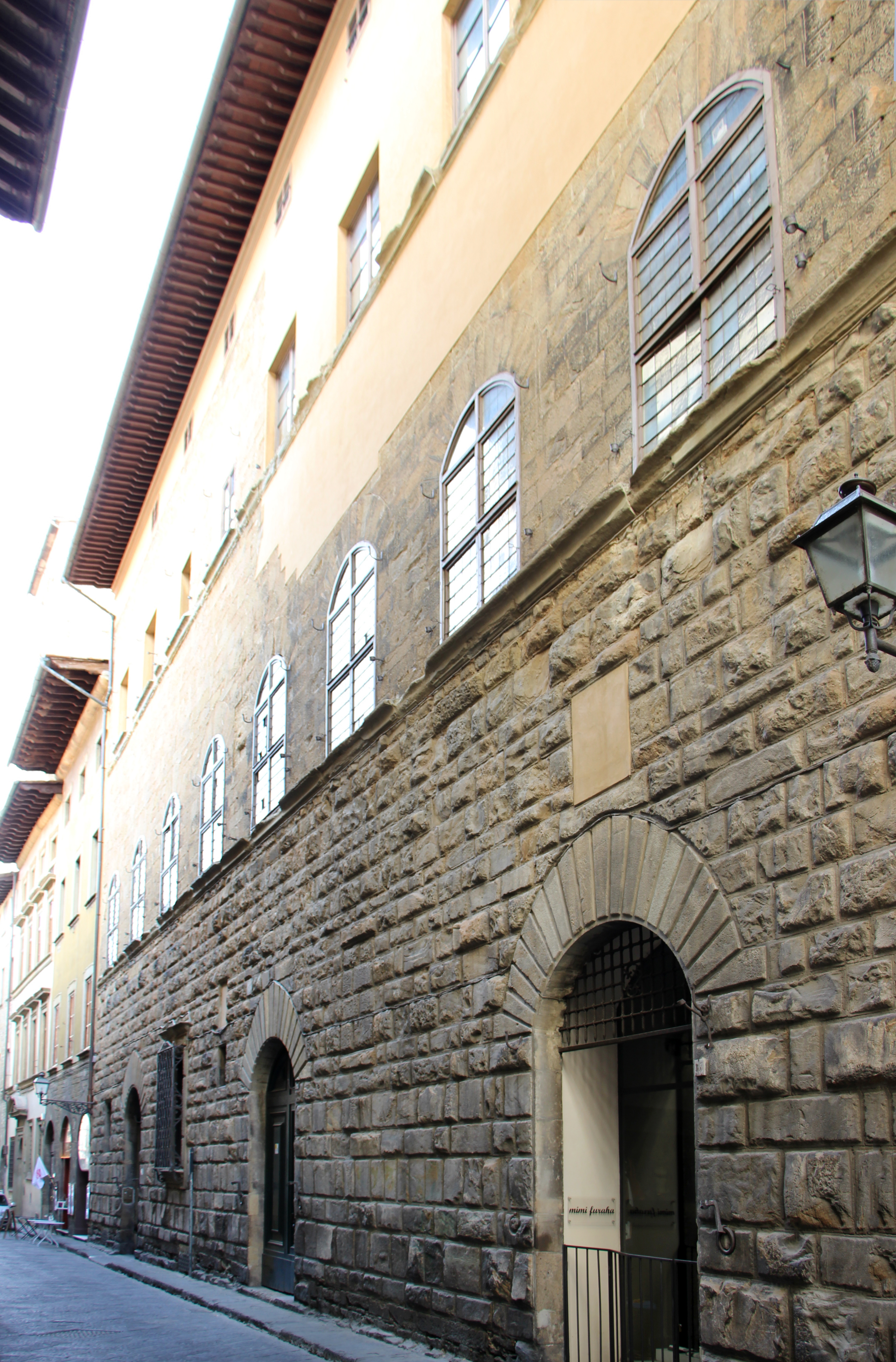

General information
- Architectural style: Early-Renaissance
- Location: Borgo degli Albizi number 15, Florence
- Completed: c. 1376

Renovating team
- Architect: Restoration by Giuseppe Poggi

The Palazzo degli Alessandri is an early-Renaissance-style palace located on Borgo degli Albizi number 15 in Florence, Region of Tuscany, Italy. The Alessandri family derived from a branch of the Albizzi family; documents for the foundation of this branch date from 1372.

The two brother Alessandro and Bartolomeo degli Albizi (after 1372 called 'degli Alessandri') built the palace after the purchasing of three lots between 1368-72 and probably completed by 1376. During the Ciompi rebellion of 1378 the palace was ransacked and arson, the west side of the structure collapsed (the lack of rustication is still visible today). The Alessandri (and Albizzi) had been prominent Guelph families linked to the wool production, and thus the Guild of Wool. The coat of arms of the Alessandri was a two heads lamb on a blue field with a gold crown and palm leaves. The family produced twenty-three Priors and nine Gonfaloniers. The palace was enlarged in the 1700s by Cosimo Alessandri. The palace was restored in the 19th century by Giuseppe Poggi. Antonio Canova was patronized by the Alessandri family. The Palace is still owned by descendants of the Alessandri.
