= Maya Fernández =

Chilean politician

Maya Fernández Allende
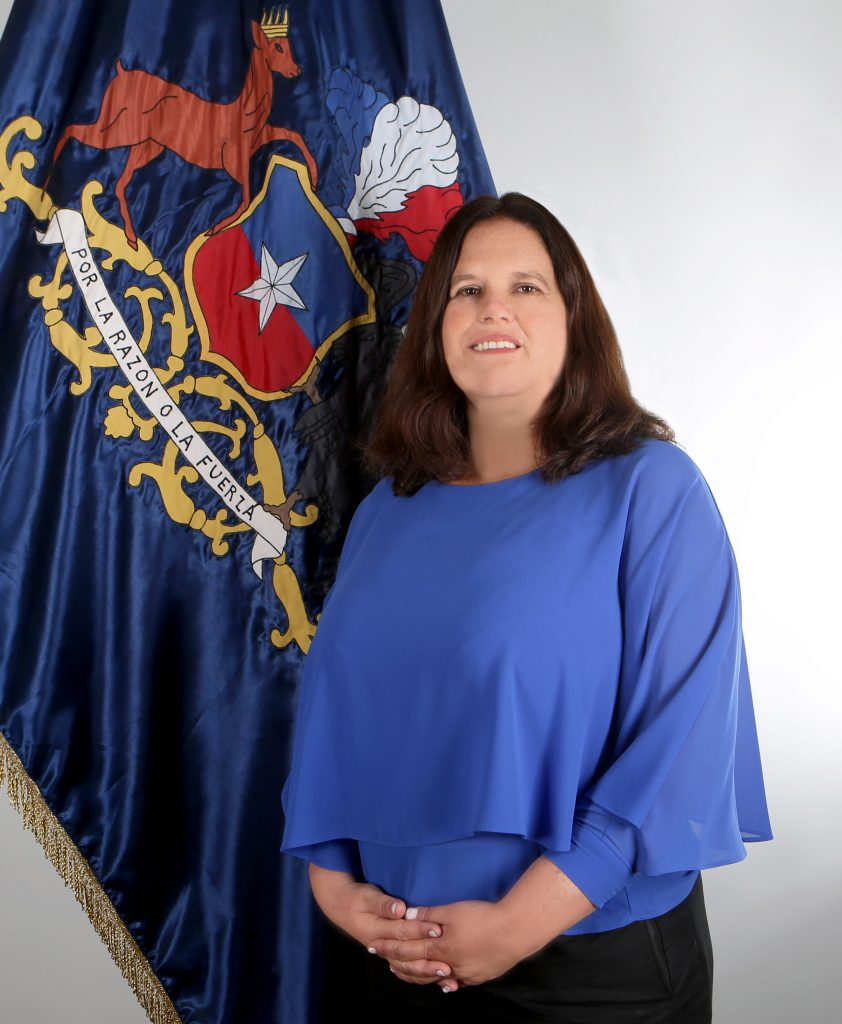

Minister of National Defense of Chile
- In office 11 March 2022 – 10 March 2025
- President: Gabriel Boric
- Preceded by: Baldo Prokurica
- Succeeded by: Adriana Delpiano

President of the Chamber of Deputies
- In office 11 March 2018 – 19 March 2019
- Preceded by: Fidel Espinoza
- Succeeded by: Iván Flores

Member of the Chamber of Deputies
- In office 2014–2022

Personal details
- Born: 27 September 1971 (age 55) Santiago, Chile
- Party: Socialist Party of Chile
- Education: University of Chile
- Occupation: Biologist

Maya Alejandra Fernández Allende (born 27 September 1971) is a Chilean biologist, veterinarian, politician, and a member of the Socialist Party of Chile (PS) who served as Minister of National Defense of Chile between 2022 and 2025. She has served as a deputy of the Republic, representing the 10th district, Metropolitan Region, since March 2018. In her first legislative year, she presided over the Chamber of Deputies between March 2018 and March 2019. From 2022 to 2025, she served as Minister of Defence in the Cabinet of President Gabriel Boric.

== Early life and education ==
Born in Chile to Cuban diplomat Luis Fernández Oña and Beatriz Allende Bussi, she is a grandchild of the Chilean President Salvador Allende. She and her family had to emigrate to Cuba due to the military coup of 11 September 1973 against her grandfather, staying on the island until she was 21 years old. She returned to Chile in 1990, settling permanently in 1992. The same year she began studying biology at the University of Chile. She subsequently also studied veterinary medicine at the same university and obtained a BSc in both.

== Political career ==
In 1992 she joined the Socialist Party of Chile. In the 2008 municipal elections, she was elected councilor for the Nuñoa commune, which she stayed until 2012. During the presidency of Michelle Bachelet between 2006 and 2012, she worked in the Ministry of Foreign Relations. In the municipal elections of 2012, she ran for the mayorship of Ñuñoa for the Socialist Party on the Concertation list. The favorite to win the elections was Pedro Sabat, who had been serving as mayor of Nuñoa for the past 16 years. Fernandez at first won the elections by a slim margin of twenty votes, a result which was appealed by Sabat, who in turn came out victorious after a recount which gave him a thirty-vote lead.

=== Member of Parliament ===
In the 2013 parliamentary elections, Fernández ran for the position of deputy for the 21st district, which includes the communes Nuñoa and Providencia from the metropolitan communes of Santiago. From 11 March 2014 to 11 March 2018, she represented the 21st district for the PS in the Chamber of Deputies. In the 2017 parliamentary elections, she was re-elected deputy, this time for the newly created District 10 of the Metropolitan Region. On the 11 March 2018, she became president of the Chamber of Deputies. She left office in March 2019.

=== Minister of Defense ===
From March 2022 to March 2025, Fernández served as the Minister of Defense in the Cabinet of Gabriel Boric. Referring to the military coup in which her grandfather and former President of Chile was killed, she saw the role of the Chilean Military to defend Chile as a country and not to get involved in internal security.

In January 2025, she accompanied Gabriel Boric on his journey to the Amundsen-Scott South Pole Station. It was the first trip by a sitting president of Latin America to the South Pole.

Fernández resigned from the Cabinet on 10 March 2025 amid controversy over the attempted sale of a property that had belonged to her late grandfather, President Salvador Allende, to the government for use as a museum. She was accused by political opponents of violating the Constitution. "She committed a serious offense against the Constitution and the laws. No minister of state can enter into contracts with the state and the minister did so," Congresswoman Camila Flores, of right-wing Chile Vamos, told a press conference. In a related development three weeks later, on 3 April, the Constitutional Court ordered Fernández's aunt, Isabel Allende Bussi, to forfeit her seat in the Senate for having violated Article 60 of the Constitution, which prohibits office-holders from engaging in state contract negotiations. Fernández and Allende, along with other descendants of Salvador Allende, are joint owners of his residence at 392 Guardia Vieja Street in the Santiago suburb of Providencia.

== Personal life ==
She is the daughter of Cuban diplomat and politician of the Cuban Communist Party Luis Fernández Oña and surgeon Beatriz Allende Bussi, and the youngest granddaughter of former President Salvador Allende. She is also a niece to Senator Isabel Allende. Being a volunteer firefighter of Nuñoa, she is married to Tomás Monsalve Egaña and has two children.
