= Andrés Pascal Allende =

Chilean Marxist dissident

Secretary General to Movement of the Revolutionary Left (MIR)
- In office 1974–1986
- Preceded by: Miguel Enríquez
- Succeeded by: Movement partially dissolved

Personal details
- Born: Andrés Eduardo Pascal Allende; 12 June 1943 Valparaíso, Chile
- Party: Movement of the Revolutionary Left
- Spouses: Carmen Castillo (m. 1966, divorced) Mary Ann Beausire Alonso (divorced): Olga Ofelia Sánchez Machado
- Children: 4 – 5
- Parent: Laura Allende (mother)
- Relatives: Allende family; Salvador Allende (Uncle); Denise Pascal (Sister); William Beausire (ex-brother-in-law); Mónica Echeverría (ex-mother-in-law); Fernando Castillo Velasco (ex-father-in-law)
- Education: Pontifical Catholic University of Chile; University of Chile (didn't graduate)

Andrés Pascal Allende (born 12 July 1943 in Valparaíso, Chile) is a Chilean sociologist and member of the Allende family, known for being the former Secretary General to the Movement of the Revolutionary Left and a prominent member of the Chilean Resistance and Solidarity Movement.

== Early life and education ==
Pascal was born on 12 July 1943 in Valparaíso, to Gastón Pascal Lyon and Laura Allende. Pascal has 3 older siblings, Pedro Gastón, Marianne and Denise Pascal, a politician for the Socialist Party of Chile. He is of Basque and Belgian descent.

Pascal was educated at the Grange School and Saint George's College. Continuing his education, Pascal studied sociology at the Pontifical Catholic University of Chile. Pascal also studied history at the University of Chile but didn't graduate.

In 1966, Allende married Carmen Castillo, a French-Chilean filmmaker and member of the Movement of the Revolutionary Left (MIR). The couple had one daughter, Camila Pascal Castillo, before later divorcing.

== MIR and exile ==
Pascal is the former leader of the Movement of the Revolutionary Left (MIR) along with Miguel Enríquez. After the Chilean coup of 1973, and upon original leader Miguel Enriquez's death in 1974, Andrés Pascal Allende took control of the MIR. In 1976, fled Chile and settled in Cuba.

In March 1976, Orlando Bosch was arrested by Costa Rican police on suspicion of trying to assassinate Pascal and his companion Mary-Anne Beausire. In 1978, Pascal's 4 year old son Pablo died from fulminant bacterial meningitis.

In 1986, Pascal ceased to be the Secretary General of the Movement of the Revolutionary Left.

== Return to Chile ==
Pascal returned to Chile in 2002, and served as the director of planning and development at the University of Art & Social Sciences.

== Publications ==
- Pascal Allende, Andrés (1968). Relaciones de poder en una localidad rural (Estudio de caso en el Valle Hurtado, Coquimbo) (1 ed.). Santiago: ICIRA.
- Pascal Allende, Andrés (2003). El MIR chileno : una experiencia revolucionaria. Argentina: Ediciones Cucaña.
- Pascal Allende, Andrés; Vidaurrázaga Aránguiz, Tamara (2011). Baer, Willi; Dellwo, Karl-Heinz; Castillo, Carmen (eds.). MIR : Die revolutionäre linke Chiles (in German). Hamburg: Laika-Verlag. ISBN 978-3942281805.
