= Solidarity Movement with Chile =

The Chile Solidarity Movement supported the election of Salvador Allende, president of Chile from 1970 to 1973. When a military coup ousted Allende from power in 1973, the Movement sought to end the dictatorship.

== Support for Allende ==
American Leftist groups supported the democratic efforts to elect the Socialist Salvador Allende and showed continued support him during his presidency. In 1972, Eric Leenson, returned from a Fulbright in Chile, helped establish Non-Intervention in Chile (NICH). The group stood in solidarity with Allende supporters within Chile and sent out newsletters from their Berkeley office to inform solidarity groups across the United States.

== Opposition to the Pinochet Dictatorship: 1973-1990 ==
The Socialist Allende government of Chile fell to a U.S.-involved military coup d'état on September 11, 1973. The Pinochet regime targeted and forced the disappearance of political opposition. At least 200,000 people left Chile as exiles and settled, in highest numbers, in Europe and North America. In exile, the Chilean left established an "external front" to fight the dictatorship. They joined with allies and created a culturally vibrant and politically diverse solidarity movement with the Chilean Left. U.S. solidarity groups operated in New York, Berkeley, CA, Washington, D.C., and elsewhere. Movement groups operated out of Amsterdam, London, and other European cities.

=== Radio ===
Movement participants used this non-mainstream media in many of the same ways that contemporary movements use social media, because media in Chile during the dictatorship was severely controlled by the Pinochet regime. Rosalind Bresnahan writes, "In the early hours of the coup, radio had the greatest potential for organizing resistance. Not surprisingly, one of the junta's first acts was the order the pro-UP stations to ease transmissions or face aerial bombardment." The Pinochet regime expropriated 40 stations, and most were linked to form Radio Nacional. In 1980, Pinochet enacted Article 6(b) in Chile's State Security Law. The law granted discretionary power to the regime to control media and restrict free speech. It became illegal to "publicly slander, libel, or offend the president of the Republic or any other high-level government, military, and police officials." The threat to free speech restricted the oppositional movement to Pinochet within Chile, and affected the solidarity movement's access to information within Chile.

Short wave radio helped to spread information in the international arena. Radio Moscow produced daily segments about Chile, "mostly speeches and commentaries because [they] didn't have much information." They also reported on friends' and families' testimonies from within Chile. From 1974 to 1975 Radio Moscow read letters that arrived most often indirectly from Chile to Moscow that denounced cases of human rights violations. Radio programming in solidarity with Chile also came from Radio Prague, Havana, and Berlin.

=== Newsletters ===
To communicate between the local groups, several solidarity organizations produced and distributed newsletters. The North American Congress on Latin America (NACLA) spread information and calls to action in their magazine Report on the Americas, consistently during the Dictatorship. Of any other U.S. journal, NACLA served as the greatest source of information about Chile for people in the U.S.

== The arts ==
Political art played a central role in the movement. Activists used concerts, poster art, and arpilleras to promote Chilean culture, denounce the dictatorship, and support the movement. At Glide Church in San Francisco, activists presented a Salvador Allende Memorial Poetry Reading. The event took place on October 4, 1973, just one month after the coup.

In Berkeley, CA in June 1975, Chilean exiles and movement activists joined to create La Peña Cultural Center. Traditionally, a Peña is a Chilean meeting place for socially conscious conversation and culture. Here, the Bay Area movement held meetings, concerts, and housed their movement office. The musicians of Grupo Raíz met at La Peña, and performed around the world to educate about Latin American social struggles. The Nueva Canción group's members included Rafael Manriquez, Quique Cruz, Fernando "Feña" Torres, Hector Salgado, and Elizabeth Lichi Fuentes. In 1982, the group sang with Pete Seeger for a movement solidarity concert at the Berkeley Community Theatre.

== La Esmeralda Protest ==
La Esmeralda is a Chilean Naval ship known to be a site of torture and detention during the dictatorship. It was docked in the port of Valparaiso, Chile then sent to tour around the world. On Friday morning, June 21, 1974, La Esmeralda was set to dock at the Oakland Naval Supply Depot. Movement activists attempted to block the dock, and hung a "Junta No" banner from the Golden Gate Bridge in protest. In solidarity, the International Longshore and Warehouse Union obstructed the ship from entering the harbor.
