= Irací Hassler =

Chilean politician and economist (born 1990)

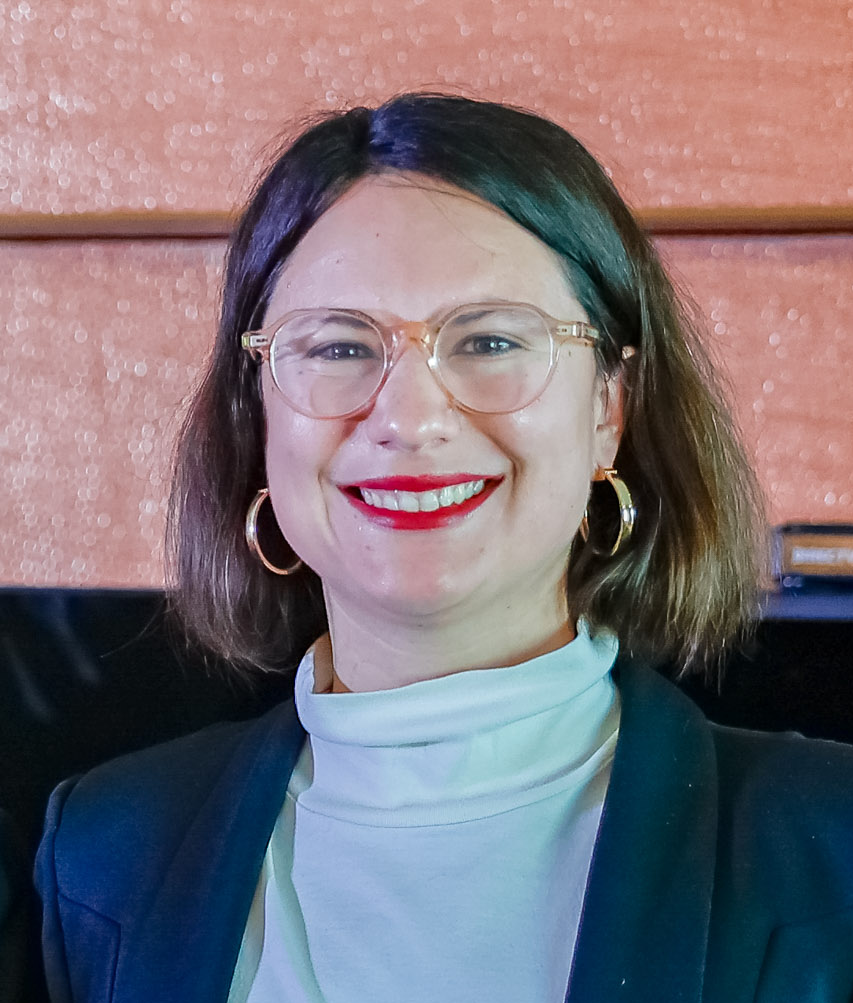
- Hassler in August 2024

Member of the Chamber of Deputies
- Incumbent
- Assumed office 11 March 2026

Mayor of Santiago
- In office 28 June 2021 – 15 November 2024
- Preceded by: Felipe Alessandri
- Succeeded by: Mario Desbordes

Santiago municipal councillor
- In office 2016–2021

Personal details
- Born: Irací Luiza Hassler Jacob; 6 November 1990 (age 35) Santiago, Chile
- Party: Communist Party of Chile
- Education: University of Chile

Irací Luiza Hassler Jacob (born 6 November 1990) is a Chilean politician and economist who served as mayor of the commune of Santiago, which encompasses central Santiago, from 2021 to 2024. A member of the Communist Party of Chile (PCCh), she has been described as "the new face of feminism and environmentalism" in Chile.

== Early life and education ==
Hassler was born in November 1990 in Santiago to a Brazilian mother of Tupi-Guarani and French-Jewish descent and a Chilean father of Swiss descent. Her father, Rolf Hassler, made a living as a fruit businessman in Olmué, Valparaíso Region, and is a conservative. Hassler's mother is said to be a supporter of centre-left politics and is from a family that originates northeastern Brazilian state of Piauí. Hassler has stated that her given name, Irací, is of indigenous Tupi-Guarani origin and means "queen of the bees". In addition to Spanish, Hassler is fluent in her mother's native tongue of Portuguese as well as German.

Hassler studied at the Swiss School in Santiago (German: Schweizer Schule Santiago), a Swiss international school in Ñuñoa, Santiago. Hassler would later attend the University of Chile, where she studied economics and administration and was a member of the University Senate from 2012 to 2014. After graduation, Hassler would work as a professional economist.

== Political career ==
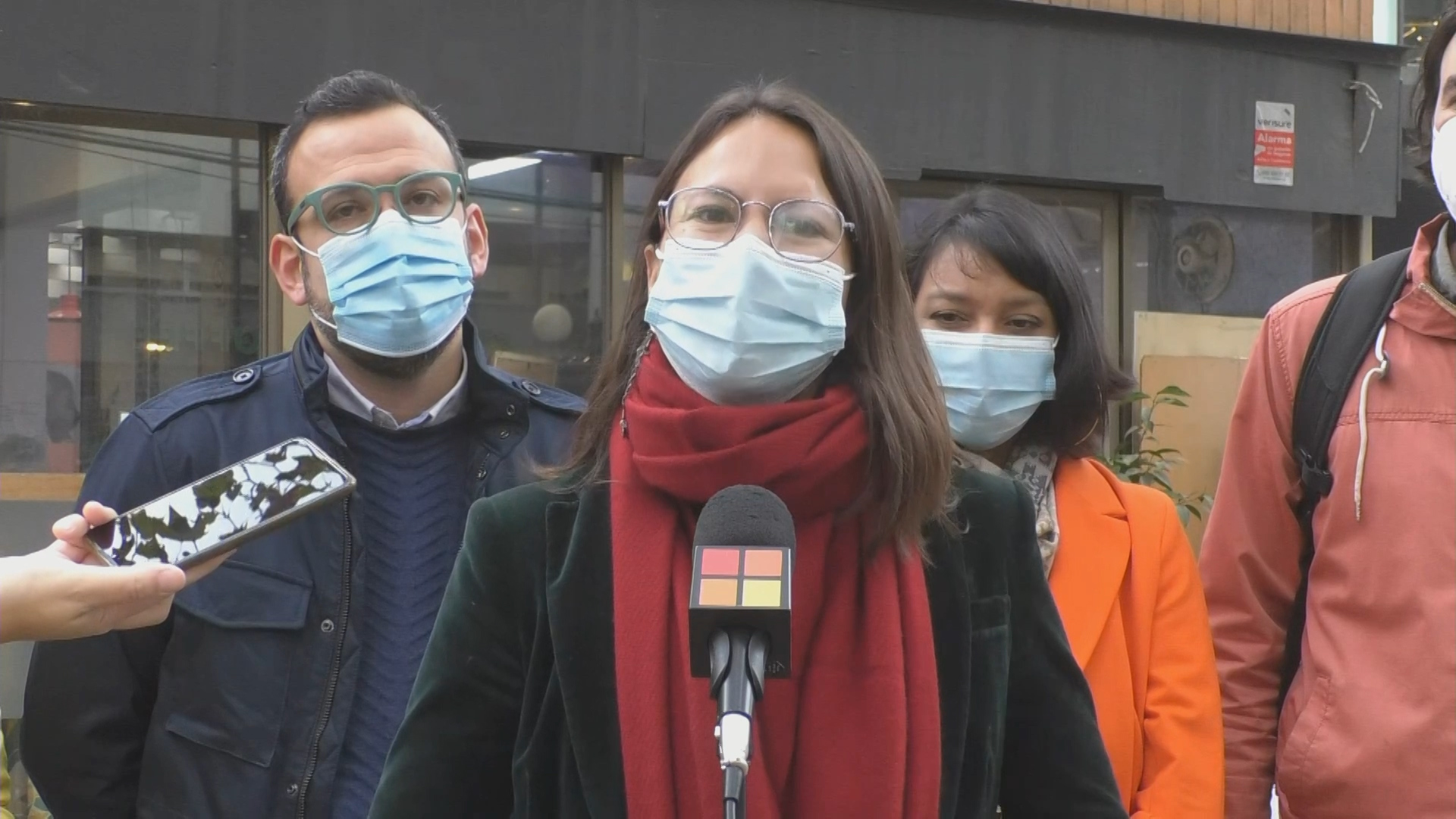
Hassler campaigning in the 2021 mayoral election

During the 2011 Chilean student protests, Hassler joined Communist Youth of Chile (La Jota). Hassler was also involved in the leadership of the University of Chile Student Federation (FECh). Hassler would formally become a member of the Communist Party (PCCh) in 2018. In 2016, Hassler was elected as a municipal councillor in Santiago for a term ending in 2020. Hassler's term in office was extended until 2021 due to the COVID-19 pandemic.

In December 2020, Hassler won the primary election to determine the opposition's candidate to the office of Mayor of Santiago vis-à-vis the upcoming 2021 municipal election. She thus ran as mayoral candidate in the May 2021 election. With remaining votes still to be counted, she called her win over incumbent Mayor Felipe Alessandri (RN) in the Plaza de Armas past 1 AM of 17 May 2021 amidst chants of "Irací, el otro no".

In a 2021 interview with BBC following her victory, Hassler identified ending food insecurity and discrimination against migrants in Santiago as top priorities of her incoming administration. Hassler was joined by Mayor of Recoleta and 2021 presidential candidate Daniel Jadue, a fellow communist, in a tour of the Barrio Lastarria. An advocate of municipal socialism, Hassler stating that "communist management in a local government can transform people's lives".

According to El País, Hassler has named U.S. Representative Alexandria Ocasio-Cortez, Mayor of Barcelona Ada Colau, and late Chilean communist leader Gladys Marín as left-wing women in politics she admires.

In 2024 Chilean municipal elections, she lost the re-election of Santiago, defeated by Mario Desbordes (RN) who got over 22% of more votes than Hassler. She later resigned as mayor to participate in the 2025 Chilean parliamentary elections.
