= Carlos Bombal =

Chilean politician (born 1950)

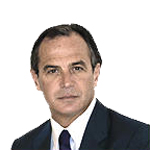

Member of the Senate
- In office 11 March 1998 – 11 March 2006
- Preceded by: Sebastián Piñera
- Succeeded by: Pablo Longueira
- Constituency: 8th Circunscription

Member of the Chamber of Deputies
- In office 11 March 1994 – 11 March 1998
- Preceded by: Eliana Caraball
- Succeeded by: Julio Dittborn
- Constituency: 23th District
- In office 11 March 1990 – 11 March 1994
- Preceded by: District created
- Succeeded by: Alberto Cardemil
- Constituency: 22nd District

Mayor of Santiago Centro
- In office 9 March 1981 – 21 July 1988
- Preceded by: Patricio Guzmán Mira
- Succeeded by: Gustavo Alessandri Valdés

Personal details
- Born: 26 November 1950 (age 75) Chimbarongo, Chile
- Party: Unión Democráta Independiente
- Spouse: Mónica Molina
- Children: Two
- Parent(s): Isabel Otaegui; Carlos Bombal Prieto
- Relatives: María Luisa Bombal (niece)
- Education: Pontifical Catholic University of Chile (LL.B)
- Occupation: Politician
- Profession: Lawyer

Carlos Ramón Juan Bombal Otaegui (Santiago, 26 November 1950) is a Chilean lawyer and politician, former parliamentarian for the 8th Constituency of the Santiago Metropolitan Region, serving from 1998 to 2006.

A member of the Independent Democratic Union (UDI), he served as mayor of Santiago between 1981 and 1987.

== Biography ==
=== Family and education ===
He is the son of Carlos Bombal Prieto and Isabel Otaegui Carvallo. His aunt was the writer María Luisa Bombal.

He completed his primary and secondary education at the Sacred Hearts of Alameda College (SSCC), graduating in 1967. He then entered the Faculty of Law of the Pontifical Catholic University of Chile, where he earned his law degree and became a lawyer in 1977.

In 1972 he was elected president of the Law Students' Center (1972–1973); later, in 1974, he served as Chief of Staff to the Rector of the Catholic University (1974–1976).

He married Mónica Molina Villaseca, and they have two children.

=== Professional career ===
After obtaining his law degree, he began practicing professionally. In 1979 he provided legal advice to the Presidency of the Republic, and simultaneously served as general secretary of Banco Osorno and legal advisor to the presidency of Banco O'Higgins in 1980.

From 1987 to 1989 he served as general secretary of the Compañía Manufacturera de Papeles y Cartones (CMPC).

After leaving the Senate, he worked as an advisor for Empresas Penta. Between 2011 and 2013, he was president of the pension fund administrator AFP Cuprum.

== Political career ==
In 1970, Carlos Bombal joined Chile Joven ("Young Chile"), a conservative youth organization that backed Jorge Alessandri's presidential campaign. The group participated in the so-called "terror campaign" that sought to prevent Salvador Allende's victory, an episode later investigated by the Chamber of Deputies.

During Allende's government he entered the Youth branch of the National Party, positioning himself within Chile's right-wing student leadership during a time of intense ideological polarization.

=== Pinochet regime ===
Following the 1973 coup d'état, Bombal integrated into the structures of the new regime, serving between 1976 and 1979 as Deputy Secretary of the National Youth Secretariat.

On 9 July 1977 he took part in the symbolic Chacarillas Ceremony on Chacarillas Hill, where General Augusto Pinochet outlined the institutional framework that would define the dictatorship's political order. This episode marked Bombal's public alignment with the regime's project of controlled modernization and political reconstruction.

In 1981 he was appointed mayor of Santiago, overseeing the capital's administration during a period of authoritarian urban reform until 1987. Two years later he helped found the Independent Democratic Union (UDI), which became the principal party of Chile's civilian right under military rule. His mayoral tenure and partisan work established him as a key link between the dictatorship's technocratic administration and the emerging democratic right.

=== Parliamentary career: 1990–2006 ===
With the return to democracy, Bombal was elected deputy in 1989 under the Democracy and Progress coalition and re-elected in 1993. As a legislator he served on several permanent committees—including Government, Education, and Constitution, Legislation and Justice—and participated in multiple investigative commissions. He officially joined the Independent Democratic Union in 1991 and presided over its Political Commission, helping to consolidate the party's parliamentary strategy in the 1990s.

In 1997 he was elected senator for the Santiago Metropolitan Region (East) for the 1998–2006 term. He chaired the Senate Health Committee, later the Labor and Social Security Committee, and briefly served as Vice President of the Senate between 2003 and 2004, while also acting as UDI vice president. After an unsuccessful bid for a Senate seat in Biobío in 2005, he retired from active politics in 2006.
