= Felipe Alessandri =

Chilean politician

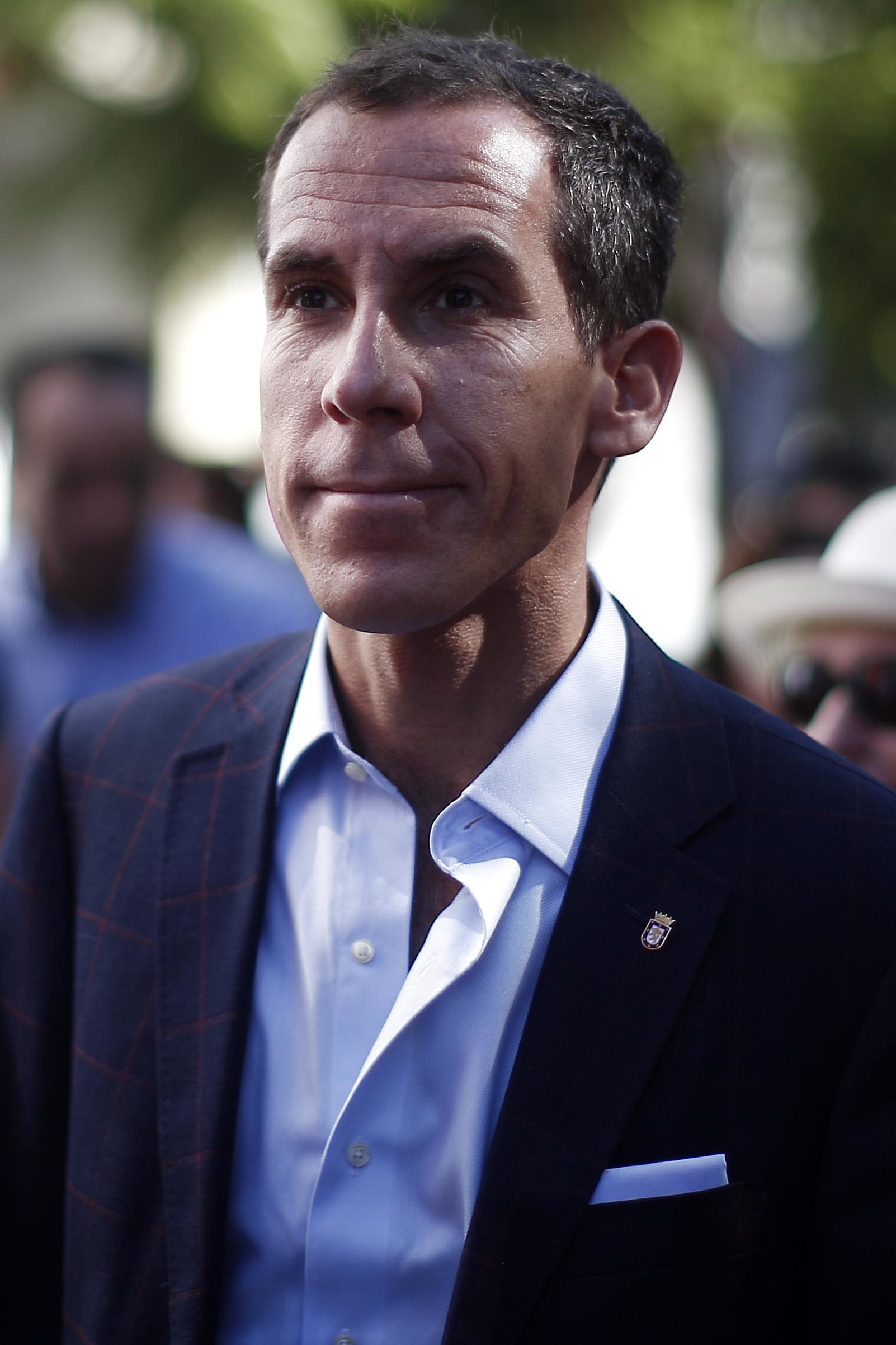
- Alessandri in 2017

Mayor of Lo Barnechea
- Incumbent
- Assumed office December 6, 2024
- Preceded by: Cristóbal Lira

Mayor of Santiago
- In office December 6, 2016 – June 28, 2021
- Preceded by: Carolina Tohá
- Succeeded by: Irací Hassler

Personal details
- Born: February 4, 1975 (age 51) Las Condes, Chile
- Party: National Renewal (2004–present)
- Parent(s): Gustavo Alessandri Valdés; Constanza Vergara
- Relatives: Jorge Alessandri Vergara (brother)
- Education: Finis Terrae University
- Occupation: Politician
- Profession: Lawyer

Felipe Alessandri Vergara (born February 4, 1975) is a Chilean politician who is the mayor elect of Lo Barnechea and previously served as mayor of the commmune of Santiago. He is militant of centre-right party National Renewal (RN).

== Early life ==
He was born on February 4, 1975, in Las Condes, Chile, and grew up in what is now Lo Barnechea.

== Political career ==
In 2016, he won the municipal elections to Carolina Tohá from centre-left party Party for Democracy (PPD).

In 2021, he lost the municipal elections against leftist economist Irací Hassler from Communist Party.
