= Carabineros Hospital =

Medical facility in Ñuñoa, Santiago, Chile

Coordinates: 33°27′00″S 70°36′32″W

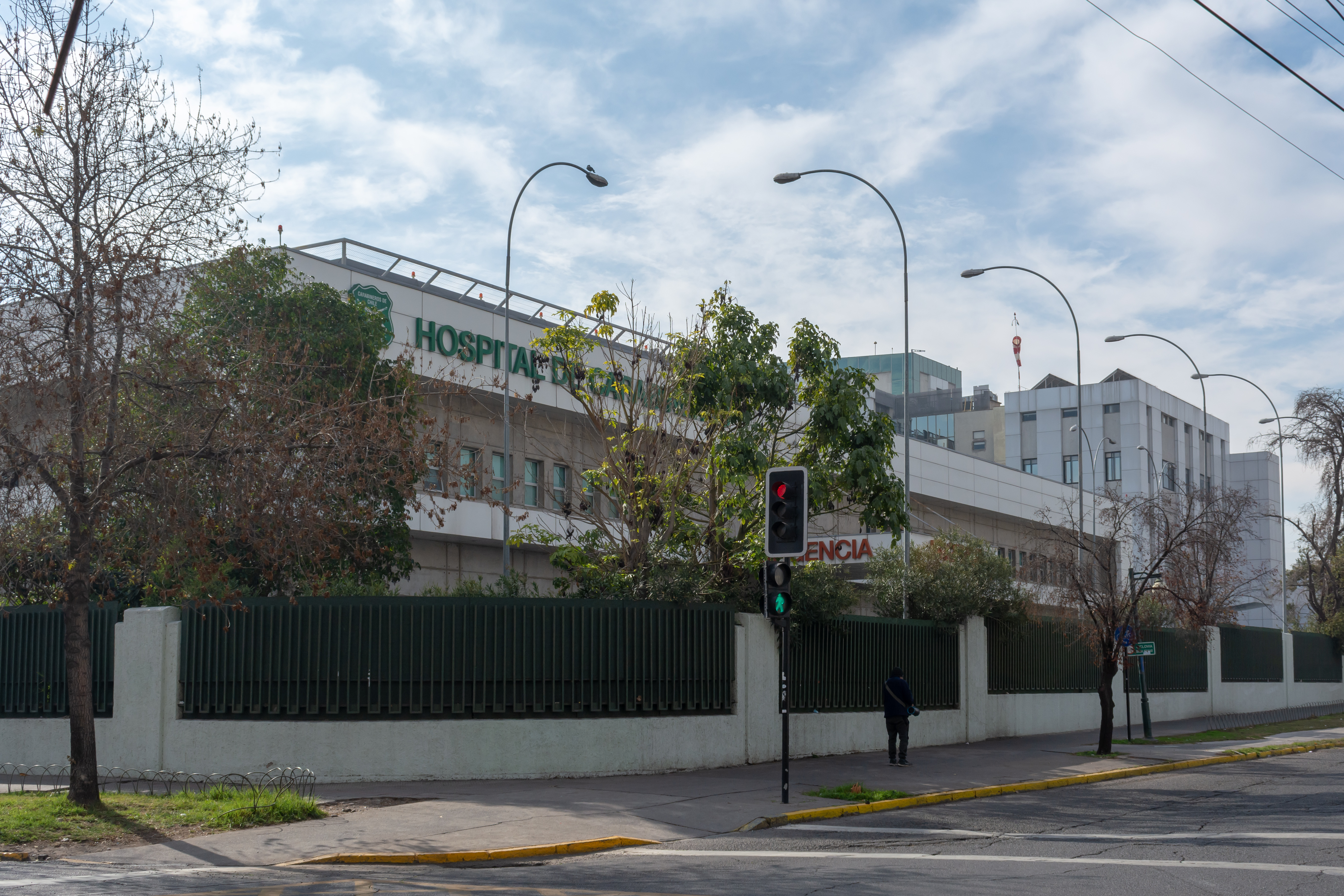
Carabineros Hospital

The Carabineros Hospital of General Humberto Arriagada Valdivieso is a medical facility under the Health and Sanitation Directorate of Carabineros de Chile, forming part of the healthcare network of the Carabineros Health System. It is located at 2500 Antonio Varas Avenue, in the Ñuñoa district of Santiago, Chile.

== History ==
In 1932, General Director Humberto Arriagada Valdivieso established a permanent salary deduction for all institution personnel to contribute to the construction of the hospital.

The hospital was officially created on March 6, 1945, and inaugurated on April 27, 1945. In commemoration of the 50th anniversary of the founding of Carabineros, on April 27, 1977, it was named after General Humberto Arriagada.
