= Gustavo Alessandri Valdés =

Chilean politician (1929–2017)

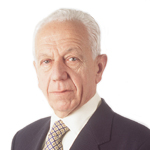
- Alessandri Valdés (2010)

Member of the Chamber of Deputies
- In office 11 March 1998 – 11 March 2002
- Preceded by: Ángel Fantuzzi
- Succeeded by: Cristian Pareto
- Constituency: 20th District
- In office 15 May 1969 – 21 September 1973
- Succeeded by: Dissolution of the Office (1973 Chilean coup d'etat)
- Constituency: 7th Departamental Agrupation (Metropolitan Region)
- In office 15 May 1961 – 15 May 1965

Mayor of Santiago Centro
- In office 21 July 1987 – 4 January 1989
- Appointed by: Augusto Pinochet
- Preceded by: Carlos Bombal
- Succeeded by: Máximo Honorato

Mayor of La Florida
- In office 1958–1961
- Preceded by: Vicente Valdés
- Succeeded by: Luis Matte Valdés

Personal details
- Born: 30 April 1929 Santiago, Chile
- Died: 18 July 2017 (aged 88) Santiago, Chile
- Party: Liberal Party (1949–1966); National Party (1966–1973); National Union Movement (1983–1987); National Renewal (1987–2017)
- Spouse(s): Verónica Balmaceda (div.); Constanza Vergara
- Children: (Six, among them Felipe and Jorge)
- Education: Pontifical Catholic University of Chile (LL.B)
- Occupation: Politician
- Profession: Lawyer

Gustavo Alessandri Valdés (30 April 1929 – 18 July 2017) was a Chilean politician and lawyer who was born in Santiago, served as mayor of its central commune from 1987 through 1989, as MP from 1961 through 1965, again from 1969 through 1971 and finally from 1998 to 2002, as a member of the National Renewal Party until his death in his hometown, aged 88.

== Early life and family ==
Alessandri was born in Santiago on 30 April 1929. He was the son of Gustavo Alessandri Altamirano and Elena Valdés Freire. He was the great-grandson of Ramón Freire Serrano, grandson of José Pedro Alessandri Palma, grandnephew of Arturo Alessandri, first cousin once removed of Jorge Alessandri, and second cousin of Arturo Alessandri Besa.

He first married Verónica Balmaceda, with whom he had three children, including former deputy Gustavo Alessandri Balmaceda. In his second marriage, to Constanza Vergara Vicuña, he had three children, including deputy Jorge Alessandri Vergara and Felipe Alessandri, mayor of Santiago.

== Professional career ==
He completed his secondary education at the Instituto de Humanidades Luis Campino. He then entered the Faculty of Law at the Pontifical Catholic University of Chile, graduating as a lawyer in 1949.

As a university student between 1948 and 1949, he worked as a journalist during the Nuremberg trials. After qualifying as a lawyer, he joined Empresa Importadora Wal Ltda., where he served as deputy manager, later sales manager, and subsequently member of the board of directors. He furthered his studies at the School of Political Science in Paris and at the University of Salamanca, specializing in Comparative European Constitutional Law.

In the private sector, he engaged in commercial, industrial, and agricultural activities. He served as director of several companies, including Banco Español, Fibrocemento Pudahuel, Tattersall, Importadora Watts, Banco del Pacífico, Compañía de Seguros La Santiago, and Aeromar. He was president of Industrias S.A. and vice president of Hoteles Unidos S.A., and was founder of Compañía Chilena de Fósforos and Santander Inversiones. Upon being elected deputy, he resigned from all these board positions.

On 27 April 2001, he joined the board of Compañía Chilena de Fósforos S.A., having previously served as its vice president in 2004.

== Political career ==
He began his political career as an independent candidate for councillor in the commune of La Florida. He was elected in 1956 and served until 1960, when he was elected mayor of the same commune.

In 1960, he joined the Liberal Party and was a member of its Executive Board between 1963 and 1965. He resigned in 1965 and joined the National Party the following year. He served as vice president of the party between 1969 and 1970, was a member of its Political Commission, and served as second vice president between June 1972 and June 1973. He later became director of the party.

In 1987, he joined National Renewal. That same year, he was appointed mayor of the commune of Santiago, serving from 21 July 1987 to 4 January 1989.

In 1993, he ran for deputy in District No. 40 but was not elected. In 2001, he again ran for deputy in District No. 20 but was not elected.

He died on 18 July 2017 in Santiago.
