= Plaza Ñuñoa =

Square in Santiago, Chile

Coordinates: 33°27′20″S 70°35′37″W

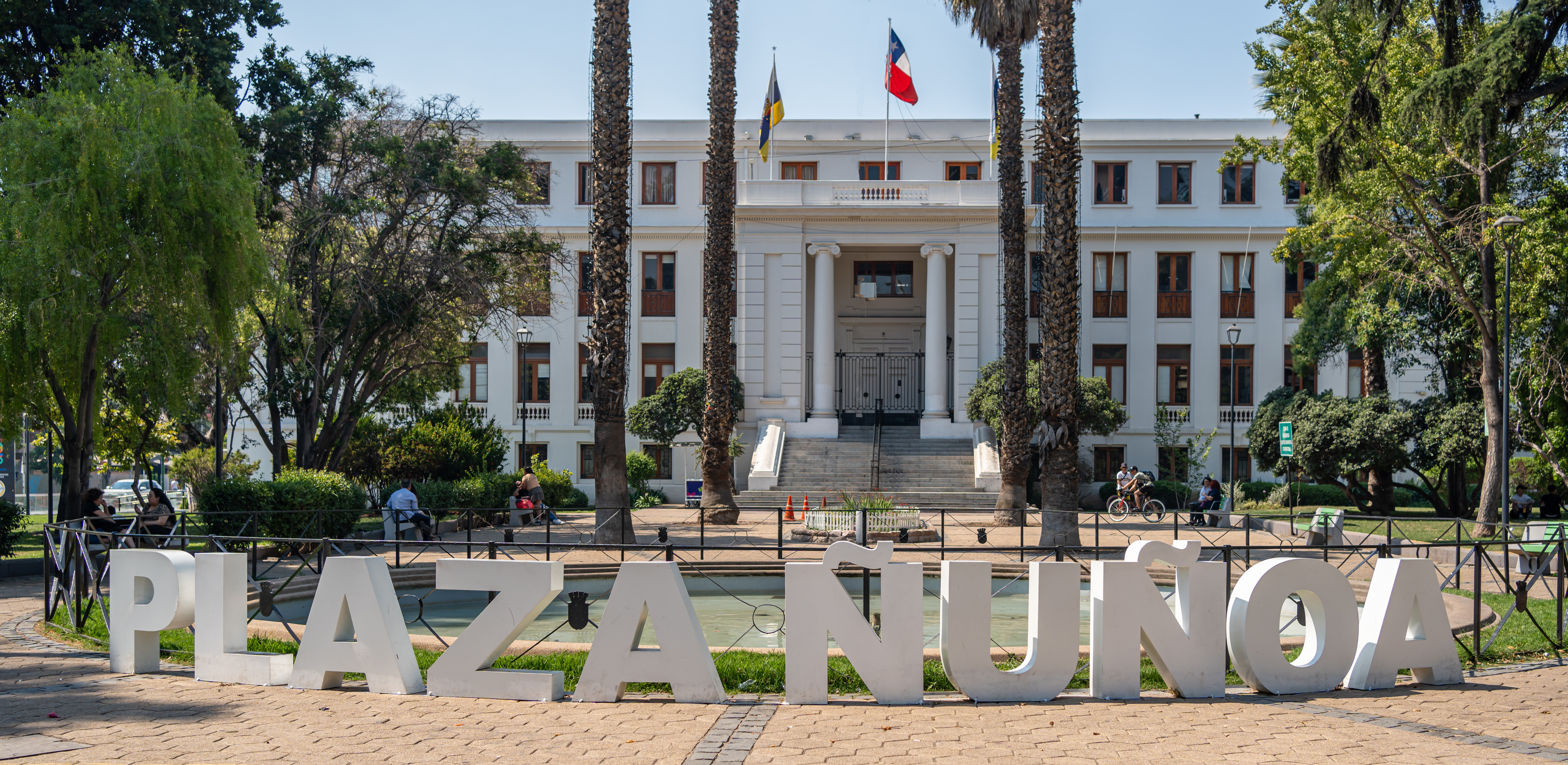
City hall in Plaza Ñuñoa

Plaza Ñuñoa is found in the Ñuñoa commune of Santiago, Chile, located in the eastern part of the city. It is classic meeting place well known for its cultural centers, entertainment venues, restaurants, bars, nightlife, and ice cream stores. Plaza Ñuñoa is also where an alternative music scene fomented.

== Location ==
Plaza Ñuñoa is located between Irarrázaval Avenue and Duble Almeyda Avenue and between Jorge Washington street and Manuel de Salas street. The plaza also extends north of Irarrázaval Avenue. The closest metro station is Irarrázaval or Plaza Egaña, neither of which are particularly close to the Plaza. The plaza is accessible on any of the buses that go from the center of Santiago to La Reina commune: 227, 403, 422, 505, 513, 514.

== History ==
The neighborhood development began with adjacent lots along Irarrázaval Avenue. The large palm trees on the southern side of the avenue make the plaza visually appealing. When the trolleys started passing through and small shops began to appear, activity intensified in the sector. Plaza Ñuñoa became important at the end of the 1960s, with increased urbanification of the side of the city nearer to the mountains. In carrying out a study about social psychology, memory, and spatiality in Santiago, Chile scholars focused on Plaza Ñuñoa.

In the 1980s Plaza Ñuñoa became the beer drinking destination of intellectuals and students who frequented bar Las Lanzas, a place that began to be identified as cultural and leftist. There is also a bar and nightclub called La Batuta that provided a location for the burgeoning rock scene in Chile beginning in 1989.

Established at Plaza Ñuñoa in the 1970s, Teatro Universidad Católica, formerly called Teatro Dante, is a theatre on Jorge Washington street that attracts world-class productions.

== Plaza Ñuñoa in literature ==
The plaza has provided the setting for numerous Chilean novels, including those by authors such as Dauno Tótoro Taulis, Ramón Díaz Eterovic, Cristóbal Peña, Ricardo E. Rodríguez, Jesús Sepúlveda, Elizabeth Subercaseaux and Carlos Labbé. The novel The Private Lives of Trees, by the Chilean author, Alejandro Zambra, and Juan Villegas Morales' Yo Tenía un Compañero both feature the plaza.
