= Barrio Italia =

Traditional part of Santiago, Chile

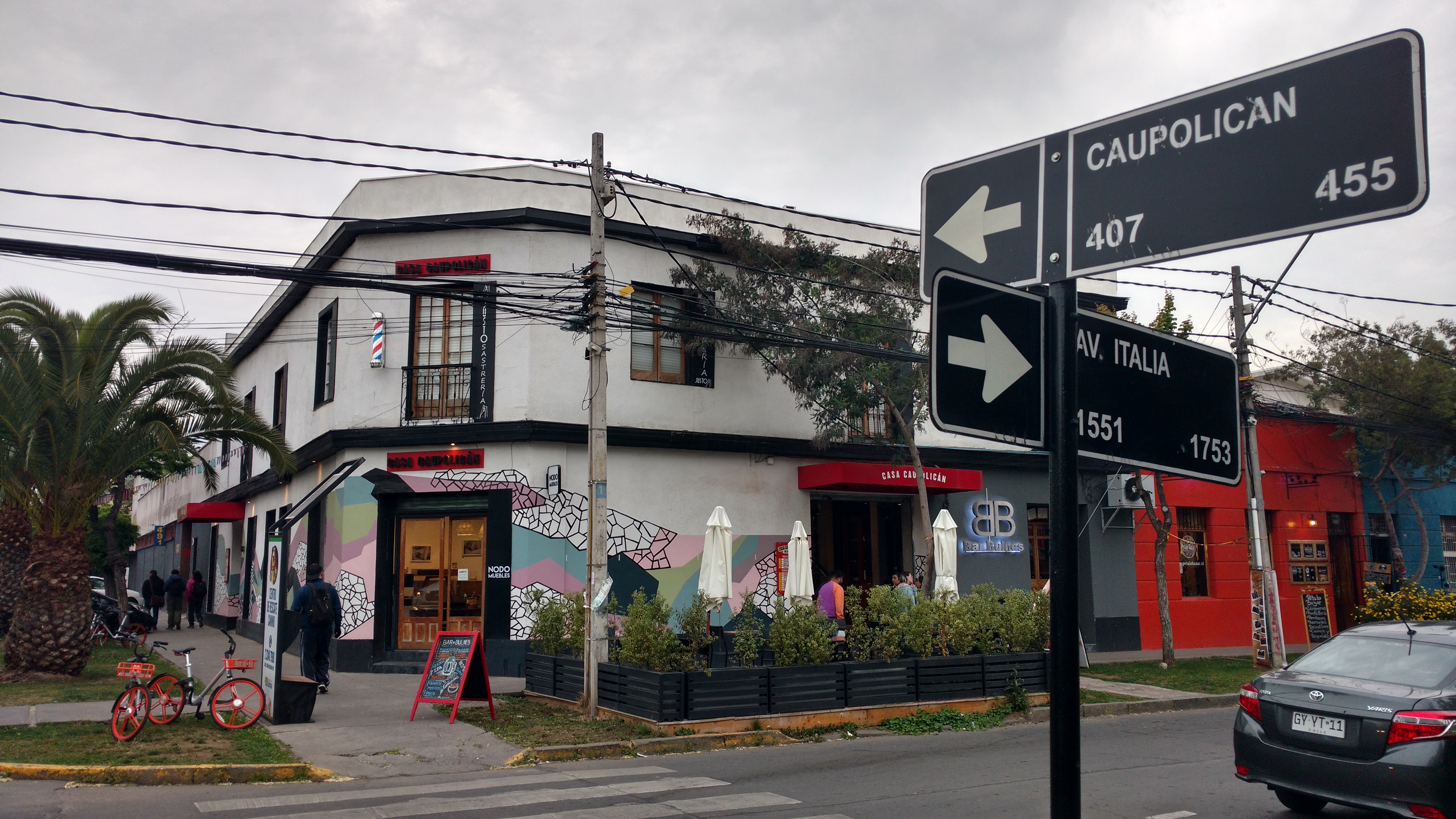
Casa Caupolicán in Barrio Italia

Barrio Italia is a historic neighborhood in Ñuñoa and Providencia in Santiago, Chile. The neighborhood contains a number of heritage buildings where immigrant artisans from different countries lived during Santiago's past. Most notably, Barrio Italia was historically populated by Italian immigrants after whom the neighborhood is named, being in practical terms a Little Italy in the Chilean capital.

At present, Barrio Italia is recognized in the Chilean capital for its wide gastronomic offerings, specifically international cuisine, of which there are various restaurants and cafes specializing in Italian, Chilean, Peruvian, Chinese, Ecuadorian, Spanish, French, Texan, Uruguayan, Venezuelan, Vietnamese, Turkish, Indian, and Thai foods. Other amenities within Barrio Italia include shops, warehouses, workshops, the Italian embassy, and various educational institutions. The neighborhood has a reputation as a bohemian or hipster area of Santiago.

The boundaries of Barrio Italia are Avenue Francisco Bilbao to the north, Avenue Salvador to the east, Avenue Irarrázaval to the south, and Avenue Seminario to the west. The present-day commercial epicenter of the neighborhood, however, is located in Avenue Italia and Avenue Santa Isabel.
