= Brazil–Chile relations =

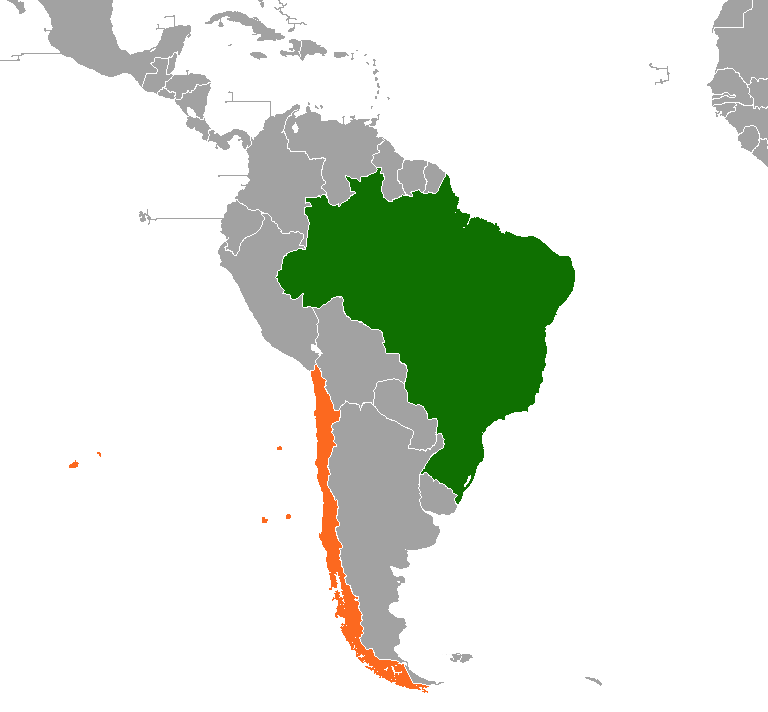
- Brazil: Chile

Envoy
- Ambassador Paulo Pacheco: Ambassador; Issa Kort

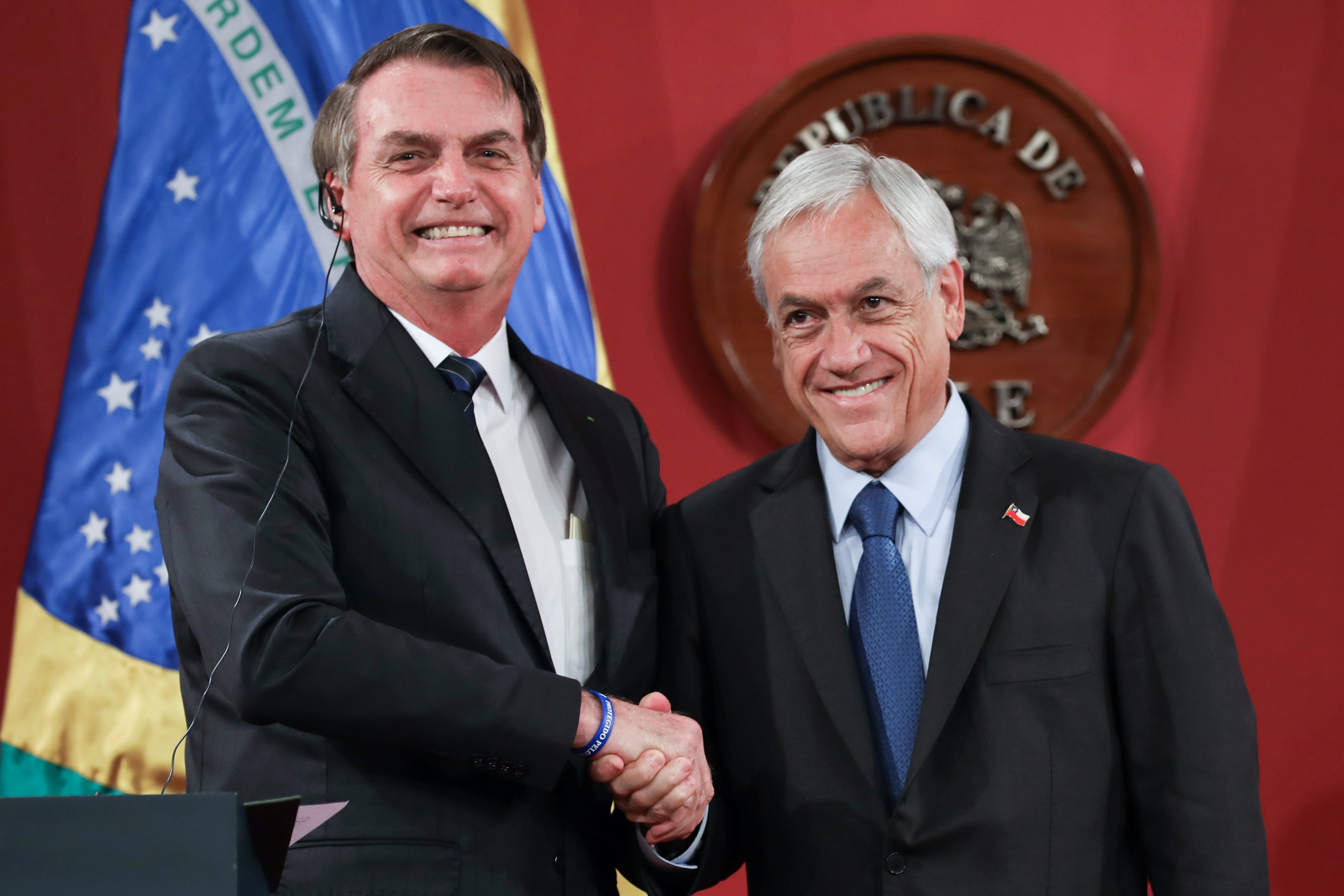
Presidents Sebastián Piñera of Chile and Jair Bolsonaro of Brazil.

Brazil–Chile relations are the interstate relations between Brazil and Chile. Chile and Brazil have acted numerous times as mediators in international conflicts, such as in the 1914 diplomatic impasse between the United States and Mexico, avoiding a possible state of war between those two countries. More recently, since the 2004 Haiti rebellion, Chile and Brazil have participated in the United Nations Stabilization Mission in Haiti, which was led by the Brazilian Army.

According to a 2014 BBC World Service poll, 62% of Chileans view Brazil's influence positively, with only 12% expressing a negative view.

Although Chile is one of the two South American countries that do not share a border with Brazil (along with Ecuador), there is frequent direct air traffic for passengers and cargo between the two countries, as well as overland routes crossing Argentina or Bolivia, with or without passing through Paraguay or Uruguay depending on the route.

The acronym Brachileno is commonly used to refer to communities of descendants and residents of one country in the other, as a symbol of unity and cultural syncretism. The community of Chileans residing in Brazil is the second-largest Chilean diaspora in South America and the sixth-largest worldwide.

== History ==
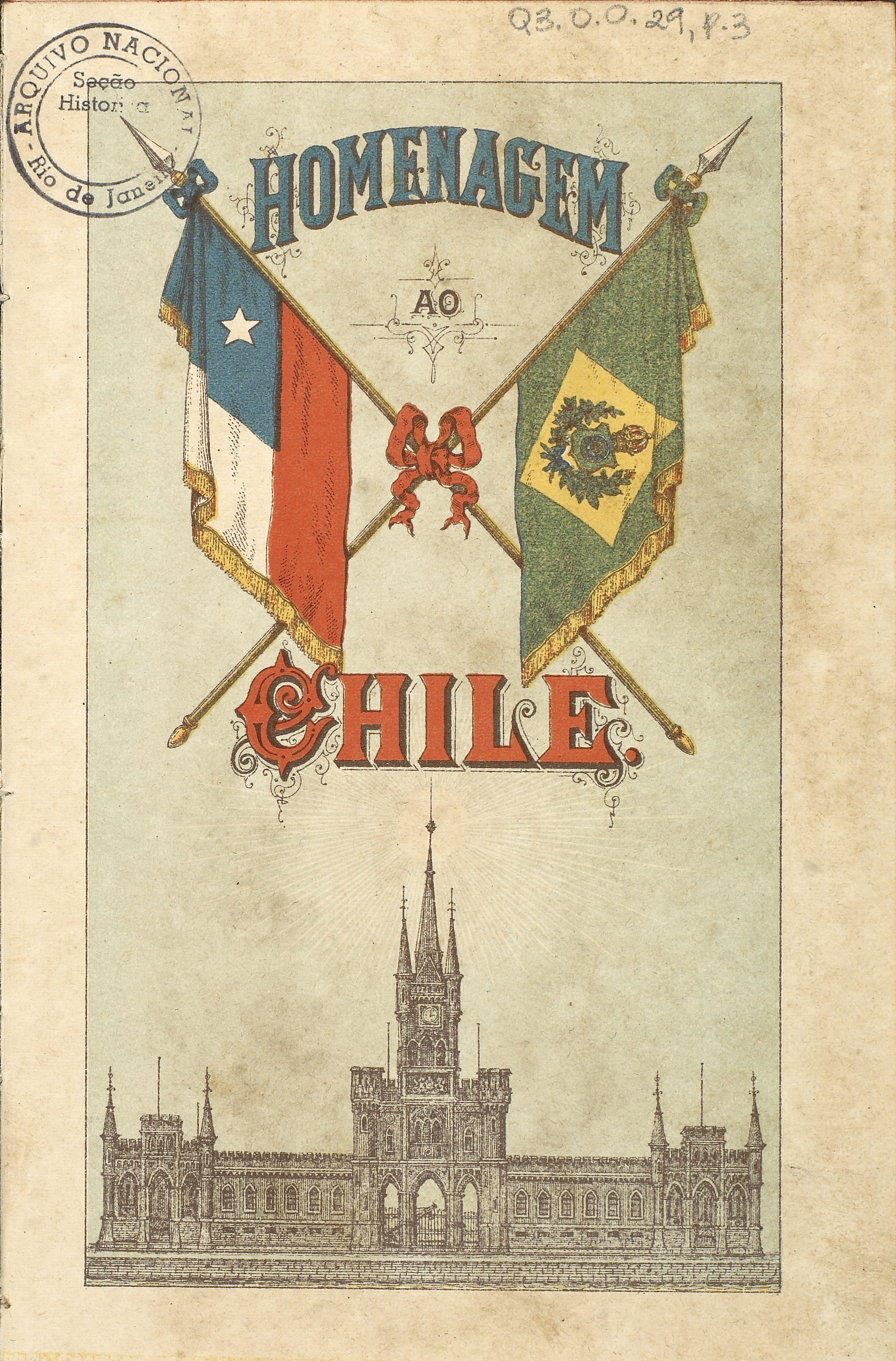
Cover of the menu of the banquet offered to the officers of the Chilean battleship Almirante Cochrane by the President of the Council of Ministers, the Viscount of Ouro Preto, held on Fiscal Island on 9 November 1889

During much of the 19th and the 20th centuries, conflicts with Argentina over Uruguay and Paraguay on behalf of Brazil and over Patagonia on behalf of Chile made Brazil and Chile close allies. During the War of the Pacific, with Chile fighting against Peru and Bolivia, Brazil provided tacit support for Chile, and forced Argentina, which attempted to join the Peruvian–Bolivian alliance, to stay neutral throughout the war.

On May 20, 1914, Argentina, Brazil and Chile (the ABC countries) met in Niagara Falls, Canada, to mediate diplomatically to avoid a state of war between the United States and Mexico over the Veracruz Incident and the Tampico Affair.

On May 15, 1915, the three met again to sign a more formal treaty. The Consultation, Non-Aggression, and Arbitration Pact was designed to foment co-operation, non-aggression and the arbitration of disputes. It was formulated to resist American influence in the region and to establish a mechanism for consultation among the three signatory countries, such as by setting up a permanent mediation commission.

== Economic relations and shared memberships ==
In 1996, Chile became an associate member of Mercosur, which enabled a series of bilateral agreements and treaties between Brazil and Chile within the economic framework of the regional bloc. Among these, the signing of the Chile–Mercosur Economic Complementation Agreement stands out; it entered into force on 1 October of that same year and remains fully in effect.

In macroeconomic terms, Chile mainly exports to Brazil products and by-products derived from copper, salmon, and potassium chloride; Chilean wine is also notable, with Brazil ranking as the fourth-largest global destination for exports of this product. Brazil, meanwhile, exports primarily crude petroleum oils, automobiles, and beef to Chile. In 2023, trade between the two countries amounted to US$13.05 billion, representing an average annual growth of 5.3% over the past five years. Chile's main exports were copper cathodes, salmon, and molybdenum concentrates, while Brazil mainly exported crude petroleum oils and passenger motor vehicles.

There is a project for the construction of a bi-oceanic corridor intended to link the Chilean port of Antofagasta on the Pacific Ocean with the Brazilian port of Paranaguá on the Atlantic Ocean.

Regarding mutual participation in international organizations, both countries are full member states of the Union of South American Nations (UNASUR), the Economic Commission for Latin America and the Caribbean (ECLAC), the Community of Latin American and Caribbean States (CELAC), the Organization of American States (OAS), and the Organization of Ibero-American States for Education, Science and Culture (OEI).

== Alliance ==
=== Military alliance ===
- ABC countries along with Argentina

== Resident diplomatic missions ==
Of Brazil

- Santiago de Chile (Embassy)
- Santiago de Chile (Consulate-General)

Of Chile

- Brasília (Embassy)
- Porto Alegre (Consulate-General)
- Rio de Janeiro (Consulate-General)
- São Paulo (Consulate-General)

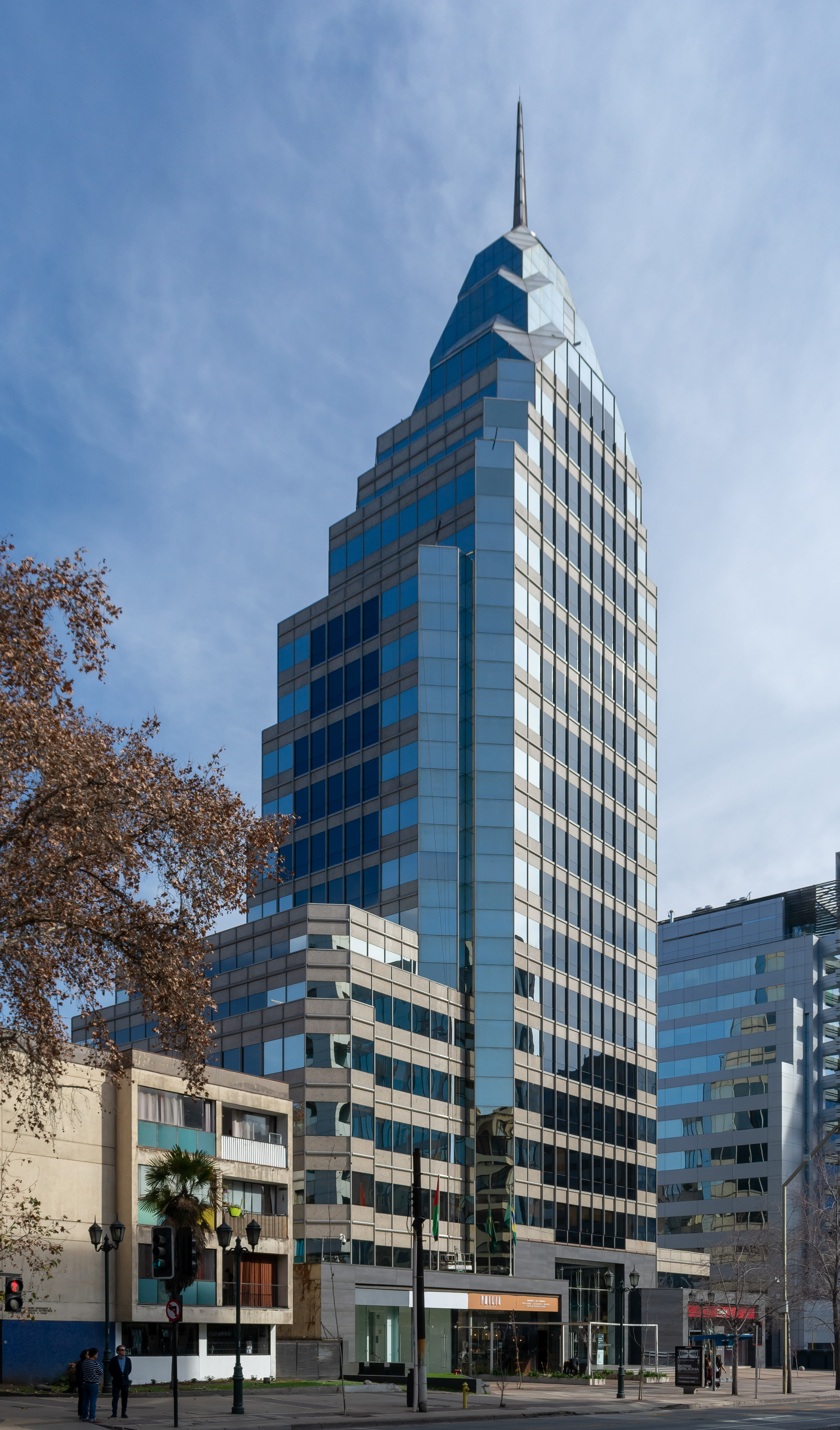
Building hosting the Embassy of Brazil in Santiago de Chile

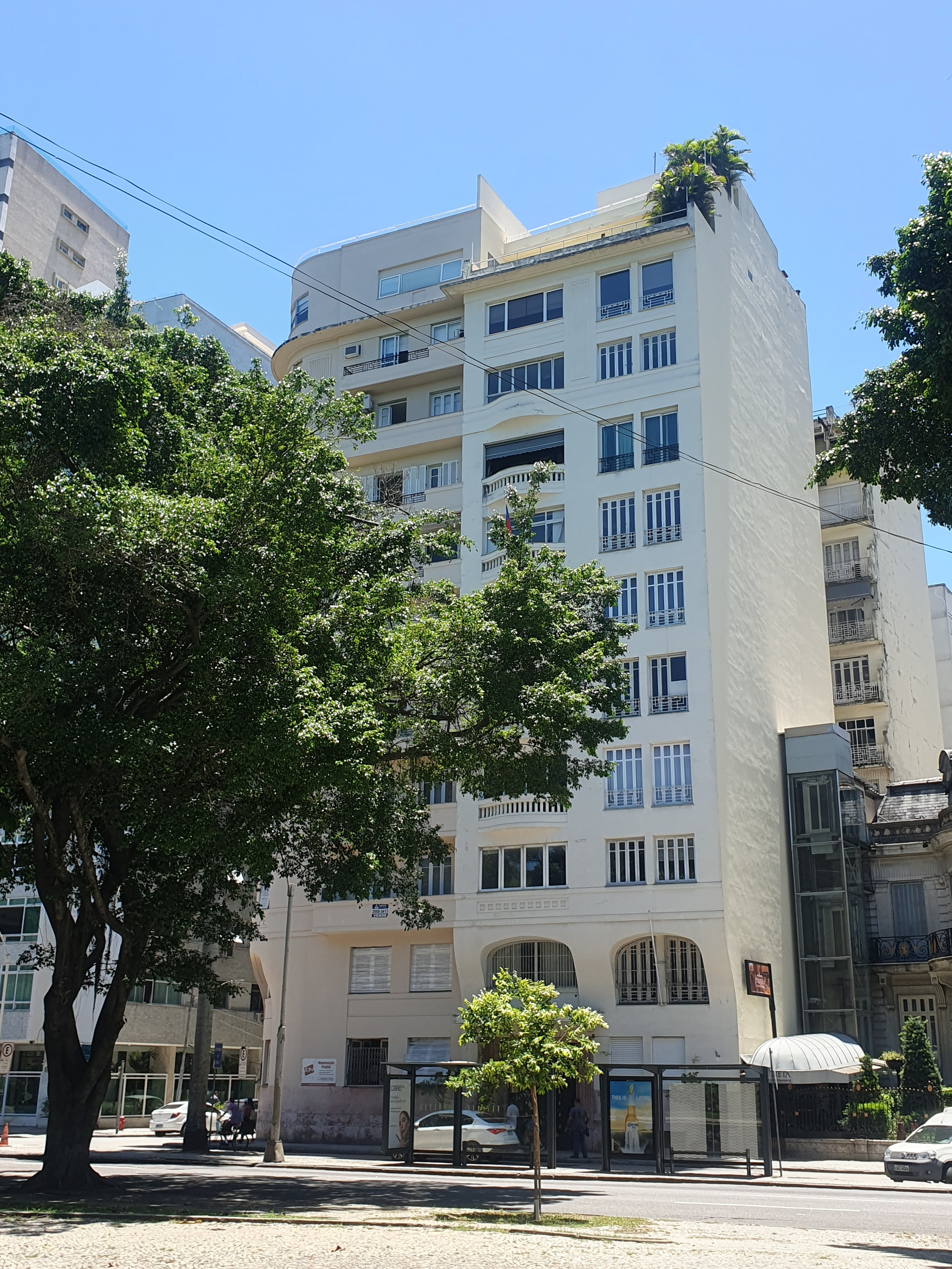
Building hosting the Consulate-General of Chile in Rio de Janeiro

== See also ==
- ABC countries
- Foreign relations of Brazil
- Foreign relations of Chile
- South American dreadnought race
- Chilean Brazilians
