= Jorge Alessandri Vergara =

Chilean politician

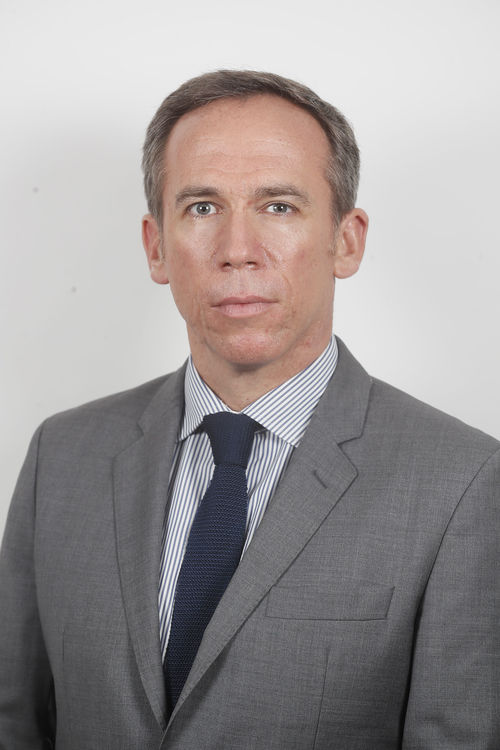
- Official portrait, 2022

President of the Chamber of Deputies
- Incumbent
- Assumed office 11 March 2026
- Vice President: Felipe Camaño; Ximena Ossandón
- Preceded by: José Miguel Castro

Member of the Chamber of Deputies
- Incumbent
- Assumed office 11 March 2018
- Preceded by: District established
- Constituency: District 10

Member of the Santiago City Council
- In office 6 December 2008 – 6 December 2012

Personal details
- Born: 8 June 1979 (age 47) Santiago, Chile
- Party: Independent Democratic Union
- Spouse: Teresita García de la Huerta
- Children: 3
- Parent(s): Gustavo Alessandri Valdés; Constanza Vergara
- Relatives: Alessandri family
- Education: University of the Andes (LLB)

Jorge Iván Alessandri Vergara (born 8 June 1979) is a Chilean politician who has served as President of the Chamber of Deputies since 2026 and as a member of the Chamber of Deputies since 2018, representing District 10 of the Santiago Metropolitan Region. (Note: District 10 is composed by the communes of La Granja, Macul, Ñuñoa, Providencia, San Joaquín and Santiago.)

== Biography ==
Jorge Alessandri Vergara was born in Santiago on 8 June 1979. He is the son of Gustavo Alessandri Valdés, former member of the Chamber of Deputies and mayor of Santiago and La Florida, and journalist María Constanza Vergara, who has served as editor-in-chief of Paula and Elle magazines and as an executive at Megavisión.

Alessandri is the brother of Felipe Alessandri, former mayor of Santiago (2016–2021) and incumbent mayor of Lo Barnechea. He is married to lawyer Teresita García de la Huerta Vial and is the father of three children.

He attended International School Nido de Aguilas in Lo Barnechea, Santiago between 1986 and 1998. In 1999, he enrolled in the law program at the University of the Andes, graduating with a Bachelor of Laws. His undergraduate thesis, titled "Effects of Bankruptcy in Labor Law", addressed labor implications of insolvency proceedings. He was admitted to the practice of law by the Supreme Court of Chile on 26 April 2017.

=== Professional career ===
In the private sector, Alessandri was involved in various entrepreneurial activities. In 1999, he founded Zentex Ltda., a private security company. He also served as a board member of South Winds Consulting (2014–2017), Inmobiliaria Orbe y Recreo S.A. (2008–2017), and as commercial director of Gestacur (2015–2017).

== Political career ==
Alessandri began his political career as a member of the Independent Democratic Union (UDI) in 2007. In the 2008 municipal elections, he ran for the Santiago City Council, representing UDI. He was elected councilor with 13,924 votes (14.39%), achieving the highest individual vote share. During his tenure as councilor, he led the communal bicentennial legacy project.

In 2010, president Sebastián Piñera appointed him as presidential advisor. He served as deputy director of presidential programming, member of the presidential Cabinet, and coordinator of presidential activities within Chile and abroad, a role he held until 2014.

In 2013, he ran unsuccessfully for the Chamber of Deputies, representing District 27 on behalf of UDI, obtaining 20,012 votes (13.57%). Between 2015 and 2017, he served as national prosecretary of UDI following the appointment of Hernán Larraín as party president.

On 2 July 2017, Alessandri competed in the Chile Vamos primaries to select the UDI candidate for the Chamber of Deputies in District 10 of the Santiago Metropolitan Region. He secured the nomination and was elected in the November 2017 parliamentary elections with 30,833 votes (7.06%).

In August 2021, he ran for re-election in the same district, representing the UDI within the Chile Vamos coalition, and was re-elected with 49,478 votes (10.83%) for the 2022–2026 term. On 16 November 2025, he was elected for a third consecutive term as member of the Chamber of Deputies for the District 10, representing UDI within the Chile Grande y Unido coalition, securing 56,612 votes (8.74%) for the 2026–2030 legislative period.

On 11 March 2026, he was elected as President of the Chamber of Deputies with 78 votes, narrowly defeating the bid of congresswoman Pamela Jiles of the Party of the People, who received 76 votes.
