= Ñuñoa =

- Commune
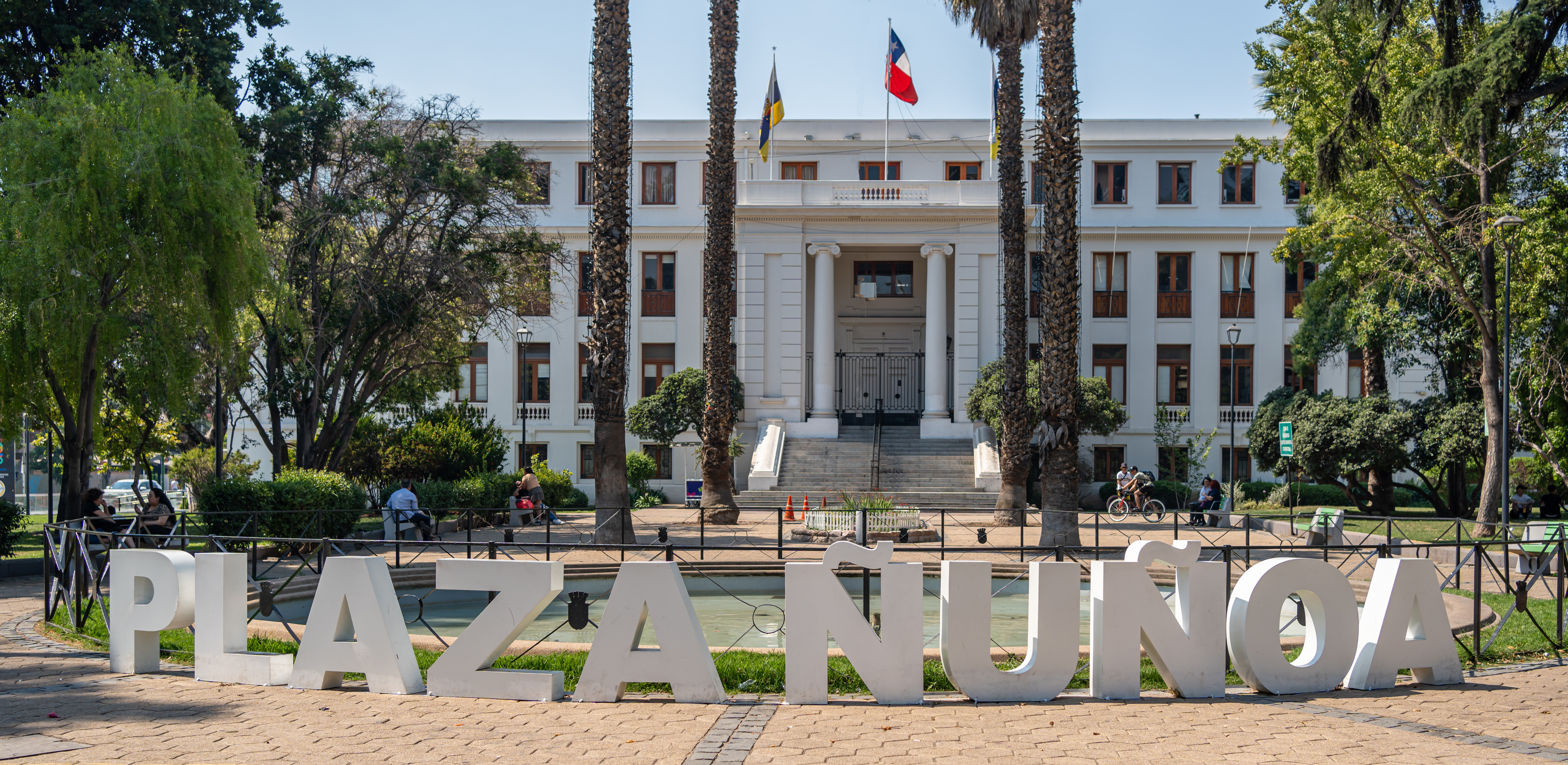
- Ñuñoa City Hall

- Flag Coat of arms Location of Ñuñoa within Greater Santiago Location in Chile
- Coordinates (city): 33°27.5′S 70°36′W
- Country: Chile
- Region: Santiago Metropolitan
- Province: Santiago

Government
  - Type: Municipal
  - Mayor: Sebastián Sichel (Ind.)

Area
  - Total: 16.9 km^{2} (6.5 sq mi)

Population (2024)
  - Total: 241,467
  - Density: 14,300/km^{2} (37,000/sq mi)
- Time zone: UTC-4 (CLT)
  - Summer (DST): UTC-3 (CLST)
- Area code: 56 +
- Website: www.nunoa.cl

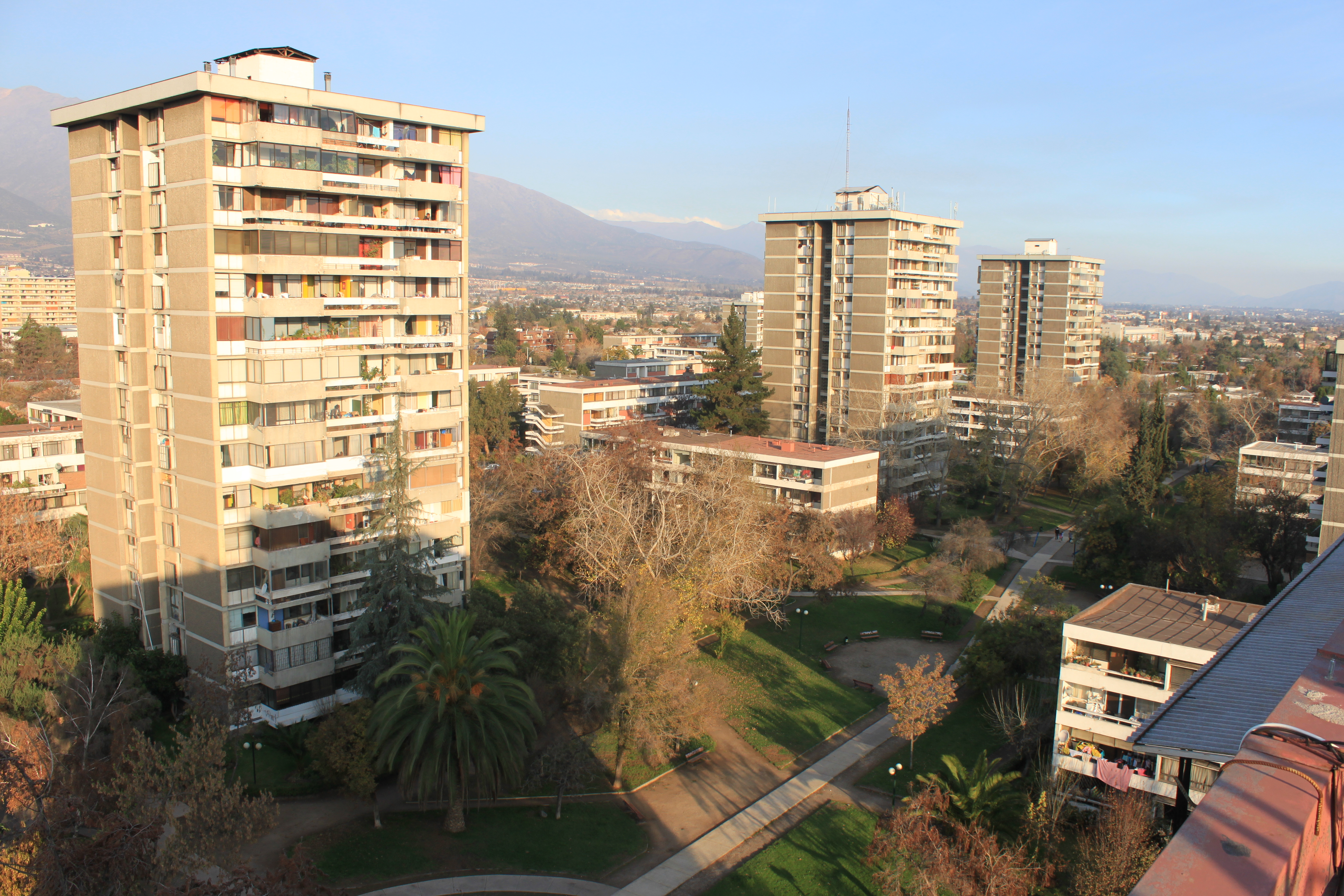
Villa Presidente Frei

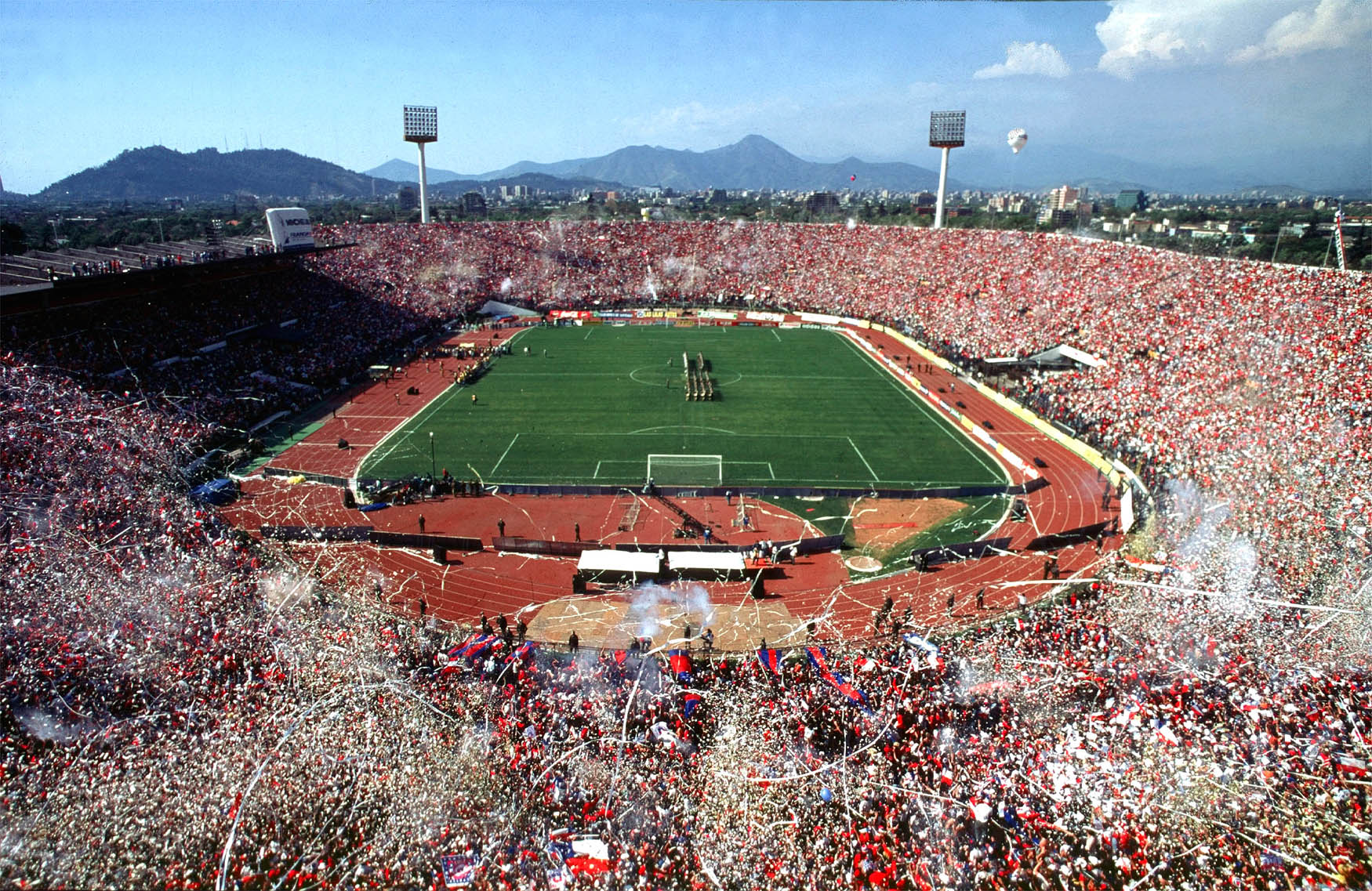
Estadio Nacional Julio Martínez Prádanos.

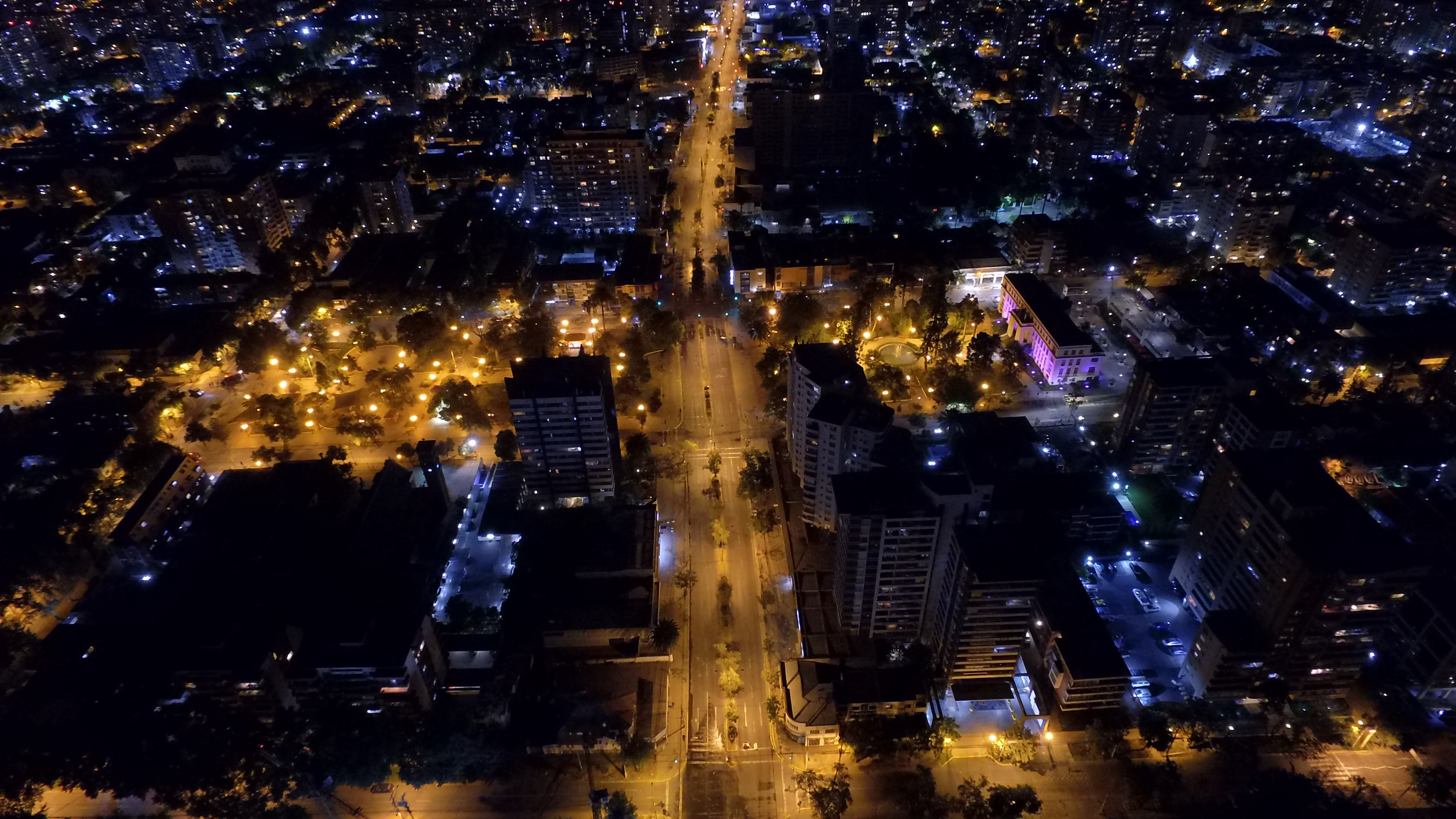
Plaza Ñuñoa at night

Ñuñoa (Spanish pronunciation: [ɲuˈɲo.a]; from Mapudungun Ñuñohue, "place of yellow flowers") is a commune in the northeastern sector of Santiago, the capital of Chile, in the country's Santiago Province in the Santiago Metropolitan Region. Bordered by Providencia to the north and west, Macul to the south, and Peñalolén and La Reina to the east, it has an area of 16.9 km^{2} (6.5 sq mi). It has 241,467 inhabitants.

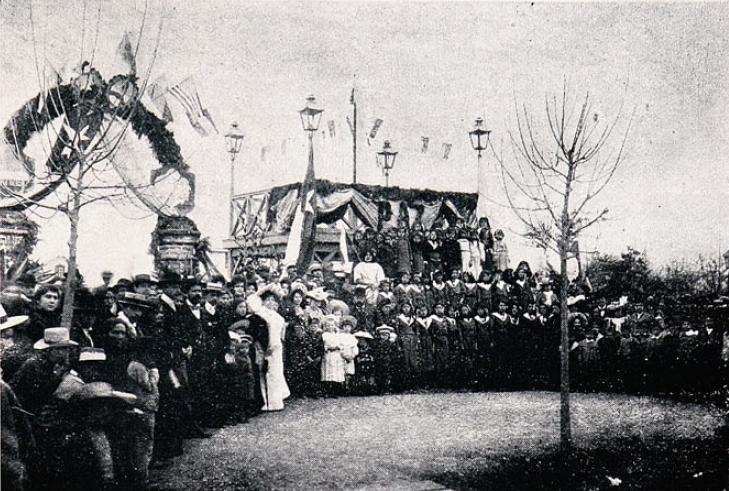
Plaza de Ñuñoa (1902).

Over the years, Ñuñoa has become increasingly desirable for young urban professionals due to its amenities and convenient location. This has contributed to a significant population increase, with the number of inhabitants growing from 163,511 in 2002 to 241,467 in 2024, representing a 47% increase over 22 years. The majority of the population belongs to the medium and upper-middle socioeconomic groups. However, the acquisition of older homes by developers and the construction of multi-dwelling units have faced criticism from long-time residents.

According to the 2021 Urban Life Quality Index (ICVU), Ñuñoa is considered the fourth best commune to live in within the region and the country as a whole. This recognition highlights the favorable living conditions and amenities available in the area. As the oldest municipality in the traditional east end of Santiago, Ñuñoa offers a wide range of services, including subways, banks, and shopping areas. Despite these conveniences, the commune has managed to maintain its character as a predominantly residential and peaceful area.

The main hub of business activity can be found along Irarrázaval Avenue, a 6-kilometer thoroughfare that traverses the entire commune from east to west. This avenue is conveniently supported by Line 3 of the Santiago Metro.

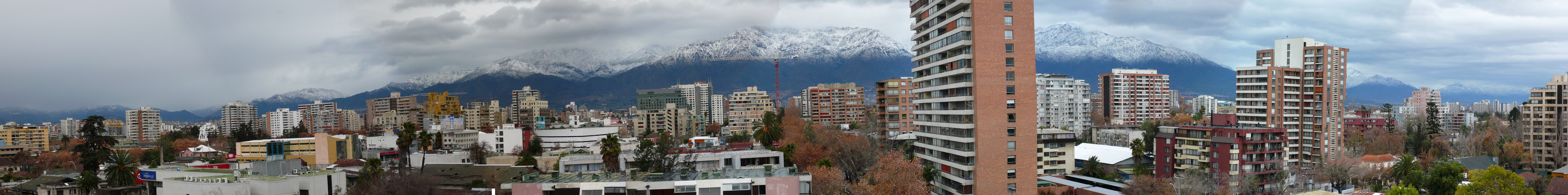
Panoramic view of central Ñuñoa

== Administration ==
As a commune, Ñuñoa is a third-level administrative division of Chile run by a municipal council headed by a mayor elected to a four-year term of office. The current mayor for the 2024-2028 term is Sebastián Sichel Ramírez (Ind), while the communal council has the following members:

- Carlos Vega Cifuentes (REP)
- María Ximena Aros Espinoza (REP)
- Nicolás Saldivia Niklitschek (UDI)
- Guido Benavides Araneda (RN)
- Daniela Bonvallet Setti (RN)
- Verónica Chávez Gutiérrez (FA)
- Andrés Argandoña Besoaín (FA)
- Alejandra Valle Salinas (PC)
- Mireya Del Río Barañao (PC)
- Maite Descouvieres Vargas (PS)

Ñuñoa, Providencia, Santiago, Macul, La Granja, and San Joaquín form the 10th electoral district, which is currently represented in the Chamber of Deputies by José Antonio Kast Adriasola (REP), Hans Marowski (PNL), Jorge Alessandri Vergara (UDI), Francisco Orrego (RN), Gonzalo Winter (FA), Lorena Fries (FA), Irací Hassler (PC), and Emilia Schneider (FA) for the 2026–2030 term. As part of the 7th senatorial constituency (Metropolitan Region), Ñuñoa is represented in the Senate by Rojo Edwards (PSC), Luciano Cruz-Coke (EVOP), Manuel José Ossandón (RN), Fabiola Campillai (Ind.), and Claudia Pascual (PC) for the 2022-2030 term.

== Demographics ==
As of the 2024 census, the population is 241,467, of which 46.2% are males, and 53.8% are females. People aged under 15 years old make up 12.9% of the population, and people aged 65 years old and over make up 14.8%. 100% of the population is urban.

Historical population
| Year | Pop. | ±% p.a. |
|---|---|---|
| 1970 | 149,001 | — |
| 1982 | 168,919 | +1.05% |
| 1992 | 172,575 | +0.21% |
| 2002 | 163,511 | −0.54% |
| 2017 | 208,237 | +1.63% |
| 2024 | 241,467 | +2.14% |
Source: INE, Memoria Chilena

- Average household income per capita: US$44,409 (PPP, 2006)
- Population below poverty line: 4.3% (2006)
- Regional quality of life index: 87.66, high, 1 out of 52 (2005)
- Human Development Index: 0.860, 6 out of 341 (2003)

=== Ethnic minorities ===
As of the 2024 census, Indigenous peoples make up 4.1% of the population, and Afro-Chileans make up 0.9%.

=== Religion ===
As of the 2024 census, 57.4% of the population over 15 years old are Christians (49.2% Catholics, 4.6% Evangelicals or Protestants, and 3.6% other branches), 0.3% are Jews, 0.1% are Muslims, 0.4% are Buddhists, 0.1% are Hinduists, 1.1% are adrehents of other religions, and 40.6% are irreligious.

=== Immigration ===
As of the 2024 census, immigrants make up 13.9% of the population – 12.1% are from South America, 0.8% from North America, 0.7% from Europe, 0.2% from Asia, 0.03% from Africa, and 0.03% from Oceania.

== Sights ==
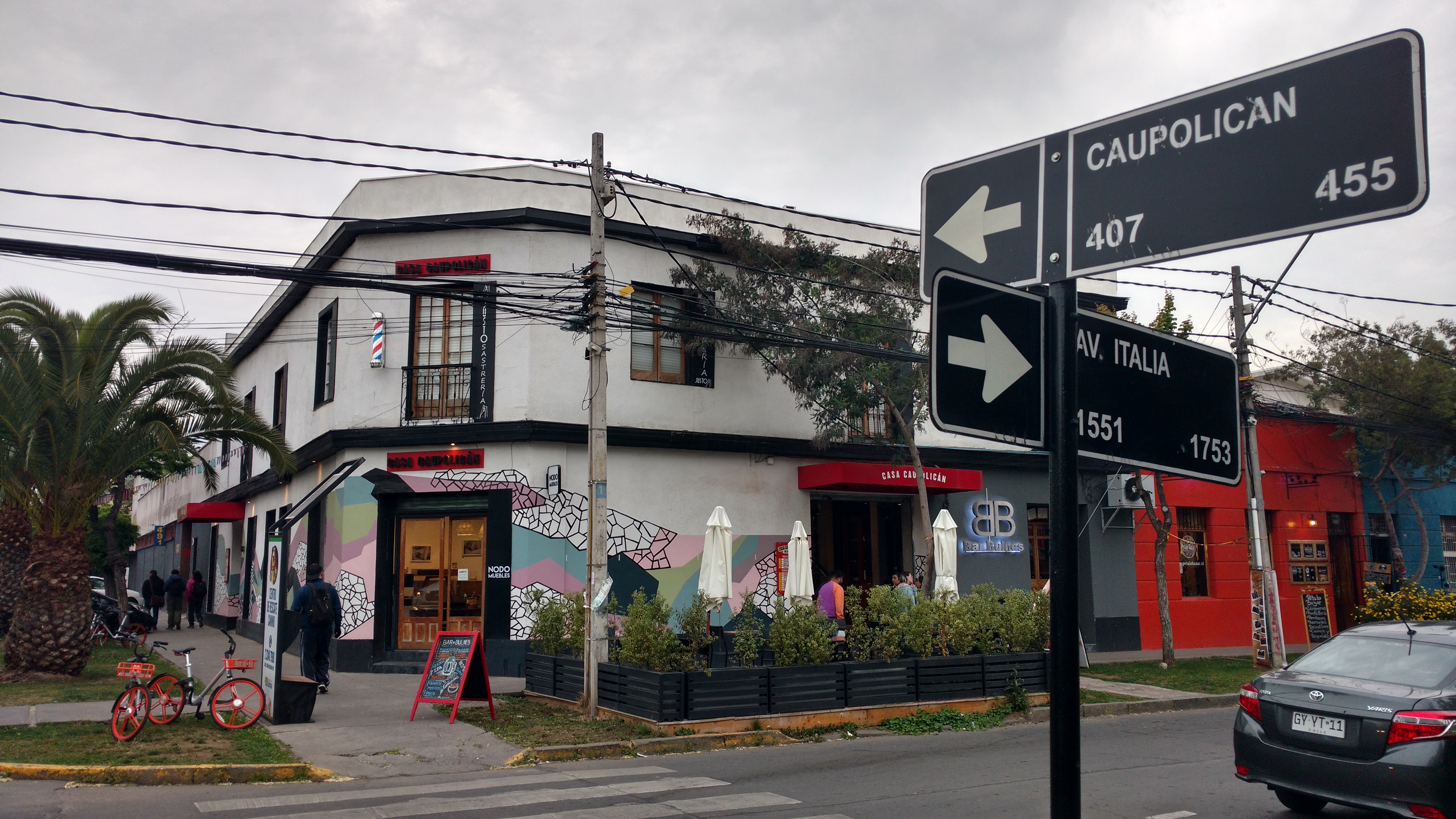
Casa Caupolicán in Barrio Italia

In terms of landmarks, Ñuñoa is home to several notable sites. It is the location of Santiago's only mosque and is also home to Chile's largest sports complex and national stadium, Estadio Nacional. Additionally, Ñuñoa features two bohemian neighborhoods: Plaza Ñuñoa and Barrio Italia, with the latter being shared with the Providencia commune.

== Education ==
Private schools:

- Colegio Suizo de Santiago
- Kendal English School
- Colegio Akros
- Escuela Amaranta Gómez Regalado, founded in donated space in a community center.
- Colegio Francisco Encina
- Liceo Experimental Manuel de Salas

Public schools:

- Colegio República de Costa Rica

== Notable people ==
- Soledad Alvear, senator
- Gutenberg Martínez, politician
- Jorge Arrate, politician
- José Balmes, painter
- Fanny Pollarolo, former deputy
- Mercedes Valdivieso, writer
- José Miguel Varas, journalist
- Fernando Villegas, writer and political commentator
- José Luis Rosasco, writer
- Poli Délano, writer
