= Amaranta Gómez Regalado =

Mexican muxe anthropologist

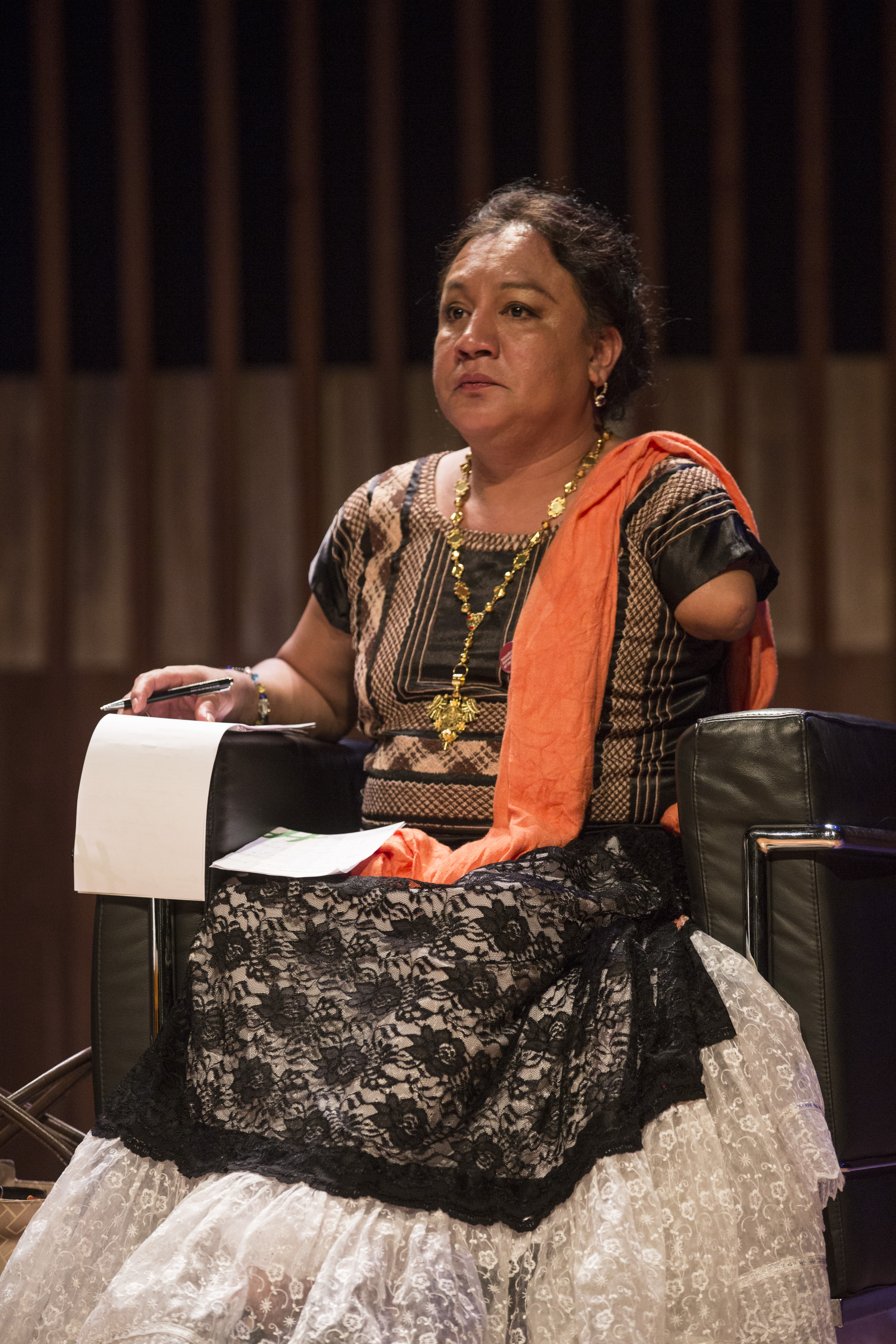
- Regalado in 2020
- Born: 1977 (age 48–49); Juchitán de Zaragoza, Istmo de Tehuantepec, Mexico
- Education: Universidad Veracruzana
- Occupations: Anthropologist and human rights activist
- Political party: México Posible

Amaranta Gómez Regalado (born 1977) is a Mexican Muxe social anthropologist, political candidate, HIV prevention activist, social researcher, columnist and promoter of pre-Columbian indigenous cultural identity.

== Biography ==
Gómez was born in 1977 in a Zapotec village close to the border of Guatemala and adopted the name of Amaranta during adolescence, after reading One Hundred Years of Solitude, the famous work of Colombian writer Gabriel García Márquez.

During high school, Gómez Regalado studied languages and theater in Veracruz. She then traveled to several states in southern Mexico as part of a transvestism show.

In October 2002, a car accident fractured her left arm to such an extent that it had to be amputated.

In 2015 she managed to change her gender identity on her birth certificate, which allowed her to change other official documents such as a passport. This was possible from the reforms approved by what was once the Legislative Assembly of Mexico City to allow people to legally change their gender identity in their birth certificate, through only an administrative procedure. (See LGBT rights in Mexico#Gender identity and expression.)

She studied social anthropology at the University of Veracruz between 2011 and 2016. Her undergraduate thesis was titled Guendaranaxhii: the Muxe community of the Isthmus of Tehuantepec and the emotional erotic relations.

== Activism ==
At the age of 25, she gained international prominence as a candidate for the México Posible party in the 2003 elections to the Federal Congress. Her broad platform included calls for the decriminalization of marijuana and abortion. Regalado did not win a seat.

== Recognition ==
The Escuela Amaranta Gómez Regalado in Santiago, Chile is named for her.
