= Escuela Amaranta Gómez Regalado =

- Ñuñoa, Santiago; Chile

Information
- Type: private school for transgender students
- Established: April 2018
- Head teacher: Evelyn Silva
- Age range: 6–17
- Enrollment: 38 (May 2019)
- Campus type: urban

Escuela Amaranta Gómez Regalado or Amaranta School is a private school in Santiago, Chile for transgender students from 6 to 17 years old. It is named for Amaranta Gómez Regalado, a transgender Mexican politician, and is the first primarily transgender school in Latin America, possibly the world.

First proposed in December 2017, the school was opened in April 2018 by Ximena Matura, the school coordinator, and Evelyn Silva, its head, who is the president of the Selenna Foundation, a trans rights organization. Housed in space in a community center donated by the community of Ñuñoa, as of May 2019 enrollment is 38, 22 or 23 are trans and the remainder mostly friends and relatives. The students report having been bullied, and most had previously dropped out of school. Chile bans the teaching or discussion of "gender ideology" in state-funded schools, but the country passed a gender identity law allowing those 14 or older to change the gender on their identity documents, with parental permission required for those under 18.

The school has two classrooms, for students under 12 and for those aged 12 to 17. As of May 2019, teachers were working without pay, and Maturano and Silva paid all other costs for the first year, but monthly fees were proposed to begin in March. A summer program started in 2019 had 20 participants, 8 not previously enrolled, and the school hopes to win a competition grant of $20,000 from an international trans fund in order to expand. Students must take tests provided by the Ministry of Education to certify that they have passed a grade level.

The school is named for Amaranta Gómez Regalado, a Zapotec Mexican trans activist and politician who identifies as a muxe. It is nicknamed les niñes, the Spanish gender-neutral form of "the children".
