= Colegio Suizo de Santiago =

Swiss international school in Chile

Coordinates: 33.4565°S 70.6082°W

- German: Schweizer Schule Santiago

Information
- School type: International school
- Established: 1939; 87 years ago

Colegio Suizo de Santiago (German: Schweizer Schule Santiago) is a Swiss international school in Ñuñoa, Santiago de Chile. It serves students from preschool (Vorkindergarten) through senior high school (Sekundarstufe II).

It was founded in 1939.
