= Chilean Brazilians =

Ethnic group in Brazil

Chileno-brasileiros · Chileno-brasileños
- (Chile) (Brazil)

Total population
- 150,000 Chilean Brazilians

Regions with significant populations
- Brazil: Mainly Southeastern Brazil

Languages
- Brazilian Portuguese · Chilean Spanish

Religion
- Predominantly Roman Catholicism

Related ethnic groups
- other Brazilian and Chilean people, other Latin Americans

Chilean Brazilians (Portuguese: Chileno-brasileiros, Spanish: Chileno-brasileños) are Brazilian citizens of full, partial, or predominantly Chilean ancestry or Chile-born people who reside in Brazil.

Emigration of Chileans has decreased during the last decade: It is estimated that 857,781 Chileans live abroad, 50.1% of those being in Argentina (the highest number), 13.3% in Brazil and 8.8% in the United States.

== Notable Chilean Brazilians ==
- José Agüero, tennis player
- Adriana Prieto, Argentine-born actress
- Mauricio Viana, Brazilian-born Chilean footballer
- Joe Vasconcellos, Chilean-born singer

== See also ==
- Brazil–Chile relations
- Immigration to Brazil
- Chilean people
- Spanish immigration to Brazil
