= Santiago (commune) =

- Commune
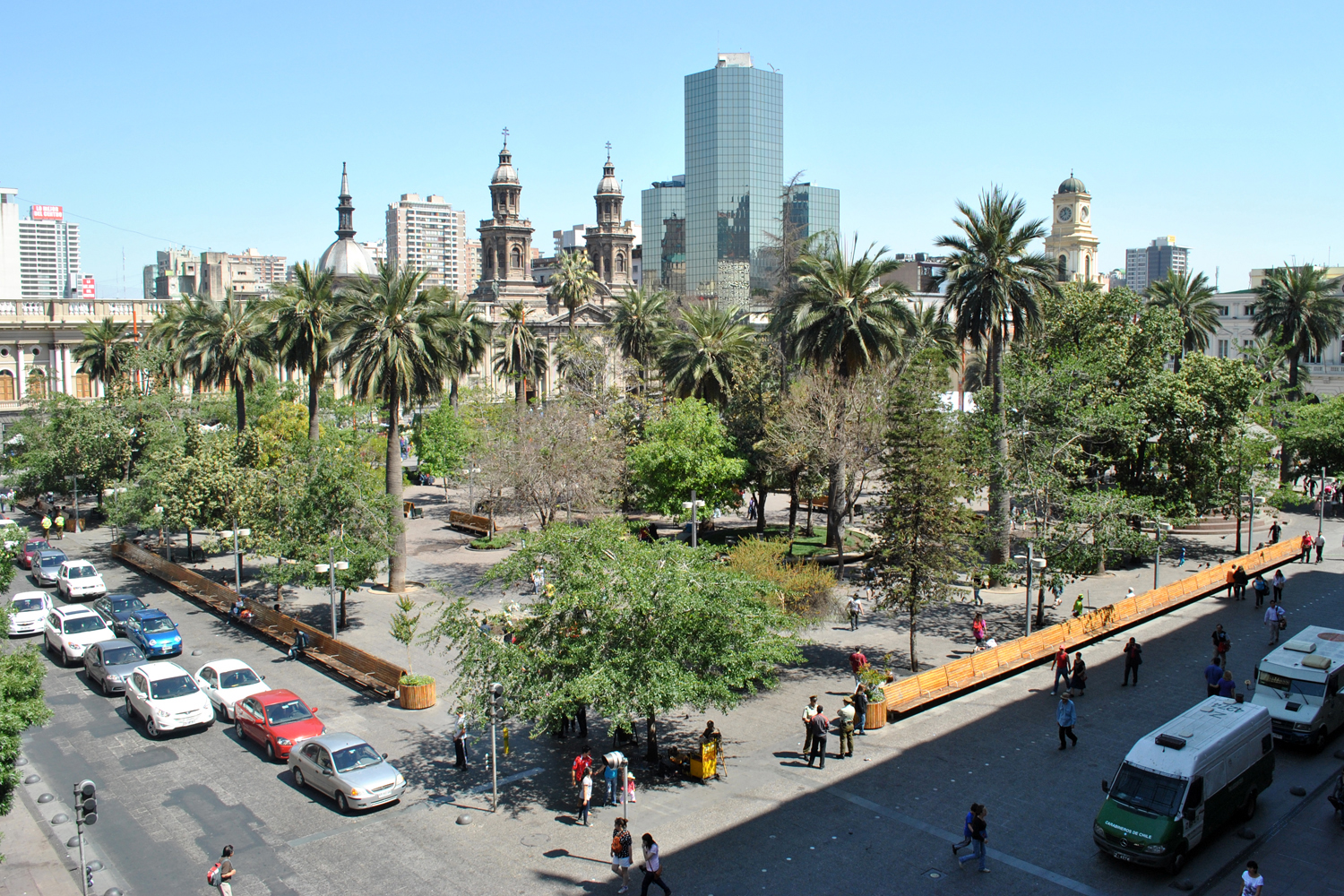
- Plaza de Armas de Santiago

- Flag Coat of arms Location in Chile
- Interactive map of Santiago
- Coordinates (city): 33°26′14″S 70°39′02″W
- Country: Chile
- Region: Santiago Metropolitan
- Province: Santiago
- Established: 12 February 1541

Government
  - Type: Commune
  - Mayor: Mario Desbordes (Ind.)

Area
  - Total: 22.4 km^{2} (8.6 sq mi)
- Elevation: 579 m (1,900 ft)

Population (2024)
  - Total: 438,856
  - Rank: 3rd in Chile
  - Density: 19,600/km^{2} (50,700/sq mi)
  - Urban: 438,856
  - Rural: 0
- Time zone: UTC-4 (CLT)
  - Summer (DST): UTC-3 (CLST)
- Website: Municipality of Santiago

The Commune of Santiago is the central commune of the Santiago Province, located at the center of the Santiago Metropolitan Region in Chile's Central Zone. Locally, Santiago is usually abbreviated Stgo. It is also called as "Santiago Centro" (Central Santiago or Downtown Santiago) in order to differentiate it from Greater Santiago, a larger entity which includes the Santiago commune along with 36 other communes. With a population of 438,856, it is the 3rd-largest commune in Chile.

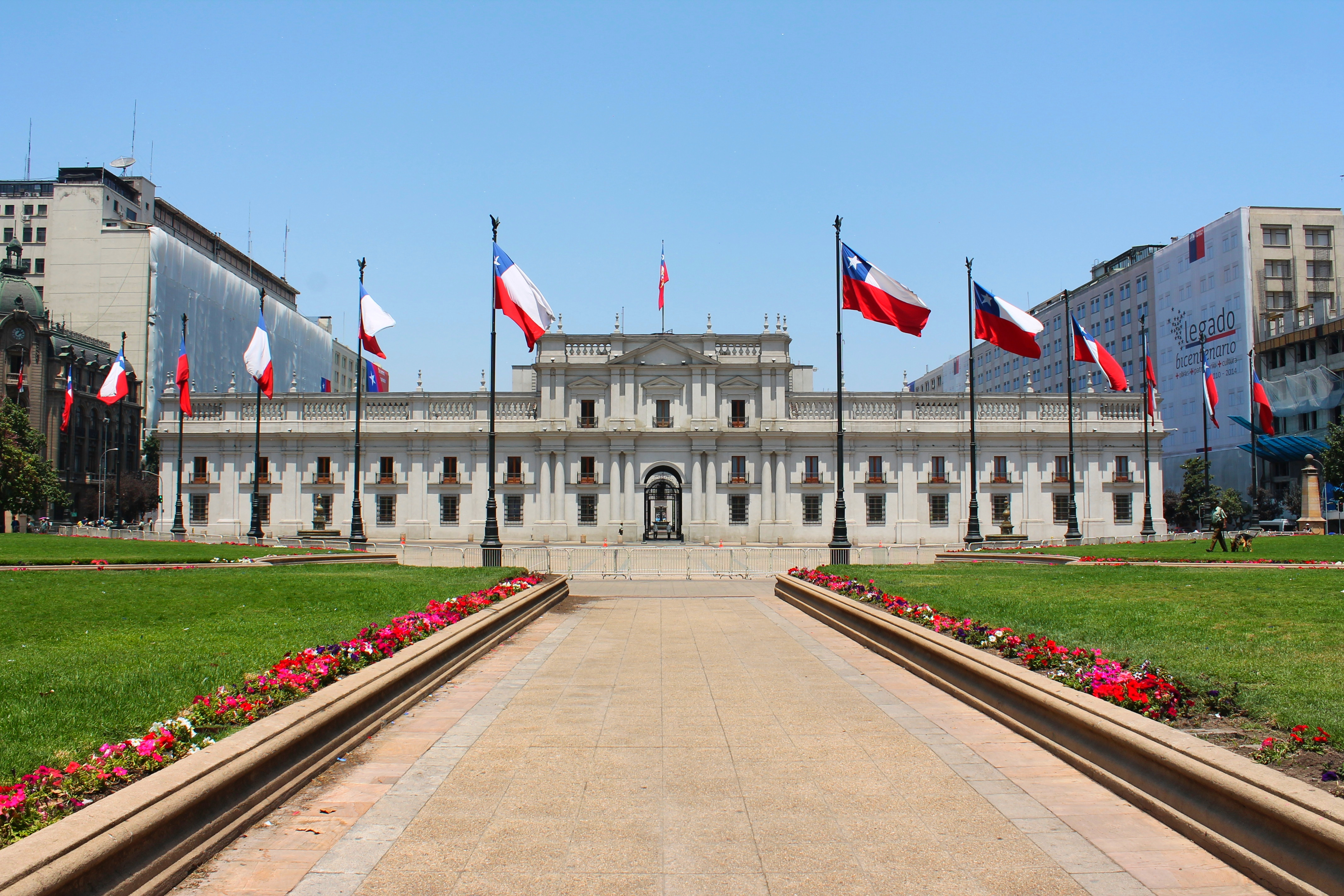
Palacio La Moneda.

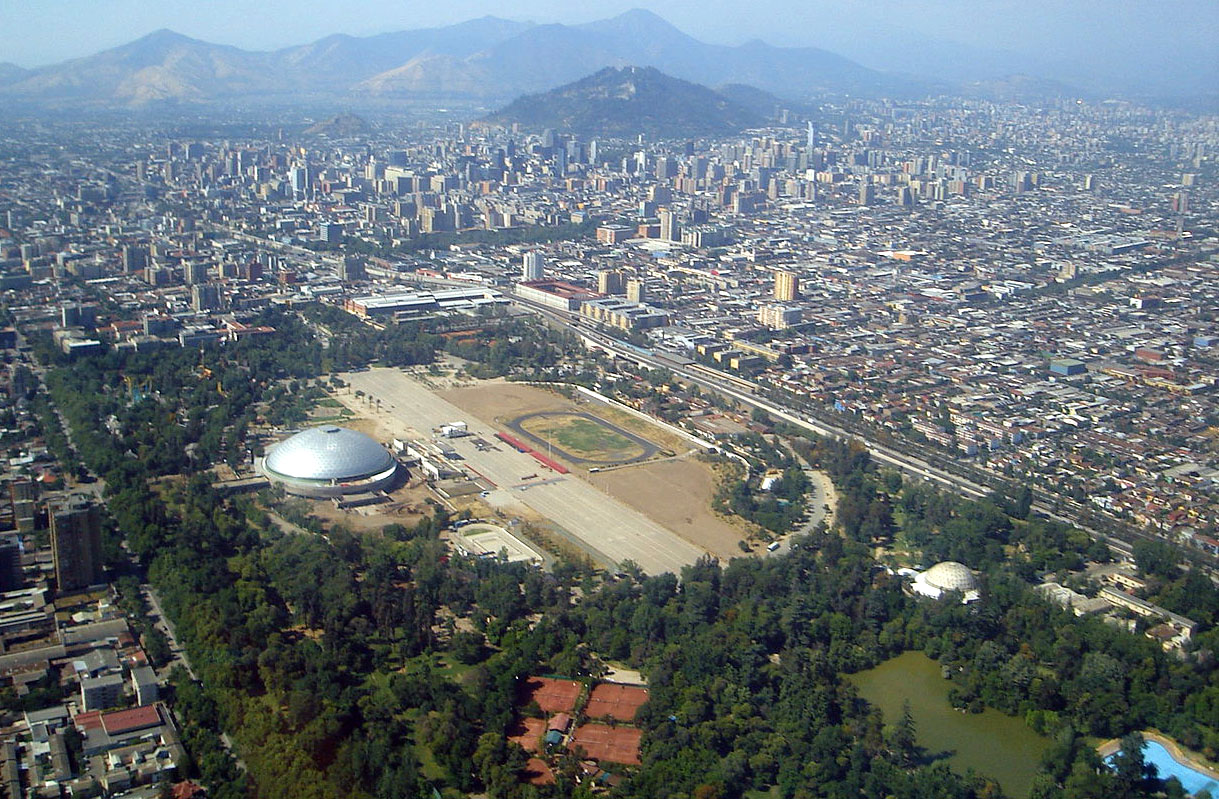
O'Higgins Park and panoramic view

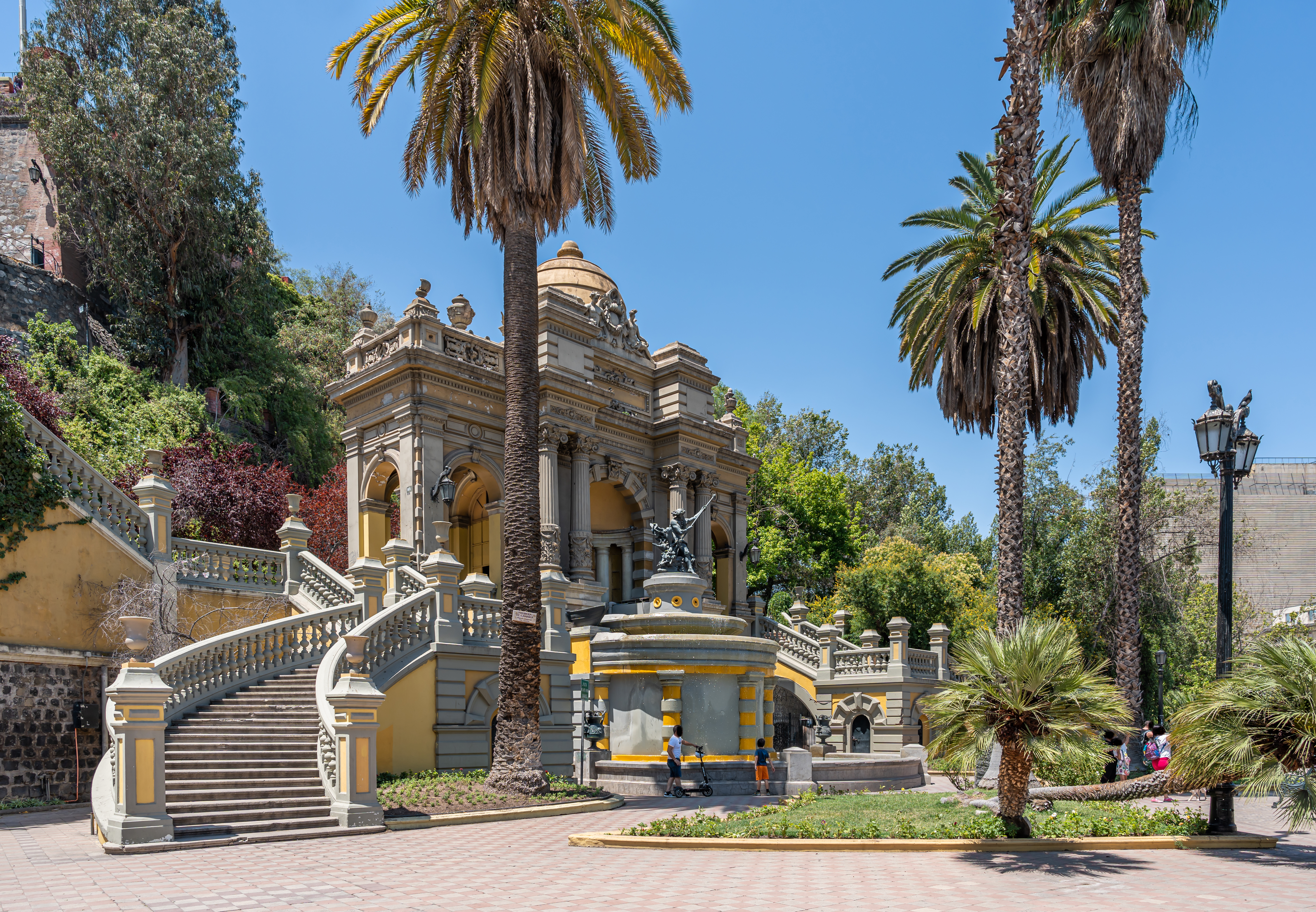
Santa Lucía Hill

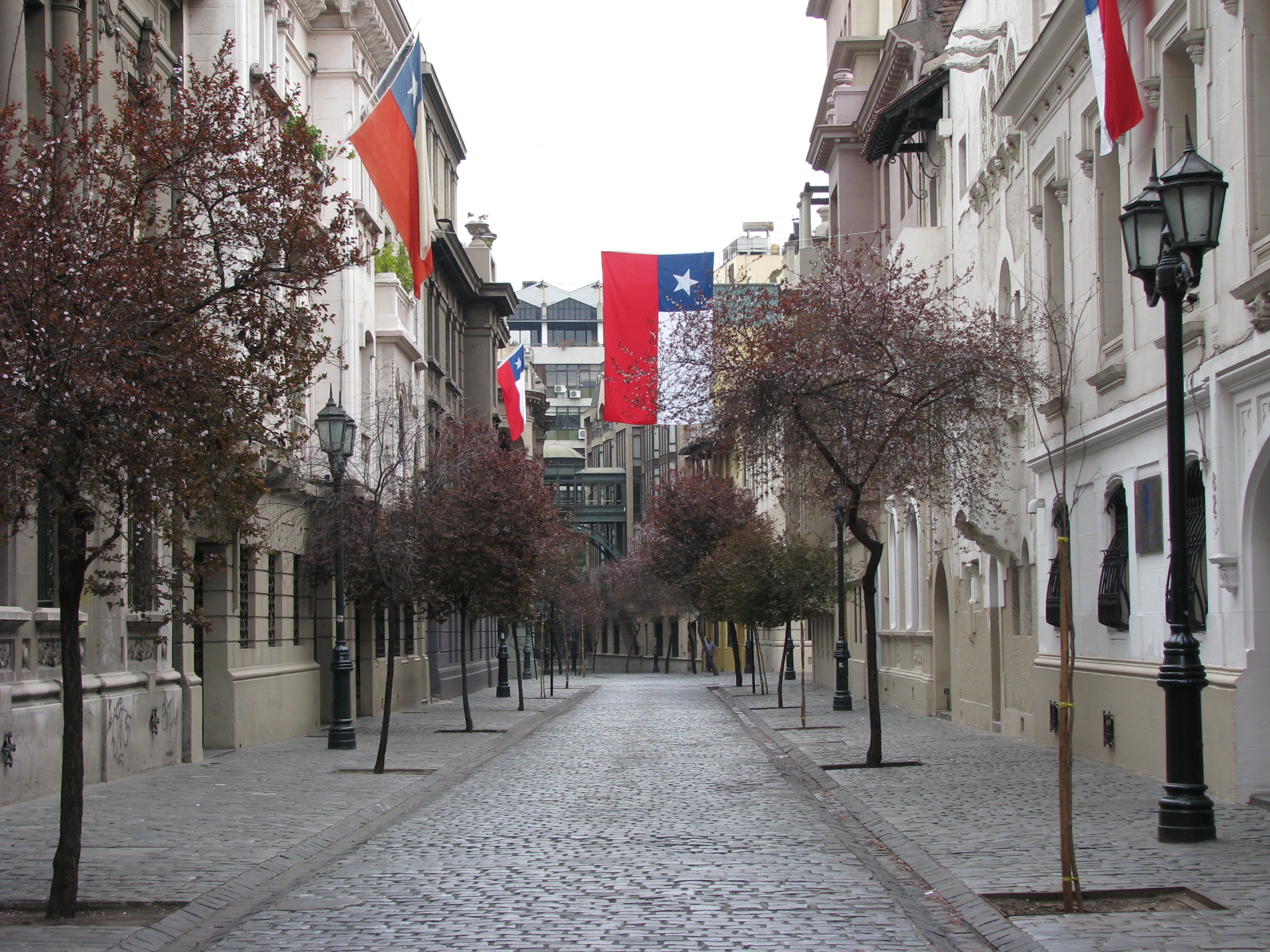
Barrio París-Londres.

== History ==
At the time of its founding in 1541, the territory corresponding to the city of Santiago was completely contained in what is now known as the commune of Santiago, so it is common to affirm that the founding date of the commune of Santiago is the same as that of the city, although the term "commune" began to be used many years later when the city far exceeded its original limits. Thus, the commune of Santiago shares its history with the first decades of the city of the same name, encompassing the oldest part of the city — that enclosed by old rail lines — including downtown, and houses all major government infrastructure, including the government palace La Moneda.

== Administration ==
As a commune, Santiago is a third-level administrative division of Chile administered by a municipal council, headed by a mayor who is directly elected every four years. For the 2024-2028 term, the mayor is Mario Desbordes Jiménez (Ind.), and the communal council has the following members:

- Luis Mackenna Irarrázaval (UDI)
- Vicente Martínez Álvarez (REP)
- Carolina Prieto Núñez (REP)
- Dafne Concha Ferrando (PC)
- Camila Davagnino Reyes (PC)
- Ana Yáñez Varas (FA)
- Juan Mena Echeverría (RN)
- Santiago Mekis Arnolds (RN)
- María José Ramírez Calquin (RN)
- Claudia Ramírez Martínez (PAVP)

Within the electoral divisions of Chile, Santiago is represented in the Chamber of Deputies by José Antonio Kast Adriasola (REP), Hans Marowski (PNL), Jorge Alessandri Vergara (UDI), Francisco Orrego (RN), Gonzalo Winter (FA), Lorena Fries (FA), Irací Hassler (PC), and Emilia Schneider (FA) as part of the 10th electoral district. The commune is represented in the Senate by Fabiola Campillai Rojas (Ind.), Claudia Pascual (PC), Luciano Cruz Coke (Ind.), Manuel José Ossandon (RN) and Rojo Edwards (Ind.) as part of the 7th senatorial constituency (Santiago Metropolitan Region).

== Demographics ==
As of the 2024 census, the commune has a population of 438,856, of which 50.9% are male and 49.1% are female. People under 15 years old make up 12.7% of the population, and people over 65 years old make up 8.1%. 100% of the population is urban.

Historical population
Year	Pop.	±% p.a.
1970	289,877	—
1982	232,667	−1.82%
1992	230,977	−0.07%
2002	200,792	−1.39%
2017	404,495	+4.78%
2024	438,856	+1.17%
Source: INE, Memoria Chilena

=== Ethnic minorities ===
As of the 2024 census, Indigenous peoples make up 5.5% of the population, and Afro-Chileans make up 3.2%.

=== Religion ===
As of the 2024 census, 64.6% of the population over 15 years old are Christians (51.1% Catholics, 9.8% Evangelicals or Protestants, and 3.8% other branches), 0.2% are Jews, 0.1% are Muslims, 0.4% are Buddhists, 0.1% are Hinduists, 0.9% are adrehents of other religions, and 33.6% are irreligious.

=== Immigration ===
As of the 2024 census, immigrants make up 40.3% of the population - 37.7% are from South America, 1.5% from North America, 0.3% from Europe, 0.8% from Asia, 0.03% from Africa, and 0.01% from Oceania.

== International relations ==
The commune of Santiago is home to a number of international relations institutions, such as the Regional Unit for International Affairs (URAI) of the Regional Government of Santiago Metropolitan Region, responsible for the analysis and management of the bilateral and multilateral relations of the Santiago Metropolitan Region with Latin America and the rest of the world; the International Cooperation Commission of the Metropolitan Regional Council of Santiago; the Ministry of Foreign Affairs of Chile; the Directorate of International Relations of the Chilean Army; as well as various International Relations Offices (ORI) within political and sectoral ministries. The Municipality of Santiago also maintains an International Relations Office.

=== International trade and investment ===
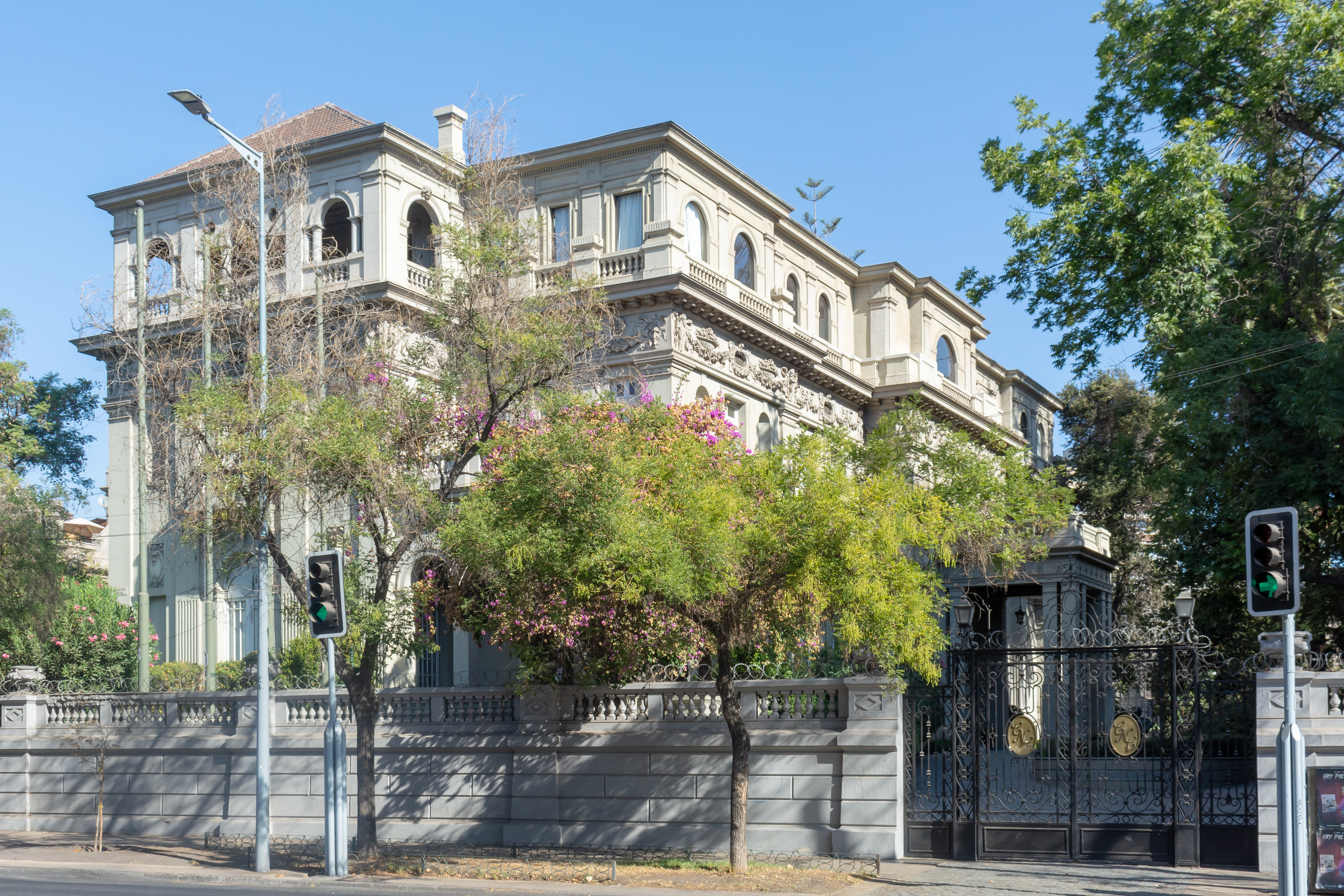
Chilean–Dutch Chamber of Commerce (Holland House).

In the field of international trade and investment, the principal actors within the commune of Santiago are the Undersecretariat of International Economic Relations, the Directorate General for Export Promotion, the Foreign Investment Promotion Agency (InvestChile), and the Chilean–Dutch Chamber of Commerce (Holland House).

=== Migration management ===
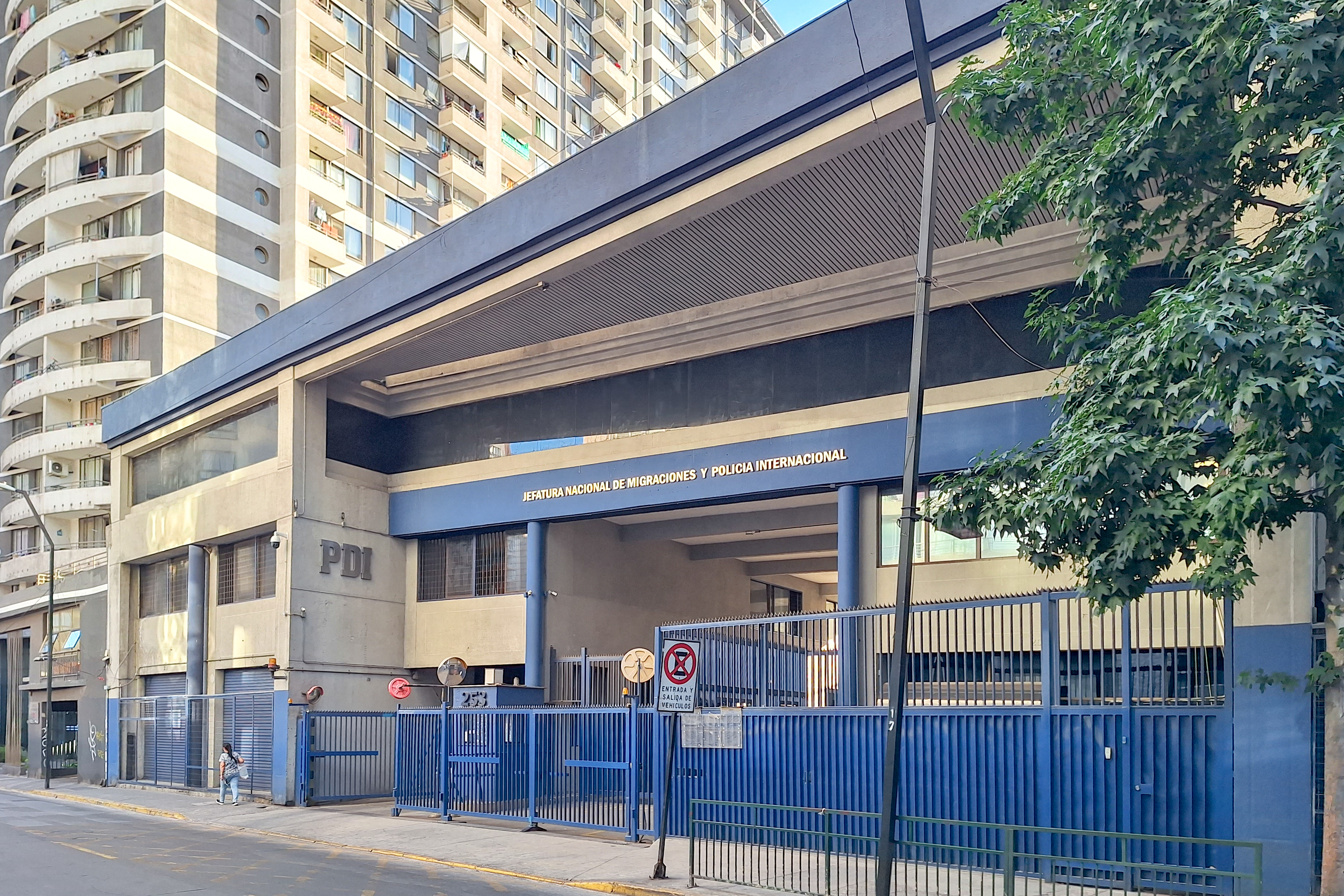
National Headquarters for Migration and International Police of the Investigations Police of Chile (PDI).

In the field of international relations and migration management, the principal actors within downtown Santiago are the National Migration Service, the National Headquarters for Migration and International Police of the Investigations Police of Chile, and the Migrant Office of the Municipality of Santiago.

=== Internationalization in higher education ===
In the field of international relations and higher education, the principal actors within the commune of Santiago are the Vice Rectorate for International Affairs and the Center for International Studies of the Pontifical Catholic University of Chile, the Directorate of International Relations of the University of Chile, the General Directorate of International Relations of the Diego Portales University, the Directorate of International Relations, the Center for International Policy Studies, and the King Sejong Institute of the Central University of Chile, the Directorate of International Cooperation of the Alberto Hurtado University, the Unit for International Cooperation and Internationalization of the Silva Henríquez Catholic University, the Directorate of Internationalization of the Bernardo O'Higgins University, and the Coordination of International Relations of the Universidad del Alba.

=== International cooperation and cultural diplomacy ===
In the field of international cooperation, the principal actors within downtown Santiago are the Chilean Agency for International Development Cooperation, and the national and Southern Cone office of the International Institute for Democracy and Electoral Assistance (International IDEA). In addition, downtown Santiago is characterized as the national headquarters of binational cultural and educational institutions, such as the Chilean-British Institute of Culture, the Chilean-North American Institute, the Chilean-Swiss Institute of Language and Culture, the Russian House in Chile, the Regional Center of Confucius Institutes for Latin America, and the Guimarães Rosa Institute Santiago.

=== Embassies ===
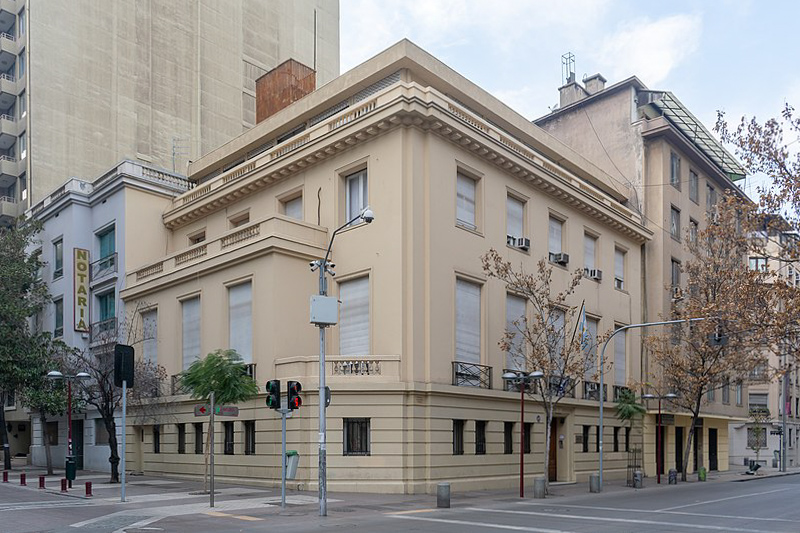
Embassy of Argentina in downtown Santiago.

- Argentina (Embassy and Consulate-General)
- Haiti (Embassy)
- Paraguay (Consulate-General)
