= Griselda Hinojosa =

Chilean pharmacist

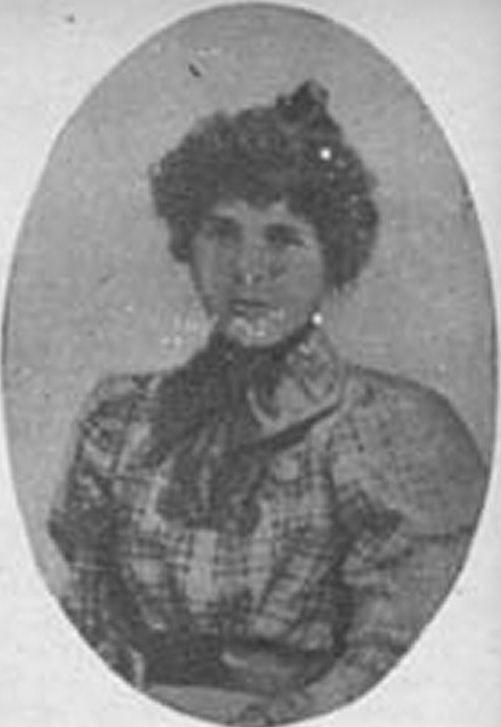
- Griselda Hinojosa in 1899
- Born: María Griselda Hinojosa Flores; 20 April 1875; Copiapó, Chile
- Died: 1959 (aged 83–84)
- Education: University of Chile
- Occupation: Pharmacist

María Griselda Hinojosa Flores (20 April 1875 – 1959) was a Chilean pharmacist. She became the first woman to practice pharmacy in the country after earning a degree from the University of Chile in 1899.

== Biography ==
Griselda Hinojosa was born in Copiapó on 20 April 1875, the fourth daughter of Pablo Hinojosa and Mercedes Flores. She studied at the Rafael Valdés Private School for Girls and at the Copiapó Lyceum for Girls.

She studied pharmacy at the University of Chile, graduating on 4 December 1899 with the thesis Contribución al estudio del Solanum Tomatillo (Natri) (Contribution to the Study of the Solanum Tomatillo). She was part of the first group of women to earn college degrees in Chile, following the promulgation of the Decreto Amunátegui in 1877; others included physicians Eloisa Diaz (1886) and Ernestina Pérez (1887) and lawyers Matilde Throup (1892) and Matilde Brandau (1898).

She practiced her profession at the Copiapó Apothecary and Drugstore until 1909, and at the Manuel Antonio Matta Pharmacy, located on the homonymous avenue in Santiago, owned by Hinojosa and her husband.
