= Francisco Aboitiz =

Chilean neuroscientist, academic, and author

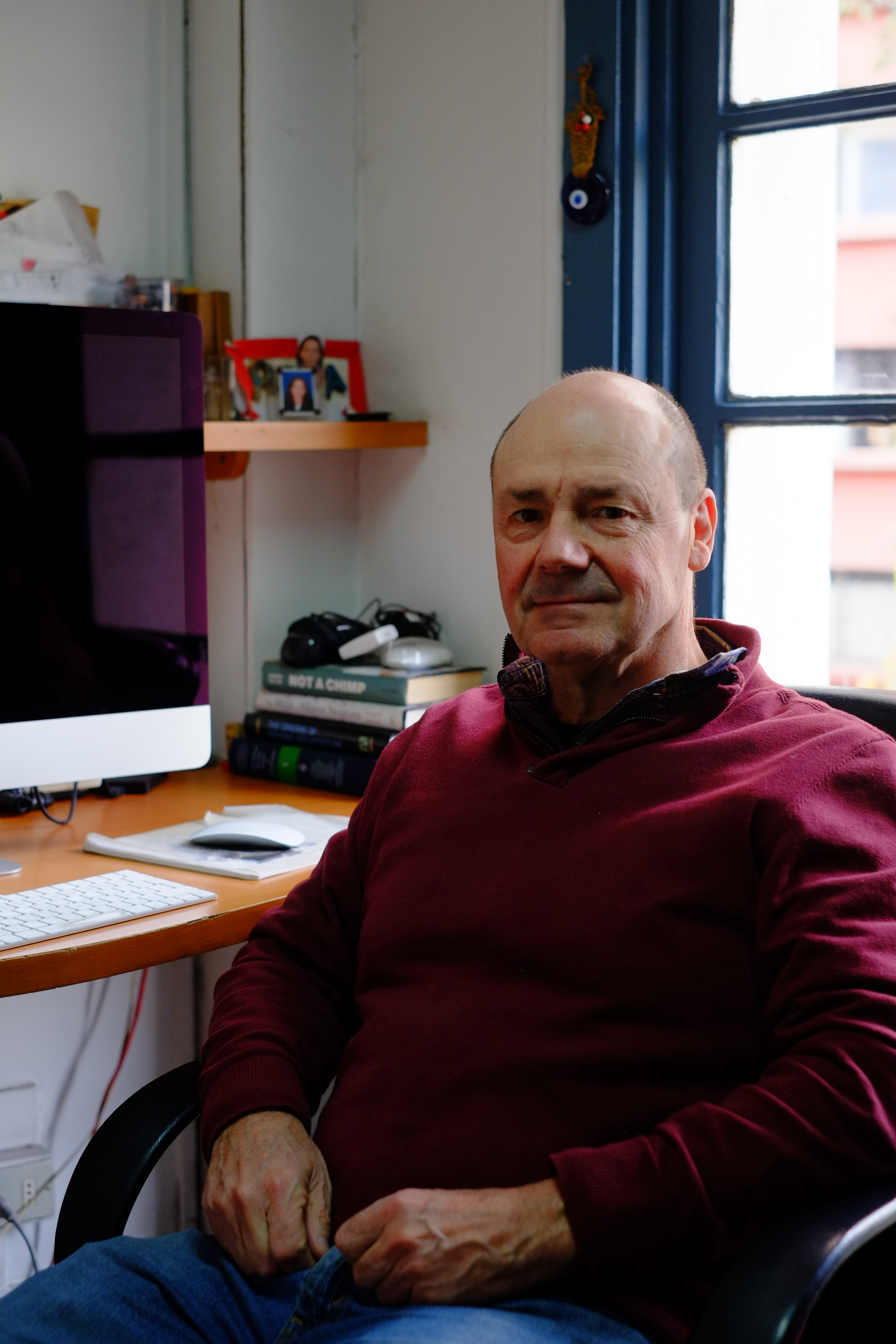
- Born: Francisco Javier Aboitiz Dominguez
- Occupations: Neuroscientist, author and academic

Academic background
- Education: Licenciatura En Biología, Universidad de Chile; PhD in Neuroscience, University of California, Los Angeles

Francisco Aboitiz is a Chilean neuroscientist, academic, and author. He is a professor at the Medical School and the Director of the Interdisciplinary Center for Neuroscience NeuroUC at Pontificia Universidad Católica (PUC) de Chile.

Aboitiz's research spans comparative neuroanatomy, focusing on interhemispheric connections and brain asymmetries, the evolution of the cerebral cortex and language networks, cognitive functions in neuropsychiatric conditions (including ADHD, ASD, and schizophrenia) mainly using high-density EEG and brain imaging, and cognitive mechanisms studied through intracranial recordings in epilepsy patients. He has authored and edited more than 140 scientific articles and several books including From Attention to Goal-Directed Behavior: Neurodynamical, methodological and clinical trends, coauthored with Diego Cosmelli, and A Brain for Speech: A view from Evolutionary Neuroanatomy. His forthcoming book, A History of Bodies, Brains and Minds. The evolution of life and consciousness, is to be published in September 2024.

== Education ==
Aboitiz pursued higher education at the Universidad de Chile (UCh), earning a Licenciatura en Biología in 1983, with professors Humberto Maturana and Francisco Varela. Following this, he continued his studies and obtained a PhD in neuroscience from the University of California, Los Angeles (UCLA) in 1991, tutored by Eran Zaidel and Arnold Scheibel.

== Career ==
Aboitiz's career started as a Research Fellow at the Beth Israel Hospital of Harvard Medical School, working in Norman Geschwind's and Albert Galaburda's laboratory, from 1983 to 1985, studying the neurological bases of language and developmental dyslexia. From 1985 to 1991, he pursued his PhD at UCLA. Then, he held a postdoctoral position at Robin Fisher's laboratory at the Mental Retardation Research Center of UCLA, from 1991 to 1992. After this, he returned to Chile and served as a professor at the Medical School of Universidad de Chile (UCh) from 1992 until 2002, where he became director of the Morphology Department at the Institute for Biomedical Sciences of the Medical School at UCh. Since 2002, he has been appointed as a professor at the Psychiatry Department of the Medical School of the Pontificia Universidad Católica de Chile (PUC).

Between 2002 and 2006, Aboitiz participated as sub-director of the Millennium Center for Integrative Neuroscience, CENI, under the Millennium Scientific Initiative Program (ICM) promoted by the Chilean government. In 2009, he created and has been the current director of the Interdisciplinary Center for Neuroscience NeuroUC.

In 2010, Aboitiz developed the Neuroscience PhD Program at PUC. In 2011, he was awarded as Director of the Center for the Neuroscience of Memory, CENEM, one of the seven new Millennium Scientific Nuclei. He holds the position of the Principal Investigator at the Laboratorio de Neurociencia Cognitiva y Evolutiva (LANCE), where he has directed more than 20 PhD theses.

== Research ==
Initially in his career, Aboitiz focused on the comparative neuroanatomy of interhemispheric connections and brain asymmetries in humans and other mammals. He also investigated the cerebral cortex's origins in early mammals, proposing hypotheses that challenged established views that considered the mammalian cerebral cortex as a derivative of an ancestral reptilian-like brain. He suggested that the brains of reptiles and mammals underwent separate evolutionary histories, while also exploring the neuroanatomy of language networks, identifying their potential homologues in monkeys and suggesting a framework for human language circuits' evolution. In addition to this, his work in medical faculties has involved studying cognitive functions in various neuropsychiatric conditions, such as ADHD, autism spectrum disorder (ASD), and schizophrenia, as well as language processing and social behavior in healthy individuals.

In one of his highly cited studies, Aboitiz contributed to a study of four brains of men with developmental dyslexia. The neuroanatomical findings showed that men with developmental dyslexia had developmental anomalies in the cerebral cortex, deviations from standard cerebral asymmetry, and associations with non-right handedness and autoimmune illnesses. His PhD thesis described the regional differentiation in fiber types within the human corpus callosum, finding patterns of density variation, no significant sex differences, and no correlation between overall fiber density and callosal area. Later, he proposed a hypothesis for the evolutionary development of the corpus callosum, highlighting how its fiber structure facilitates interhemispheric communication, particularly in sensory areas, and how brain size impacts this connectivity, potentially influencing brain lateralization.

Aboitiz has also led a research line concerning the cognitive mechanisms involved in the pathology of neuropsychiatric conditions, especially ADHD, and has used new neurotechnologies for scientific research, including high-density electroencephalography (EEG), neuroimaging (MRI and fMRI) and intracranial electrophysiological recordings in humans (ECoG). Additionally, he proposed a theory for the evolutionary origin of the mammalian cerebral cortex from an undifferentiated brain as is observed in amphibians, depicting homology (but not ancestry) with the dorsal and lateral pallium of reptiles, and proposing a mechanism for the evolution of its laminated structure. A further line of research concerned the neural substrate for language and its gradual origin through natural selection, involving a large-scale neurocognitive network across temporal, parietal, and frontal cortices, which amplified vocal working memory capacity, facilitating to learn complex vocalizations and syntax development.

=== Works ===
Aboitiz has authored and edited more than 140 scientific papers and several books throughout his career. He co-authored his first book in 2007, Origin and Evolution of the Vertebrate Telencephalon, with Special Reference to the Mammalian Neocortex, with Juan Montiel in 2007, exploring the origin and evolution of the vertebrate brain, tracing its development from the simplest nervous system elements to the complex mammalian cerebral cortex, while also addressing the debate between evolutionary biology and intelligent design regarding the complexity of the brain. Collaborating with Diego Cosmelli in 2008, he explored the fundamental links between attention, goal-directed behavior, and cognitive control in his book Attention to Goal-Directed Behavior: Neurodynamical, Methodological and Clinical Trends, emphasizing an ecological approach to understanding these processes in natural behavior. Among his edited works, his Spanish book, Déficit atencional e hiperactividad: Fronteras y desafíos (Attention Deficit and Hyperactivity: Borders and Challenges), published in 2011, looked into the controversies and misunderstandings surrounding ADHD and underscored its genetic basis, lifelong impact, and the necessity for an integrated treatment approach, focusing on the recent scientific and clinical advancements and therapeutic strategies.

In 2017, Aboitiz's work A Brain for Speech: A View from Evolutionary Neuroanatomy, investigated the evolution of the human brain and the origins of speech and language, emphasizing the role of the phonological loop in developing vocal memory and modern language and examining related neuroanatomy and learning capacities in other species. David Poeppel commented that (this book) "provides a provocative angle on how the domains gesture, speech and working memory interact in the evolution of speech". During a presentation ceremony, Jorge Barros remarked, "Reading this book, I understood two things: first, that it was not a typical neuroscience text because it was unusual; and second, that this book was not written in a year... The book summarizes the scientific work of his entire life."

Aboitiz has worked on his latest book, A History of Bodies, Brains and Minds. The evolution of life and consciousness, to be published in September 2024. This book attempts to provide a perspective of the evolution of life on earth, from life's origin to the appearance of language and human consciousness.

== Bibliography ==
=== Books ===
- Origin and Evolution of the Vertebrate Telencephalon, with Special Reference to the Mammalian Neocortex (2007) ISBN 978-3540497608
- From Attention to Goal-Directed Behavior: Neurodynamical, Methodological and Clinical Trends (2008) ISBN 978-3540705727
- Déficit atencional e hiperactividad: Fronteras y desafíos (2011) ISBN 978-9561410886
- A Brain for Speech: A View from Evolutionary Neuroanatomy (2017) ISBN 9781137540607
- A History of Bodies, Brains, and Minds: The Evolution of Life and Consciousness (2024) ISBN 9780262049023

=== Selected articles ===
- Galaburda, A. M., Sherman, G. F., Rosen, G. D., Aboitiz, F., & Geschwind, N. (1985). Developmental dyslexia: four consecutive patients with cortical anomalies. Annals of Neurology: Official Journal of the American Neurological Association and the Child Neurology Society, 18(2), 222–233.
- Aboitiz, F., Scheibel, A. B., Fisher, R. S., & Zaidel, E. (1992). Fiber composition of the human corpus callosum. Brain research, 598(1–2), 143–153.
- Aboitiz, F., Scheibel, A. B., Fisher, R. S., & Zaidel, E. (1992). Individual differences in brain asymmetries and fiber composition in the human corpus callosum. Brain research, 598(1–2), 154–161.
- Aboitiz, F., & Garcıa, R. (1997). The evolutionary origin of the language areas in the human brain. A neuroanatomical perspective. Brain Research Reviews, 25(3), 381–396.
- Aboitiz, F., & Montiel, J. (2003). One hundred million years of interhemispheric communication: the history of the corpus callosum. Brazilian journal of medical and biological research, 36, 409–420.
- Aboitiz, F., Morales, D., & Montiel, J. (2003). The evolutionary origin of the mammalian isocortex: towards an integrated developmental and functional approach. Behavioral and Brain Sciences, 26(5), 535–552.
- Montiel, J. F., & Aboitiz, F. (2015). Pallial patterning and the origin of the isocortex. Frontiers in Neuroscience, 9, 377.
