= Aron Mosnaim =

Neuroscientist

Aron David Mosnaim
- Occupations: Neuroscientist, researcher, and academic

Academic background
- Education: PharmD degree PhD in Organic Chemistry
- Alma mater: University of Chile; University of Strathclyde

Aron David Mosnaim is a neuroscientist, researcher, and academic. He is an emeritus professor of Cellular and Molecular Pharmacology and an emeritus adjunct professor of Psychiatry and Behavioral Sciences in the Chicago Medical School at Rosalind Franklin University of Medicine and Science.

Mosnaim is most known for his research covering the areas of basic and clinical neuro- and immunopharmacology of biogenic amines and opioid peptides in neuropsychiatric conditions, including depression, headache pain, as well as movement and post-traumatic stress disorders. He has co-edited four scientific books on Noncatecholic Phenylethylamines (2 volumes), Posttraumatic Stress Disorder, and Tardive Dyskinesia.

Mosnaim has served as a Consultant to the Pan American Health Organization (1982–1985), Member of the United States Pharmacopeia Convention (1990 and 1995), and Director of International Neuropsychiatry Consultants (1987–2020). Additionally, he is a Fellow of The Chemical Society (1977) and a Senior Fellow of the American Institute of Therapeutics (2019).

== Early life and education ==
Mosnaim earned a Doctor of Pharmaceutical Sciences degree from the University of Chile (1964) and joined the Faculty of the university's School of Medicine. He was awarded a PhD degree in Organic Chemistry from Glasgow’s Strathclyde University (1969). After a brief tenure at the University of Chicago, he received a postdoctoral fellowship at Northwestern University (1970).

== Career ==
In 1971, Mosnaim joined the University of Health Sciences/The Chicago Medical School as an assistant professor in the Department of Pharmacology. He was promoted to Associate Professor and Acting Chairman (1974), and to a Full Professorship in 1979. He has been serving as a professor of Cellular and Molecular Pharmacology and adjunct professor of Psychiatry and Behavioral Sciences at The Chicago Medical School/Rosalind Franklin University.

Mosnaim holds an Honorary Full Professorship at the University of Chile College of Pharmaceutical Sciences.

== Research ==
Mosnaim has published over 150 papers in peer-reviewed Journals, more than 20 invited reviews and book chapters, and presented research in more than 200 scientific meetings.

Early in his research career (1967), Mosnaim contributed to elucidate the metabolic pathway of the then widely used toxic insecticide DDT (dichlorodiphenyltrichloroethane), and in a series of publications (1969–1972) helped to understand the mechanism of halogenation by cupric salts of carcinogenic anthracene and pyrene compounds. His laboratory demonstrated the presence of phenylethylamine, commonly viewed as the endogenous amphetamine, in mammalian tissues, and his work elucidated this amine’s in vivo and in vitro brain metabolic pathway. His work, animal models, contributed to establish phenylethylamine brain levels as a biological marker for various neuropsychiatric disorders, and to evaluate its brain changes in response to different classes of psychotropic drugs. Further research identified some of the physiological functions, and described relevant behavior and toxicological effects of phenylethylamine and various structurally related trace amines.

Mosnaim reported plasma levels of the endogenous opioid pentapeptide methionine-enkephalin in various patient populations, and the effect of selected classes of drugs on its degradation kinetics, suggesting that its significant increase in chronic cluster and migraine patients during an acute headache episode could serve as a biological marker for these illnesses. He also clarified reports of the activity of platelet monoamine oxidase and the role of dietary phenylethylamine and tyramine in the etiology of migraine headaches.

Mosnaim contributed to document the association of tardive dyskinesia and drug-induced parkinsonism, and in identifying sub-types, cognitive deficits, and some of the risk factors associated with increased vulnerability to this condition. He participated in studies finding comorbidity of pain, dermatological and allergic conditions, as well as decreased natural killer cell activity, in posttraumatic stress disorder patients. He reported the decrease of this immune function in septic shock and human immunodeficiency virus-1 positive individuals, as well as its significant increase by various substances with widely different chemical structures and biological activities, e.g., enkephalins, α-interferon, interleukin-2, taxol, and lipopolysaccharide.

== Bibliography ==
=== Selected edited books ===
- Noncatecholic phenylethylamines Part 1 (1978) ISBN 0-8247-6616-4
- Noncatecholic phenylethylamines Part 2 (1980) ISBN 0-8247-6721-7
- Tardive Dyskinesia: Biological Mechanisms & Clinical Aspects (1989) ISBN O-8804-8176-5
- Posttraumatic Stress Disorder: Etiology, Phenomenology, and Treatment (1990) ISBN 0-8804-8299-0

=== Selected articles ===
- Inwang, E. E.; Mosnaim, A. D.; Sabelli, H. C. (May 1973). "Isolation and characterization of phenylethylamine and phenylethanolamine from human brain". Journal of Neurochemistry. 20 (5): 1469–1473. doi:10.1111/j.1471-4159.1973.tb00259.x. PMID 4716838. S2CID 8349615.
- Sabelli, Hector C.; Mosnaim, A. David (June 1974). "Phenylethylamine Hypothesis of Affective Behavior". American Journal of Psychiatry. 131 (6): 695–699. doi:10.1176/ajp.131.6.695. PMID 4827802.
- Wolf, Marion E; Alavi, Afshin; Mosnaim, Aron D (March 1988). "Posttraumatic stress disorder in vietnam veterans clinical and EEG findings; possible therapeutic effects of carbamazepine". Biological Psychiatry. 23 (6): 642–644. doi:10.1016/0006-3223(88)90011-x. PMID 3355879. S2CID 40512787.
- Mosnaim, Aron D.; Ranade, Vasant V.; Wolf, Marion E.; Puente, Javier; Antonieta Valenzuela, M. (May 2006). "Phenothiazine Molecule Provides the Basic Chemical Structure for Various Classes of Pharmacotherapeutic Agents". American Journal of Therapeutics. 13 (3): 261–273. doi:10.1097/01.mjt.0000212897.20458.63. PMID 16772768.
