= Matilde Brandau =

Chilean lawyer

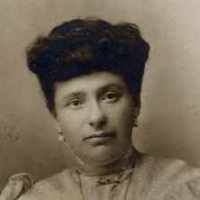
- Born: Matilde Brandau Galindo c. 1870; Los Ángeles, Chile
- Died: 1948
- Education: University of Chile
- Occupations: Lawyer, educator
- Spouse: José Luis Ross Mujica (1907–1908)
- Parents: Valentín Brandau Lapp (father); Emilia Galindo (mother)

Matilde Brandau Galindo (c. 1870 – 1948) was a Chilean lawyer and educator. She was the second woman to obtain the title of attorney in her country, after Matilde Throup.

== Biography ==
She was born in Los Ángeles, Chile, the daughter of Valentín Brandau Lapp and Emilia Galindo. Her only sibling was Valentín Brandau (1866–1960), also a lawyer.

With the enactment of the Decreto Amunátegui in 1877, women had the power to pursue university careers in Chile. Thanks to this, Brandau enrolled in the Faculty of Law (now the Faculty of Law and Political Science) at the University of Chile in 1893. She followed in the footsteps of Matilde Throup, who had become the first female attorney in Chile (and the third woman to obtain a university degree under the Decreto Amunátegui) one year earlier.

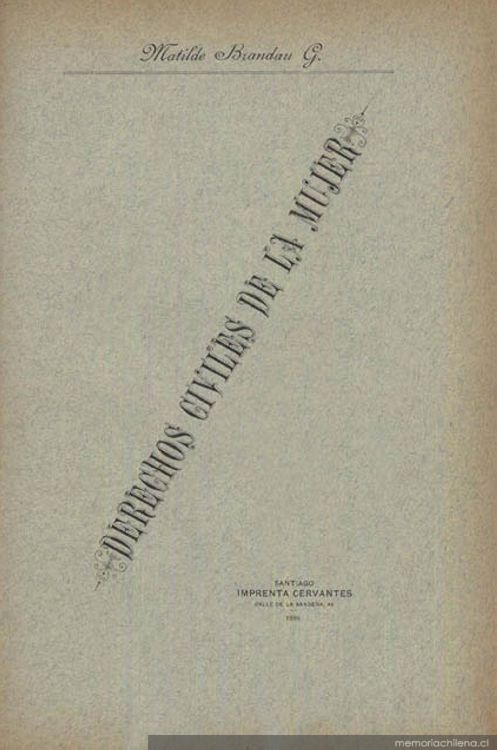
Cover page of Brandau's thesis Derechos civiles de la mujer (1898)

In 1898 Brandau presented her thesis Civil Rights of Women (Spanish: Derechos civiles de la mujer) to quality for a Licentiate of Laws. In this study, Brandau conducted an analysis of the legal status of women in different countries and eras, including Chile, and criticized the conditions of women under marriage contracts, as they were subject to marital power and left legally incapacitated. Several of her principles were progressively adopted in legislation as part of the Chilean Constitution of 1925, which modified the Chilean Civil Code and Law Decree No. 328.

Brandau never practiced law, and excelled in intellectual and educational pursuits. She was a member of the Athenaeum and an advocate for gender equality and the civil rights of women. She was also a promoter of women's education, serving as an educator and director of several secondary schools for girls, such as those of Linares (1905–1907), Constitución (1908–1913), and Iquique (1915). On two occasions she was sent by the government of Chile to Europe, in 1907 and 1927, to learn about women's education in Spain, Belgium, Switzerland, and Italy. During the first trip, her husband José Luis Ross Mujica (whom she had married in 1907, and who was serving as Chile's consul in Spain) died of appendicitis.

On her return to Chile, Brandau took over as director of the Lyceum No. 2 of Valparaíso. She managed the acquisition of the land for the institution's building, and its first stone was laid in 1937. The school is now named after her. She was also deeply involved in cultural activities, founding a literary center and developing the French Library, the People's University of Iquique, the Protective Society of Poor Students, the School Settlements, and the Iquique Children's Trust.
