= Rosa Devés =

Chilean university leader (born 1950)

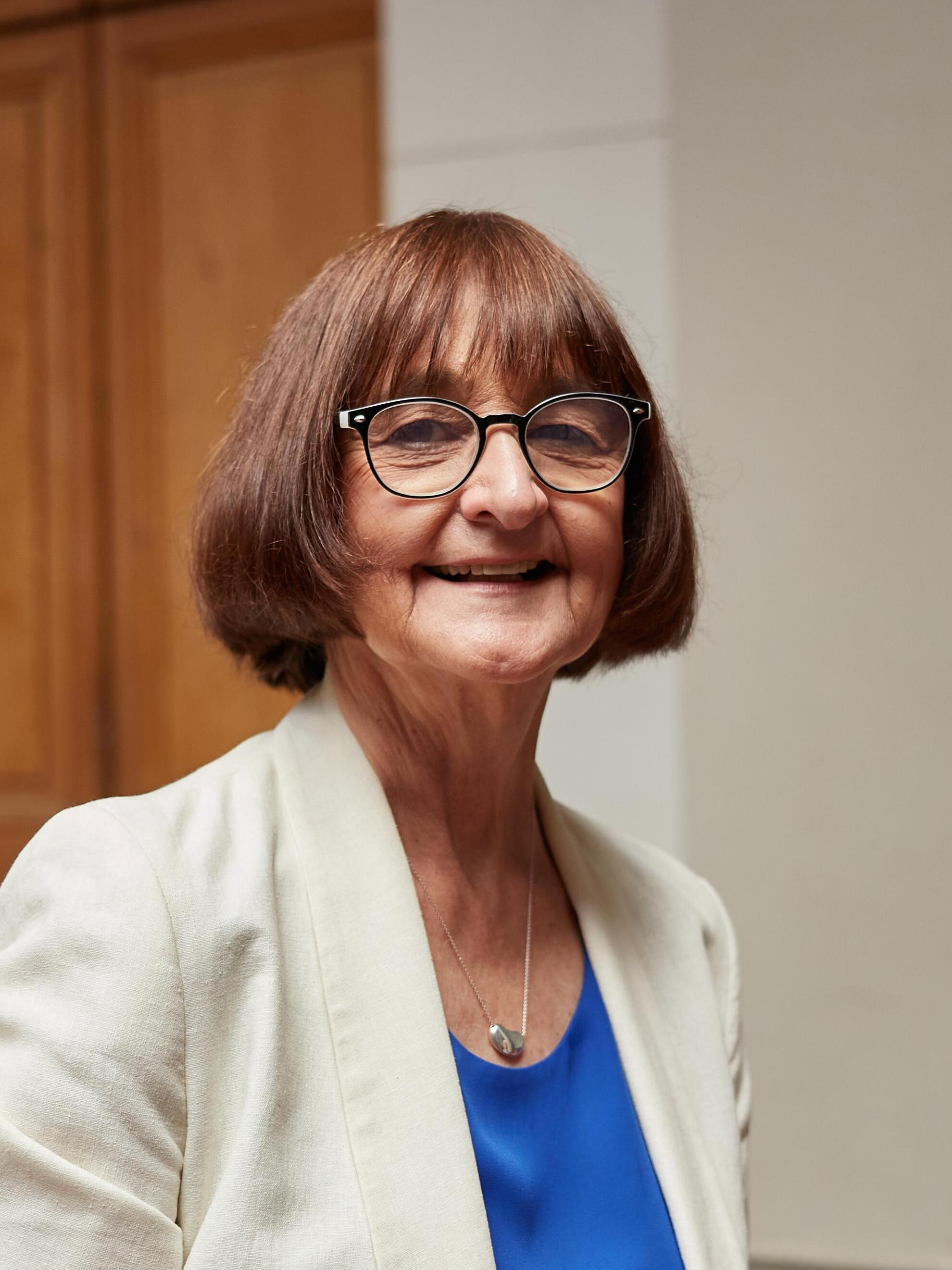
- Rosa Devés in 2022

Rector of the University of Chile
- In office 22 June 2022 – 19 June 2026
- Preceded by: Ennio Vivaldi
- Succeeded by: Alejandra Mizala

Personal details
- Born: 23 January 1950 (age 76) Santiago, Chile
- Education: University of Chile; University of Southern California; University of Western Ontario

Rosa Noemí Devés Alessandri (born 23 January 1950) is a Chilean biochemist and academic. In 2022, she was elected as the first female rector of the University of Chile.

== Early life and education ==
Devés was born on 23 January 1950 in Santiago , Chile. She is member of the prominent Alessandri family as the grand-niece of Jorge Alessandri and great-granddaughter of Arturo Alessandri, both former Presidents of Chile.

As a child, she practised ballet and theatre.

In 1968, Devés enrolled at the University of Chile, graduating in 1974. As a student, she had sympathised with the government of President Salvador Allende. In 1978, she obtained a PhD in biochemistry from the University of Western Ontario, Canada, and subsequently completed postdoctoral studies at the University of Southern California, United States.

== Career ==
Back in Chile, in 1980 Devés joined the Department of Physiology and Biophysics at the Faculty of Medicine of the University of Chile, where she taught and conducted research on cellular physiology and became a full professor in 1998. In the 1980s, she was a member of the Andrés Bello University and Cultural Association, a forum for reflection and defence of the university under the dictatorship, and served as its president between 1986 and 1987.

During the 1988 Chilean presidential referendum, she joined the Party for Democracy, although she remained independent.

Her research in the field of cellular physiology, specifically on transport mechanisms in biological membranes, was recognised internationally, and in 2002 she was appointed a corresponding member of the Chilean Academy of Sciences.

=== Academic career ===
Between 1990 and 1995, and between 2002 and 2006, she directed the Doctorate Programme in Biomedical Sciences, and between 1997 and 2000, Devés was deputy director of the Institute of Biomedical Sciences at the Faculty of Medicine. At the Institute, she promoted the Science Education for Basic Education programme to train citizens in science.

Subsequently, between 2006 and 2010, she was Director of Postgraduate and Post-Doctoral Studies, and between 2010 and 2014, she was the first female Vice-Chancellor of the University of Chile. In 2011, Devés created a special access route called the "Priority Admission System for Educational Equity", which facilitated student admission to the University. Between 2014 and 2022, she was Vice-Rector for Academic Affairs.

She supported the 2018 Chilean feminist protests and strikes and the 2022 Chilean constitutional referendum.

Devés was elected the first female rector of the University of Chile on 12 May 2022 with 51.68% of the votes. She was sworn in on 22 June 2022 at a ceremony attended by Chilean President Gabriel Boric. In her inaugural speech, Devés called for efforts to strengthen public education and represent women's struggle to occupy spaces for academic development.
