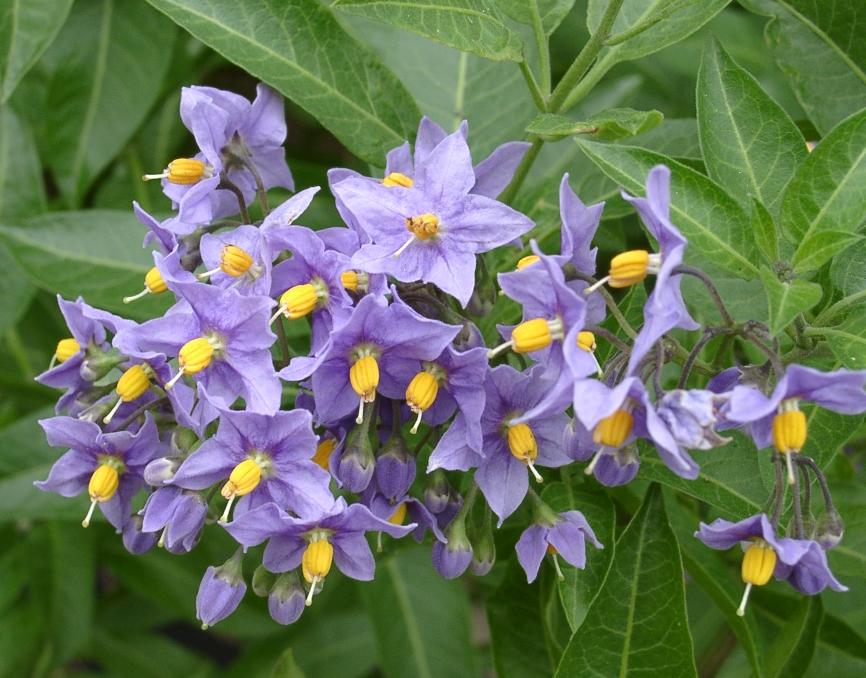

Scientific classification
- Kingdom: Plantae
- Clade: Embryophytes
- Clade: Tracheophytes
- Clade: Angiosperms
- Clade: Eudicots
- Clade: Asterids
- Order: Solanales
- Family: Solanaceae
- Genus: Solanum
- Species: S. crispum

Binomial name
- Solanum crispum Ruiz & Pav.

Synonyms
- List: Witheringia crispa (Ruiz & Pav.) J.Rémy; Solanum angustifolium var. brevifolium Dunal; Solanum berteroanum (J.Rémy) Phil.; Solanum concavum Lindl.; Solanum congestiflorum Dunal; Solanum congestiflorum var. longifolium Dunal; Solanum congestiflorum var. pannosum (Phil.) Reiche; Solanum congestiflorum var. syringifolium (Kunth & C.D.Bouché) Reiche; Solanum crispum var. eleagnifolium Dunal; Solanum crispum var. ligustrinum (G.Lodd.) Dunal; Solanum floribundum Dunal; Solanum gayanum (J.Rémy) F.Phil.; Solanum izquierdoi Phil.; Solanum laetum Kunze; Solanum landbeckii Phil.; Solanum ligustrinum G.Lodd.; Solanum pannosum Phil.; Solanum pugae Phil.; Solanum pyrrhocarpum Phil.; Solanum sadae Phil.; Solanum syringifolium Kunth & C.D.Bouché; Solanum tagua Kuntze; Solanum tomatillo (Remy) F.Phil.; Witheringia berteroana J.Rémy; Witheringia gayana J.Rémy; Witheringia tomatillo J.Rémy

= Solanum crispum =

Species of plant

Solanum crispum is a species of flowering plant in the family Solanaceae. It is native to Chile and Peru. Common names include Chilean potato vine, Chilean nightshade, Chilean potato tree and potato vine. Growing to 6 m (20 ft) tall, it is a semi-evergreen, woody-stemmed climbing plant. The small blue fragrant flowers, 2.5 cm in diameter, with prominent yellow ovaries, appear in clusters in summer. They resemble those of the closely related potato. Very small poisonous berries are produced in autumn. The berries start out green, then yellow-orange, and finally purple. The leaves are oval.

The specific epithet crispum means "closely curled".

== Cultivation ==
Solanum crispum is grown as a garden plant. The free-flowering cultivar 'Glasnevin' has gained the Royal Horticultural Society's Award of Garden Merit.

The plant is fast-growing with a long flowering period, typically from midsummer till autumn (fall). It grows well in neutral or slightly alkaline soils that are moist and well drained. Requiring some protection from frost, planting it against a south- or west-facing fence or wall in full sun is recommended.

There is a white form known as 'Album'.
