= Matilde Throup =

Chilean attorney

- Born: Matilde Throup Sepúlveda; 18 August 1876; Angol, Chile
- Died: 1922 (aged 46)
- Education: University of Chile
- Occupation: Attorney

Matilde Throup Sepúlveda (18 August 1876 – 1922) was the first Chilean woman to receive the title of attorney, and the third to obtain a professional title after the institution of the Decreto Amunátegui of 1877 which allowed women to be admitted to universities.

== Biography ==
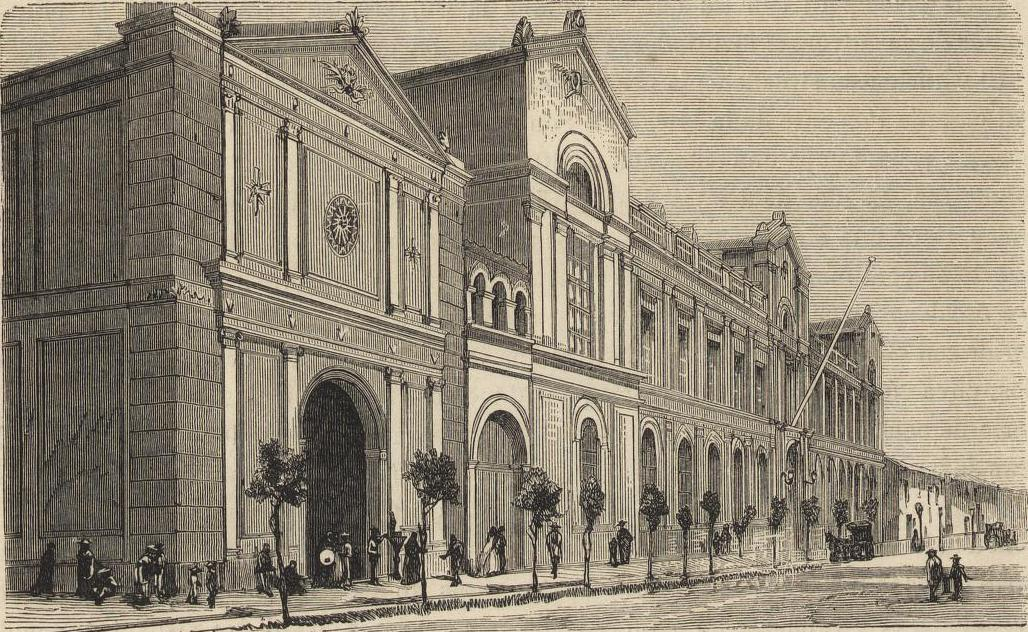
Casa Central of the University of Chile in 1872, seat of the Faculty of Law where Throup was a student

Matilde Throup Sepúlveda was born in Angol in 1876, the daughter of a former Chilean Army soldier. On 28 March 1887 she obtained a Bachelor of Philosophy and Humanities degree. She subsequently applied to study at the University of Chile's Faculty of Law, where she received a Bachelor of Law and Political Science on 25 May 1891.

On 6 June 1892 she obtained a Licentiate of Laws, becoming the first Chilean woman to receive a university degree, which enabled her to receive the title of attorney granted by the Supreme Court. The second woman to become an attorney was Matilde Brandau, in 1898. Throup's degree was used as a precedent by Belgium and Argentina when granting the title of attorney to women.

After becoming a lawyer, Throup ran for the office of court clerk of the Courts of Letters, notary, and Conservator of Real Estate for Ancud. The Court of Appeals of Concepción, which oversaw this civil service entrance examination, requested a ruling from the Fiscalía Judicial in respect to her eligibility. It opined that a woman could not serve in the post, and this view was endorsed by the Court of Appeals in an order published 6 April 1893. Throup appealed to the Supreme Court, which overturned the initial decision on 23 September 1893, setting a precedent regarding the right of women to hold public offices requiring the title of attorney, with the same conditions as for men.

Throup later competed for the posts of officer of the Civil Registry and Identification Service for Santiago, and notary public of Santiago. She was accepted for both exams, and in the latter case was included in the short list from which the position was chosen by the government.

Matilde Throup died in 1922 at age 46.

== See also ==
- First women lawyers around the world
